= Mizoram =

- State
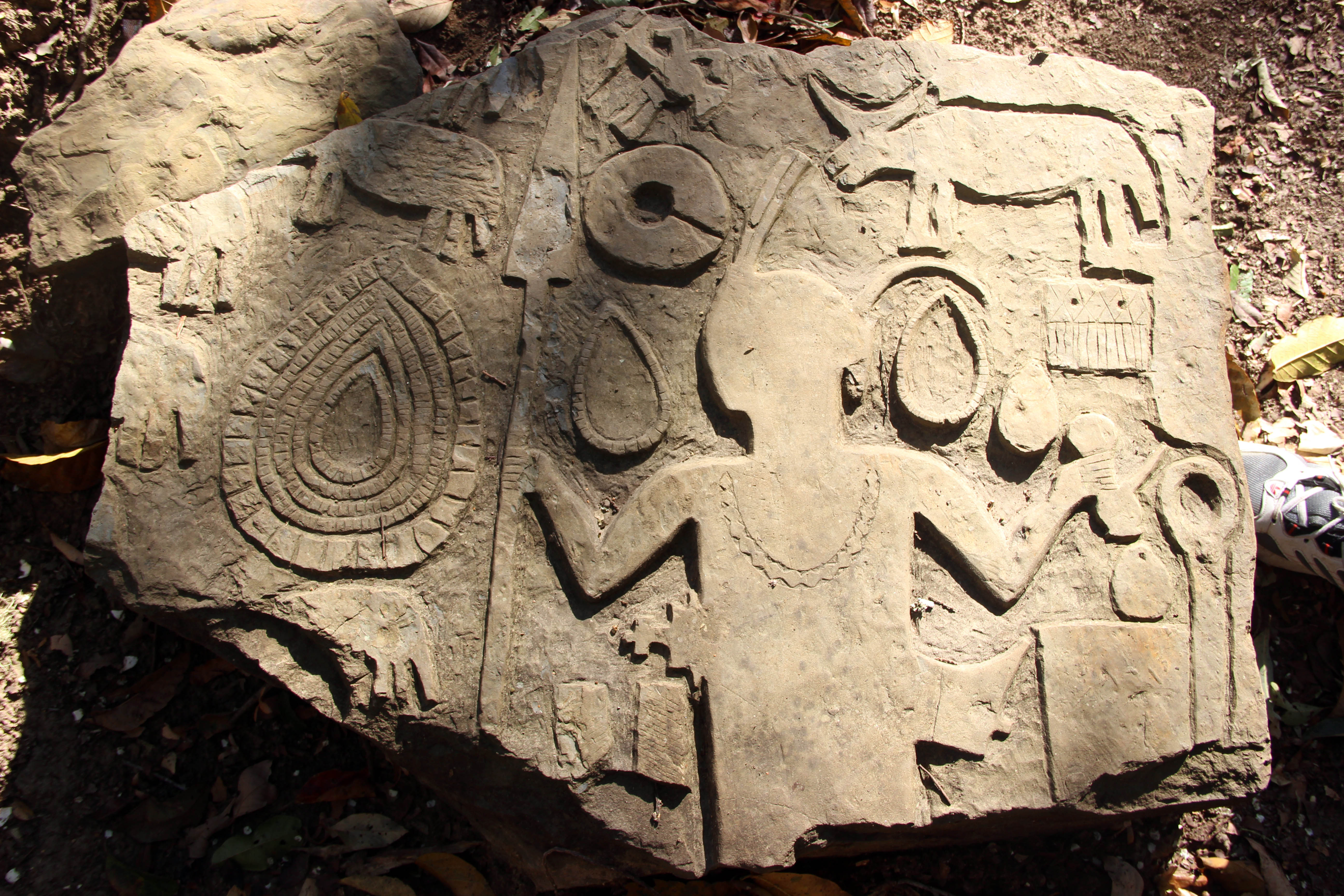
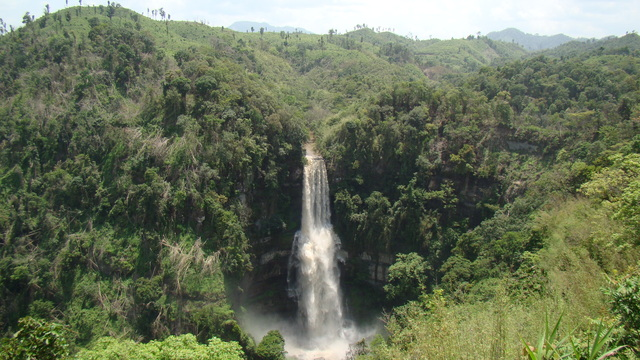
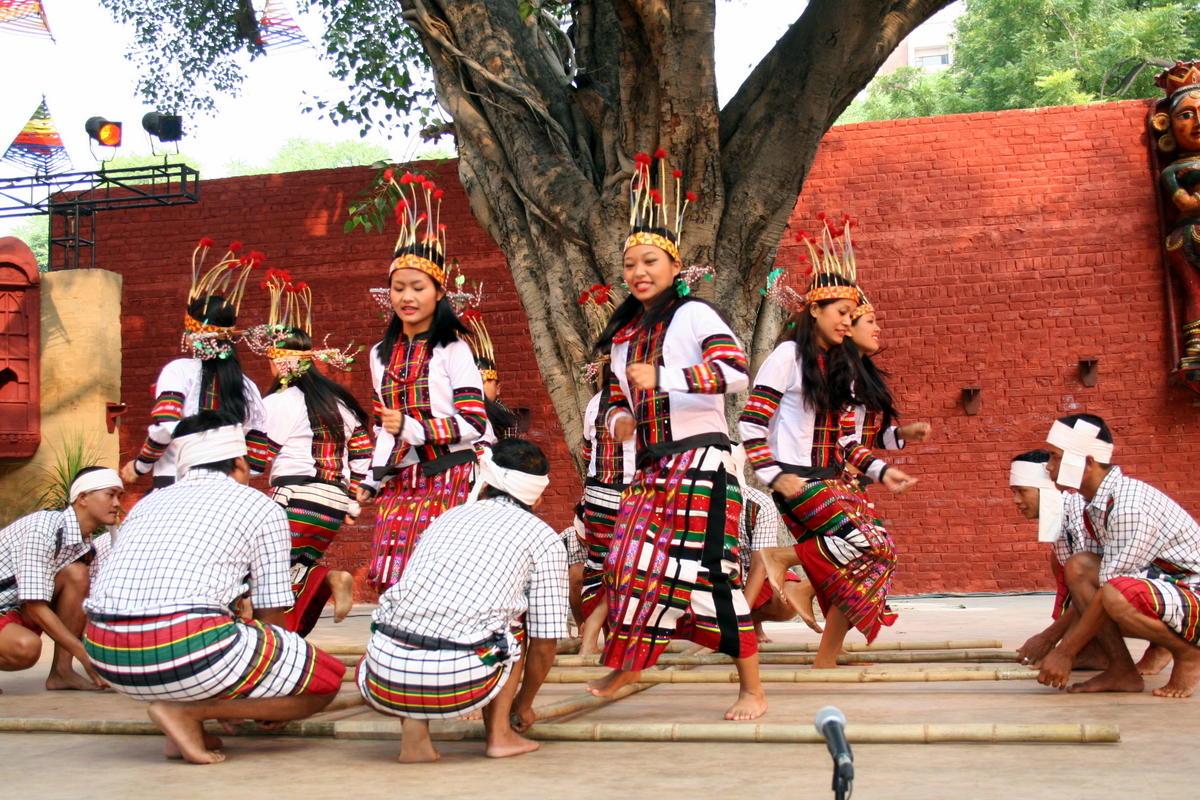
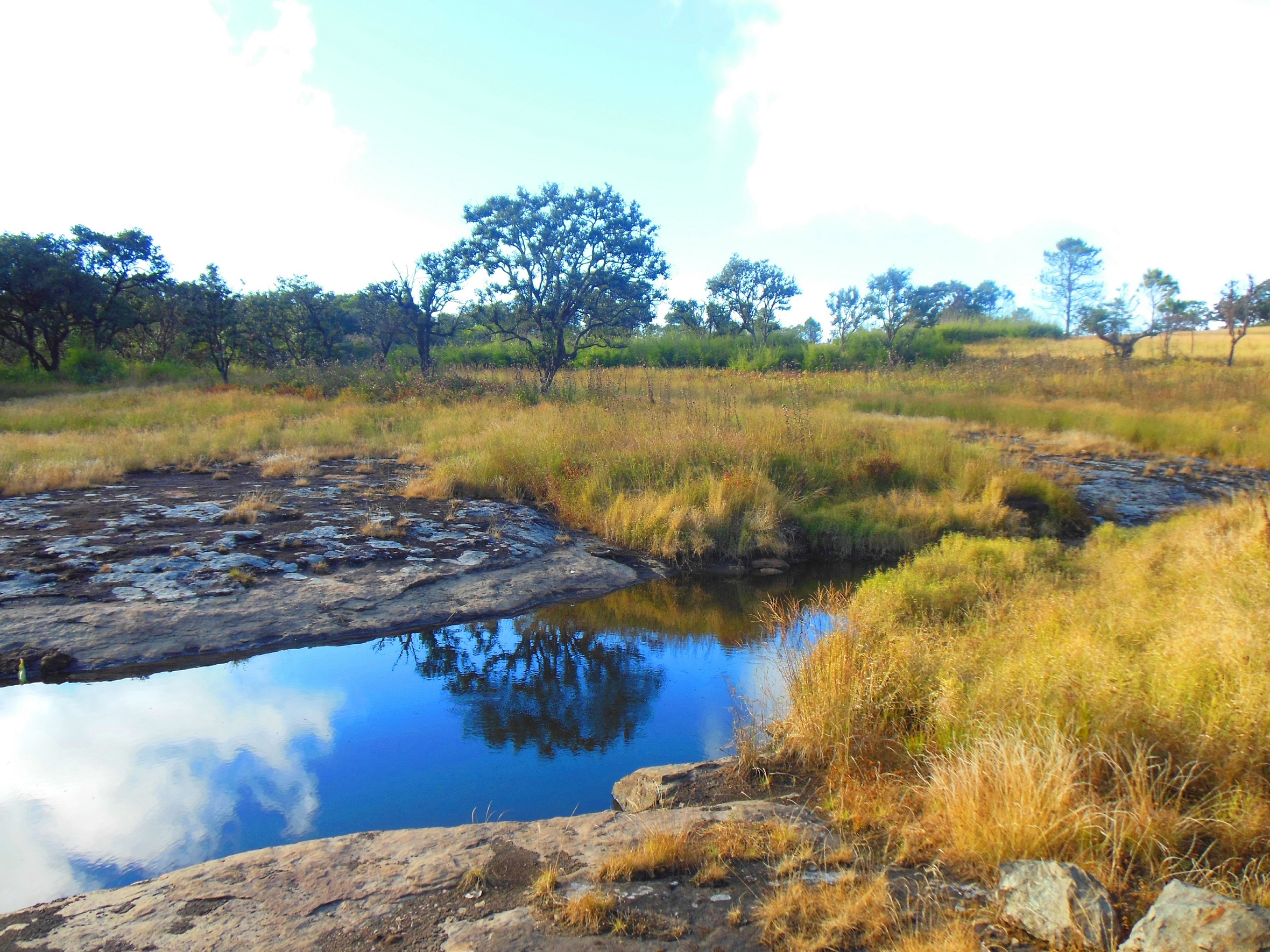
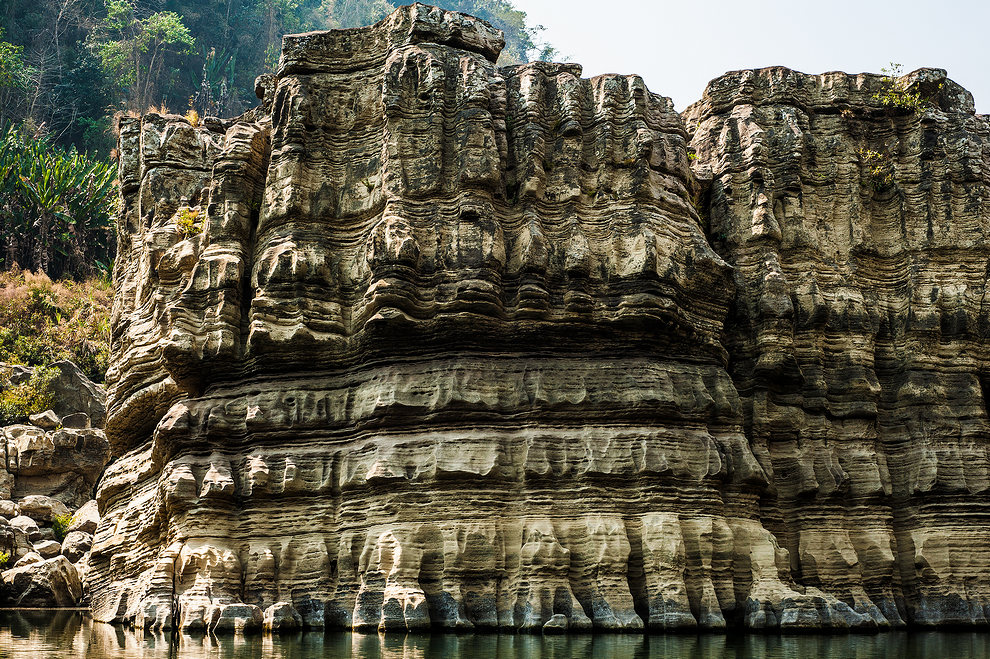
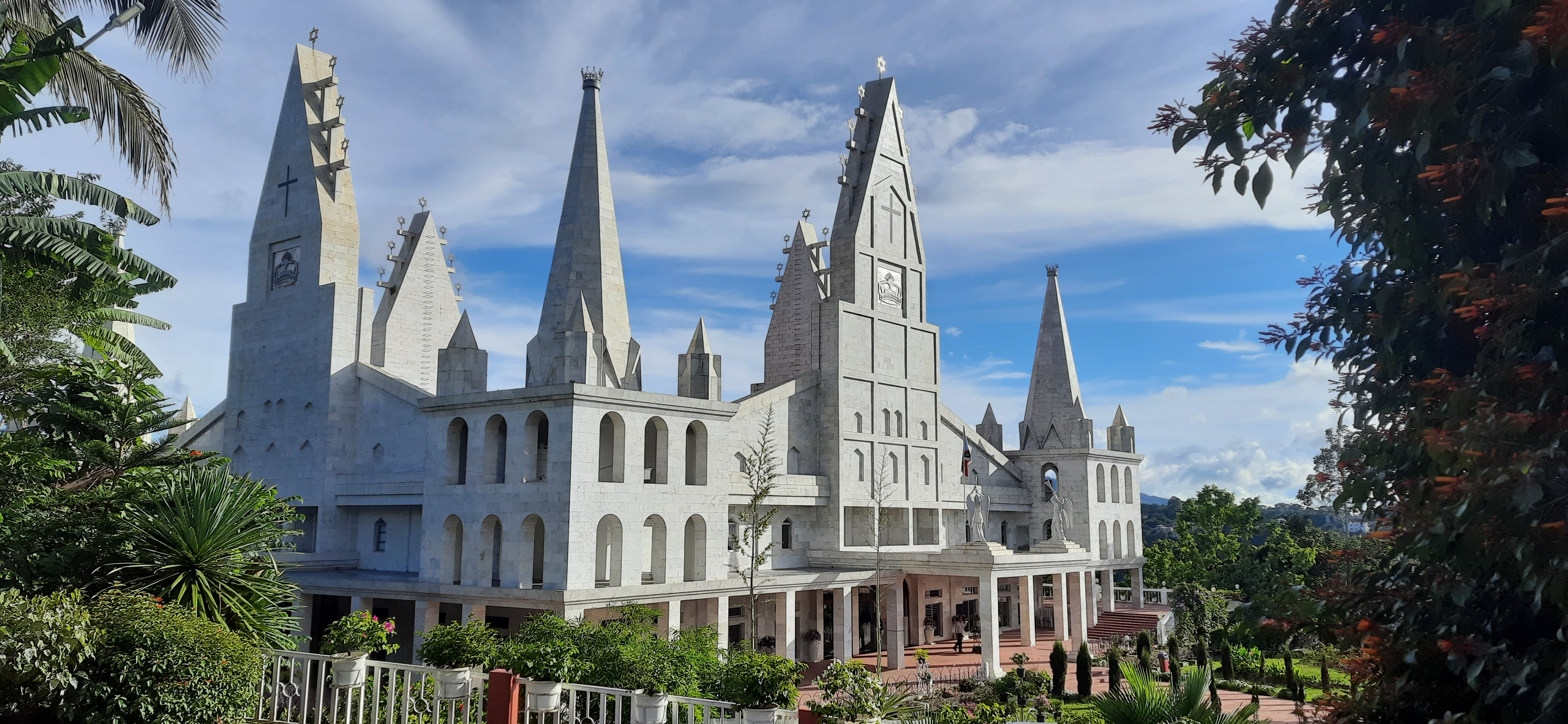
- Kawtchhuah Ropui Vantawng Falls Cheraw dance Phawngpui National Park Castle of Bawinu Solomon's Temple

- Emblem of Mizoram
- Motto(s): Satyameva Jayate (Sanskrit) "Truth alone triumphs"
- Anthem: Ro Min Rêlsak Ang Che "Be Thou Our Counsellor"
- Location of Mizoram in India
- Coordinates: 23.36°N 92.8°E
- Country: India
- Region: Northeast India
- Previously was: Union Territory
- Formation: 20 February 1987
- Capital and largest city: Aizawl
- Districts: 11

Government
  - Body: Government of Mizoram
  - Governor: V. K. Singh
  - Chief Minister: Lalduhoma (ZPM)

Area
  - Total: 21,081 km^{2} (8,139 sq mi)
  - Rank: 24th
- Highest elevation (Phawngpui): 2,157 m (7,077 ft)

Population (2025)
  - Total: ▲1,264,000
  - Rank: 27th
  - Density: 59.96/km^{2} (155.3/sq mi)
  - Urban: 55.52%
  - Rural: 44.48%

Language
  - Official: Mizo; English
  - Official script: Latin script

GDP
  - Total (2026–27): ▲₹43,817 crore (US$4.7 billion) (nominal)
  - Rank: 32nd
  - Per capita: ▲₹287,097 (US$3,100) (nominal) (2024–25 FY) (17th)
- Time zone: UTC+05:30 (IST)
- ISO 3166 code: IN-MZ
- Vehicle registration: MZ
- HDI (2022): ▲0.709 High (10th)
- Literacy (2024): 98.2% (1st)
- Sex ratio (2025): 976♀/1000 ♂
- Website: mizoram.gov.in
- Symbols of Mizoram
- Bird: Mrs. Hume's pheasant
- Flower: Renanthera imschootiana
- Mammal: Saza
- Tree: Herhse
- State highway mark
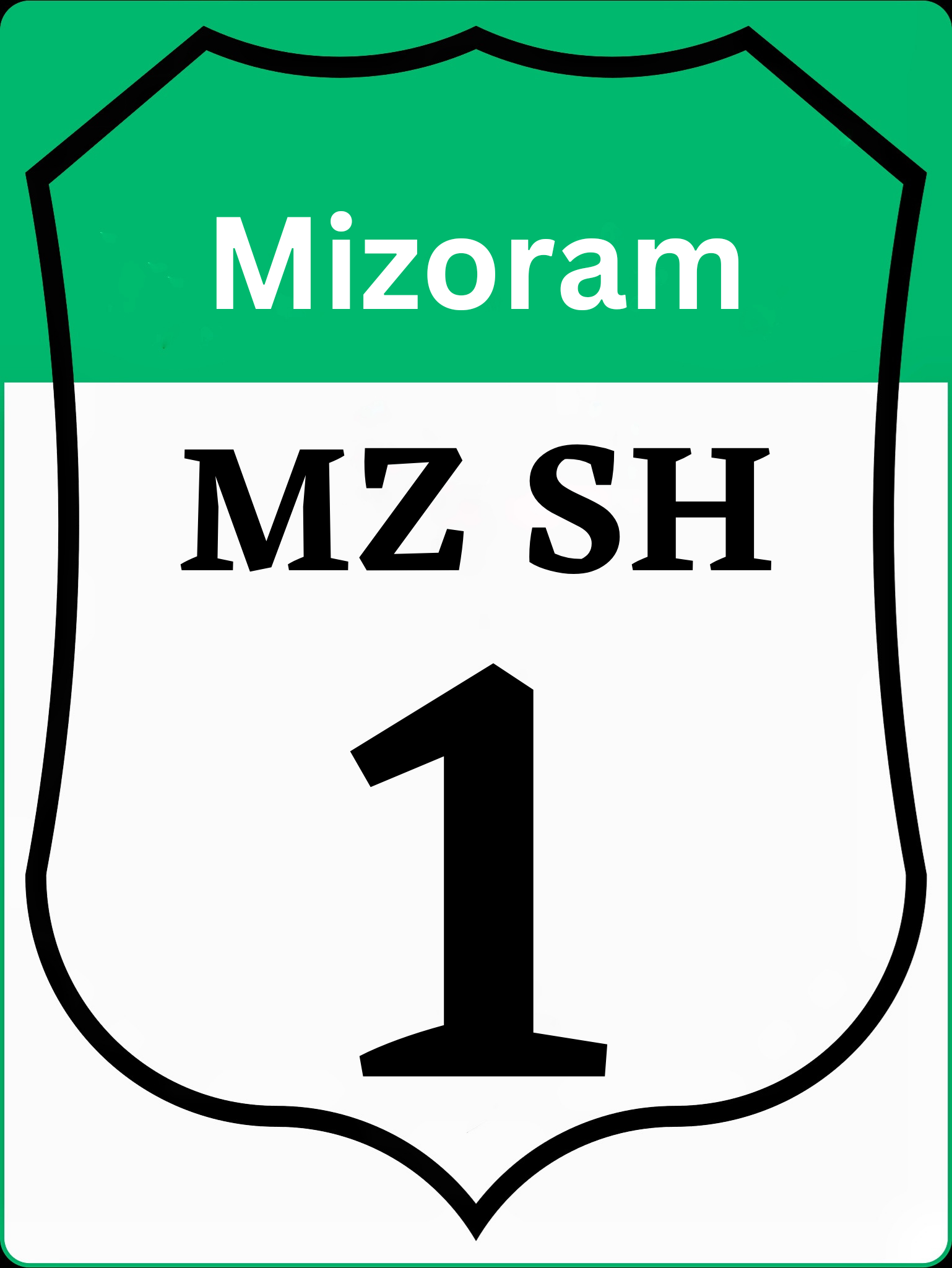
- State highway of Mizoram; SH 1- SH 11
- List of Indian state symbols

Mizoram (Note: /mɪˈzɔːrəm/ mih-ZOR-um; Lushai: mịzórám, pronounced [mɪ.zoː.ɾaːm]) is a state in northeastern India. It shares international borders with Bangladesh to the west and Myanmar to the east and south. The state is bordered by the Indian states of Assam and Manipur to the north, with Tripura to the west. Aizawl serves as its capital and largest city. Mizoram covers 21,081 square kilometres (8,139 sq mi), of which 84.53% is forested, making it the 4th-most forested state in India. With an estimated 1.26 million inhabitants, it is the 2nd-least populated state. Its urbanisation rate of 51.5% makes the state the most urbanised in northeast India, ranking 5th nationwide. Mizo, written in the Latin-based Mizo hawrâwp, is the most widely spoken and the official language of the state, alongside English. Mizoram is home to the highest percentage of scheduled tribes in India, with the Mizos forming the majority.

Archaeological discoveries at Vangchhia suggest human settlement in present-day Mizoram as early as the 6th century BCE. At Kolalian, researchers tentatively dated stone sculptures indicating Hindu and Buddhist influences to the 7th–9th centuries CE. During the 14th century, Tibeto-Burman-speaking peoples gradually migrated from the Chin Hills in present-day Myanmar. These groups formed autonomous chiefdoms. By the 18th century, the Sailo dynasty dominated much of the region, promoting the Lusei dialect, the basis of modern Mizo. In the mid-19th century, the British conducted a series of military expeditions, leading to annexation in 1895 as the Lushai Hills District of Assam Province. Under British rule, the spread of Christianity significantly impacted Mizo society, gradually replacing Sakhua practices. After Indian independence, the district remained within Assam. Discontent over Assam's handling of the mauṭam famine fuelled an uprising in 1966. Mizoram became a union territory in 1972. The 1986 Mizoram Peace Accord, widely regarded as one of India’s most successful peace settlements, paved the way for statehood on 20 February 1987, joining the union as its 23rd state.

Mizoram is predominantly Christian, with about 87% of the population practising Christianity, mainly Protestant denominations such as Presbyterian and Baptist. It is one of the three states of India with a Christian majority. Other religions such as Buddhism (8.51%), Hinduism (2.75%), and Islam (1.35%) are also practised in the state. Mizoram's population is predominantly made up of Mizo or Zo tribes, comprising about 83.4% of the state's population, with other significant communities including the Chakma (8.5%) and Tripuri (3%). Due to the prolonged civil conflict in Myanmar, Mizoram has also seen an influx of Burmese communities, especially from the Chin ethnic group, which has sought refuge in the region.

Mizoram is a highly literate agrarian economy. Slash-and-burn farming, also known as jhum, is the most common form of farming in the state. In recent years, the jhum farming practices have been steadily replaced with a significant horticulture and bamboo products industry. Mizoram's estimated gross state domestic product for 2025 was estimated at ₹36,089 crore (US$3.9 billion). About 20% of Mizoram's population lives below the poverty line, with 35% rural poverty as of 2014. The state has about 871 kilometres of national highways, with NH 54 and NH 150 connecting it to Assam and Manipur respectively. It is also a growing transit point for trade with Myanmar and Bangladesh.

== Etymology and names ==
The name Mizoram is derived from two Mizo words: Mizo and ram. Mizo refers to the native inhabitants of the region, with Mi meaning "human" or "civilian" and zo holding varied interpretations. Some suggest Zo signifies "highland" or "remote," drawing parallels to Willem van Schendel's concept of Zomia Others associate it with the feeling of "cool" or "crisp," evoking the climate of the high-altitude region. The second component, ram, means "land" or "forest". Together, Mizoram translates to "land of the Mizos" or simply "Mizo land."

Before gaining statehood in 1987, the region was historically known as the Lushai Hills District from British colonial rule and for the first 40 years of Indian independence. Lushai is an anglicised form of Lusei, one of the prominent clans among the Mizo people whose dialect formed the basis of modern Mizo. Then, the new state government of Mizoram replaced the old name with Mizoram to reflect the broader identity of the Mizo community.

The widespread adoption of Mizo gained momentum by the 1961 census, with over 96% of the population identifying under the term. This surge in popularity is attributed to political developments, particularly the efforts of the Mizo Union. Founded to unify various tribes of the Lushai Hills, the Mizo Union played a pivotal role in redefining regional identity. In 1954, the organisation successfully advocated for renaming the Lushai Hills District as the Mizo District, further solidifying the term Mizo as a collective identity.

== History ==
=== Prehistory (600 BCE) ===
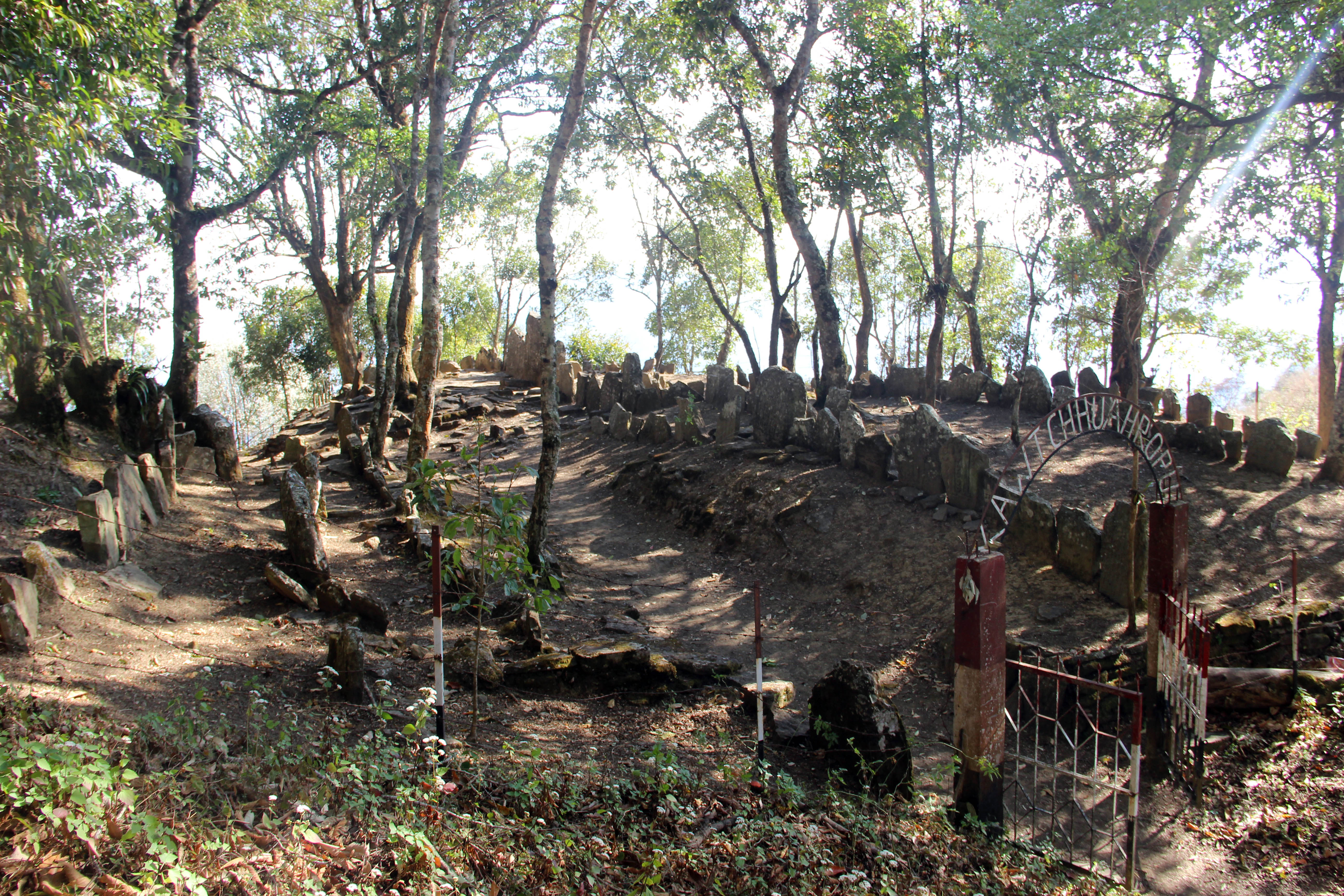
Vangchhia necropolis site

The prehistory and early history of Mizoram are marked by the presence of ancient human settlements, with evidence suggesting that people inhabited the region as early as 2,000 to 3,000 years ago. The archaeological evidence from the Vangchhia site has provided insights into the region's ancient past, with human remains, ornaments, pottery, and burial practices dating back to 600 BCE and extending up to 1750 CE. Excavations at Vangchhia revealed a sophisticated culture with distinct socio-political structures of the Indo–Lushai cultural genus. This necropolis is considered one of the largest in the world.

A unique discovery at Vangchhia is the Pipute Lamlian (transl. grandparents' big path), also known as the "Ancestors' Pathway," a footpath that traverses the site and branches out in three directions—north, south, and east. The path is lined with rocks engraved with images of sial heads, flowers, and human figures, reminiscent of carvings found at Kawtchhuah Ropui. This suggests that the region was separate from other civilisations, with trade connections extending across the region, including Bangladesh, Mainland India, and Myanmar.

Among the most significant findings is a 200-metre long water pavilion, resembling those found in Mughal cities. The discovery of such a feature points to the possibility of a much larger, lost civilisation.

=== Arrival of the Mizos (1500s) ===
The Mizos, part of the Tibeto-Burman linguistic group, are believed to have embarked on a southward journey between the 16th and 18th centuries, originating from areas in present-day China and Myanmar.

The Chhînlung origin legend, cherished in Mizo folklore, speaks of an ancestral homeland, often associated with a location near the Yalong River in China. Linguistic and anthropological evidence suggests that the Mizos passed migrated from the Chindwin and Irrawaddy River regions before the 8th century AD through the Shan States of Myanmar, the Kabaw Valley, settled in the Chin Hills, then the Lusei tribe first crossed the Ṭiau river to settle in the Lushai Hills by the 1500s. Following the Luseis, the Hmâr, Thado, Pawi, Suktê, Mara, and other subgroups occupied different regions of Mizoram by the 1700s.

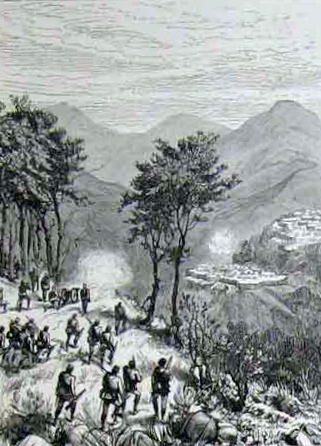
One of the many battles between British troops and British-aligned tribes of Mizoram against a Lusei clan in Mizoram. This sketch is by Lieutenant Cole in 1889 titled "Looshai expedition".

=== Chieftainship (1500s–1954) ===
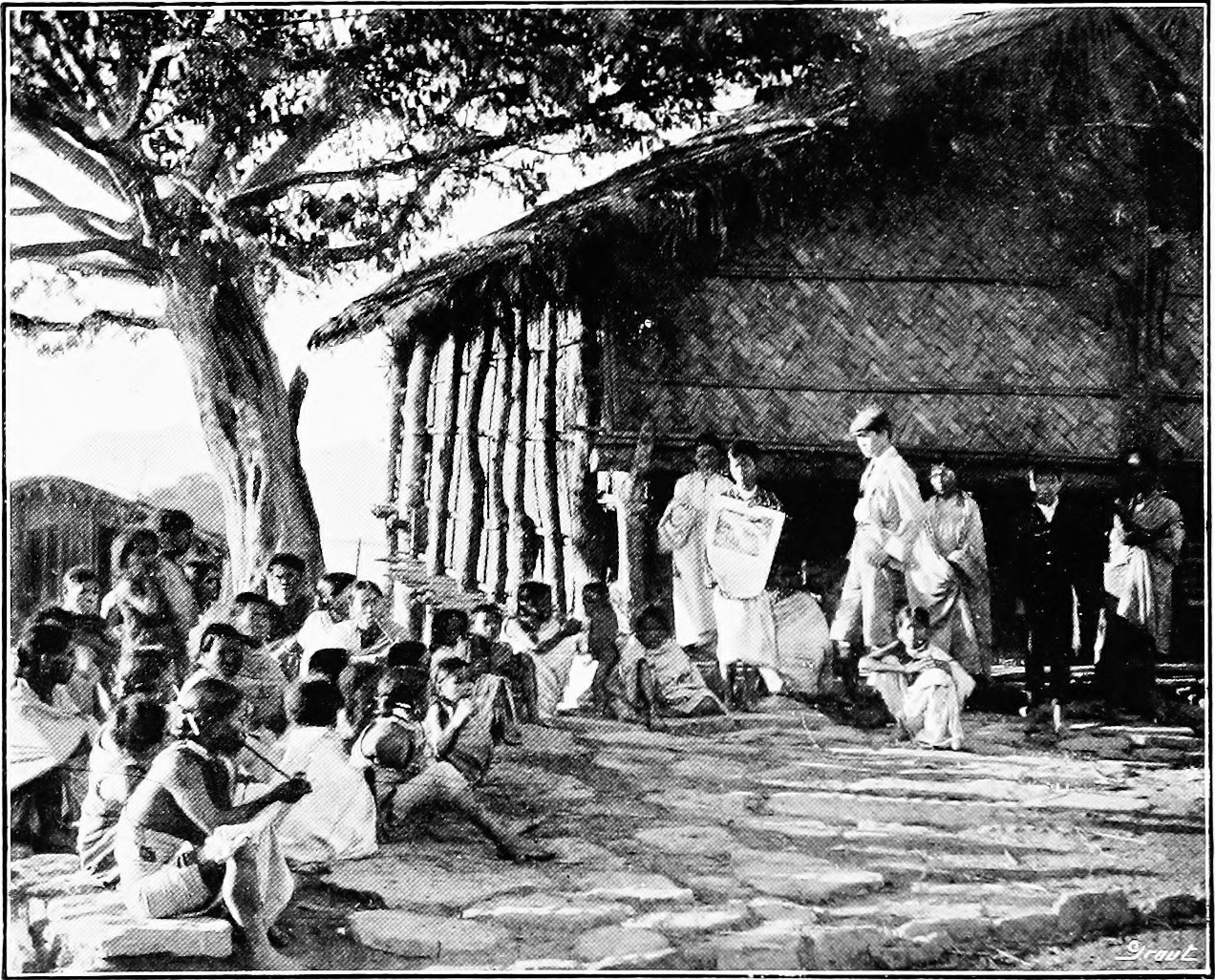
Zawlbuk, a Mizo traditional bachelor's dormitory

Historically, Mizo chiefdoms were primarily subsistence-based, practising slash-and-burn, locally called jhum cultivation, but they also engaged in trade due to their proximity to ancient trade routes linking Yunnan to the Bay of Bengal. Chiefs often demanded tributes from neighbouring kingdoms in the plains and established a barter system within their chiefdoms. Larger transactions relied on the sial (tame bison) as a unit of wealth and compensation, while elephant tusks served as an alternative currency. Mizo chiefs also employed karbari or "men of business", who acted as intermediaries between the chiefs and foreign traders. Skilled in jungle navigation and multiple languages, such as Bengali, the karbari facilitated trade, particularly in South Lushai Hills.

The forests of Mizoram provided valuable resources such as elephant hides and bones, which were highly sought after by merchants from Sylhet during the Mughal Empire. Elephant hides were used for shields in local infantry and cavalry, while the bones were crafted into luxury items and sword parts. Chiefs maintained a rudimentary system for measuring and sorting goods like rice, using specially shaped buckets. The first Mizo chief was Zahmuaka in the 16th century.

The zawlbûk system was established during the chieftainship era as a cornerstone of Mizo society, blending governance, defence, and cultural education. Originating as a bachelor dormitory for young men, it was situated at the village entrance to serve as both a sentinel hub and a training ground. Chiefs and elders implemented the Zawlbûk to prepare the youth for communal responsibilities, teaching them skills in warfare, agriculture, and social customs. This system fostered unity, discipline, and loyalty, ensuring that the village thrived under the collective effort and vigilance of its people.

==== Domination of the Sailo dynasty (1700s) ====
Lallula of the Sailo dynasty inherited the Confederation of Selesih. Since his rule, the tribes have used the Lusei dialect as a common language and is the lingua franca of all Mizoram ethnicities till today.

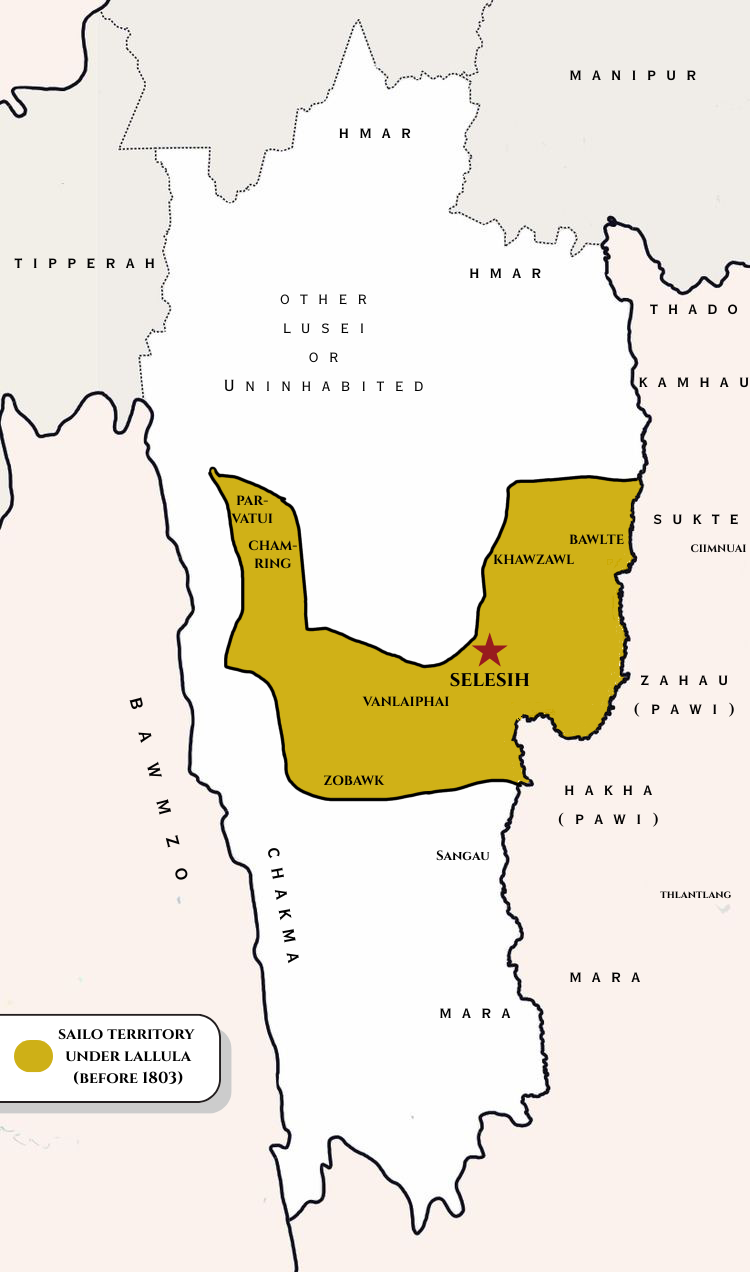
Territory of the Sailo dynasty under the rule of Lallula before his death in 1803.

The migration of the Lusei tribe from the neighbouring region, prompted by conflicts with the Chins (or "Pawi" in Mizo), led to the establishment of Selesih. Around 1720, the tribe, under the leadership of Chief Sailova's sons, Chungnunga and Lianlula, created a refuge in Selesih, forming a confederation of seven chiefs to defend their land. This confederation brought together a diverse range of tribes from the region. The settlement, with a population estimated to be between 50,000 and 100,000, housed approximately 7,000 homes, making it one of the most prosperous and populous settlements in ancient Mizoram.

The Selesih Confederation began to decline in the late 18th century, mainly due to socio-political and environmental factors. One of the primary reasons for its fall was the unsustainable agricultural practices, particularly shifting cultivation (jhum), which required regular migration to maintain fertile land. It is now located between South Khawbung and Zawlsei villages in Champhai district.

==== Lal Sawi ====
Lal Sawi (lit. 'Punishing of the chief') was an unsuccessful uprising against chieftainship in precolonial Mizoram. After the Chhak Leh Thlang Indo (East–West War) in the late 1880s, villagers forced Chief Lalkhûma and his councillors to extinguish a piece of burning wood in water, symbolically ending his rule. The revolt spread across the Lushai Hills, with some villages abolishing chieftainship and others securing reforms.

Disputes over who should lead the villages weakened the movement. The suppression of the revolt at Hmawngkawn encouraged other villages to reinstate their chiefs. The chiefs sought to punish the ringleaders, but the British Chin–Lushai Expedition intervened.

=== British Lushai Hills (1898–1947) ===
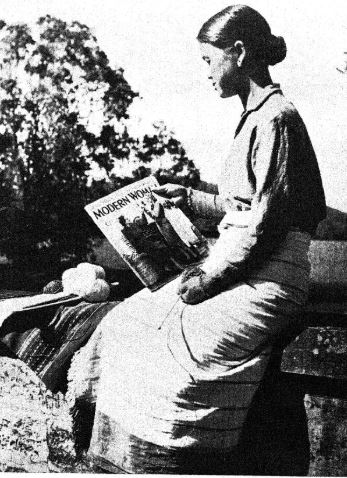
A Lushai woman reading an English magazine

Following the conclusion of the First Anglo-Burmese War, the British solidified their presence in Assam and Bengal, bringing them closer to the Lushai Hills. The first Anglo–Lushai skirmishes occurred after the Lushai Expedition in 1870–71, prompted by the Lushai kidnapping of a British tea owner's daughter, Mary Winchester, during a major raid in Alexandrapur.

Following the Chin-Lushai Expedition, the southern region of the Lushai Hills was occupied first in 1889 and was part of the Bengal Presidency. Its capitals were Fort Treagor (1889–1892) and Lung Leh (1892–1898). Then, North Lushai Hills was occupied in 1891 and was part of the Assam Province. In 1898, both regions merged into the Lushai Hills of Assam Province, with Aijal as the capital. At the time of the British conquest, there were around 60 chiefs.

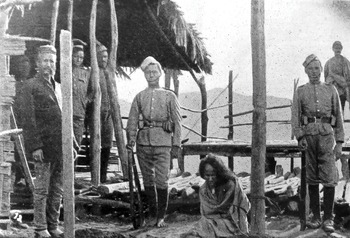
Zakapa on the day he was captured by John Shakespear.

The annexation of the Lushai Hills sparked resistance from the chiefs across separate periods between 1890 and 1895. A western Lushai Rising was led by Kalkhama in 1890. An Eastern Lushai Rising was led by Lalburha in 1892. The southern chiefs such as Ropuiliani and Zakapa were also subdued.

The Zahau chief Nikuala was captured and imprisoned by the British. Other chiefs opted for cooperation such as chieftainess Darbilhi who helped set up Fort Tregear. Soon after the Lushai Rising, Dâra became the first non-noble person to be made a chief by the British. He was given control of Pukpui as a reward for his service in the Lushai Rising by Captain Shakespear's side.

==== World War I ====
During World War I, few Lushais initially enlisted, but social pressures and benefits like tax exemptions and travel opportunities boosted recruitment. By April 1917, 2100 Lushai men joined the 27th Indian Labour Corps, serving in France, Mesopotamia, and other regions. They faced challenges such as disease and casualties, with 71 deaths recorded. Exposure to foreign cultures influenced modernisation, introducing European styles and French culinary elements. Returning veterans joined Indian military units, and a memorial was built in Aijal to honour those who served.

==== First political movements ====
Organised political movements in the Lushai Hills began in 1925 under Telela Raltê, seeking representation in the Assam administration. Supported by Chawngbawia, a schoolteacher, and Khasi leader J.J.M. Nichols Roy, the group advocated for administrative change but faced suppression, with arrests by the Superintendent Nevill Edward Parry halting progress until after World War II. Concurrently, the Inner Line Regulation was amended to restrict external influence, preserving cultural and land integrity while ensuring British dominion boundaries.

Later, the rise of education and inspiration from the Young Men's Buddhist Association in Burma led to the formation of the Young Lushai Association (YLA) in 1935, a cultural organisation initially composed of chiefs' sons but eventually dominated by commoners. The YLA opposed Lushai chieftainship, shaping the ideology of future political leaders like Vanlawma. McCall's progressive policies complemented the YLA's cultural influence, which transitioned to political activism with the founding of the Mizo Union.

==== World War II ====
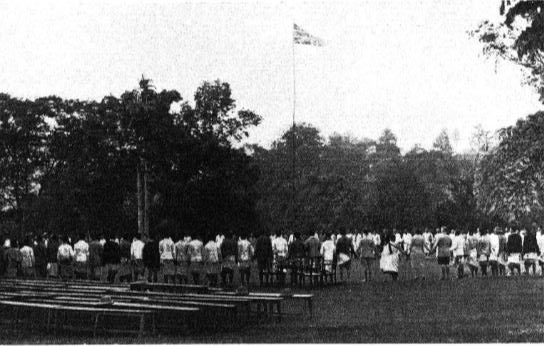
Lushai chiefs pledging allegiance to the Union Jack during World War II

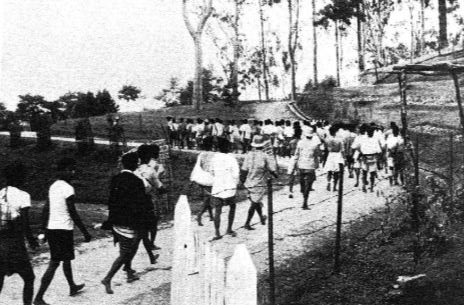
Lushai recruits departing for enlistment

In April 1942, during the Japanese occupation of Burma, Superintendent Anthony Gilchrist McCall of the Lushai Hills implemented the Total Defence Scheme (TDS) to counter the threat of Japanese invasion. He secured the loyalty of 300 tribal chiefs to the British Crown and prepared for asymmetrical warfare, including guerrilla tactics, scorched earth measures, and strategic ambushes. Despite McCall's recall in 1943, the TDS, aided by Australian trainers like Colonel Parsons, successfully defended the region, contributing to the Japanese retreat from India's borderlands by late 1944.

==== Pre-independence ====
The Mizo Union, while largely supporting union with India, faced internal divisions as a right-wing faction emerged, favouring alternatives like Prof. Coupland's Crown Colony Scheme, which proposed a unified British colony for Zo-Kuki-Chin areas. This faction later formed the United Mizo Freedom Organization (UMFO) under Burmese Mizo influence, led by Burmese ex-military officer Lalbiakthanga and Lalmawia Khiangte. Known as Zalên Pawl (transl. Party of the Privileged), the UMFO struggled to gain significant support, failing to counteract the Mizo Union's push for integration with India.

=== Post-independence ===
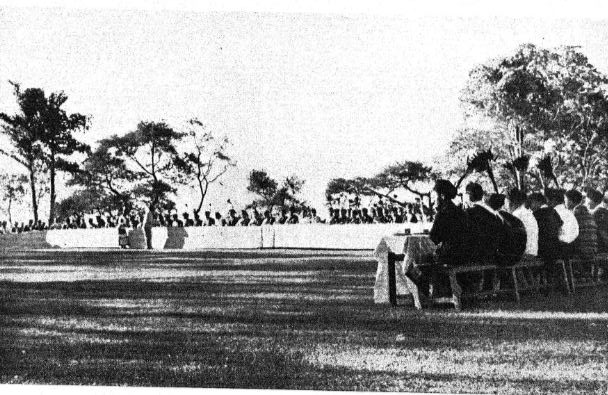
Lushai chiefs having tea at the superintendent's house

On 15 August 1947, India celebrated its Independence Day, but in the Lushai Hills District, no Indian flags were hoisted. This was due to strong opposition from rival factions of the Mizo Union (MU), which resisted recognising Mizoram's accession to the Indian Union.

Later, the Mizo Union (MU) and United Mizo Freedom Organisation (UMFO) emerged as political rivals, with the UMFO losing support after Mizoram joined India. The MU opposed chieftainship, while Superintendent Leonard Lamb Peters supported the chiefs, leading to a civil disobedience movement in 1948. Protests intensified, with the Mizo Union demanding Peters' removal, resulting in mass arrests and crackdowns until Assam's government mediated and replaced Peters in 1949 with Satyen Barkataki. Barkataki would be the first Indian superintendent of the district and would establish the Aizawl-Lungleh road via voluntary labour, which would be widely covered in Indian newspapers.

The Lushai Hills District gained autonomy in 1951, and by 1954, the institution of chieftainship was abolished, ending the chiefs' customary rights in exchange for compensation. On the same year, the district was renamed as the Mizo District. The 1959 Mautam famine devastated the region, killing over a hundred people, which led to the formation of the Mizo National Famine Front, later evolving into the Mizo National Front (MNF), which spearheaded Mizoram's separatist movement.

==== 1966 uprising ====
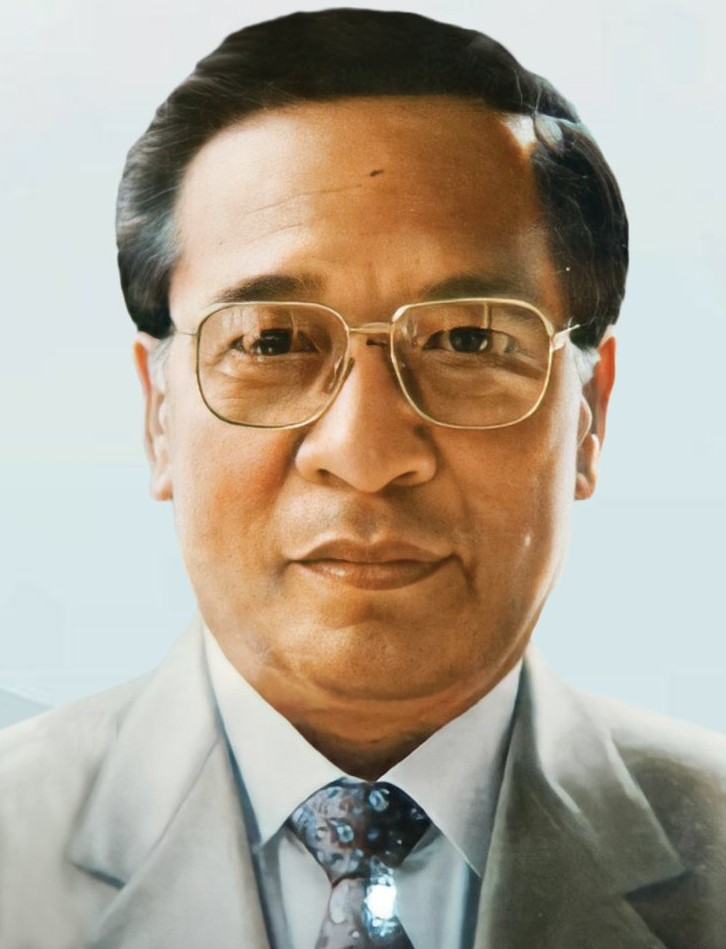
Laldenga, then-president of the Mizo National Front

On 1 March 1966, the Mizo National Front (MNF), led by Laldenga, declared independence from India, marking the beginning of the Mizo Uprising. In their declaration of independence, they appealed to the United Nations for recognition and sought support from neighbouring countries, such as China, United States, Japan, France, Indonesia and the United Kingdom. However, none of the countries the MNF appealed via their embassies and conculs helped them.

The movement had been brewing for years, fuelled by grievances such as the 1959 Mauṭam famine and perceived neglect by the Assam government. Mizo leaders, having gained external support and arms from East Pakistan, launched Operation Jericho, a surprise offensive targeting Assam Rifles posts, the Aizawl treasury, and key administrative buildings. The Indian government, caught off guard, responded with unprecedented military force, including the first and only aerial bombing of its own territory. Aizawl was targeted on 5 March 1966 in the Bombing of Aizawl.

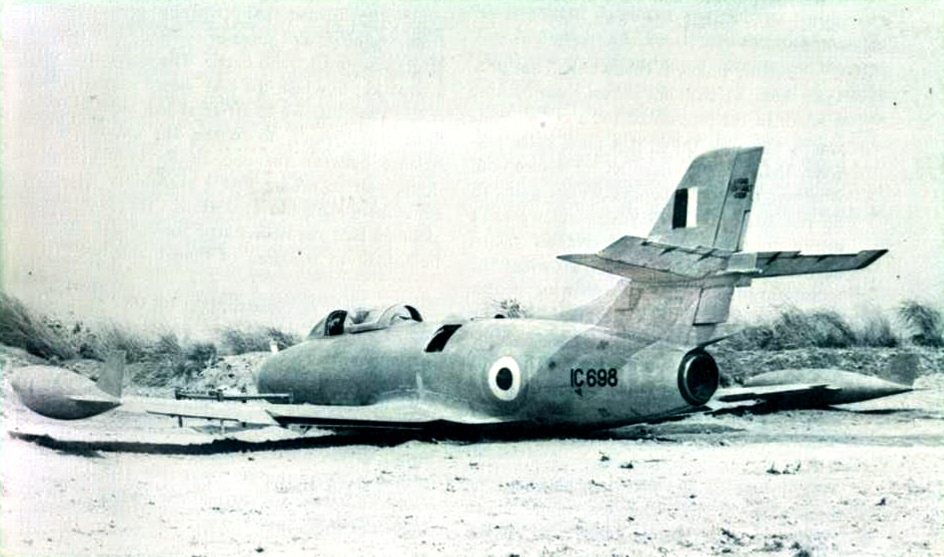
An Indian Air Force MD 450 Toofani, the jet used during the 1966 airstrikes on Aizawl, marking the only instance of India bombing its own territory.

To respond to the ensuing insurgency, the army proposed Operation Accomplishment to demolish smaller villages and merge the populations to larger centres, contributed with input from Sam Manekshaw and Sagat Singh. The scheme oversaw numerous human rights abuses. The Indian army burnt down 21 villages, gutted 2133 houses and raped 54 women in the evacuations. A total of 17 churches were burnt down, and others were occupied with worship restricted. Despite the failure of the initial uprising, the MNF remained active, operating from bases in East Pakistan and Burma, eventually leading to peace negotiations in the 1980s.

=== Union Territory (1972–1987) ===
Mizoram was granted Union Territory status on 21 January 1972, following years of insurgency. Although this provided Mizos with greater autonomy, it fell short of full statehood, and the Mizo National Front (MNF) continued its armed struggle for complete independence.

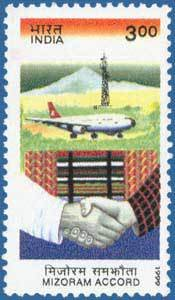
Mizoram Accord mentioned on Stamp of India (1999)

However, in 1973, the Indian central government expelled foreign missionaries, which unintentionally led to a revival of indigenous Mizo culture. One of the most notable revivals was Chapchâr Kût, a traditional Mizo new harvest year festival that had faded under Christian influence.

In 1973, the first Chief Minister Ch. Chhûnga, wearing traditional Mizo attire, officially inaugurated the festival's return. While Chapchar Kut was revived, it underwent Christianization, with zû (rice beer) omitted and new elements like dance formations inspired by David's Star introduced.

=== Statehood (1987–present) ===
After years of diplomatic efforts, Prime Minister Rajiv Gandhi and MNF leader Laldenga signed the Mizoram Peace Accord on 30 June 1986. granting full statehood on 20 February 1987, becoming India's 23rd state.

The state was given two seats in the Parliament, one each in the Lok Sabha and in the Rajya Sabha, marking the beginning of a peaceful and democratic era.

== Geography ==
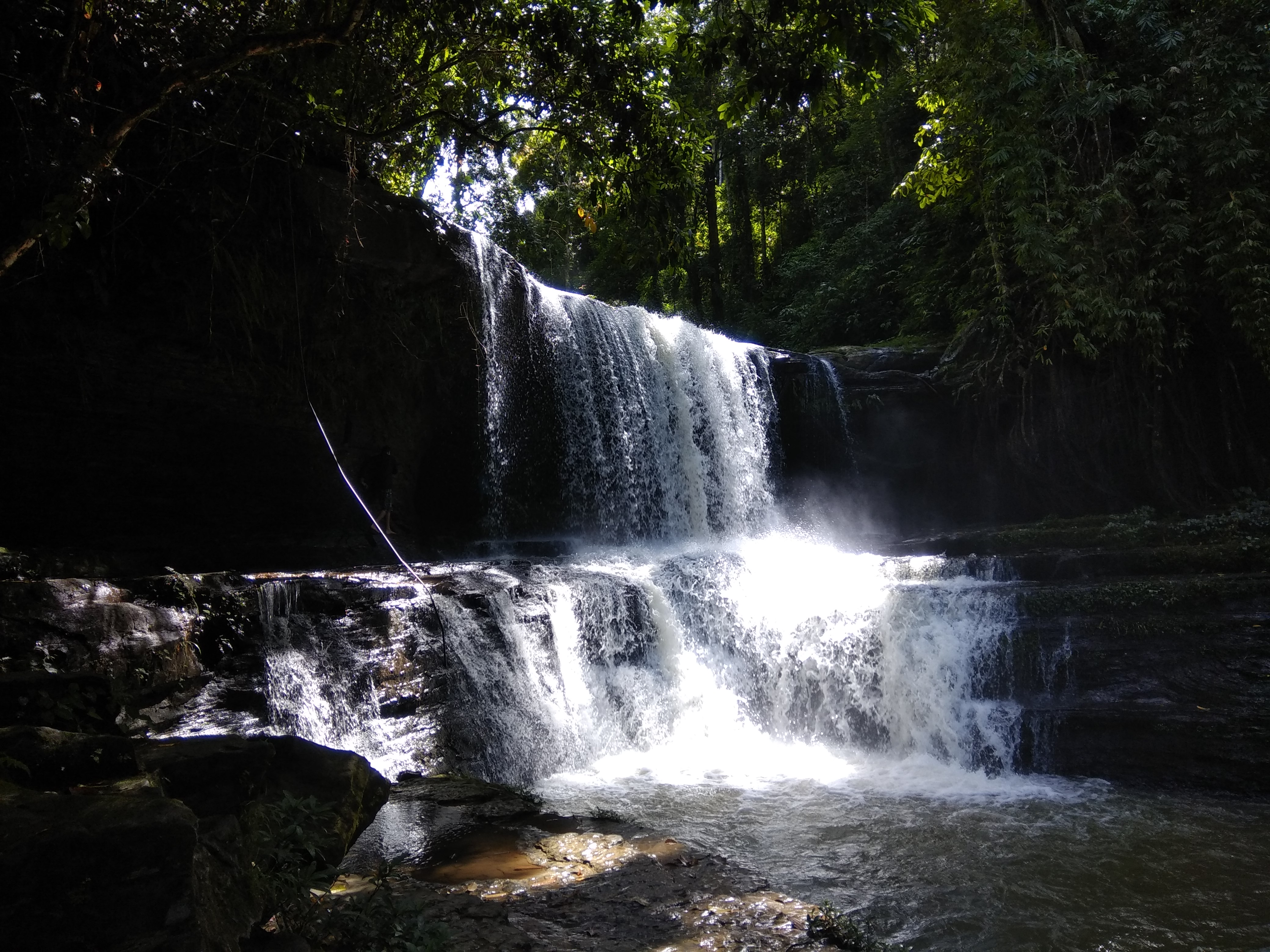
Tuirihiau falls

Mizoram is a landlocked state in North East India whose southern part shares 722 kilometres long international borders with Myanmar and Bangladesh, and northern part share domestic borders with Manipur, Assam and Tripura. It is the fifth smallest state of India with 21,087 km^{2} (8,142 sq mi). It extends from 21°56'N to 24°31'N latitudes, and 92°16'E to 93°26'E longitudes. The tropic of cancer runs through the state nearly at its middle. The maximum north–south distance is 285 km, while maximum east–west stretch is 115 km.

Mizoram is a land of rolling hills, valleys, rivers and lakes. As many as 21 major hill ranges or peaks of different heights run through the length and breadth of the state, with plains scattered here and there. The average height of the hills to the west of the state is about 1,000 metres (3,300 ft). Phawngpui Tlang also known as the Blue Mountain, situated in the southeastern part of the state, is the highest peak in Mizoram at 2,210 metres (7,250 ft). The state is hilly and mountainous with various slope percentages. Low slopes are used for wet rice cultivation, slightly higher slopes in the 8-20% range function for terraced cultivation. Medium slopes from 20 to 50% are used for horticulture, and high-end slopes above 50% are used for forestry. (Note: Percentages represent the gradient over 100m, 10% is a gradient of 10 over 100m.) The largest valley in the state is located in Champhai with 1,356.5 hectares (3,352 acres) and an elevation of 1,300 metres (4,300 ft).

About 76% of the state is covered by forests, 8% is fallows land, 3% is barren and considered uncultivable area, while cultivable and sown area constitutes the rest. Slash-and-burn or jhum cultivation, though discouraged, remains in practice in Mizoram and affects its topography. A report by Ministry of Environment, Forest and Climate Change in 2021 states that Mizoram has the highest forest cover as a percentage of its geographical area of any Indian state, being 84.53% forest.

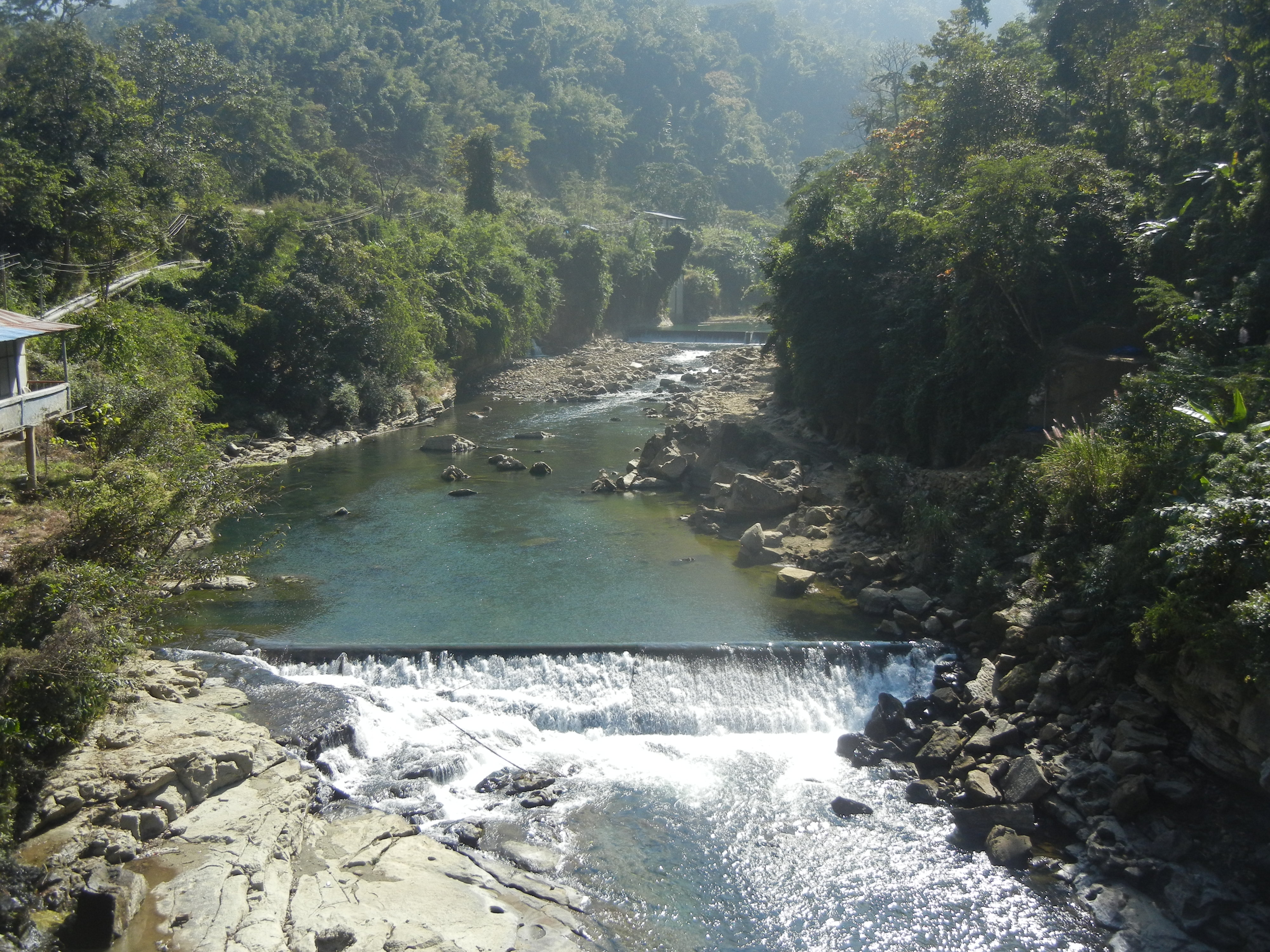
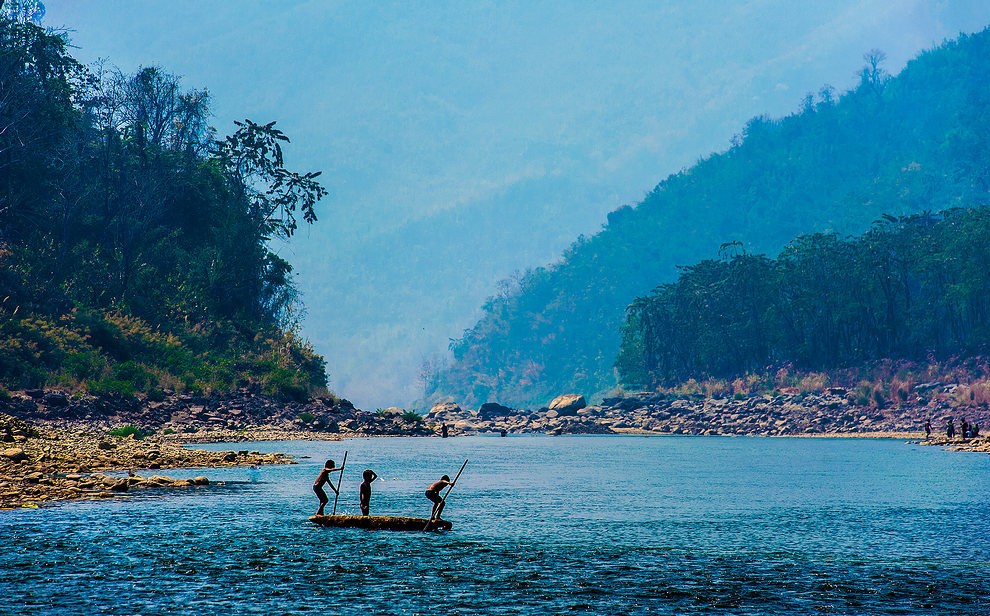
Tlawng River (top) and Tuipui river of Mizoram

Mizoram terrain is, according to the Geological Survey of India, an immature topography, and the physiographic expression consists of several almost north–south longitudinal valleys containing series of small and flat hummocks, mostly anticlinal, parallel to sub-parallel hill ranges and narrow adjoining synclinal valleys with series of topographic highs. The general geology of western Mizoram consists of repetitive succession of Neogene sedimentary rocks of the Surma Group and Tipam Formation such as sandstone, siltstone, mudstone and rare pockets of shell limestone. The eastern part is the Barail Group. Mizoram lies in seismic zone V, according to the India Meteorological Department; as with other northeastern states of India, this means the state has the highest risk of earthquakes relative to other parts of India. The risk of the seismic zone combined with diversity in geology, geomorphology, rapid urban growth and monsoon seasons has also made it significantly at risk of landslides. The Mizoram government classified 5 landslide hazard zones as a result. Aizawl is ranked first in landslide frequency followed by Lunglei.

The biggest river by water volume in Mizoram is the Chhimtuipui (Kaladan) river. It originates in Chin state near Vanum village in Burma at an altitude of 2,325 metres (7,628 ft). It enters Mizoram via Sabawngte village (Saiha) and flows north to the Lawngtlai in the southern tip of Mizoram and forms the international boundary before merging back to the Tiau river flowing opposite it. Although many more rivers and streams drain the hill ranges, the most important and useful rivers are the Tlawng, Tut, Tuirial and Tuivawl which flow through the northern territory and eventually join the Barak River in Cachar District. The rivers have a gentle drainage gradient, particularly in the south.

=== Climate ===
Mizoram has a humid, subtropical climate with temperate to warm summers ranging from 20 to 30 °C (68 to 86 °F). Winters experience a cool and arid ambiance in a temperature range of 10 to 20 °C (50 to 68 °F). The region is influenced by monsoons, raining heavily from June to September which sustains high humidity and lush forestry. The climate pattern is moist tropical to moist sub-tropical, with average state rainfall 254 centimetres (100 in) per annum. In the capital Aizawl, rainfall is about 215 centimetres (85 in) and in Lunglei, another major centre, about 350 centimetres (140 in). The state is in a region where cyclones and landslides can cause weather-related emergencies. The rainy season is the longest and lasts for six months, starting with violent storms beginning in the Bay of Bengal which accompany hailstorms, thunderstorms and cyclones.

Climate data for Aizawl, the capital of Mizoram
Month	Jan	Feb	Mar	Apr	May	Jun	Jul	Aug	Sep	Oct	Nov	Dec	Year
Mean daily maximum °C (°F)	20.4 (68.7)	21.7 (71.1)	25.2 (77.4)	26.8 (80.2)	26.3 (79.3)	25.5 (77.9)	25.3 (77.5)	25.5 (77.9)	25.7 (78.3)	24.7 (76.5)	23.0 (73.4)	21.0 (69.8)	24.3 (75.7)
Mean daily minimum °C (°F)	11.4 (52.5)	12.8 (55.0)	15.6 (60.1)	17.5 (63.5)	18.1 (64.6)	18.9 (66.0)	19.1 (66.4)	19.1 (66.4)	19.2 (66.6)	18.0 (64.4)	15.1 (59.2)	12.2 (54.0)	16.4 (61.6)
Average precipitation mm (inches)	13.4 (0.53)	23.4 (0.92)	73.4 (2.89)	167.7 (6.60)	289.0 (11.38)	406.1 (15.99)	320.4 (12.61)	320.6 (12.62)	305.2 (12.02)	183.7 (7.23)	43.2 (1.70)	15.3 (0.60)	2,161.4 (85.09)

=== Soil ===
The soil of Mizoram is young and consists of sedimentary formations. Generally, soils consist of properties of being loamy, deep, well-drained and acidic in reaction. Across the districts of Mizoram the soil is free of rocks with the exception of in the southernmost areas. The consistency is considered satisfactory. Clay-like soil with poor drainage is typically found restricted to few valleys while loam is common on hills. Nutrition-wise, the soils are deficient due to high levels of forest cover, high rainfall and dense vegetation, leading to high organic carbon and nitrogen content. Phosphorus is also lacking up to as high as 40% of all soil due to the strong acidityand presence of exchangeable aluminium. Nitrogen deficiency is restricted to the western and southern borders of the state while potassium is lacking in the western areas of the state.

=== Biodiversity ===
State symbols of Mizoram
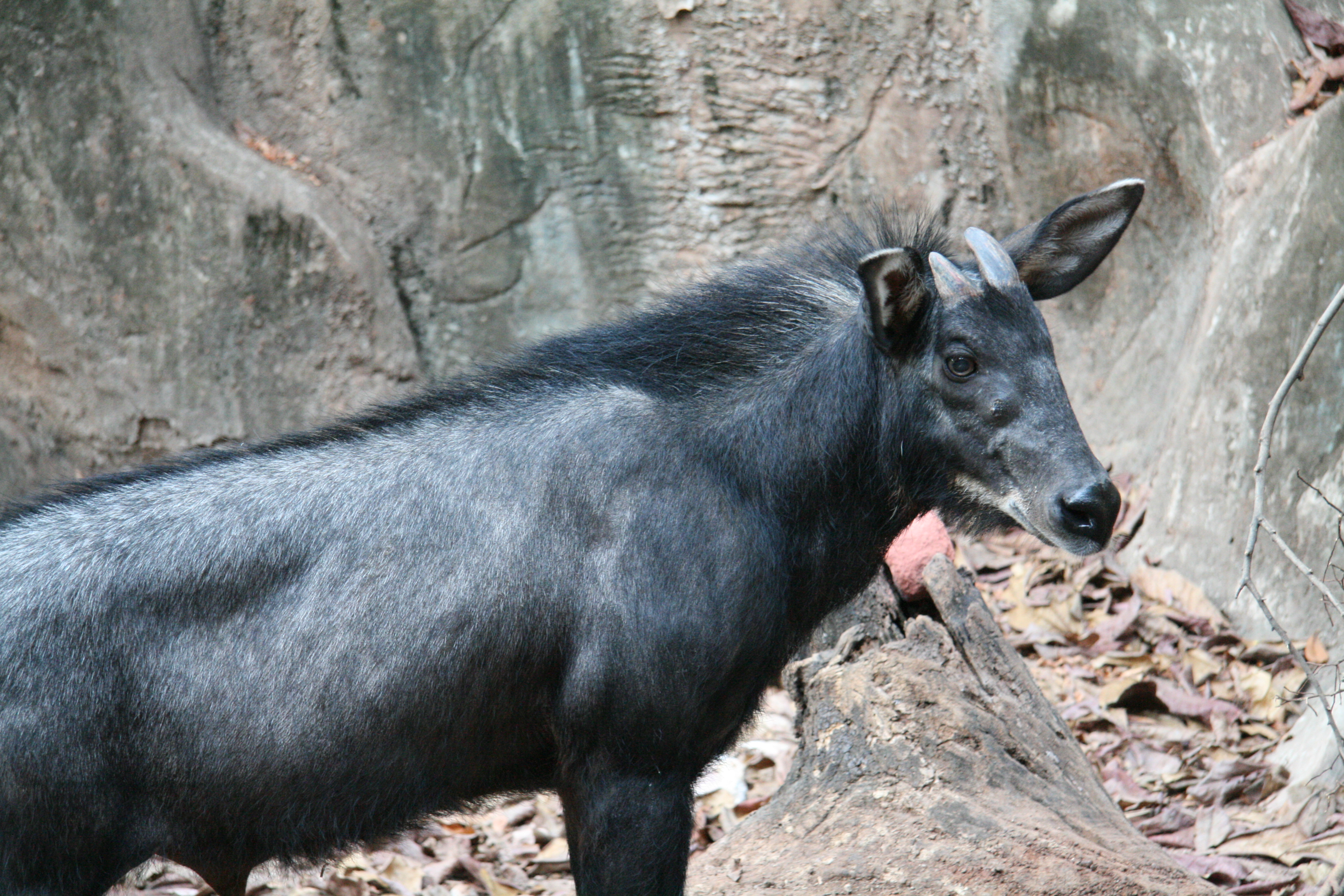
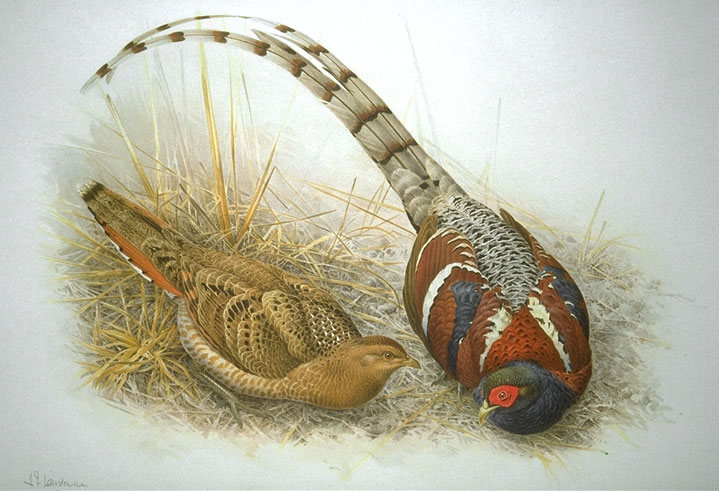
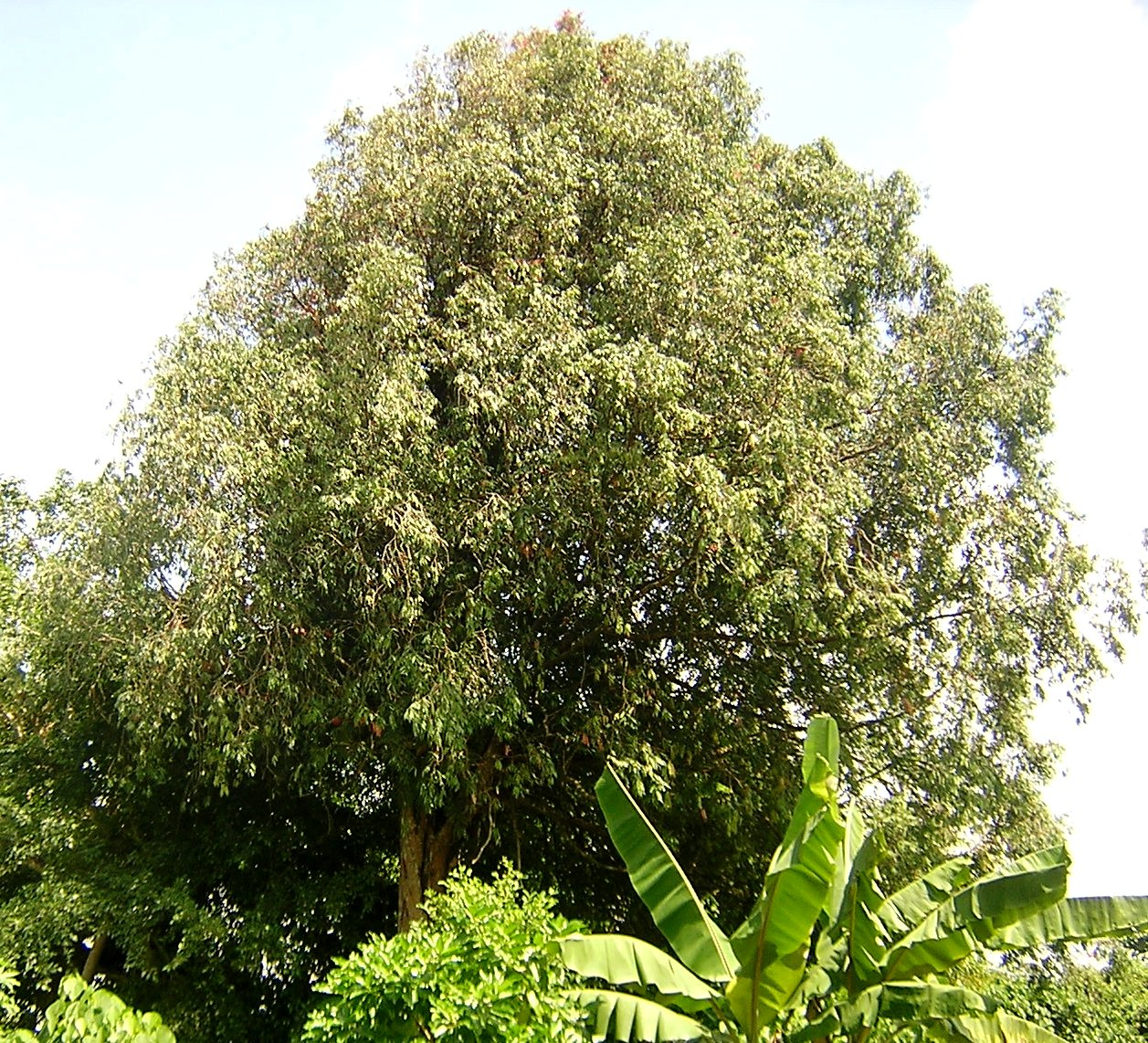
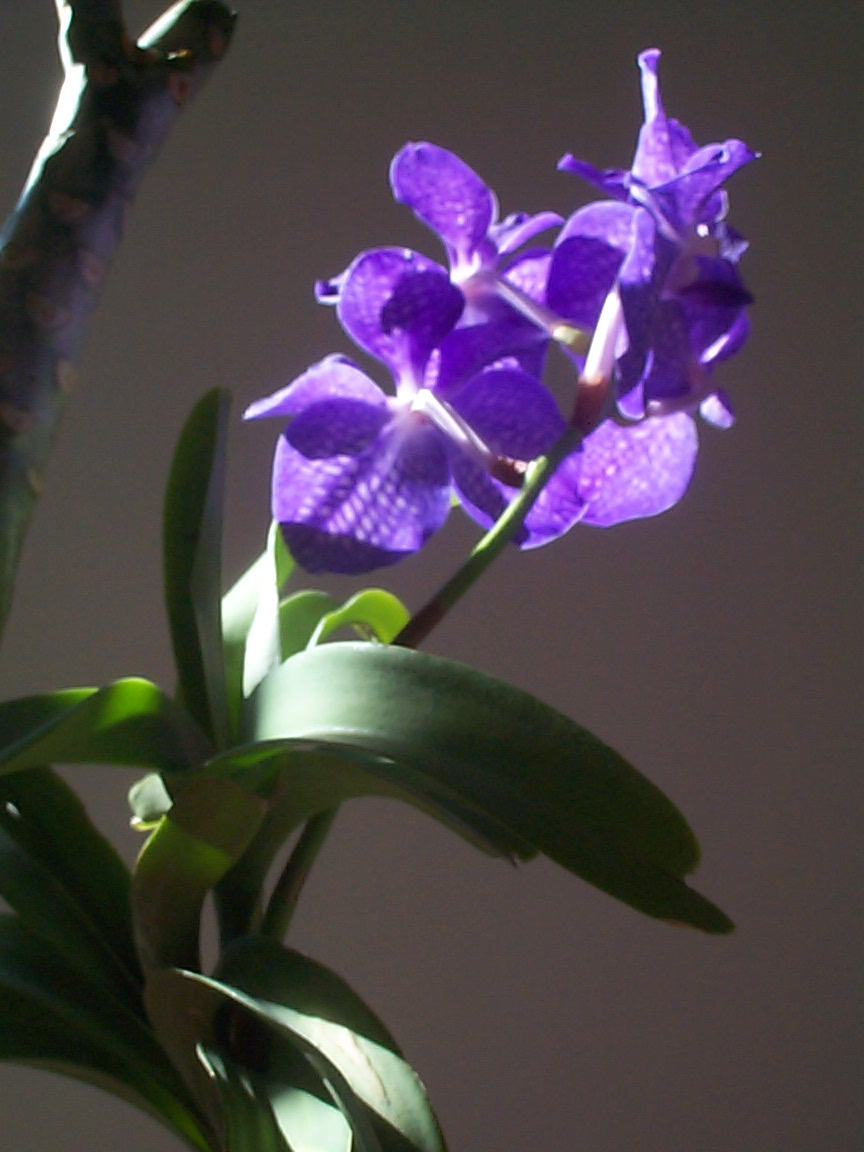
Animal	Serow (Saza)
Bird	Mrs. Hume's pheasant (Vavu)
Tree	Indian rose chestnut (Herhse)
Flower	Red Vanda (Senhri)

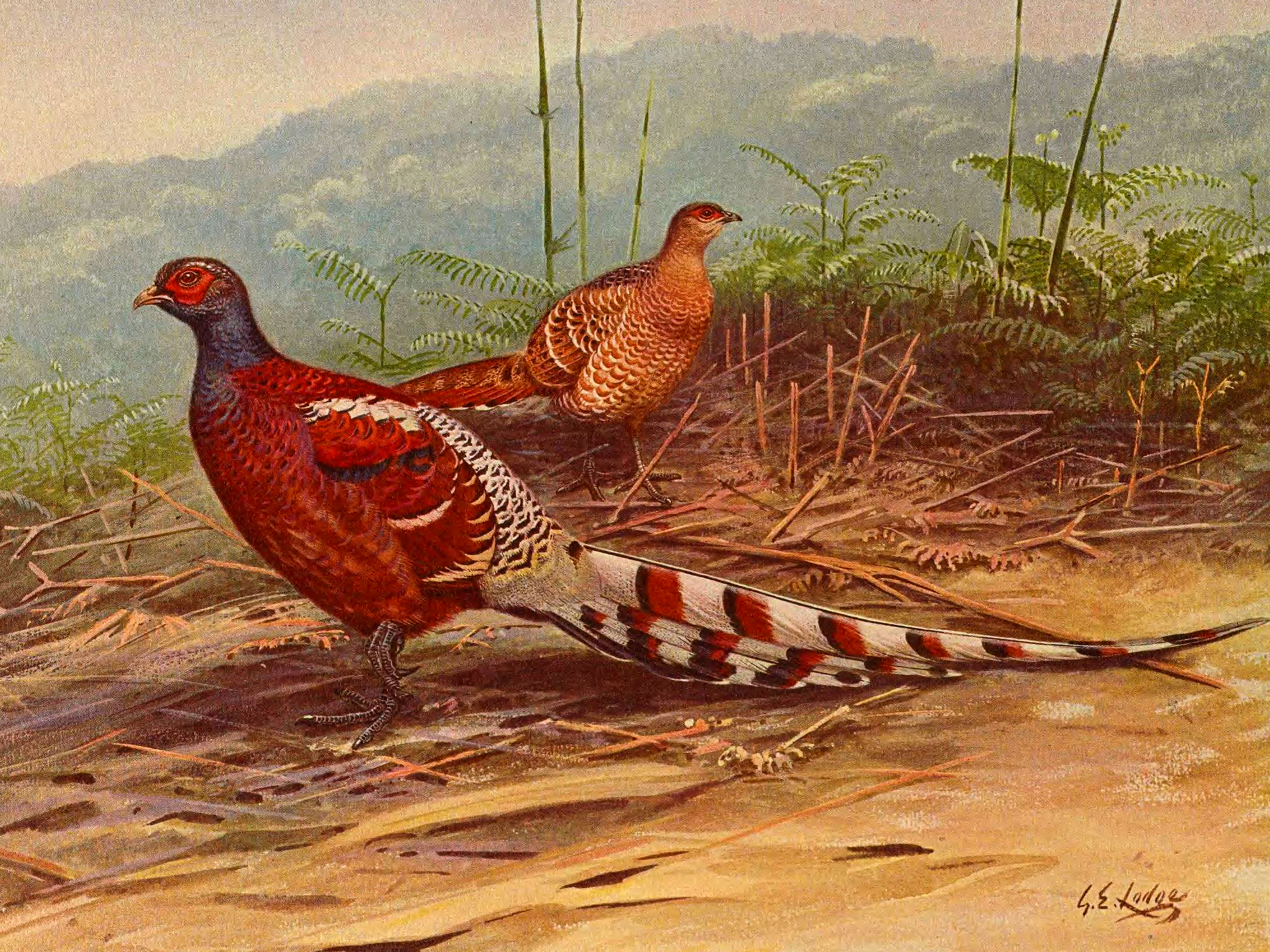
Vavu (Mrs. Hume's pheasant) is the state bird (top) and Senhri (Renanthera imschootiana) the state flower of Mizoram.

Mizoram has the fourth highest total forest cover with 17,820 square kilometres (6,880 sq mi), with a percentage area of 84.53% of forest cover in the 2021 forestry report. Tropical semi-evergreen, tropical moist deciduous, subtropical broadleaved hill and subtropical pine forests are the most common vegetation types found in Mizoram. Bamboo is common in the state, typically intermixed with other forest vegetation; about 9,245 km^{2} (44%) of the state's area is bamboo bearing. The state and central governments of India have cooperated to reserve and protect 67% of the land covered by forests, and additional 15% by management. Only 17% of the land is non-forested area for cultivation, industry, mining, housing and other commercial human activity. Satellite data suggests 91% of state's geographical area is covered by forests.

Historically, Mizoram participated in jhum cultivation (shifting cultivation). During the 1970s and 80s, jhum cultivation decreased from 58,000 hectares (140,000 acres) to 40,000 hectares (99,000 acres) despite a population increase. In 1986, 70% of the total population participated in jhumming. In 1984, to deal with deforestation, the Mizoram government passed the New Land Use Policy (NULP). The act provided that all lands other than towns and land allotted for permanent cultivation would be classified as a natural and protected forest. Commercial feeling became prohibited with exceptions for home consumption. Lands were leased to rural families to practice jhumming.

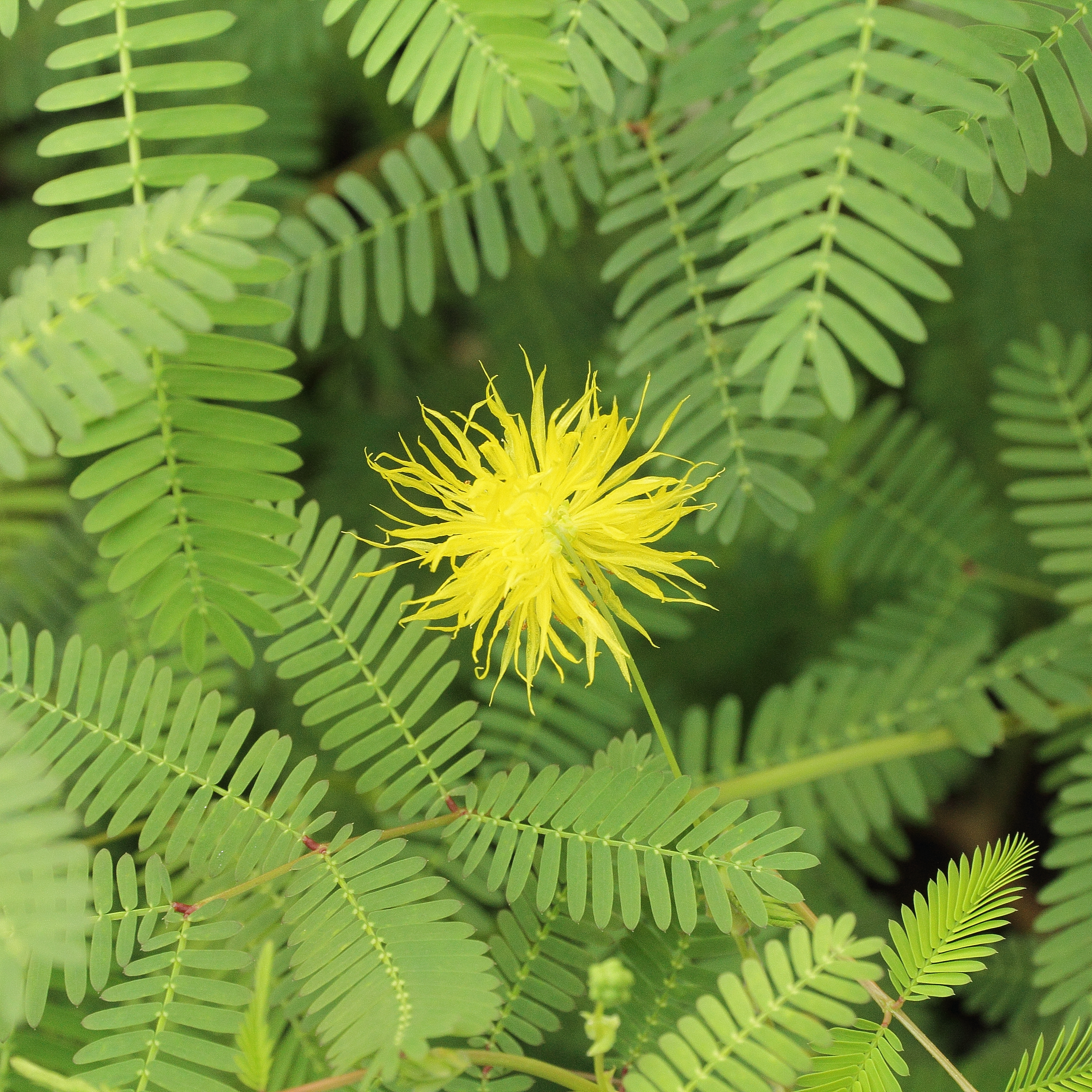
Neptunia oleracea

Mizoram is host to numerous species of birds, wildlife and flora. About 640 species of birds have been identified in the state, many of which are endemic to the Himalayan foothills and southeast Asia. Of the birds found in Mizoram forests, 27 are on the worldwide threatened species lists and eight are on the critically endangered list. Prominent birds spotted in Mizoram include those from the families of Phasianidae, Anatidae, Ciconiidae, Threskiornithidae, Ardeidae, Pelecanidae, Phalacrocoracidae, Falconidae, Accipitridae, Otididae, Rallidae, Heliornithidae, Turnicidae, Burhinidae, Charadriidae, Scolopacidae, Jacanidae, Laridae, Columbidae, Psittacidae, Cuculidae, Strigidae, Caprimulgidae, Apodidae, Alcedinidae, Meropidae, Bucerotidae, Ramphastidae, Picidae, Pittidae, Laniidae, Campephagidae, Dicruridae, Corvidae, Paridae, Hirundinidae, Cisticolidae, Pycnonotidae, Sylviidae, Timaliidae, Sittidae, Sturnidae, Turdidae, Dicaedae, Chloropseidae, Ploceidae, Motacillidae, Fringillidae, Nectariniidae and Muscicapidae.

The state is also host to a variety of fauna, just like its sister northeastern Indian states. Mammal species observed in the Mizoram forests include slow loris (Nycticebus coucang), red serow (Capricornis rubidus), which is the state animal, goral (Nemorhaedus goral), tiger (Panthera tigris), leopard (Panthera pardus), clouded leopard (Neofelis nebulosi), leopard cat (Prionailurus bengalensis), Bengal fox (Vulpes bengalensis), and Asiatic black bear (Ursus thibetanus). Primates seen include stump-tailed macaque (Macaca arctoides), Western hoolock gibbon (Hylobates hoolock), Phayre's leaf monkey (Trachypithecus phayrei) and capped langur (Trachypithecus pileatus). The state is also home to many reptiles, amphibians, fish and invertebrates.

The state has two national parks (Blue Mountain (Phawngpui) National Park and Murlen National Park) and six wildlife sanctuaries (Dampa Tiger Reserve (largest), Lengteng Wildlife Sanctuary, Ngengpui Wildlife Sanctuary, Tawi Wildlife Sanctuary, Khawnglung Wildlife Sanctuary, and Thorangtlang Wildlife Sanctuary).

== Demographics ==
Historical population
Year	Pop.	±%
1901	82,434	—
1911	91,204	+10.6%
1921	98,406	+7.9%
1931	124,404	+26.4%
1941	152,786	+22.8%
1951	196,202	+28.4%
1961	266,063	+35.6%
1971	332,390	+24.9%
1981	493,757	+48.5%
1991	689,573	+39.7%
2001	888,573	+28.9%
2011	1,091,014	+22.8%
Source: Census of India

Mizoram has a population of 1,091,014 with 552,339 males and 538,675 females. This reflects a 22.8% growth since 2001 census; still, Mizoram is second least populated state of India. The sex ratio of the state is 976 females per thousand males, higher than the national ratio 940. The density of population is 52 persons per square kilometre.

The literacy rate of Mizoram in 2011 was 91.58 per cent, higher than the national average 74.04 per cent, and second best among all the states of India. About 52% of Mizoram population lives in urban areas, much higher than India's average. Over one third of the population of Mizoram lives in Aizawl district, which hosts the capital.

=== Largest cities or towns ===
Largest cities or towns in Mizoram
Rank		District	Pop.
1	Aizawl	Aizawl	415,000
2	Lunglei	Lunglei	80,000
3	Champhai	Champhai	44,000
4	Saiha	Siaha (Saiha)	35,500
5	Kolasib	Kolasib	34,200
6	Serchhip	Serchhip	30,010
7	Lawngtlai	Lawngtlai	29,400
8	Saitual	Saitual	16,300
9	Khawzawl	Khawzawl	15,500
10	Vairengte	Kolasib	14,550

=== Ethnic groups ===
The great majority of Mizoram's population consists of several ethnic tribes who are either culturally or linguistically linked. These ethnic groups are collectively known as Mizos (Mi means People, Zo meaning the name of a progenitor; Mizo thus is People of Zo origin).

Sometime in the 16th century, the first batch of Mizo crossed Tiau River and settled in Mizoram and they were called as Kukis by Bengalis. The term Kuki means the inhabitants of the interior and inaccessible mountain tracts. Sometimes grouped as Kuki-Chin tribes, The First batch were called Old Kukis, which are the Biate, Ranglong and the Hrangkhol, and the second batch that followed include Lushei (or Lusei), Paite, Lai, Mara, Ralte, Hmar, Thadou, Shendus, and several other.

The Bru (Reang), Chakma, Tanchangya are some non-Kuki tribes of Mizoram, with some suggestion that some of these are Indo-Aryan in their origins. The Bnei Menashe tribe claim Jewish descent.

The diversity of tribal groups reflects the historical immigration patterns. Different tribes and sub-tribes arrived in the present Mizoram, in successive waves and settled down in different parts of the state. Further, as they arrived, there were raids, fear of raids and intertribal feuds. The resulting isolation and separation created numerous tribes and sub-tribes.

Other than tribal groups, other ethnic groups inhabit Mizoram including Bengalis and Nepalis. Nepali Gorkhas, for example, were encouraged to settle in Aizawl area and other parts of Mizoram during the British colonial times. Thousands of their descendants are now residents of Mizoram.

=== Protected demographic category ===
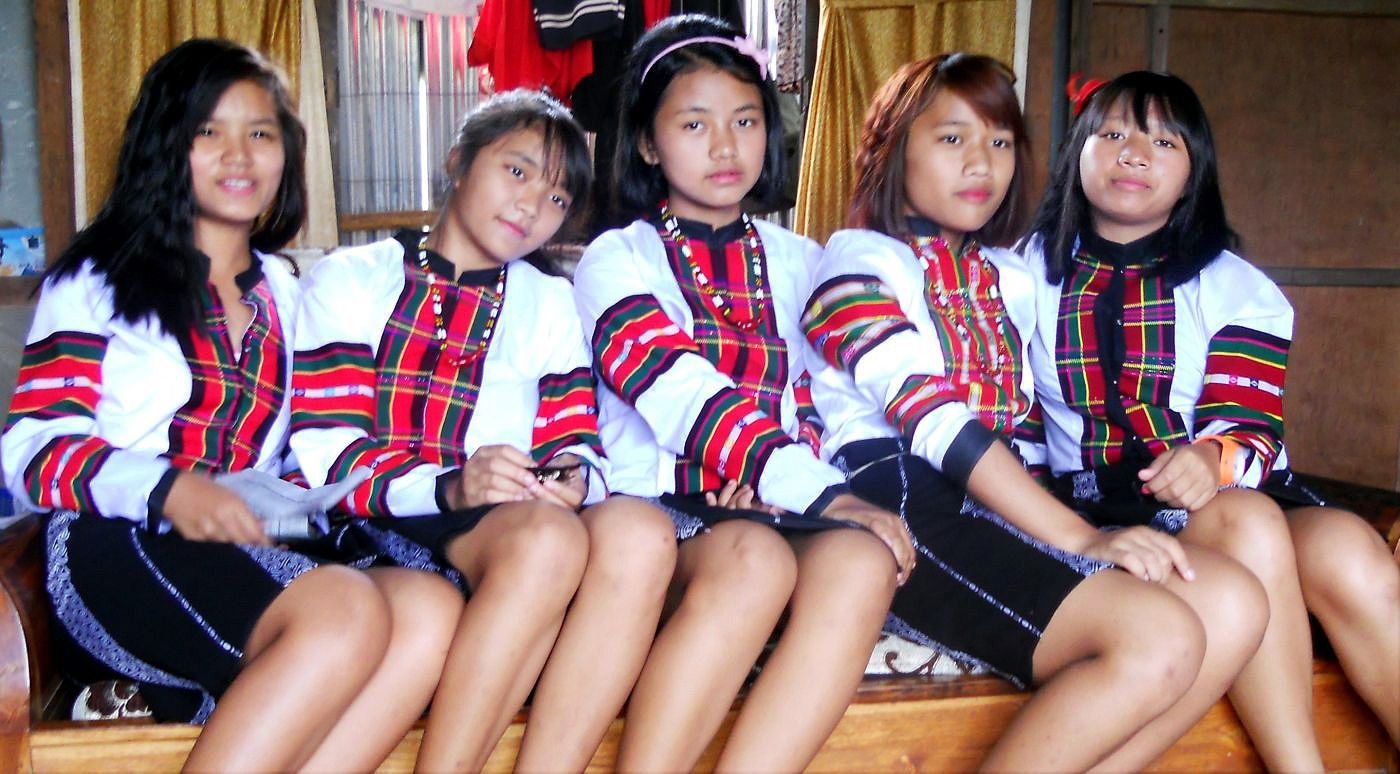
Mizo girls in Lushei tribe traditional dress.

According to 2011 census, Mizoram had 1,036,115 people (nearly 95% of total) classified as Scheduled Tribe, the highest concentration of protected tribal people in all states of India. This demographic classification, given to Mizoram tribes since the 1950s, has provided reservations and extra resources in education and government job opportunities, a preferential treatment as a means to accelerate their integration with mainstream society.

=== Languages ===
Languages of Mizoram in 2011
1. Mizo (73.1%)
2. Chakma (8.51%)
3. Mara (3.84%)
4. Tripuri (2.99%)
5. Pawi (2.62%)
6. Paite (2.04%)
7. Hmar (1.65%)
8. Bengali (1.37%)
9. Other (3.85%)

Mizo and English are the official languages of the state.

=== Religion ===
Religion in Mizoram (2011)
1. Christianity (87.2%)
2. Buddhism (8.51%)
3. Hinduism (2.75%)
4. Islam (1.35%)
5. Other or not religious (0.23%)

==== Statistics ====
Religious Statistics of Mizoram
Religion	1971		1981		1991		2001		2011	
Religion	Pop.	%	Pop.	%	Pop.	%	Pop.	%	Pop.	%
Christianity	286,141	87.00	383,000	90.00	591,000	90.50	888,000	90.00	956,331	87.16
Buddhism	22,647	6.81	40,429	8.19	54,024	7.83	70,494	7.93	93,411	8.51
Hinduism	16,000	5.40	17,500	4.10	27,000	4.10	31,500	3.20	30,136	2.75
Islam	1,200	0.40	1,500	0.35	2,000	0.30	10,000	1.01	14,832	1.35
Sikhism	500	0.17	600	0.14	800	0.12	1,000	0.10	1,286	0.12
Jainism	50	0.02	60	0.01	70	0.01	90	0.01	376	0.03
ORP	1,000	0.34	1,500	0.35	2,500	0.38	5,000	0.51	8,000	0.73
Not stated	250	0.08	300	0.07	600	0.09	1,000	0.10	2,300	0.21
Total	297,000	100	425,000	100	650,000	100	987,000	100	1,106,206	100

The majority (87%) of Mizos are Christians in various denominations, predominantly Presbyterian. Mizoram has a significant Theravada Buddhist population of 8.5%, who are mainly Chakma people, making them the largest religious minority in the region, followed by Hindus at 2.7% according to the 2011 census. There are several thousand people, mostly ethnic Mizo, who have converted to Judaism claiming to be one of the lost Judaic tribe group Bnei Menashe, with descent from the biblical Manasseh.

==== Christianity ====
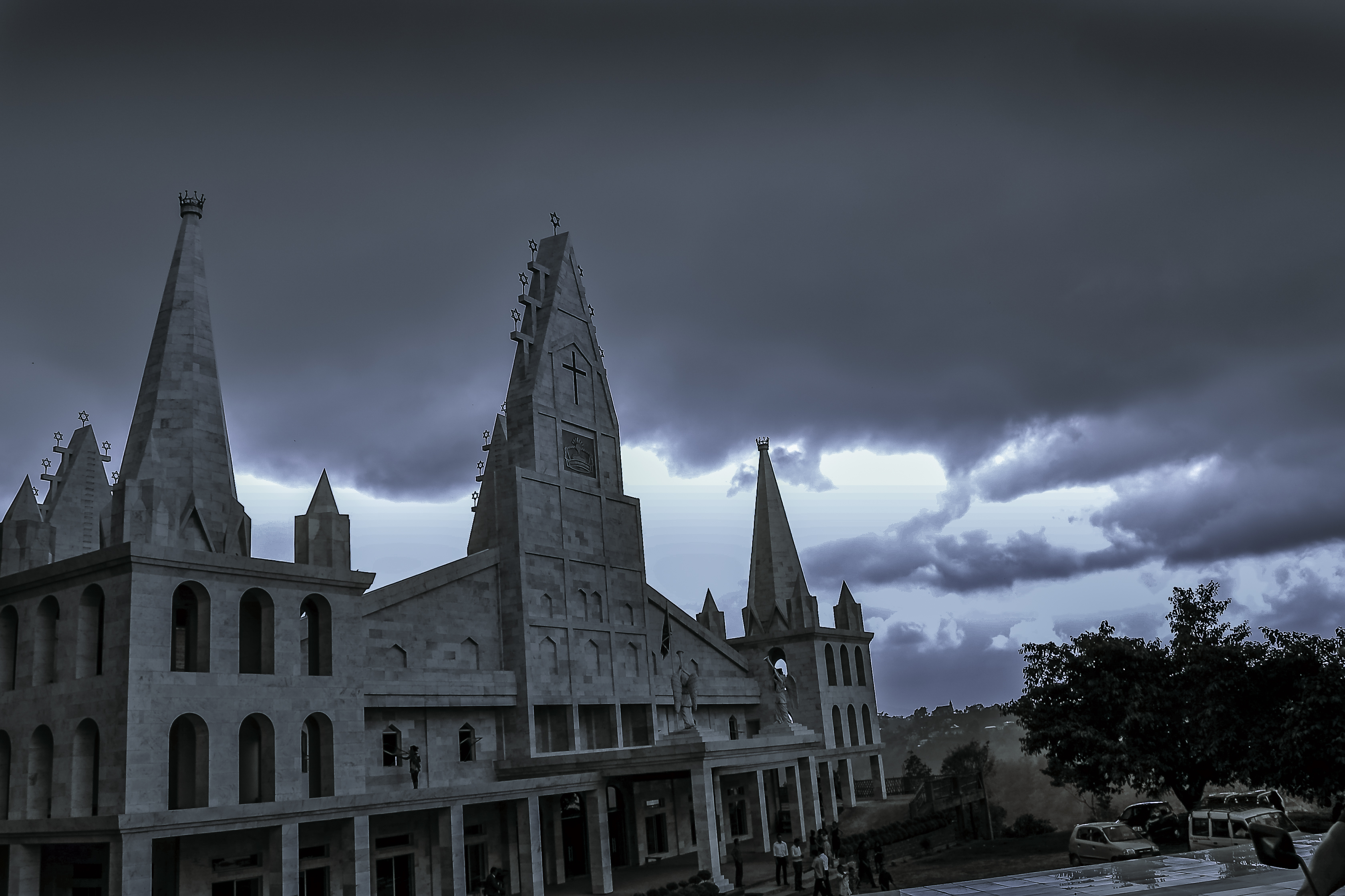
Solomon's Temple, Aizawl

The major Christian denomination is the Mizoram Presbyterian Church, which was established by the Welsh missionary David Evan Jones starting in 1894. By the time India gained independence from British Empire, some 80% of Lushei tribe people had converted to Christianity. The Mizoram Presbyterian Church is one of the constituted bodies of the General Assembly of the Presbyterian Church of India at Shillong in Meghalaya; it became the dominant Christian group in north Mizoram hills. In the southern hills of Mizoram, the Baptist Church had the dominant following.

==== Buddhism ====
According to 2011 census report, there are 93,411 people (8.51%) who follow Buddhism in Mizoram. The Chakmas and Tanchangya have been Buddhist for many centuries

==== Hinduism ====
Hinduism in Mizoram is a minority faith followed by 30,136 (2.75%) of the Mizoram population. 12 temples operate in Mizoram, managed by Central Gorkha Mandir Sanchalan Samiti. Most of the Hindus in Mizoram are Gorkhas and Bru Reangs Most of the Bru Reangs have left Mizoram following the 1997 Bru Reang genocide.

A 2023 study discovered 8th century CE Hindu and Buddhist-influenced sculptures at Kolalian village in the Mamit district. The ancestors of the Gorkha and Bengali Hindus of Mizoram were Gorkha soldiers and Bengali clerks who settled during British rule. Gorkhas arrived in Mizoram in 1871 to liberate Mary Winchester, the daughter of a British tea planter who was abducted by a Mizo tribal chieftain. After liberating her, the British allotted plots for them in the State and many chose to reside there.

Mizoram is a Christian-dominated state. Hindus coexist with Christians peacefully and take part in each other's festivities. Christian influences can be seen in Hindu practices in Mizoram. Temples conduct Sunday service for Hindu deities similar to the Sunday services in Church. In the 'Sunday service', Hindu priests deliver sermons and chant prayers from a standardised 'book of psalms' similar to the Christian Bible Book of Psalms. made from Hindu scripture and includes bhajans and shlokas. The elders of the Hindu community conduct theology classes for Hindu children on Ramayana and Mahabharata. The Dholak is also played with bhajan during the Sunday sangat (gathering). During death ceremonies, the deceased body is carried in coffins like Christians and community members gather to sing bhajans before the final rites.

==== Islam ====
According to the 2011 census, there were 14,832 Muslims in Mizoram or about 1.35% of the population. most of the Muslim concentrated in the Northern region of state. The Quran has also been translated into Mizo by local Muslims.

==== Others ====
There are also a few Mizos who practice Judaism (866 according to the 2001 census) and a modernised traditional Mizo religion called Hnam sakhua, which places a special emphasis on Mizo culture and seeks to revive traditional Mizo values while opposing the influence of Christianity on Mizo people.

A total of 1,367 people practised the Mizo religion according to the 2001 census. This number included, in addition to the original Mizo religion (755 people), adherents of other tribal religions such as Lalchhungkua (279), Lalhnam (122), and Nunna Lalchhungkua (211).

== Politics ==
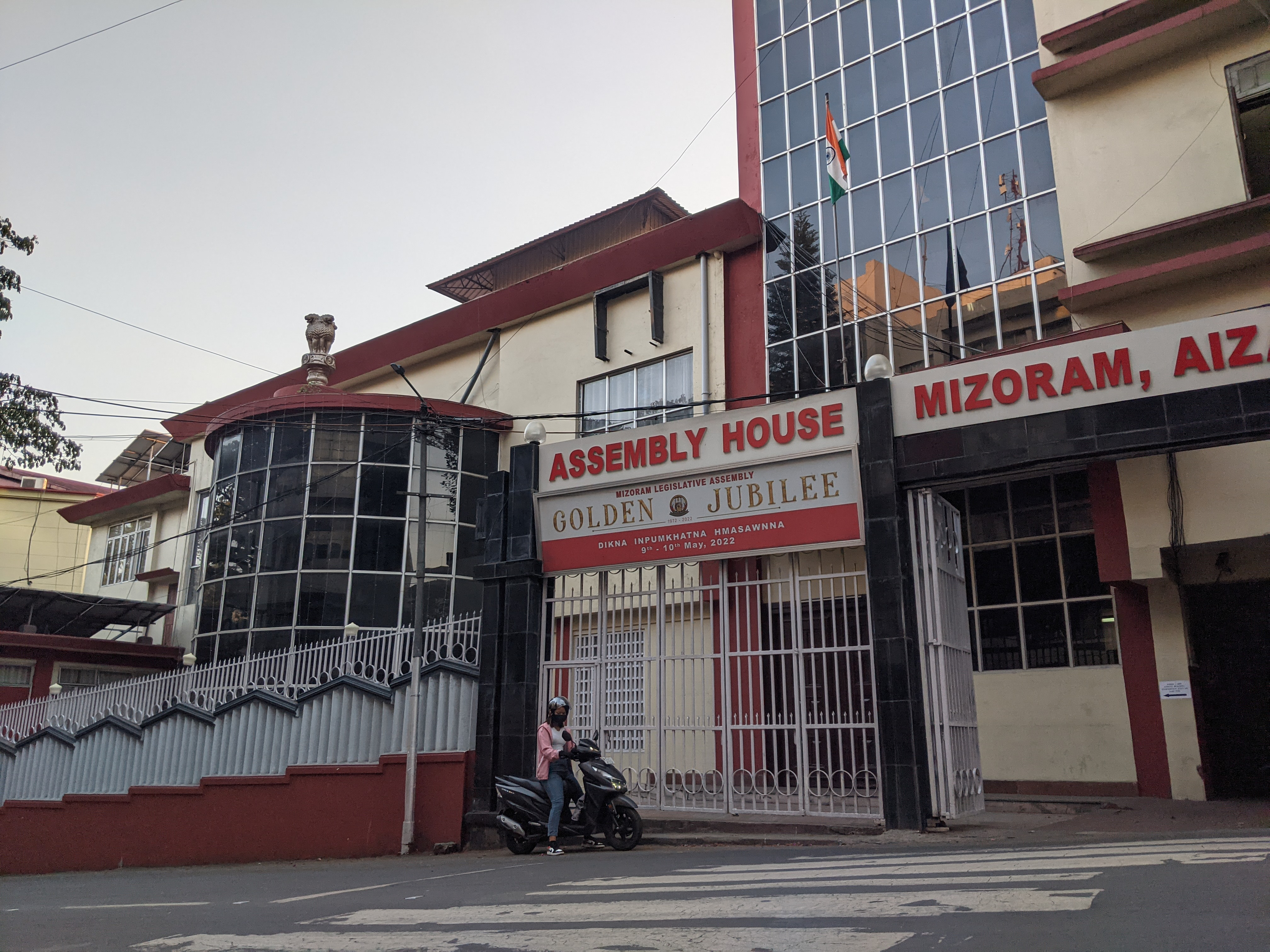
Mizoram Assembly House

Originally village land, locally called ram, was the property of the tribal chief. The institution of chieftainship began in the 16th century. Each village behaved like a small state, and the chief was called Lal. The rule was hereditary, and there were no written laws (the first script for Mizo language was developed by Christian Missionaries Lorraine and Savidge about 1895).

After annexation by the British in the 1890s, the northern part of Mizoram was administered as the Lushai Hills district of Assam, while southern Mizoram was part of Bengal. In 1898, the southern part was transferred from Bengal to Assam. The colonial power retained the chiefs and Mizo customs, including the socially stratified hereditary transfer of political power. In 1937, under Section 6 of the Scheduled District Act, the British administration consolidated executive and legislative political power to the Deputy Commissioner and District magistrates, with village chiefs in advisory role. The political and judiciary powers of chiefs were neither final nor exclusive, thereafter. Rulings could be appealed to courts staffed with British officials. After India gained independence from the colonial rule, the region was granted autonomous status in 1952, where Mizo people formulated their own laws and delivered judicial decisions. The region was renamed as Mizo District within Assam State in April 1954 and in that year, the institution of hereditary chieftainship was abolished, and instead village courts/council were set up.

The representatives of the Lushai Hills Autonomous District Council and the Mizo Union pleaded with the States Reorganisation Commission (SRC) to integrate the Mizo-dominated areas of Tripura and Manipur with the District Council in Assam. The tribal leaders in the northeast were unhappy with the final SRC recommendations and met in Aizawl in 1955 to form a new political party, Eastern India Tribal Union (EITU).

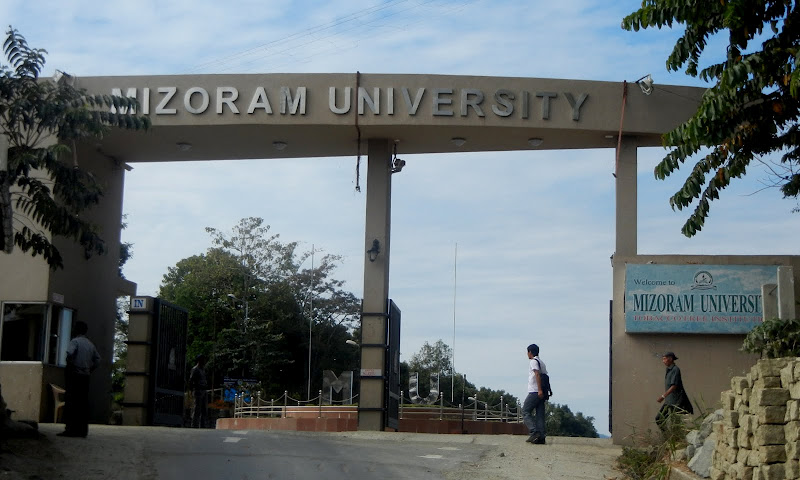
Mizoram Peace Accord was signed in June 1986. The Accord granted political freedoms by making Mizoram a full state of India, and included infrastructure provisions such as a High Court and establishment of Mizoram University (shown).

In the 1950s, the fears of Assamese hegemony and perceived lack of government concern led to growing discontent among the Mizos. The Mizos were particularly dissatisfied with the government's inadequate response to the 1959–60 mautam famine. The Mizo National Famine Front, a body formed for famine relief in 1959, later developed into a new political organisation, the Mizo National Front (MNF) in 1961. The Front sought sovereign independence for the Mizo territory, staging an armed insurrection with the 28 February 1966 uprising against the government. The revolt was suppressed by the government of India, which carried out airstrikes in Aizawl and surrounding areas.

Assam state was split, re-organised into multiple political regions, Mizo hills area was declared Mizoram after the insurgency, and it received status as a Union Territory in 1972. A Peace Accord was signed between central government and insurgent groups of Mizoram on 30 June 1986. Per the accord, insurgents surrendered their arms and Mizoram became the 23rd state of India in 1986, formalised the following year. The first election of Mizoram Legislative Assembly was held on 16 February 1987. Elections have been held at 5-year intervals since then. Elections were held for 40 seats of legislative assembly in 2023, ZPM won the elections.

V. K. Singh is the governor of Mizoram since December 2024.

== Administration ==
District	Population (2011)	Population Density per km^{2}
Aizawl	400,309	117
Lunglei	161,428	35
Champhai	125,745	37
Lawngtlai	117,894	39
Mamit	86,364	29
Kolasib	83,955	56
Serchhip	64,937	47
Saiha	56,574	52
Khawzawl	36,381	36
Hnathial	28,468	27
Saitual	11,619	

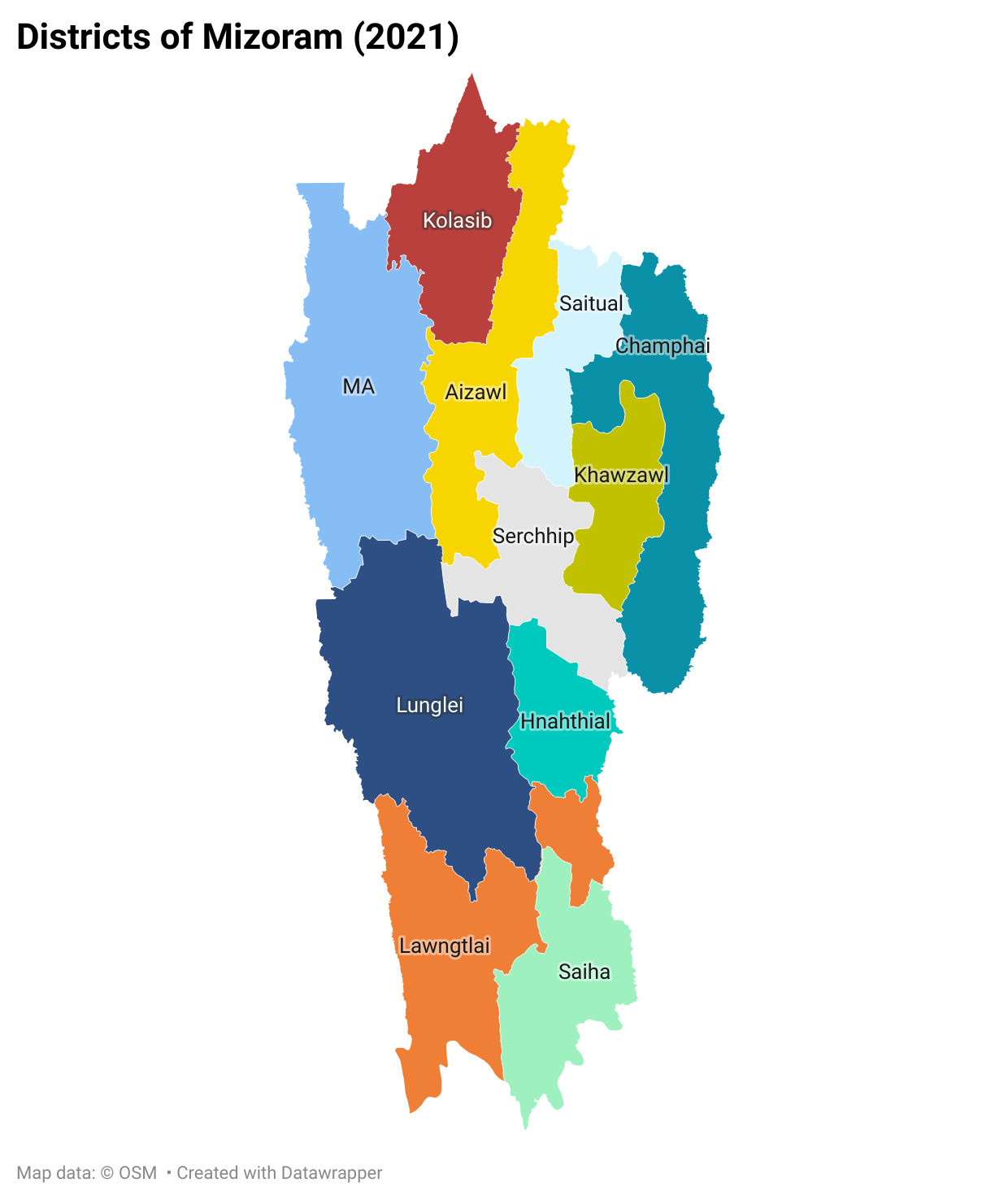
Districts of Mizoram (2021)

The Mizoram State Legislative Assembly has 40 seats and the Village Councils are the grassroots of democracy and leadership in Mizoram. The state has a chief minister, council of ministers with a portfolio of ministries responsible for different priorities and role of the government.

There are eleven districts in Mizoram. A district of Mizoram is headed by a Deputy Commissioner who is in charge of the administration in that particular district. The Deputy Commissioner is the executive head of the district, responsible for implementing government regulations, the law and order situation in the district, as well as being responsible for tax collection for the government.

A Superintendent of Police is responsible for the police administration of each district.

The Capital city of Aizawl is managed by Aizawl Municipal Corporation and the Lunglei town is managed by Lunglei Municipal Council.

The state has 3 autonomous district councils for ethnic minorities- Chakma Autonomous District Council, Lai Autonomous District Council and Mara Autonomous District Council. Additionally, the local body Sinlung Hills Council was formed for Hmar minority.

== Economy ==
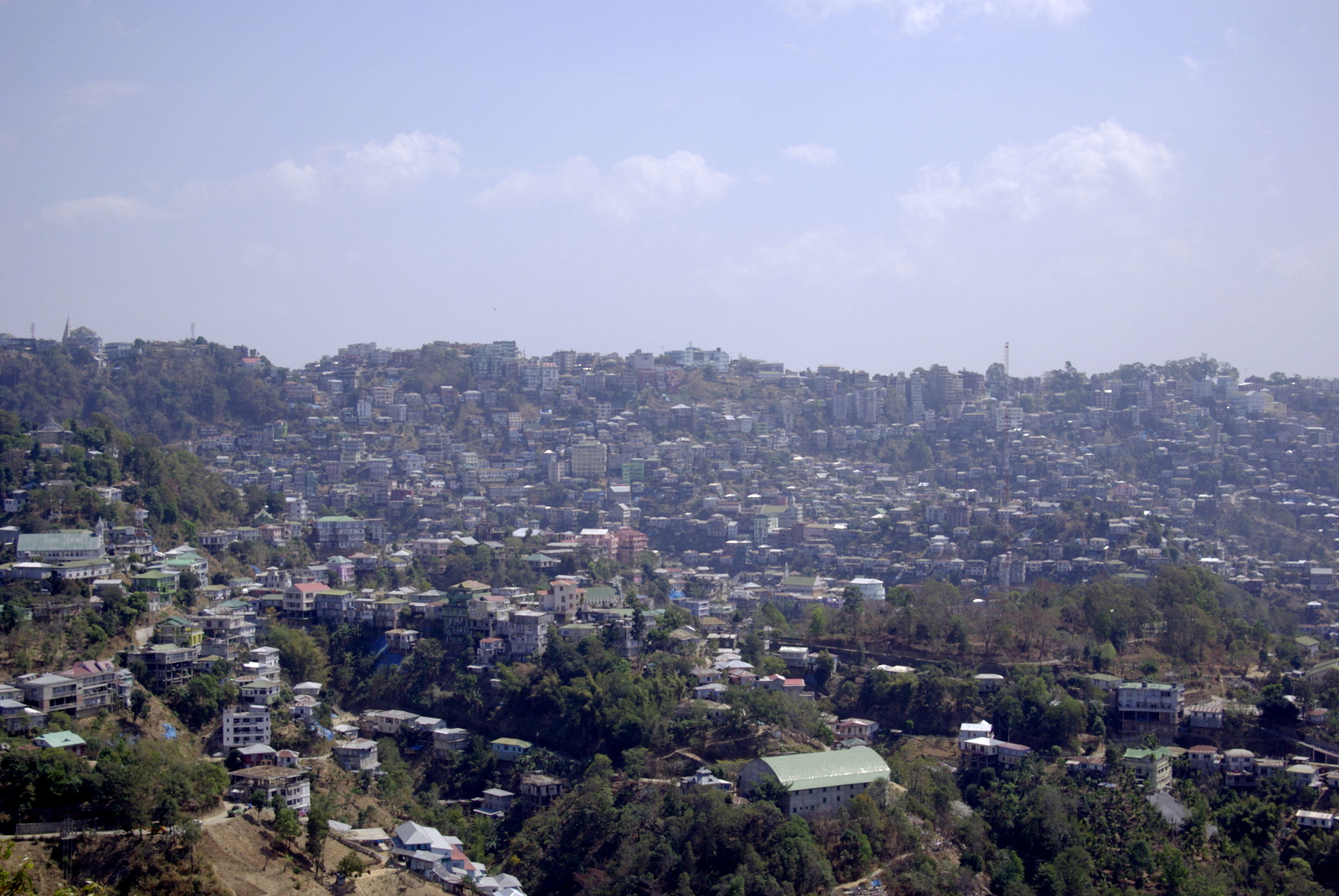
Aizawl, the capital city of Mizoram

Mizoram gross state domestic product (GSDP) in 2011–2012 was about ₹69.91 billion (US$750 million). The state's gross state domestic product (GSDP) growth rate was nearly 10% annually over 2001–2013 period. As of 2019, the states's provisional GSDP was expected to be ₹251.4857 billion (US$2.7 billion). With international borders with Bangladesh and Myanmar, it is an important trade state for southeast Asian imports to India, as well as exports from India.

The biggest contributors to state's GSDP growth are agriculture, public administration, and construction work. Tertiary sector of service sector continued to have the contribution to the GSDP with its share hovering between 58% and 60% during the past decade.

As of 2013, according to the Reserve Bank of India, 20.4% of the state population is below poverty line, about the same as the 21.9% average for India. Rural poverty is significantly higher in Mizoram, with 35.4% below the poverty line compared to India's rural poverty average of 25.7; while in urban areas of Mizoram, 6.4% are below the poverty line.

Mizoram has a highly literate work force, with literacy rate of nearly 90% and widespread use of English. The state has a total of 4,300 kilometres of roads of which 927 kilometres are high quality national highways and 700 kilometres of state highways. The state is developing its Kolodyne River (Chhimtuipui lui) for navigation and international trade. Mizoram's airport is at the capital city of Aizawl. The state is a power deficit state, with plans to develop its hydroelectric potential. After agriculture, the major employer of its people include handloom and horticulture industries. Tourism is a growth industry. In 2008, the state had nearly 7,000 registered companies. The state government has been implementing special economic zones (SEZs) to encourage economic growth.

=== Agriculture ===
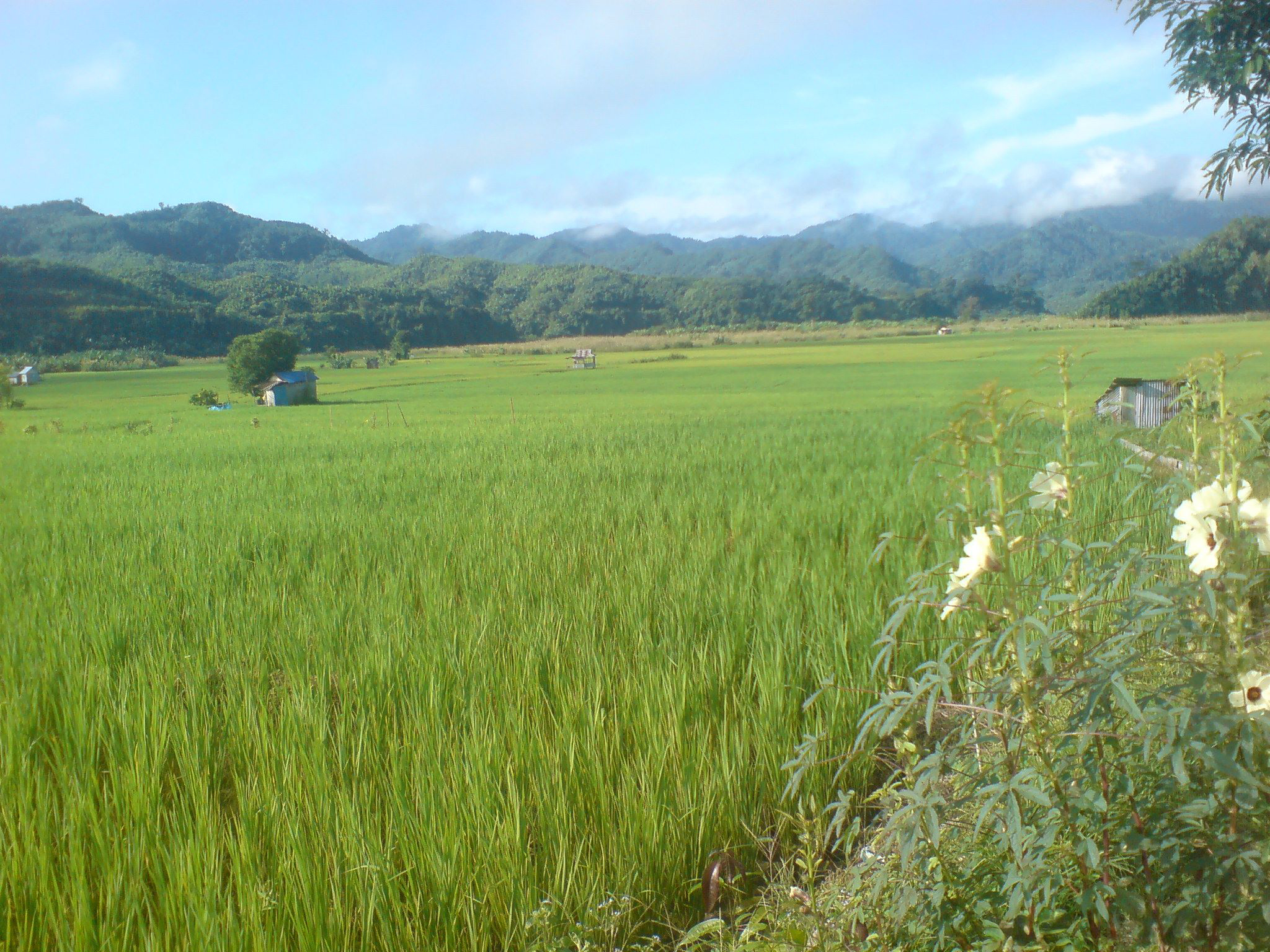
A paddy field in Zawlpui, Serchhip

Between 55% and 60% of the working population of the state is annually deployed on agriculture. The sector's contribution to the gross state domestic product was 30% in 1994, just 14% in 2009 due to economic growth of other sectors.

Agriculture has traditionally been a subsistence profession in Mizoram. It is seen as a means for generate food for one's family, ignoring its potential for commerce, growth and prosperity. Rice remains the largest crop grown in Mizoram by gross value of output. Fruits have grown to become the second largest category, followed by condiments and spices.

Jhum practice

Before 1947, agriculture in Mizoram predominantly used to be slash-and-burn driven Jhum cultivation. This was discouraged by the state government, and the practice has been slowly declining. A 2012 report estimates the proportion of shifting cultivation area in Mizoram to be about 30% – predominant part of which was for rice production (56% to 63% depending on the year). Despite dedicating largest amount of labour, jhum cultivated and non-jhum crop area to rice, the yields are low; Mizoram average rice yields per acre is about 70% of India's average rice yield per acre and 32% of India's best yield. Mizoram produces about 26% of rice it consumes every year, and it buys the deficit from other states of India.

The crop area used for jhum cultivation rotates in Mizoram; that is, the area slashed and burnt for a crop is abandoned for a few years and then jhumias return to slash and burn the same plot after a few years of non-use. The primary reasons for cyclical jhum cultivation includes, according to Goswami et al.

Horticulture

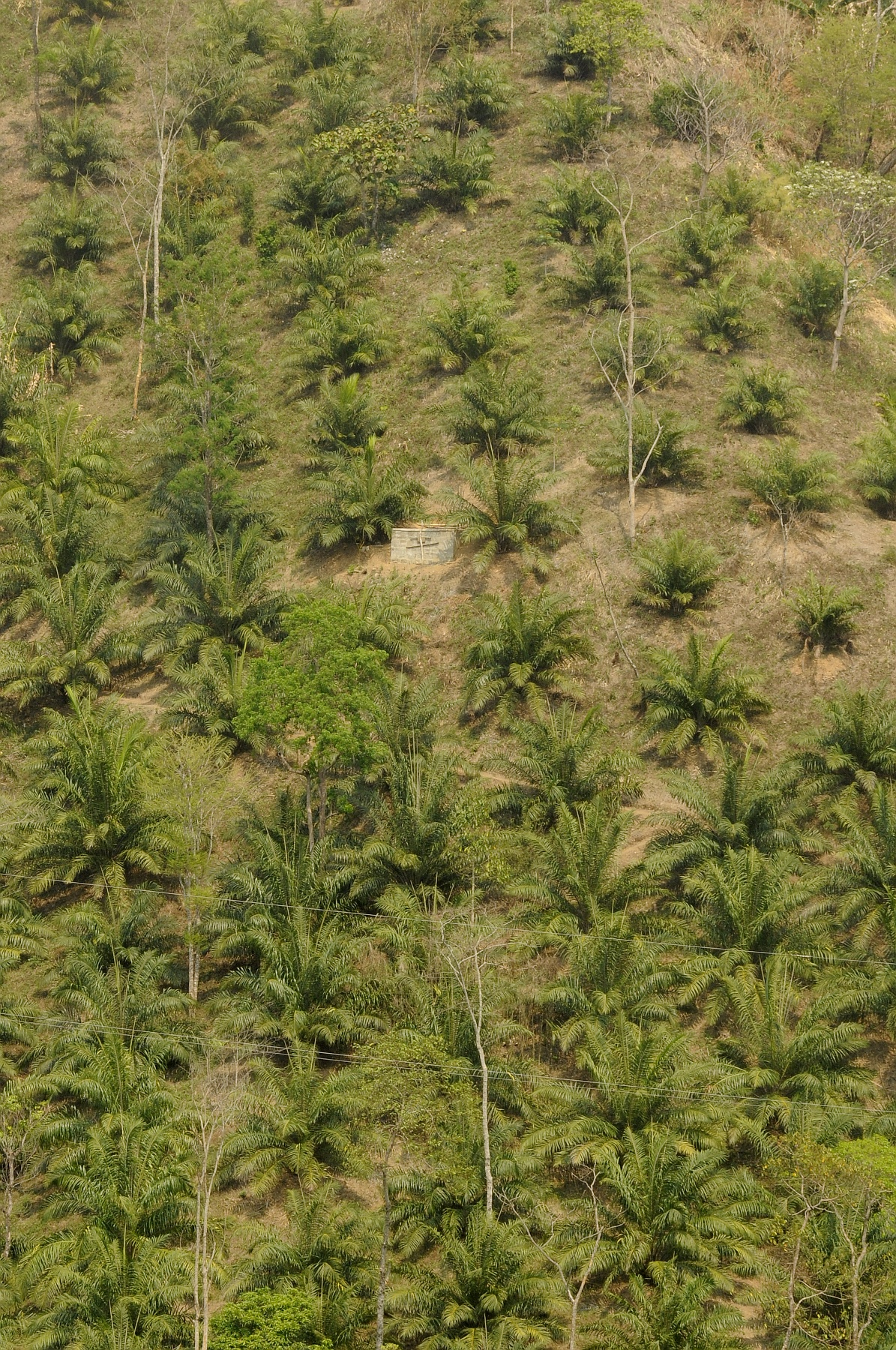
Oil palm in Mamit

In horticulture and floriculture, Mizoram is a significant producer and global exporter of Anthurium (over 7 million a year) and roses. It is also a significant producer and domestic supplier of banana, ginger, turmeric, passion fruit, orange and chowchow. Mizoram has accomplished this horticulture success and exports in 2009, with just 6% of its cultivated land dedicated to horticulture and floriculture, indicating a large potential for further growth and economic integration with other Indian states as well export driven economy. In 2013, the area dedicated to horticulture and floriculture increased to 9.4% of 1.2 million hectares potential.

The agricultural productivity is very low in Mizoram. The state gets a lot of rain, but its soil is porous and irrigation infrastructure very inadequate; this has affected it crop yield and reliability. The yield issue that can be addressed by building irrigation infrastructure and adoption of better crop technologies. The state also has very low consumption of fertiliser and pesticides, which scholars suggest offers an opportunity for organic farming particularly of vegetables and fruits.

=== Forestry, fisheries and sericulture ===
Mizoram is one of the leading producers of bamboo in India, has 27 species of bamboo, and supplies 14% of India's commercial bamboo. Forest products contribute about 5% to the state's gross product. The state produces about 5,200 metric tonnes of fish a year, about 12% of potential that can be sustainably achieved. Sericulture is an important handicraft industry engaged by nearly 8,000 families in over 300 Mizo villages.

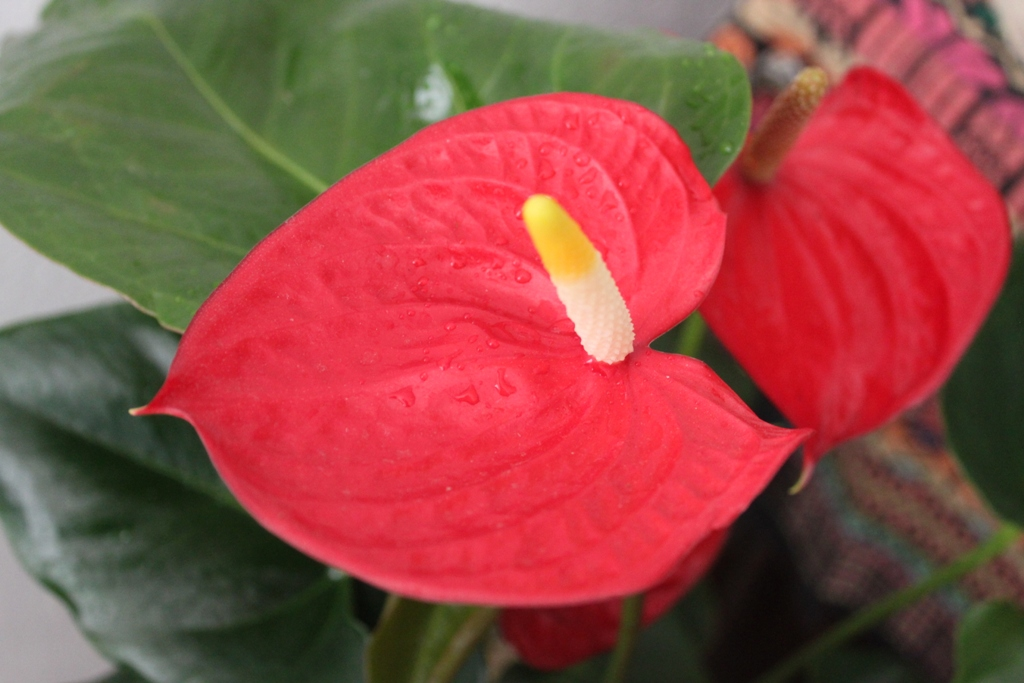
Mizoram produces over 7 million tonnes of Anthurium (shown), supplying the domestic market as well as exporting it to UAE, UK and Japan. The majority of producers and income earners from this business are Mizoram women.

=== Industry ===
Mizoram has two industrial estates at Zuangtui and Kolasib. Another software technology park is being established in Mizoram University campus. The state government has acquired 127 acres of land in Khawnuam for development of the Indo-Myanmar border trade township.

=== Energy infrastructure ===
Mizoram is not self-sufficient in power. In 2012, the state had a demand for 107 MW of power, but had an effective installed capacity of only 29.35 MW. To bridge the gap, it purchased electricity from the national grid.

The hydroelectric power potential of Mizoram was assessed to be about 3600 MW in 2010, and about 4500 MW in 2012. If even half of this is realised, the state could supply all its citizens and industry with 24/7 electricity, as well as earn income by selling surplus power to the national grid. The topography of Mizoram hydroelectric resources is ideal for power projects. The following rivers are suited for hydel projects with minimal impact on its biosphere – Tuivai, Tuivawl, Tlawng, Tut, Serlui, Tuirial, Kolodyne, Tuichang, Tuipui, Tiau and Mat. Beyond the major rivers, Mizoram has many small but perennial streams and rivulets with ideal condition for developing micro/mini and small hydroelectric projects. The state has proposed projects to attract private investments on Build, Own, Operate and Transfer (BOOT) basis with financial assistance in rehabilitating its citizens were they to be affected by the project. The largest proposed project is expected to be on Kolodyne (460 MW), and there are dozens of small to micro projects that have been identified.

The main energy infrastructures in Mizoram are:

- Tuirial Dam 60 MW.
- Serlui B Dam 12 MW.
- Vankal Solar Park 20 MW.

== Transport infrastructure ==
- Road network: In 2012, Mizoram had a road network of around 8,500 kilometres (5,300 mi) including unsurfaced village roads to surfaced national highways; and there were 106,000 registered motor vehicles. The village roads are primarily single lane or unmetalled tracks that are typically lightly trafficked. Mizoram had 871 kilometres of national highways, 1,663 kilometres of state highways and 2,320 kilometres of surfaced district roads. All of Mizoram's 23 urban centres and 59% of its 764 villages are connected by all weather roads. However, landslide and weather damage to these roads is significant in parts.

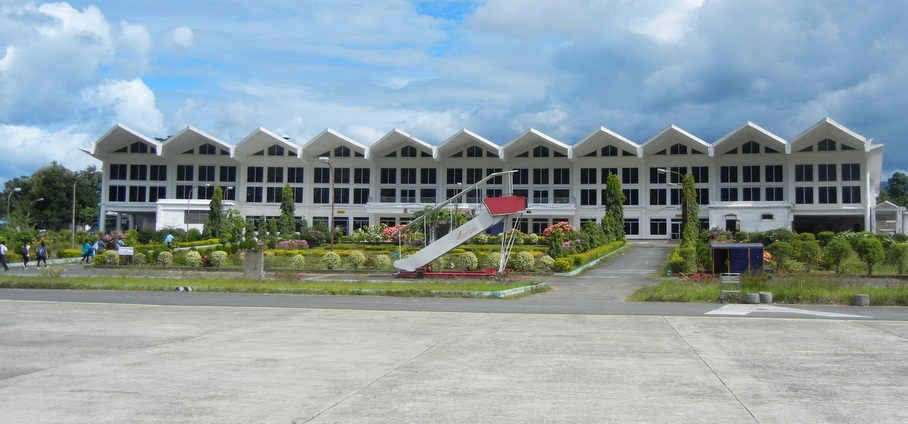
Lengpui Airport Building

- Airport: Mizoram has an airport, Lengpui Airport (IATA: AJL), near Aizawl and its runway is 3,130 feet long at an elevation of 1,000 feet.
- Helicopter: A Helicopter service by Pawan Hans has been started which connects the Aizawl with Lunglei, Lawngtlai, Saiha, Chawngte, Serchhip, Champhai, Kolasib, Khawzawl, Mamit and Hnahthial.
- Water ways: Mizoram is in the process of developing water ways with the port of Akyab Sittwe in Burma along its biggest river, Chhimtuipui. It drains into Burma's Rakhine state, and finally enters the Bay of Bengal at Akyab, which is a popular port in Sittwe, Burma. The Indian government considers it a priority to set up inland water ways along this river to trade with Burma. The project is known as the Kaladan Multi-modal Transit Transport Project. India is investing $103 million to develop the Sittwe port on Burma's northern coast, about 160 kilometres (99 mi) from Mizoram. State Peace and Development Council of Burma has committed $10 million for the venture. The project is expected to be complete in 2015, and consists of two parts. First, river Kaladan (or Kolodyne, Chhimtuipui) is being dredged and widened from the port at Sittwe to Paletwa, in Chin province, adjacent to Mizoram. This 160 km inland waterway will enable cargo ships to enter, upload and offload freight in Paletwa, Myanmar; this is expected to be complete in 2014. As second part of the project, being constructed in parallel, includes a 62 km two-lane highway from Paletwa (also known as Kaletwa or Setpyitpyin) to Lomasu, Mizoram. Additionally, an all weather multilane 100 km road from Lomasu to Lawngtlai in Mizoram is being built to connect it with the Indian National Highway 54. This part of the project is slated to be complete by 2015. Once complete, this project is expected to economically benefit trade and horticulture exports of Mizoram, as well as improve economic access to 60 million people of landlocked northeast India and Myanmar.

== Education ==
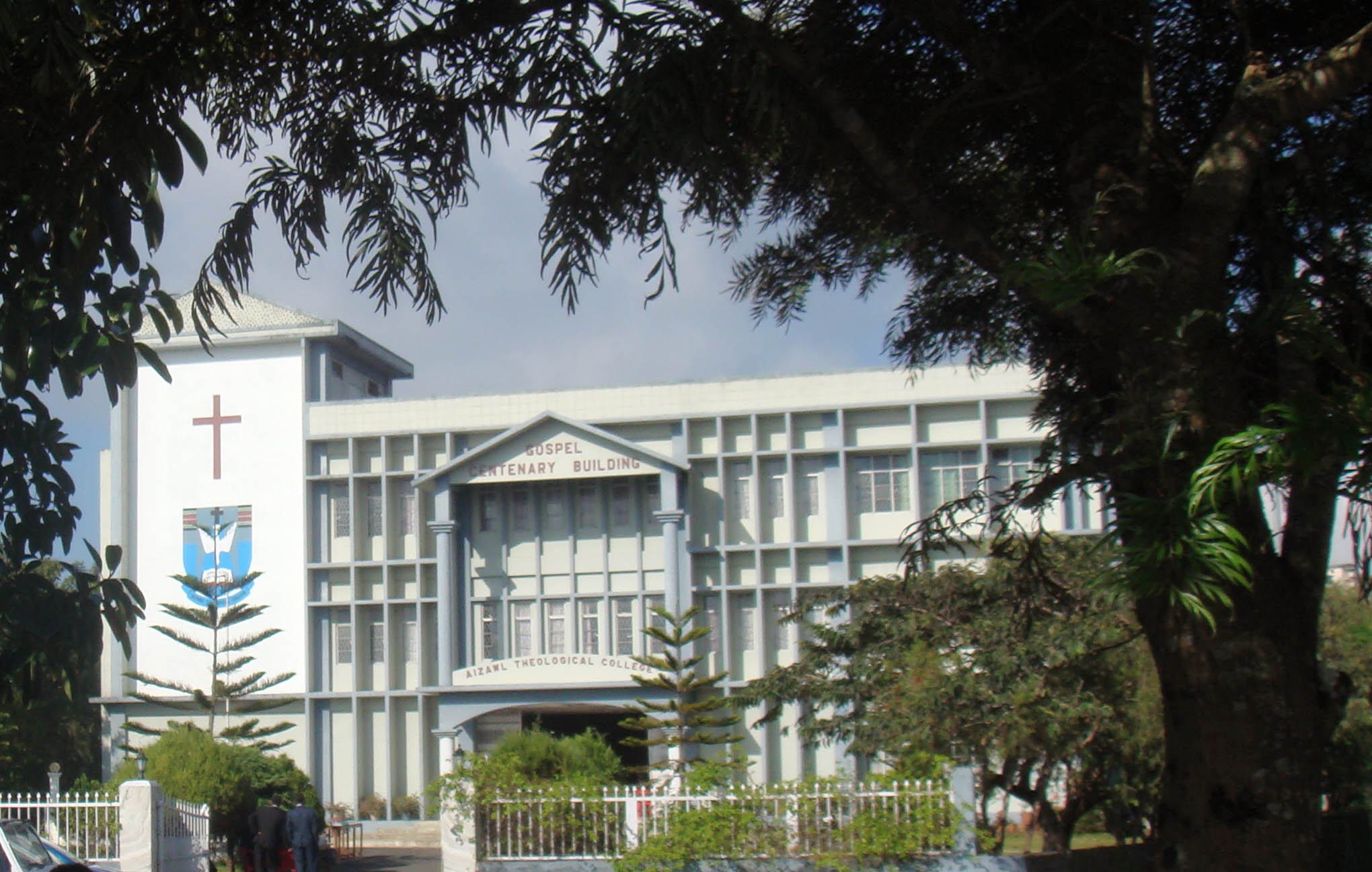
Aizawl Theological College

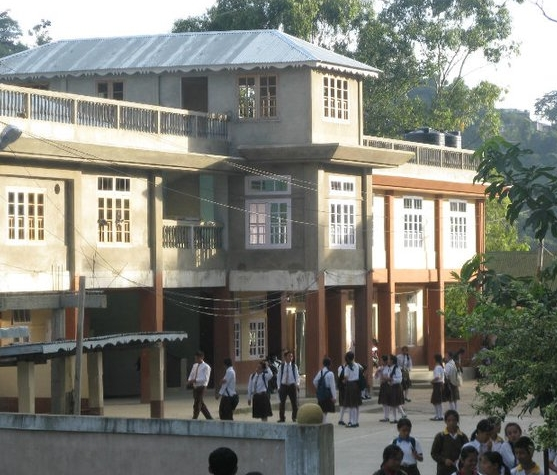
A school campus in Mizoram

The first primary school was set up in 1898 at Aijal by Christian missionaries. The state has long enjoyed higher literacy rates than average literacy rates for India. In 1961, the literacy was 51%. By 2011 census, it had reached 92%, compared to 74% average for India. Mizoram is second only to Kerala.

There were 3,894 schools in Mizoram as of 2012. Of these, 42% are publicly owned and managed by Central/State governments, 28% are private without government subsidies, 21% are private with government subsidies, and the rest are primary and middle schools that are government-financed by run by three Autonomous District Councils of Mizoram. The teacher-pupil ratio is about 1:20 for primary, 1:9 for middle School, 1:13 for high, and 1:15 for higher secondary schools.

There are several educational establishments under the umbrella of the Ministry of Education, including universities, colleges, and other institutions. Within Mizoram University, there are 29 undergraduate departments including two professional institutions affiliated with the university. The state had 22 other colleges, and the total college enrolment was approximately 10,600 students in 2012. Other well known institutes are National Institute of Technology Mizoram, ICFAI University, Mizoram, College of Veterinary Sciences & Animal Husbandry, Selesih, Aizawl, Mizoram and Regional Institute of Paramedical and Nursing Aizawl.

== Culture ==
The growth of Christianity, scholars state, was shaped from a foundation of cultural, religious and socio-political structure.

A consequence of Hnatlang was the culture of Tlâwmngaihna, which does not have a direct English translation. Tlâwmngaihna as cultural concept incorporates behaviour that is self-sacrificing, self-denying, doing what an occasion demands unselfishly and without concern for inconvenience caused, persevering, stoical, stout-hearted, plucky, brave, firm, independent, loath to lose one's good reputation.

Several other cultural elements of ancient Mizo tribes, some of which became less prevalent after arrival of Christianity, included:

- Zawlbuk: a place near the chief's home, which served as defence camp in times of war, as well as "bachelor house" where the youth gathered and centre of village life.
- Pathian: the term for god, to whom prayers and hymns were recited. The evil spirits were called ramhuai.
- Nula-rim: the method of courtship in ancient culture. Courtship, pre-marital sex and polygamy were accepted. The man and the woman could have many partners. If the woman got pregnant, the man was required either marry or pay a substantial sum called sawnman. If the woman's parents discover the relationship, they had a right to demand a payment called khumpuikaiman. While pre-marital sex was accepted, a woman who was virgin at marriage was more highly esteemed than one who was not.
- Pathlawi: a divorced man.
- Ramri lehkha: a boundary drawing that identified a chief's tenured land called ram. Only the chief owned the land, and this ownership was hereditary. The tribe and village worked and harvested the land.

=== Traditional festivals ===
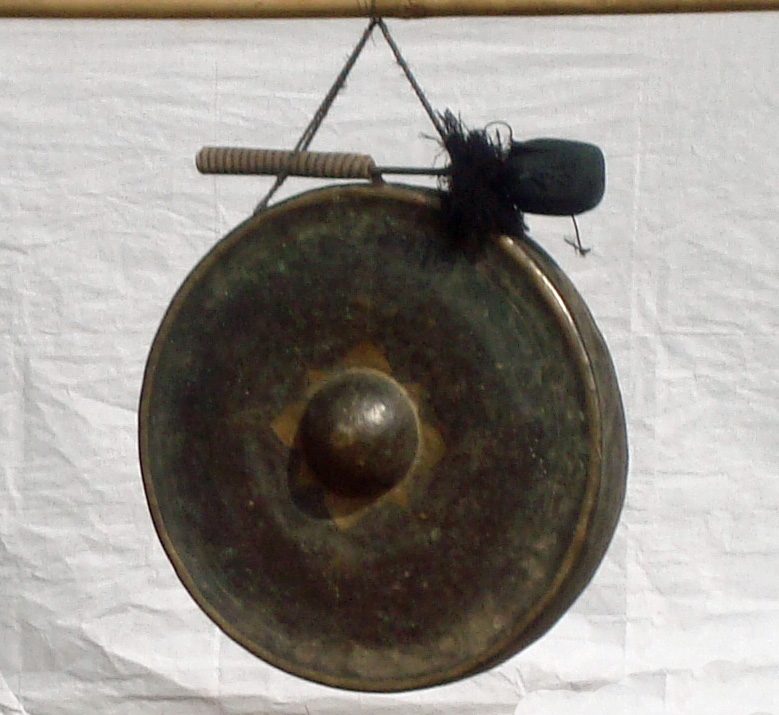
Darkhuang, Zamluang or jamluang – a traditional musical instrument found in Mizoram.Other instruments include khuang (drum), dar (cymbals), as well as bamboo-based phenglawng, tuium and tawtawrawt.

Traditional festivals in Mizoram often revolved around stages of jhum cultivation or the seasons. Community festivals were called kut in the local language, and there were major and minor kuts such as Chapchar Kut, Thalfavang Kut, Mim Kut and Pawl Kut. Chapchar Kut was the festival of spring (February/March), just before jhum started and land was cut-and-burnt for a new crop. Chapchar Kut was most anticipated by youth, a major festival and involved dancing and feasts. Thalfavang Kut celebrated completion of weeding of the jhum crop fields.

Chapchar Kut was reintroduced and revived in 1973 by Mizo people to celebrate their heritage. Before Christianity arrived in Mizoram, home-brewed alcohol and many meat delicacies were part of the Chapchar celebrations. Now, with Mizoram's state law as a dry state, the youth busy themselves with music and community dancing. Along with reviving traditional festivals, the community has been reviving the traditional dances at these festivals, for example, dances such as Cheraw, Khuallam, Chheihlam and Chai.

== Performing arts ==
Chapchar Kut cheraw dance in Mizoram. Chapchar Kut festival is celebrated during March after completion of their most arduous task of Jhum operation i.e., jungle-clearing (clearing of the remnants of burning).

Mizoram has many traditional dances, such as:

- Cheraw – a dance that involves men holding bamboo close to the floor. They tap the sticks open and close with the rhythm of the music. Women in colourful dresses dance on top, stepping in between and out of the bamboo with the music. It requires coordination and skill.
- Khual Lam – a mixed-gender dance that traditionally celebrated successfully hunting with swaying cloth with singing and music.

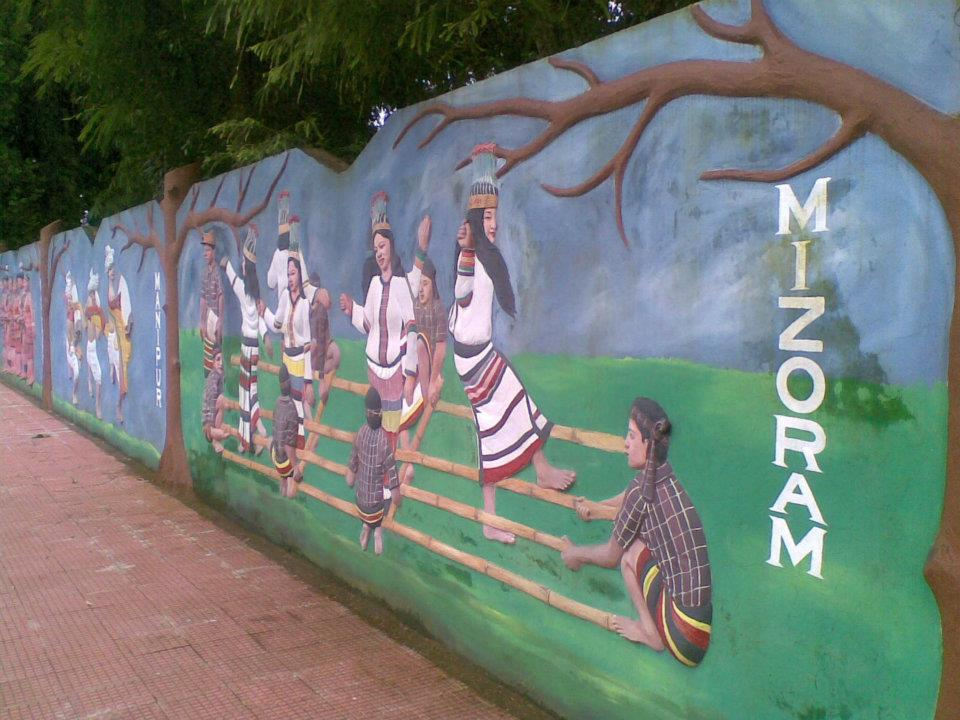
Dance of Mizoram

- Chheih Lam – typically performed over cool evenings with rice beer, people sit in a circle with two or more dancers in the centre; they sing with impromptu often humorous compositions about recent events or guests between them with music and dancers keeping up. The song was called Chheih Hla. Mizo people have tried to introduce the Chheih Lam during church sermons with controversy.
- Chai Lam – an important dance at the Chapchar Kut, this places the musicians in the centre while men and women in colourful dresses alternate and form a circle; the women held the men at their waist, while men held the women at their shoulders; they step forward to move in circles while swaying left and right with the music. A song may be sung which is also called Chai.

=== Sports ===
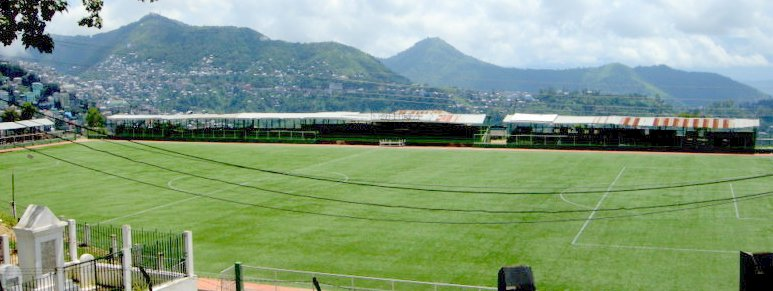
Lammual Stadium

Mizoram's first football league debuted in October 2012. The Mizoram Premiere League had eight teams during the 2012–2013 season and is the highest level league in Mizoram. The eight clubs include Aizawl, Chanmari, Dinthar, FC Kulikawn, Luangmual, Mizoram, RS Annexe, and Reitlang. The season starts each year in October and wraps up with the finals in March. Aizawl FC is an Indian professional football club that competes in the I-League, the second tier of Indian football league system.

== Tourism ==
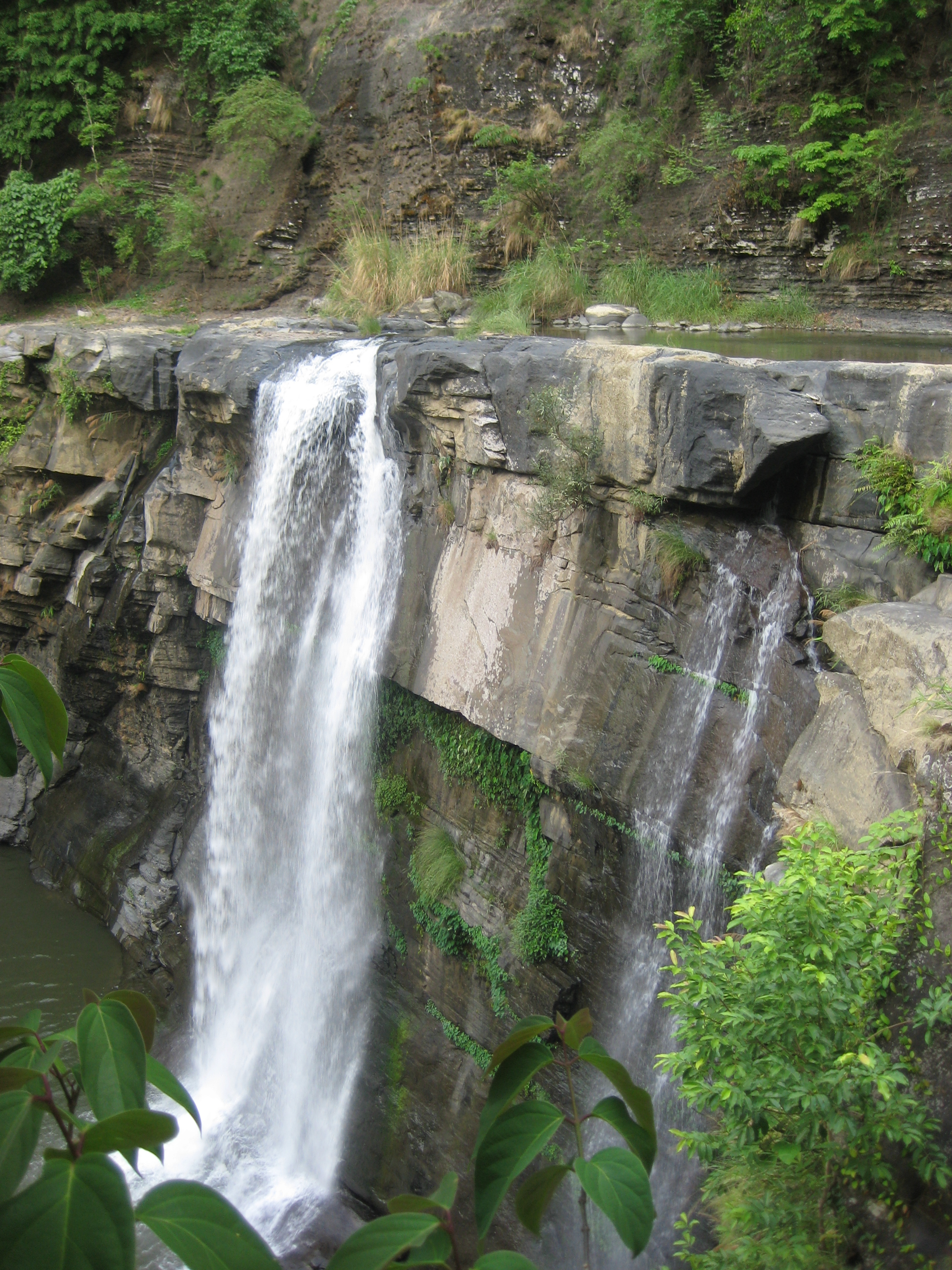
Kawpi Waterfall

=== Domestic tourists ===
The state requires Indian citizens to have an Inner Line Permit. This is available from the Liaison officer, government of Mizoram in Kolkata, Silchar, Shillong, Guwahati and New Delhi. Those arriving by air can obtain a 15-day visit pass at Lengpui airport, Aizawl by submitting photographs and paying the fee of ₹120 (US$1.30).

=== International tourists ===
Almost all foreign nationals can get the required Protected Area Permit on arrival, and face the same requirements as domestic tourists. However, they additionally have to register themselves with state police within 24 hours of arrival, a formality that most resorts can provide. Citizens of Afghanistan, China and Pakistan and foreign nationals having their origin in these countries are required to get the pass through the Indian consulate or from the Ministry of Home Affairs in New Delhi, before they arrive in Mizoram.

=== Attractions ===
Mizoram is a place with flora and fauna rich landscape and pleasant climate.

The state is a bird watcher's destination. For Mrs. Hume's pheasant (Syrmaticus humiae), Mizoram is a stronghold. Wild water buffalo, Sumatran rhinoceros, elephants and other mammals have been spotted in the past.

== Issues ==
=== Chakmaland ===
Having an estimated population of more than 100,000 per 2011 Indian census, the Chakmas have been demanding to convert the existing Chakma Autonomous District Council in Mizoram into a Union territory.

=== Alcohol prohibition ===
In 1996, the government of Mizoram banned liquor. The church leaders (Mizoram Kohhran Hruaitute Committee) argue that state government should keep the ban and not seek to amend the law, while others argue prohibition should be lifted. However, it has been difficult to enforce the ban due to the high demand for alcohol.

In 2008, the Mizoram Excise and Narcotics (Wine) Rules amended the ban of 1996 to allow the manufacture, export, sale, possession and consumption of wine in Mizoram made from grapes and guava which would help the economy of the state, reduce fruit waste from farms, and encourage large scale commercialisation. In 2011 the bill was amended to include apple, ginger, passion fruit, peach and pear wine.

In 2013, the state assembly unanimously passed a resolution to study the impact of liquor prohibition. In 2014, the state's narcotics minister noted that the liquor ban had produced some serious problems in Mizo society due to the drinking of spurious and unhealthy (locally made) liquor, known as zu. The government suggested it would introduce an amended liquor bill allowing retail shops to operate in Aizawl and other district headquarters to sell liquor – but not in bars. Furthermore, they would not consult the powerful church on the issue.

The Mizoram Liquor Prohibition and Control bill of 2014 was repealed on 20 March 2019 with the Mizoram Liquor Prohibition Bill 2019, it was a legislation promised by the Mizo National Front.

=== Rat problems ===
Every 50 years, the Mautam bamboo blooms and its high-protein seeds lead to an explosion in the black rat population in the jungle, also referred to as the rat flood, which has historically destroyed entire villages' food supplies after rats move on to farm fields and devour crops. The 1958–59 plague provoked a rural uprising during which the indigenous Mizo people launched a violent 20-year rebellion against the central government. The dispute only saw final resolution in 1986. The 48-year rat problem recurred in Mizoram in 2006–08. The crops suffered massive damage, with yields at 30-year lows; the crop yields recovered sharply to pre-mautam levels in 2009 after the mautam flowering.

== Media and communication ==
See also Newspapers in Mizoram.

Mizoram's media is growing quickly. Internet access is average, and private television cable channels are popular. Doordarshan, the national television service of India provides terrestrial broadcasting services and All India Radio broadcast programmes related to the indigenous culture and local news. Broadband access is available. In addition to these, there are several websites in local dialects. Print journalism remains a popular news medium in Mizoram; local newspapers include Vanglaini and Zalen. The Mizoram Post, an English-language daily newspaper published from Silchar (Assam) was the most circulated newspaper in Mizoram, in 2007.

== Notable people ==
- C. Rokhuma - Mizo scientist and founder of the Anti-Famine Campaign Organisation.
- Chuauṭhuama - Mizo Presbyterian minister, biblical scholar and theologian.
- Darchhawna – Mizo author of Hindi literature.
- James Dokhuma – Mizo academic, writer, and former insurgent.
- Jeje Lalpekhlua – Mizo footballer. Player at the Indian Super League (ISL) and Hero I-League. Former Captain of the India national football team.
- Jeremy Lalrinnunga – Mizo weightlifter who win Gold in International Weightlifting event.
- Jerry Mawihmingthanga – Mizo footballer who plays as a midfielder or winger for Odisha in the Indian Super League.
- Laldenga (d.1990) – Mizo separatist, former party leader of the Mizo National Front (MNF) and 4th Chief Minister of Mizoram.
- Lalduhoma – politician and party leader of the Zoram People's Movement (ZPM). Former Member of Parliament (Lok Sabha) for Mizoram. 6th and current Chief Minister of Mizoram. Also served as secret service for Indira Gandhi and Indian Police Service [IPS].
- Lallianzuala Chhangte – Mizo footballer who plays as a midfielder or winger for Mumbai in the Indian Super League.
- Lalremsiami – hockey player representing India in several International Hockey Events.
- Lalrindika Ralte – Mizo Footballer. Player at the Indian Super League (ISL) and Hero I-League. Currently the captain of East Bengal F.C.
- Lalsangzuali Sailo (d.2006)- a singer, songwriter, poet, All India Radio "A" grade artist and a recipient of Padma Shree Award.
- Lalsawma – Indian social worker, missionary and peace negotiator during the Mizo unrest.
- Lal Thanhawla – former Chief Minister of Mizoram and leader of the Mizoram Congress Party.
- Nuchhungi Renthlei (d.2002) – founder of Girls' Auxiliary, a poet, a singer and a school teacher, the first Mizo woman to receive the Padma Shri award
- Robert Lalthlamuana – Mizo footballer. Player at the Indian Super League (ISL) and Hero I-League.
- Sangthankima – Mizo social worker and humanitarian. Founder of Thutak Nunpuitu Team.
- Shylo Malsawmtluanga – Mizo footballer. Former player at the Hero I-League. Current player of the Mizoram Premier League (MPL).
- Ziona (d.2021) – a polygamous man with 38 wives and numerous children and grandchildren. His family holds the record for the World's Largest Family.
- Zoramthanga – former Chief Minister of Mizoram and current party leader of the Mizo National Front (MNF).*

=== Chiefs ===
- Lallula (d.1807) – Established the Sailo dynasty in the Lushai Hills.
- Lalsavunga – Founded the original site of Aizawl.
- Khalkam (d.1891) – Son of Sukpilal, organiser of the Western Lushai Rising.
- Lalbura (1843–1933) – Son of Vanhnuailiana, organiser of the Eastern Lushai Rising
- Mângpawrha – Son of Lallula, consolidated Sailo rule in the western Lushai Hills.
- Pâwibâwia (1852–1892) – Anti-British chief during Lushai Expedition and Lushai Rising.
- Sibuta – Infamous chief and patron of the Sibuta Lung.
- Suakpuilala (d.1881) – First and only chief to sign a sunnad with the British under Sir John Ware Edgar.
- Ropuiliani (d.1895) – Mizo chieftainess who fiercely resisted British colonial rule.
- Rothangpuia – Friendly chief and ally of Thomas Herbert Lewin who participated in the Lushai Expedition together.
- Vanhnuailiana (d.1871) – Famous Eastern Mizo chief.
- Laltheri – Mizo princess and poet, known as a figure of a love tragedy.
- Zakapa (d.1914) – Organiser of the Southern Lushai Rising, his actions and legacy led to the creation of the Zakapa award for women's achievements.

=== Pasalṭha (warriors) ===
- Khuangchera (d.1890) – Mizo Pasalṭha and (declared) Indian freedom fighter.
- Taitesena (d.1904) – Mizo Pasalṭha known for volunteering and hunting.
- Saizahawla (b.1858) – Mizo Pasalṭha known for wrestling and athleticism.
- Chawngbawla – Mizo Pasalṭha known for fighting in the North-South War of the Lushai Hills
- Zampuimanga – Mizo Pasalṭha known for serving Lalsavunga and hunting tigers.
- Vana Pa – Mizo Pasalṭha known as a tactician and counsellor. Vanapa Hall has been named in his honour.

== See also ==
- Outline of India
- Bibliography of India
- Mizo Hlakungpui Mual
- Mizo music
- Insurgency in Northeast India
- 1997 ethnic violence and displacement of Bru-Reang
