= Outline of Mizoram =

Overview of and topical guide to Mizoram

Location of Mizoram

The following outline is provided as an overview of and topical guide to Mizoram:

Mizoram – one of the states of Northeast India, with Aizawl as its capital city. The name is derived from Mi (people), Zo (Belonging to the people of Mizoram/Lushai Hills) and Ram (land), and thus Mizoram implies "land of the hill people". In the northeast, it is the southernmost landlocked state sharing borders with three of the Seven Sister States, namely Tripura, Assam, Manipur.

Seal of Mizoram

== General reference ==
=== Names ===
- Common English name: Mizoram
  - Pronunciation: English: /mɪˈzɔːrəm/
- Official English name(s): Mizoram
- Nickname(s):
- Adjectival(s): Mizo
- Demonym(s): Mizos

=== Rankings (amongst India's states) ===
- by population: 28th
- by area (2011 census): 25th
- by crime rate (2015): 13th
- by gross domestic product (GDP) (2014): 28th
- by Human Development Index (HDI):
- by life expectancy at birth:
- by literacy rate: 2nd

== Geography of Mizoram ==
Geography of Mizoram

- Mizoram is: an Indian state, and one of the Seven Sister States
- Population of Mizoram: 1,091,014 (2011)
- Area of Mizoram: 21,087 km^{2} (8,142 sq mi)
- Atlas of Mizoram

=== Location of Mizoram ===
- Mizoram is situated within the following regions:
  - Northern Hemisphere
  - Eastern Hemisphere
    - Eurasia
      - Asia
        - South Asia
          - India
            - Northeastern India
              - Seven Sister States
- Time zone: Indian Standard Time (UTC+05:30)

=== Environment of Mizoram ===
==== Natural geographic features of Mizoram ====
- Highest point: Phawngpui

==== Protected areas of Mizoram ====
- Murlen National Park
- Phawngpui National Park
- Dampa Tiger Reserve

=== Regions of Mizoram ===
==== Administrative divisions of Mizoram ====
===== Districts of Mizoram =====
Districts of Mizoram

- Aizawl district
- Champhai district
- Kolasib district
- Lawngtlai district
- Lunglei district
- Mamit district
- Siaha district
- Serchhip district

===== Municipalities of Mizoram =====
- Cities of Mizoram
  - Capital of Mizoram: Aizawl
  - Bairabi
  - Biate
  - Champhai
  - Darlawn
  - Hnahthial
  - Kolasib
  - Khawhai
  - Khawzawl
  - Lawngtlai
  - Lengpui
  - Lunglei
  - Mamit
  - North Kawnpui
  - North Vanlaiphai
  - Saiha
  - Sairang
  - Saitual
  - Serchhip
  - Thenzawl
  - Tlabung
  - Vairengte
  - Zawlnuam

=== Demography of Mizoram ===
Demographics of Mizoram

== Government and politics of Mizoram ==
Politics of Mizoram

- Form of government: Indian state government (parliamentary system of representative democracy)
- Capital of Mizoram: Aizawl
- Elections in Mizoram
  - Assembly election results of Mizoram

=== Union government in Mizoram ===
- Rajya Sabha members from Mizoram
- Mizoram Pradesh Congress Committee
- Indian general election, 2009 (Mizoram)

=== Branches of the government of Mizoram ===
Government of Mizoram

==== Executive branch of the government of Mizoram ====
- Head of state: Governor of Mizoram,
  - Raj Bhavan – official residence of the Governor
- Head of government: Chief Minister of Mizoram,

==== Legislative branch of the government of Mizoram ====
Mizoram Legislative Assembly

- Assembly election results of Mizoram

==== Judicial branch of the government of Mizoram ====
- Gauhati High Court

=== Law and order in Mizoram ===
- Law enforcement in Mizoram
  - Mizoram Police

== History of Mizoram ==
History of Mizoram

=== History of Mizoram, by region ===
==== History of Mizoram, by district ====
- History of Lawngtlai district
- History of Siaha district

==== History of Mizoram, by municipality ====
- History of Champhai
- History of Lawngtlai
- History of Lunglei
- History of Saitual
- History of Serchhip
- History of Thenzawl
- History of Tlabung
- History of Zawlnuam

== Culture of Mizoram ==
Culture of Mizoram

- Architecture of Mizoram
- Languages in Mizoram
  - Mizo language
- Monuments in Mizoram
  - Monuments of National Importance in Mizoram
  - State Protected Monuments in Mizoram
- World Heritage Sites in Mizoram

=== Art in Mizoram ===
- Literature of Mizoram
  - Mizo literature
- Music of Mizoram

=== People of Mizoram ===
- Mizo people

=== Religion in Mizoram ===
Religion in Mizoram

- Christianity in Mizoram

=== Sports in Mizoram ===
Sports in Mizoram

- Cricket in Mizoram
  - Mizoram cricket team
  - Cricket Association of Mizoram
- Football in Mizoram
  - Mizoram Football Association
  - Mizoram football team
  - Mizoram Premier League

=== Symbols of Mizoram ===
Symbols of Mizoram

- State animal: Serow
- State bird: Hume's pheasant
- State flower: Vanda
- State seal: Seal of Mizoram
- State tree: Mesua ferrea

== Economy and infrastructure of Mizoram ==
Economy of Mizoram

- Tourism in Mizoram
- Transport in Mizoram
  - Lengpui Airport
  - Kaladan Multi-modal Transit Transport Project
  - Bairabi Sairang Railway
  - State highways in Mizoram
- Water supply and sanitation in Mizoram
  - Tuirial Dam
  - Serlui B Dam

== Education in Mizoram ==
Education in Mizoram

- Institutions of higher education in Mizoram
  - Mizoram University
  - National Institute of Technology Mizoram

== Health in Mizoram ==
Health in Mizoram

== See also ==
- Outline of India
- Reiek
- Vantawng Falls
- Palak Dil
- Hmuifang
- Solomon's Temple, Aizawl
- Tam Dil
