= Geography of Mizoram =

Mizoram is a land of rolling hills, valleys, rivers, and lakes in Northeast India. As many as 21 major hill ranges or peaks of different heights run through the length and breadth of the state, with plains scattered here and there. The average height of the hills to the west of the state is about 1,000 metres (3,300 feet). These gradually rise to 1,300 metres (4,300 feet) to the east. Some areas, however, have higher ranges which go up to a height of over 2,000 metres (6,600 feet).

== Landscape of Mizoram ==
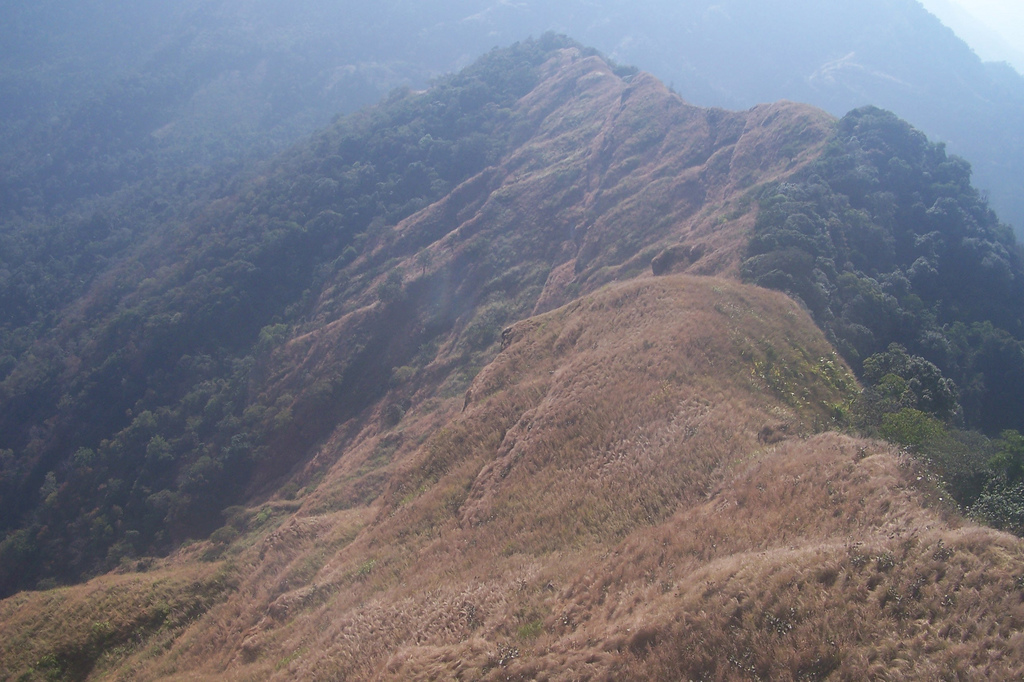
Hills of Mamit district

The folded structure of the Mizoram ranges is at the junction of two moving tectonic plates(Indian and Burmese Desi Kachar 1974). On 19 April 2011, there was a 4.3 earthquake about 10 km North of Kolasib, and a 6.4 was recorded on 4 February 2011. Mizoram is in the highest zone 5 for earthquakes.

The folded hilly or mountainous North South belts, with perpendicular faults, comprise sediments of the Surma (Middle Bhuban Formation), Barail, and Tipam groups. There is Alluvium in river beds consisting of deposits of argillaceous and arenaceous sandstones, shale, siltstones and mudstones, and greywacke. A 560m thick rock succession of the Middle Bhuban type exposed between Bawngkawn and Durtlang shows 7 normal and 7 reverse magneto strata (North and South pole reversals) showing its age to be around 20 Million years old. The rock system is generally weak, unstable, weathered, and prone to seismic and weather influence-producing landslides. The soft, black-to-grey rock is used locally for building materials and low-traffic road construction work. There are no useful minerals of economic significance apart from clays in the River Tlawng beds together with deposits of sand and gravel. Typical soils are sandy loam, and clay loam that have been heavily leached due to the high slopes leaving it porous and lacking in minerals or humus.

Several oil and gas exploration activities have taken place due to the geological condition with which Mizoram has been formed, leading to the possibilities and high expectations that reserves would be confirmed. France, Russia, and Cyprus as well as several Indian companies have already signed a 12% oil and 10% gas royalty arrangement with proceeds going directly to Mizoram state on any production (April 2009)

== Mountain Range ==
- Phawngpui Tlang also known as the Blue Mountain, situated in the south-eastern part of the state, is the highest peak in Mizoram at 2,210 metres (7,250 feet).
- Hmuifang With an elevation of 1619 metres, the mountain is still covered with virgin forests reserved since the Mizo Chief's time. Hmuifang is the way to Lunglei.
- Reiek with an elevation of 1548 metres, overlooking Aizawl and offers view of the surrounding valleys and hills, on a clear day the plains of Bangladesh can be seen from the top of the hill. Reiek Hill is surrounded by thick lush green temperate trees and bushes.
- Lengteng with an elevation of 2141
- Mawma with an elevation of 2050 metres
- Surtlang with an elevation of 1967
- Lurhtlang with an elevation of 1935
- Tan Tlang with an elevation of 1837
- V.Partlang with an elevation of 1929
- Chalhfilh Tlang with an elevation of 1865
- Hrangturzotlang with an elevation of 1854
- Zopui Tlang with an elevation of 1850
- Tawizo with an elevation of 1837
- Mawmrang with an elevation of 1812
- Purun Tlang with an elevation of 1756
- Saireptlang with an elevation of 1555
- Sakawrhmutuai tlang with an elevation of 1535
- Thorang Tlang with an elevation of 1387.2
- Durtlang with an elevation of 1384
- Buia Hmun Tlang with an elevation of 1383
- Laipui Tlang with an elevation of 1188
- South Hlimen Tlang (Lalsavunga Park) with an elevation of 1179
- Serkawn with an elevation of 1222

== Rivers ==
- Chimtuipui River, also known as Kaladan originates in Chin State in Burma and passes through Saiha and Lawngtlai district in the Southern tip of Mizoram
- Tlawng is a river of Mizoram, also known as river Dhaleswari in Assam, and joins Barak river Tributaries include the Tut, Teirei and the Ngashih. Aizawl lies in the Tlawng valley.
- Tut is a river of Mizoram, northeastern India. It is a tributary of the Tlawng River.
- Tuirial is a river of Mizoram, northeastern India. It flows in a northerly direction. It is impounded by the Tuirial Dam.
- Tuivawl flows through the northern territory and eventually join the Barak River in Cachar District.
- Tiau is a 159 km long river which forms an international boundary river between India and Myanmar.
- Khawthlangtuipui River (R.Karnaphuli) with length of 128.08 represent the drainage system of the whole south-western part of Mizoram.
- Tuichang with length of 120.75
- Tuichawng with length of 107.87
- Mat River, Mizoram with length of 90.16
- Tuipui with length of 86.94
- Teirei with length of 70.84
- Tuirini river is 54.5 kilometres (33.9 mi) long. It originates from Hmangkawn Village in Aizawl District. It flows northward to join the Tuirial River Northwest of Seling. It is about 55 km from Aizawl.
- Serlui with length of 56.33 flows through Kolasib district and is impounded by the Serlui B Dam.

== Lakes ==
- The Palak lake, the biggest in Mizoram is situated in Saiha District which is part of southern Mizoram covering 30 hectares (74 acres). It is believed that the lake was created as a result of an earthquake or a flood. The local people believe that a village which was submerged still remains intact deep under the waters.
- The Tam Dil lake is a natural lake situated 85 km (53 mi) from Aizawl. Legend has it that a huge mustard plant once stood in this place. When the plant was cut down, jets of water sprayed from the plant and created a pool of water, thus the lake was named Ţamdil which means of 'Lake of Mustard Plant'. Today the lake is an important tourist attraction and a holiday resort.
- Rih Dil is located in Burma, a few kilometres from the India-Burma border. It was believed that the departed souls pass through this lake before making their way to Pialral or heaven.

== Waterfalls ==
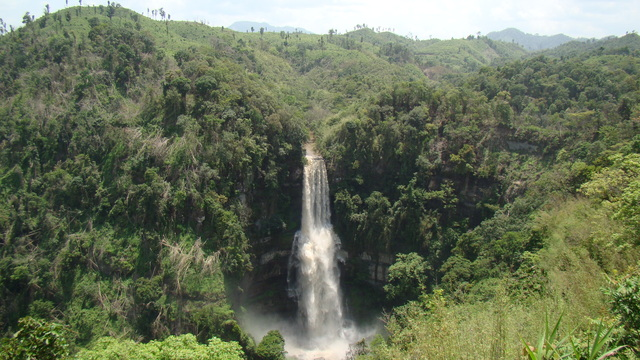
Vantawng Falls

- Vantawng Falls is located 5 kilometres (3.1 mi) south of Thenzawl in Serchhip district in the Indian state of Mizoram. It is a two-tiered waterfall with a total height of 228.6 metres
- Tuirihiau falls uniqueness is that you see from behind as it caves in behind the fall like an arc

== See also ==
- Geography of India
- Tourism in Northeast India
