= Economy of Mizoram =

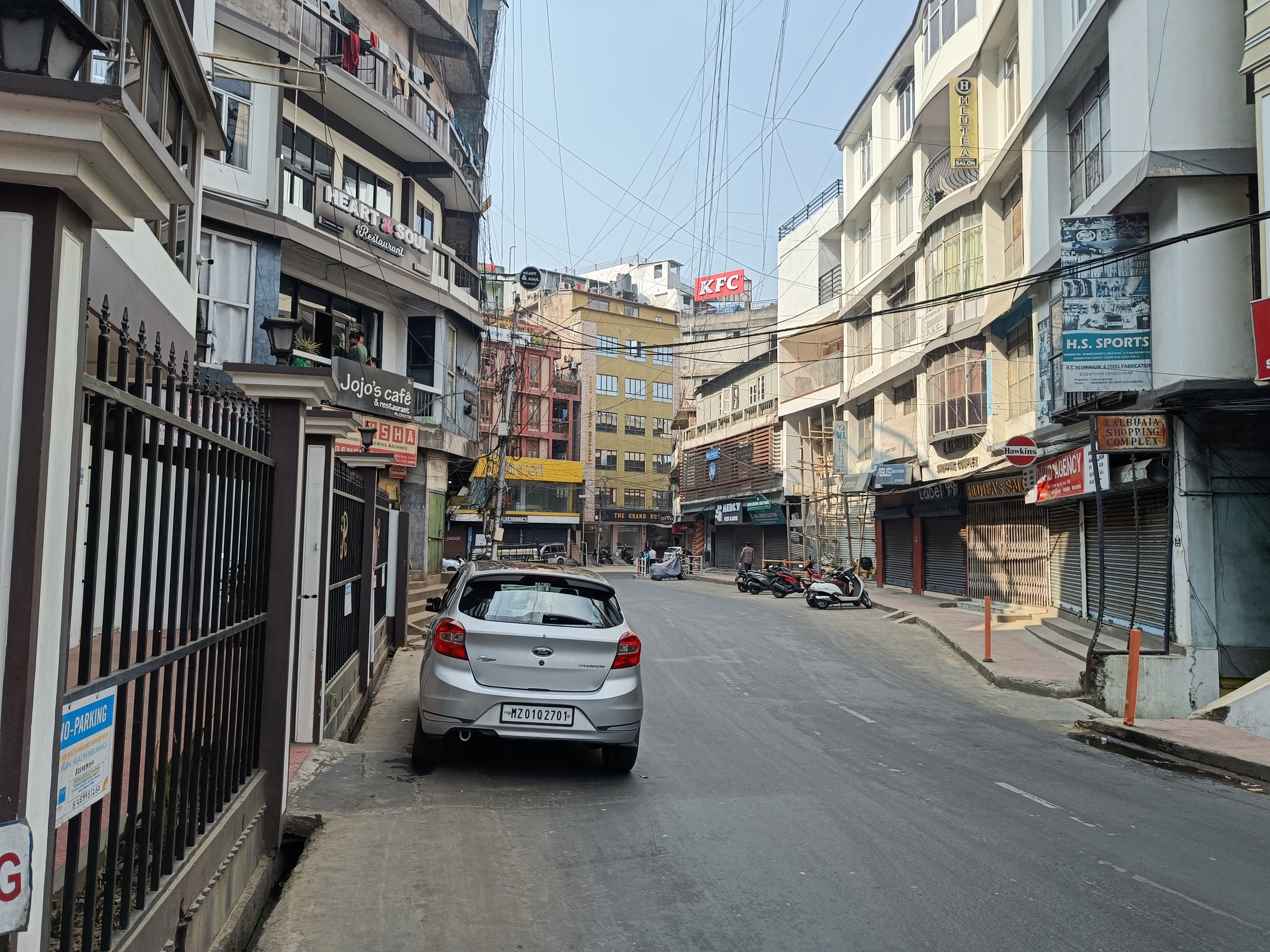
- Aizawl - the capital of Mizoram

Statistics
- Population: ▲1,308,967 (2025)
- GDP: ▲₹0.43817 trillion (US$4.6 billion) (nominal; 2026 est.) ▲$21.23 billion (PPP; 2026 est.)
- GDP rank: 32nd
- GDP growth: 6% (FY 2025)
- GDP per capita: ▲$4,093 (nominal; 2026 est.) ▲$17,499(PPP; 2026 est.)
- GDP per capita rank: 19th
- GDP by sector: Agriculture 18% Industry 33% Services 49% (FY 2023-24)
- Inflation (CPI): ▼3.16% (2025)
- Population below national poverty line: ▼3.77% (2023)
- Human Development Index: ▲0.810 (2023) 9th
- All values, unless otherwise stated, are in US dollars.

Mizoram is one of the fastest growing economies among the states of India with a per capital income of Rs 308571. Mizoram had the second highest GSDP growth during the 11th Five Year Plan (2007–2012) in Northeast India at 11% exceeding the target of 7.8% which is also much higher than the national average of 7.9%. During the 10th Five Year Plan (2002–2007), the Gross State Domestic Product (GSDP) was expected to grow at around 5.3% but grew at 5.7%. The biggest contributors to GSDP growth are agriculture, public administration and construction work. The tertiary sector of the service sector continued to have the contribution to the GSDP with its share hovering between 58% and 60% during the past half a decade.

== History ==
The Mizos had long been open to the outside world before the advent of the British in the 1870s. In former times the Mizos used to collected rubber and barter that with salt. During the Lushai expedition of 1871, a rupee would have given a fowl. The initial traders after British invasion of 1872 were Bengali Traders in Bepari Bazar near Sairang. in 1922 there were only 91 shops in all of Mizoram. There were only 2 shops in Lunglei in 1914. The Colonial state encouraged people to stop barter and encouraged monetary exchange so that it would be easier to collect household tax. The cash economy encouraged the Mizos to explore new trade routes in Kachin. The practice of shifting cultivation or jhumming started in Mizoram after they learned that their crops could earn them money, earlier agriculture was practised purely for sustenance. Wet rice cultivation was started only in 1809 at Champhai by the British Colonial rulers to boost agriculture so that they could supply rice to their soldiers without having to import them. Chief Khamliana was among the first to plant oranges, pineapples, rubber, jackfruit and guava in Mizoram.

Mizoram's cash economy also quickly expanded to labour. Mizos have a practice of voluntary labour which they do to help those in distress and people in need, the British relied on forced labour and the missionaries on child labour. Later the authorities introduced labour from the 1900s onward and wage was initially paid in the form of salt and later in terms of money. Wage labour catalysed Mizoram's economy and encouraged many to join a career in the army.

== Agriculture ==
Around 65% of the population of the state depended on agriculture, the sector's contribution to the GSDP was only 19.84% during the same period and that of the industry was 20.20%. The Economic Survey indicated that 32% of the cultivated area was under jhum and only 20%t of the demand for rice could be met within the state while a total of 1,428,600 tonnes of rice was lifted by the state government from outside. More than 70% of the total population is engaged in some form of agriculture. The age-old practice of Jhum is being discouraged by the state government with schemes like the New Land Use Policy a Policy to help farmers move away from the traditional slash-and-burn method of cultivation. Recently, Mizoram Government has entered into a new venture wherein Oil Palm and Jatropha cultivation, for biofuels is being promoted.

== Education ==
Education is an important industry for Mizoram. It boasts of a large number of schools in the state which employ a number of people. Mizoram has one Central University, Mizoram University and NIT Mizoram which is still functioning out of a rented place. The investment in Education sector other than Government in the state are ICFAI University, Mizoram and Church institutions like St. Xavier's College, Lengpui, Higher and Technical Institute of Mizoram, Helen Lowry College of Arts & Commerce. These quality Education investment not only help in producing quality education but also provide education and save tuition fees which would otherwise be remitted outside the state.

== Energy ==
Mizoram has 2 Hydr Power Plants, the 60 MW Tuirial Dam and 12 MW Serlui B Dam. Mizoram's current power demand is now only 115 MW. With other power Projects like 24 MW Tuirini Hydel Project, 210 Tuivai Hydel Project in the pipeline, Mizoram is soon expected to be not only power surplus but exporter of power. There is also plan for a 20 MW solar park in Mizoram. It is estimated that Mizoram still spends 25–28 crores for buying power from outside the state every month

== Tourism ==
Mizoram is yet to establish itself as a tourist destination for both Indians and non-Indians alike. Tourists mostly visit such attractions as the hill stations of Lalsavunga Park, Reiek and Hmuifang. National parks and wildlife sanctuaries such as Phawngpui National Park, Murlen National Park and Dampa Tiger Reserve. Vantawng Falls and Tuirihiau falls in Thenzawl. Growth in tourism is abysmal due to lack of policy and incompetence of Government officials. The tourism industry is mainly concentrated in building tourist Lodges and highway restaurants without invitation of foreign or outside of the state investment in building up the Tourism infrastructure. During 2009–14 against only Rs 266.85 lakh was collected as revenue from these Lodges and highway restaurants.

== Alcohol ==
The Mizoram Liquor (Prohibition and Control) or MLPC Act of 2014 allowed opening of liquor shops and bars in the State and replaced the Mizoram Liquor Total Prohibition (MLTP) Act of 1995. As of March 2017, the State of 1.1 million people had 71,158 liquor card holders. A card holder is entitled to six 750ml bottles of IMFL and 10 bottles each of wine and beer a month from 51 operational outlets. Mizoram collected Rs 19.44 crore tax revenue from the sale of liquor in 8 months after the MLPC Act 2014 came into force in the state from January 16, 2015.

== Industry ==
Mizoram is facing a number of difficulties in the advancement of industries. Lack of means of dependable surface transport and poor accessibility is one of the major drawbacks. Other problems faced by the state were the poor mineral resources, non-availability of good infrastructure and communication facilities, shortage of capital and lack of modern skills. A Software Technology Park is however being established in Mizoram University campus. A Steel Plant is also being established in Mizoram.

== Macro-economic trend ==
Below is a chart of trends in gross state product of Mizoram at market prices estimated by Ministry of Statistics and Programme Implementation with figures in millions of Indian rupees.

Year	Nominal GDP (in rupees)
1980	680,500,000
1985	1,810,000,000
1990	3,410,000,000
1995	9,370,000,000
2000	17,690,000,000
2022	345600,000,000
