= Thenzawl Golf Course =

In Thenzawl, India

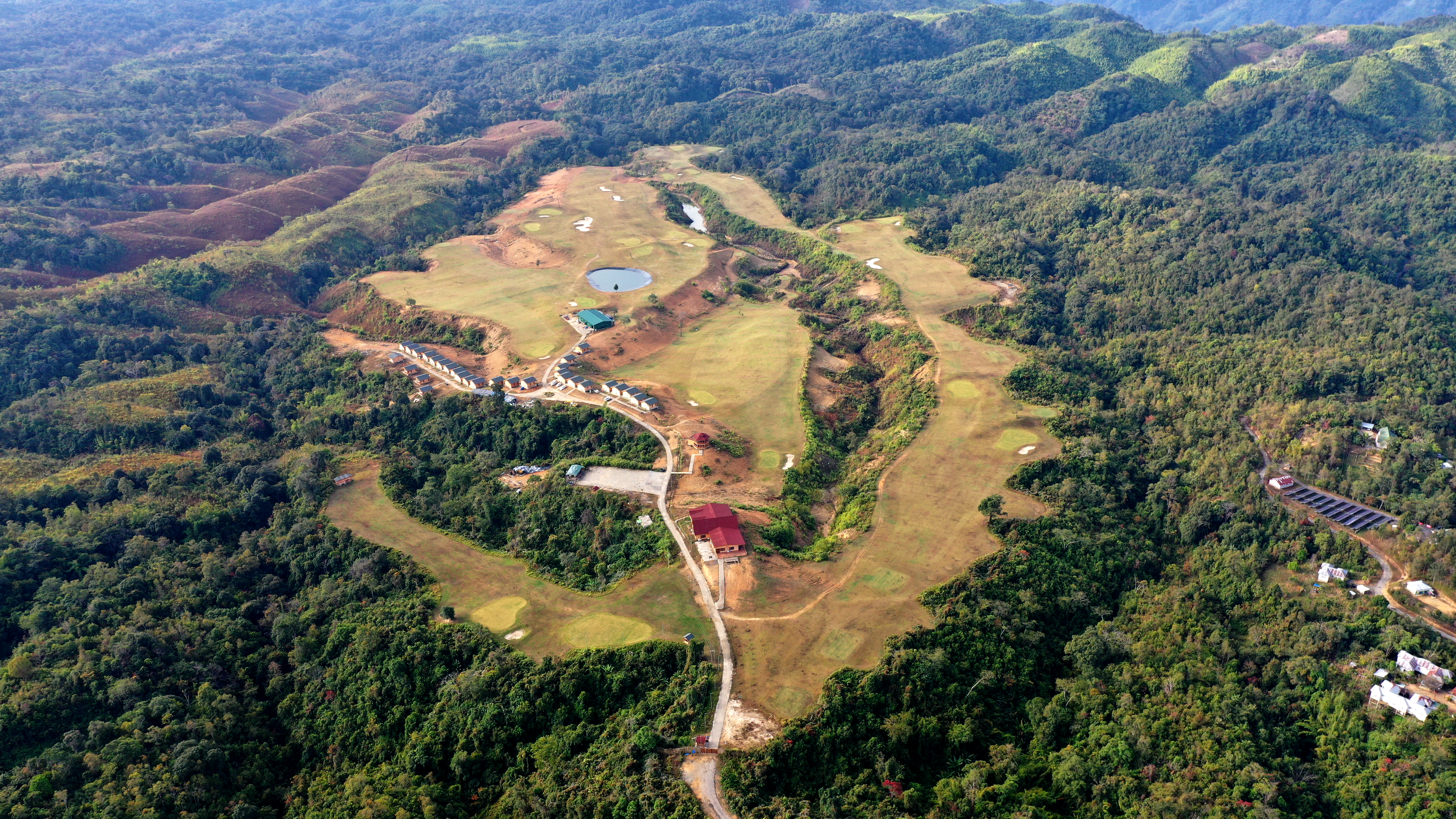

Club information
- Location: Thenzawl, Mizoram
- Established: 2020
- Type: Public
- Owner: Government of Mizoram
- Tota holes: 18
- Website: thenzawlgolfclub.com
- Designed by: Graham Cooke and Associates.
- Par: 72
- Length: 7,500 yards (6,900 m)

The Thenzawl golf course is a public golf course in a meadow at Thenzawl in Mizoram, India. The golf course is set at an altitude of 2568 feet. It is owned by the State Government of Mizoram. The course extends over 105 acres and the play space is 75 acres and comprises 18 holes.

== History ==
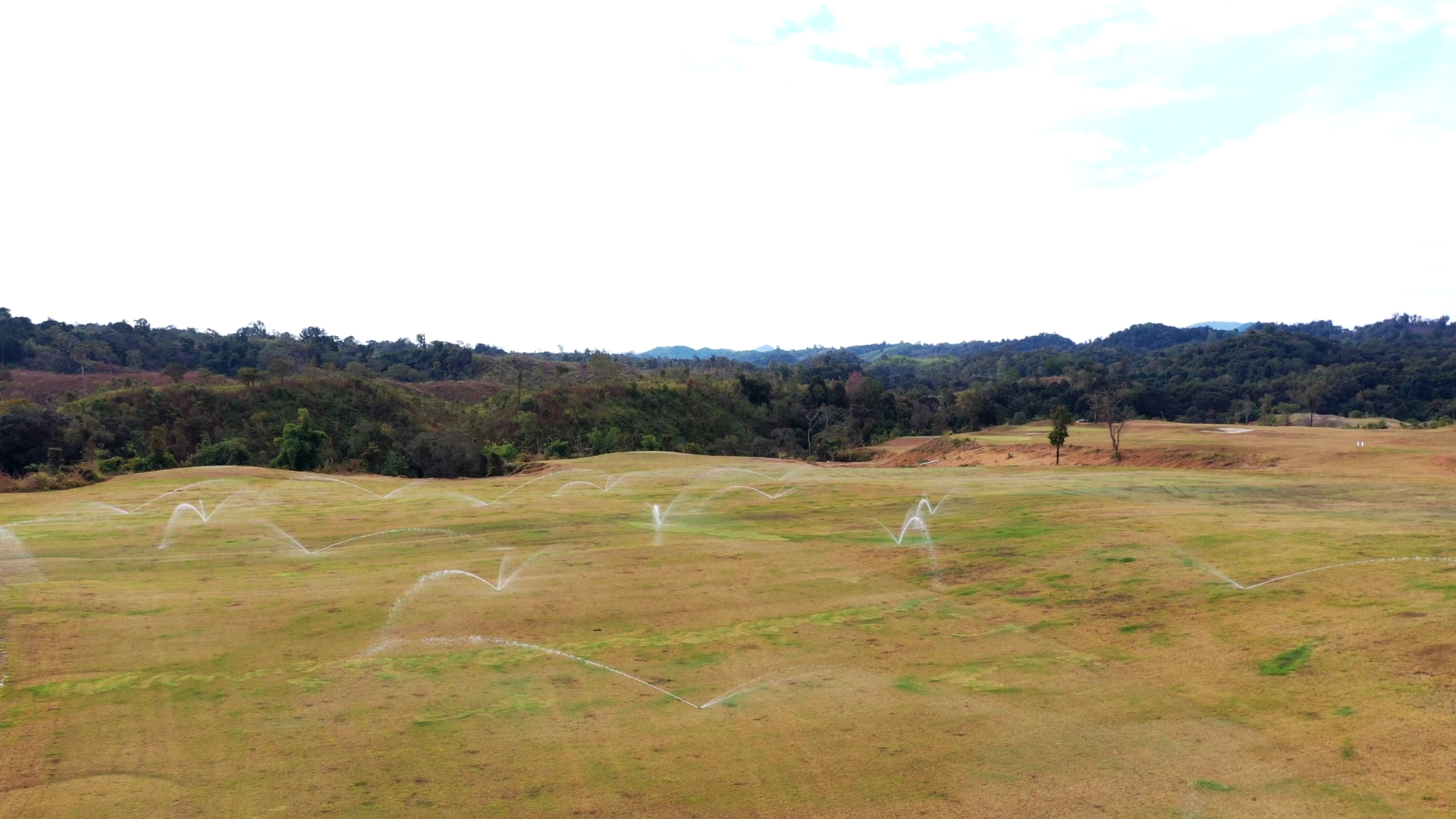
Thenzawl golf course

The golf course was inaugurated by Union minister of state for culture and tourism (independent charge) Prahlad Singh Patel on 4 August 2020. This golf course has been developed under Swadesh Darshan Scheme at the cos tof ₹64.48 crore. The Golf Course has been designed by Graham Cooke and Associates, a Canadian firm. It also has automated sprinkler irrigation system by Rain Bird, USA.

== Facilities ==
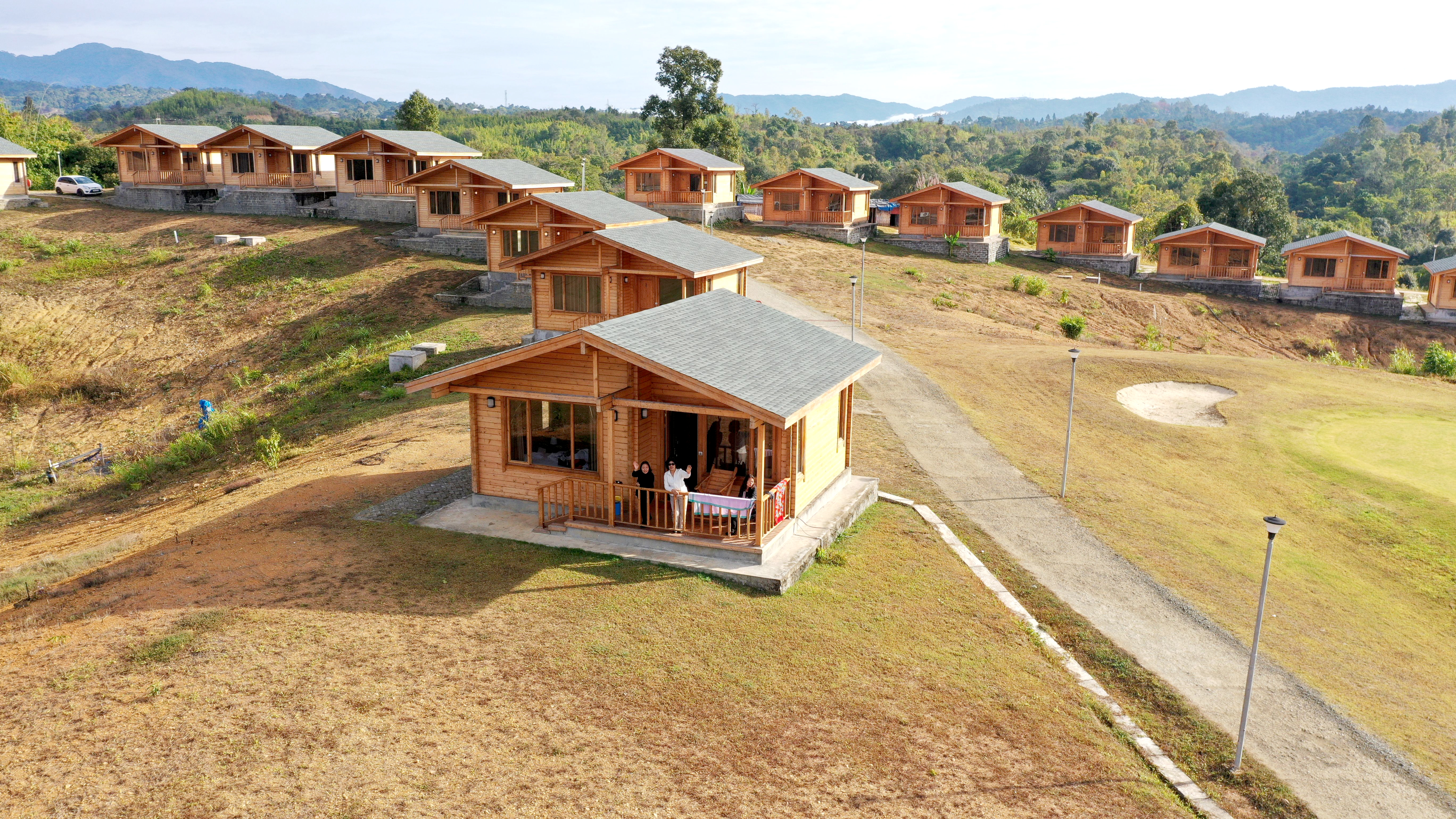
Thenzawl golf course log house

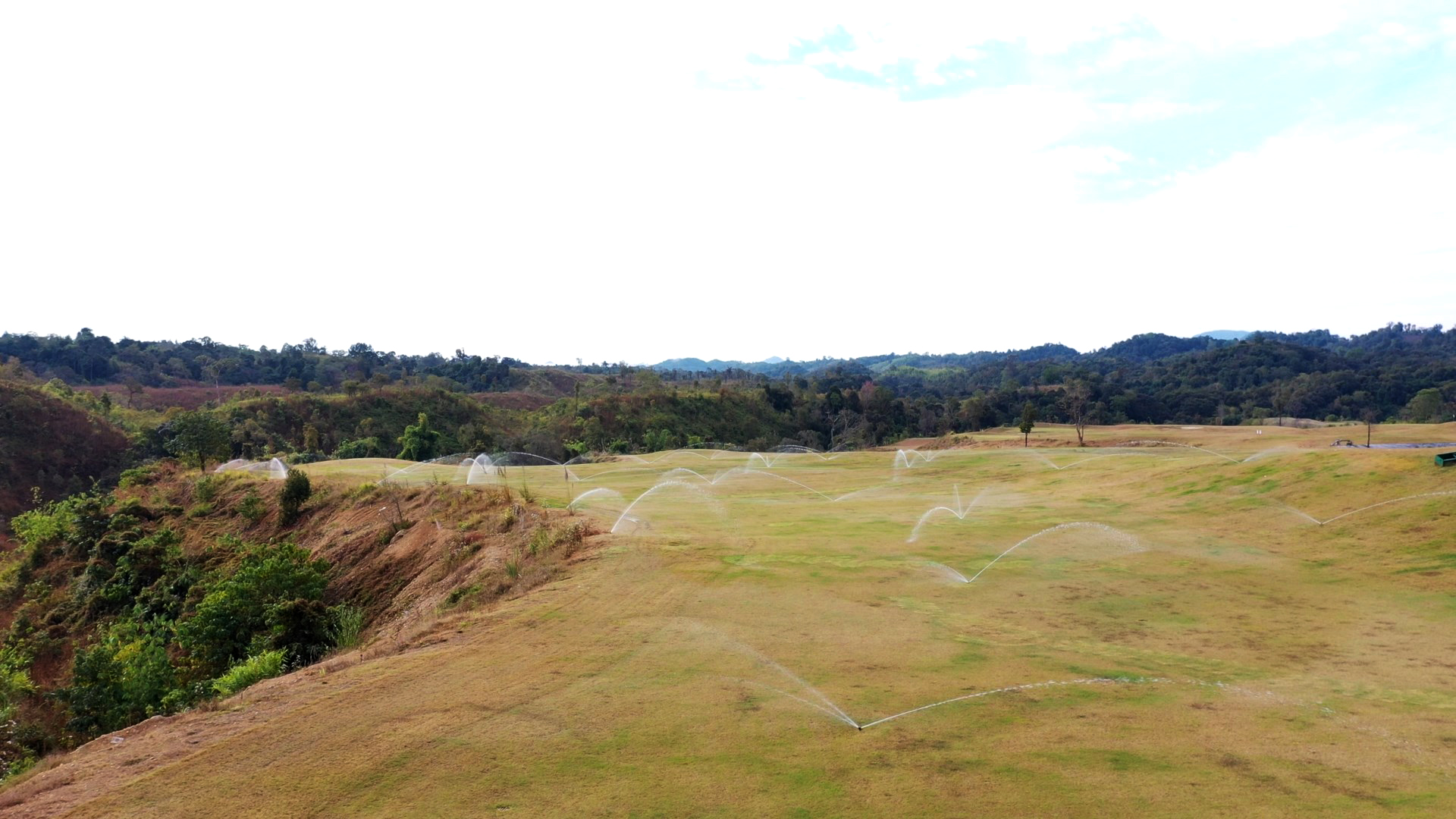
Thenzawl 18 hole golf course

Accommodation for golfers is provided by the golf club with an annex with thirty fully furnished log of Siberian pinewoods.

== See also ==
Tourism in Mizoram
