= Thenzawl Peace City =

Planned city in Mizoram

Thenzawl Peace City Thenzawl Muanna Khawpui TPC
- City
- Country: India
- Region: Northeast India
- State: Mizoram
- District: Serchhip district
- Announced: 4 April 2025; 17 months ago

Thenzawl Peace City (Mizo: Thenzawl Muanna Khawpui), is a proposed planned city located in Thenzawl in the Serchhip District of the Indian state of Mizoram.

== Etymology ==
The name "Peace City" has been linked to state's post-conflict stability following the Mizoram Peace Accord of 1986.

== History ==
The proposal to develop Thenzawl Peace City was first announced on 4 April 2025 by Chief Minister Lalduhoma at a conference of the Vantawng group of the Young Mizo Association (YMA) held at Buangpui village in Serchhip district.

In 2025, the Ministry of Housing and Urban Affairs approved funding for preparation of a detailed master plan for the project.

== See also ==
- Nagaki Global City
