= Tourism in Mizoram =

Mizoram
- State
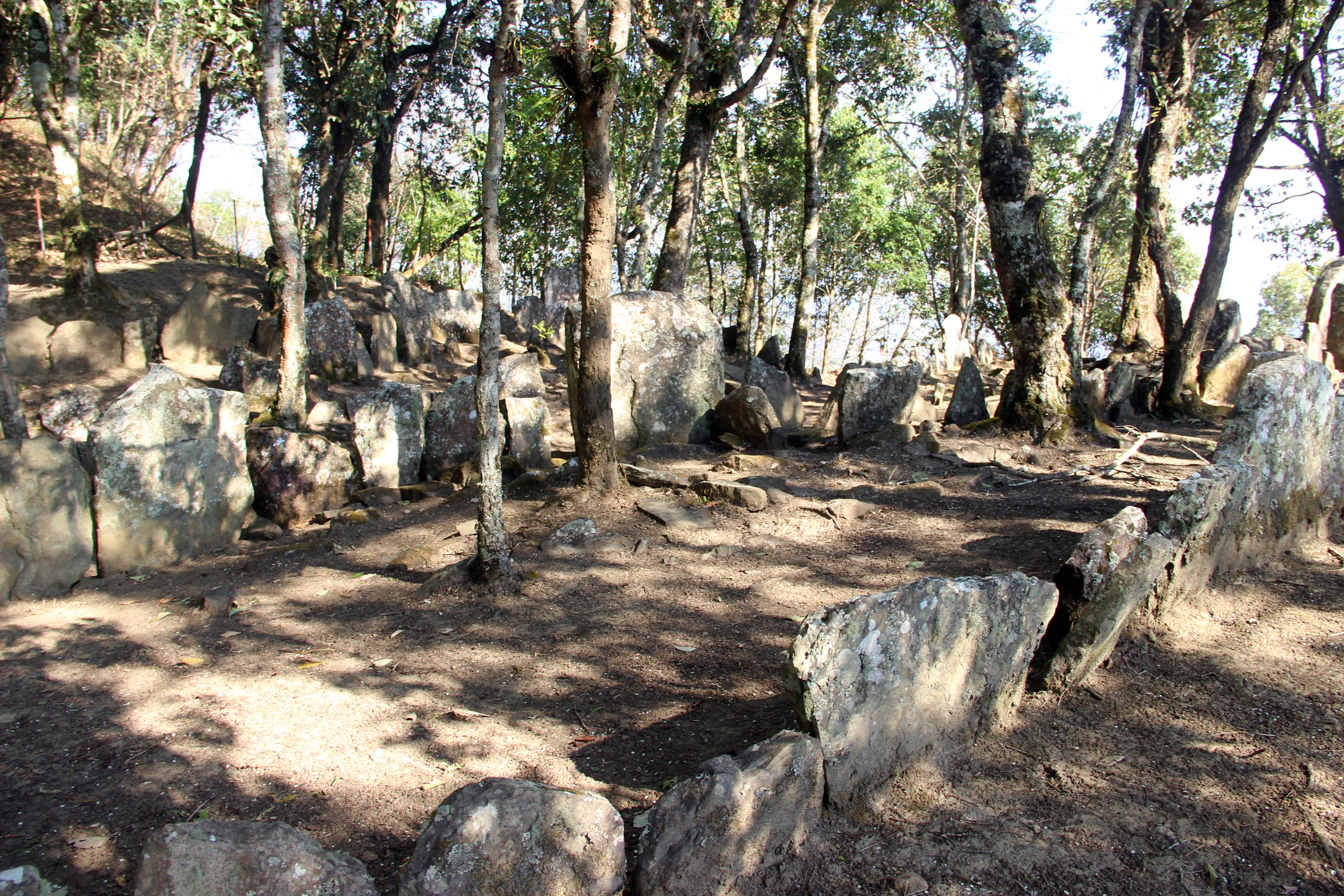

- Location of Mizoram (marked in red) in India
- Coordinates (Aizawl): 23.36°N 92.8°E
- Country: India
- Region: Northeast India
- Capital: Aizawl

Population (2011)
  - Total: 1,091,014
- Official language: Mizo.
- Website: mizoram.gov.in
- ^{†} It was elevated to the status of a full State by the State of Mizoram Act, 1986

Mizoram is a state in the northeast of India. Mizoram is considered by many as a beautiful place due to its landscape and pleasant climate. There have been many attempts to increase revenue through tourism but many potential tourists find the lack of amenities to be a hurdle. However, the State continues to promote itself and many projects have been initiated. The tourism ministry continues to maintain or upgrade its tourist lodges throughout the state. Foreign tourists are required to obtain an 'inner line permit' under the special permit before visiting. The permit can be obtained from Indian missions abroad for a limited number of days or direct from Mizoram Government authorities within India. The state is rich in bird diversity, which has the potentiality to make it a major birding destination. Mizoram is a stronghold for Mrs. Hume's pheasant (Syrmaticus humiae). There is also a rare record of the wild water buffalo from the state. There are several past records of the Sumatran rhinoceros from Mizoram, then Lushai Hills. The small population of wild elephants can be seen in Ngengpui and Dampa Sanctuaries.

== Major Towns and Cities of Mizoram ==
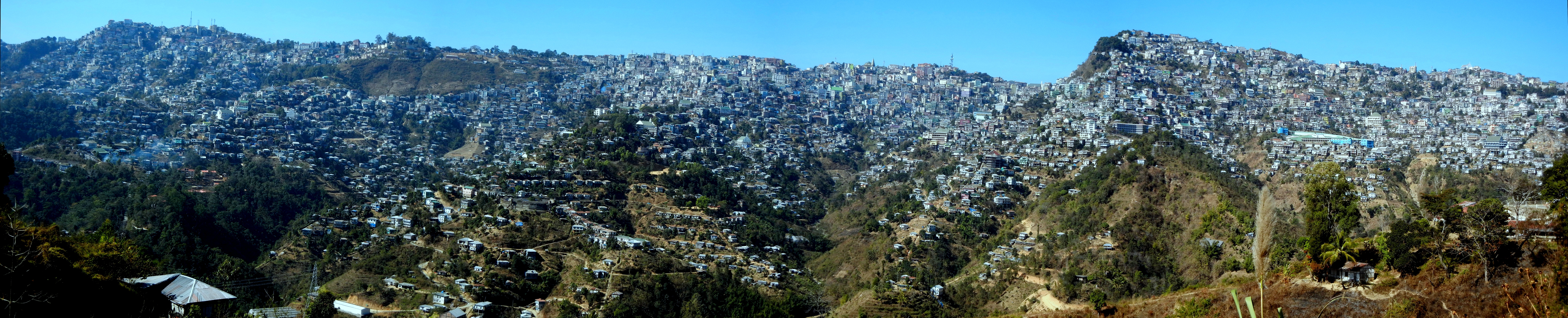
A panorama of Aizawl taken from Zemabawk

=== Aizawl ===
Aizawl is the capital of the state of Mizoram in India. It is also the centre of all important government offices, state assembly house and civil secretariat. The main tourist attraction in Aizawl are:

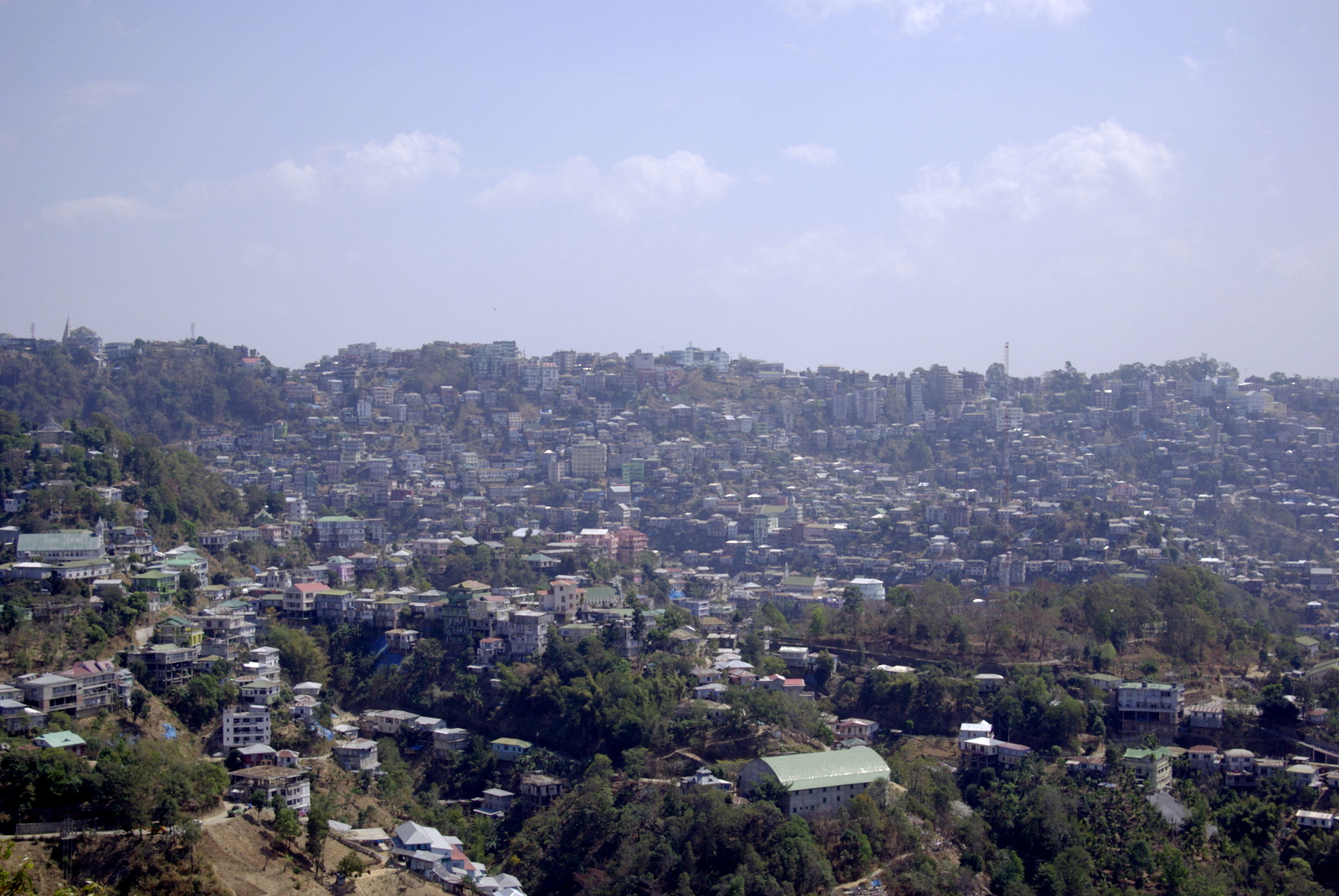
View of Aizawl

- Hmuifang is about 50 km from Aizawl with an elevation of 1619 metres, the mountain is still covered with virgin forests reserved since the Mizo Chief's time
- Baktawng Village 70 km from Aizawl is the place where Pu Ziona lives with the "worlds largest existing family" with 39 wives, 94 children, 14 daughters-in-law and 33 grandchildren India.

=== Khawbung ===
Khawbung is a sub-town and the administrative headquarters of Khawbung RD Block in Champhai District. The village has an interesting tourist site "Mizo Poets' Square". Archived from the original on 26 September 2016. which is also known as Mizo Hlakungpui Mual. There is much historical and natural heritage in its neighboring villages which are included in Hlakungpui Package Tourism.

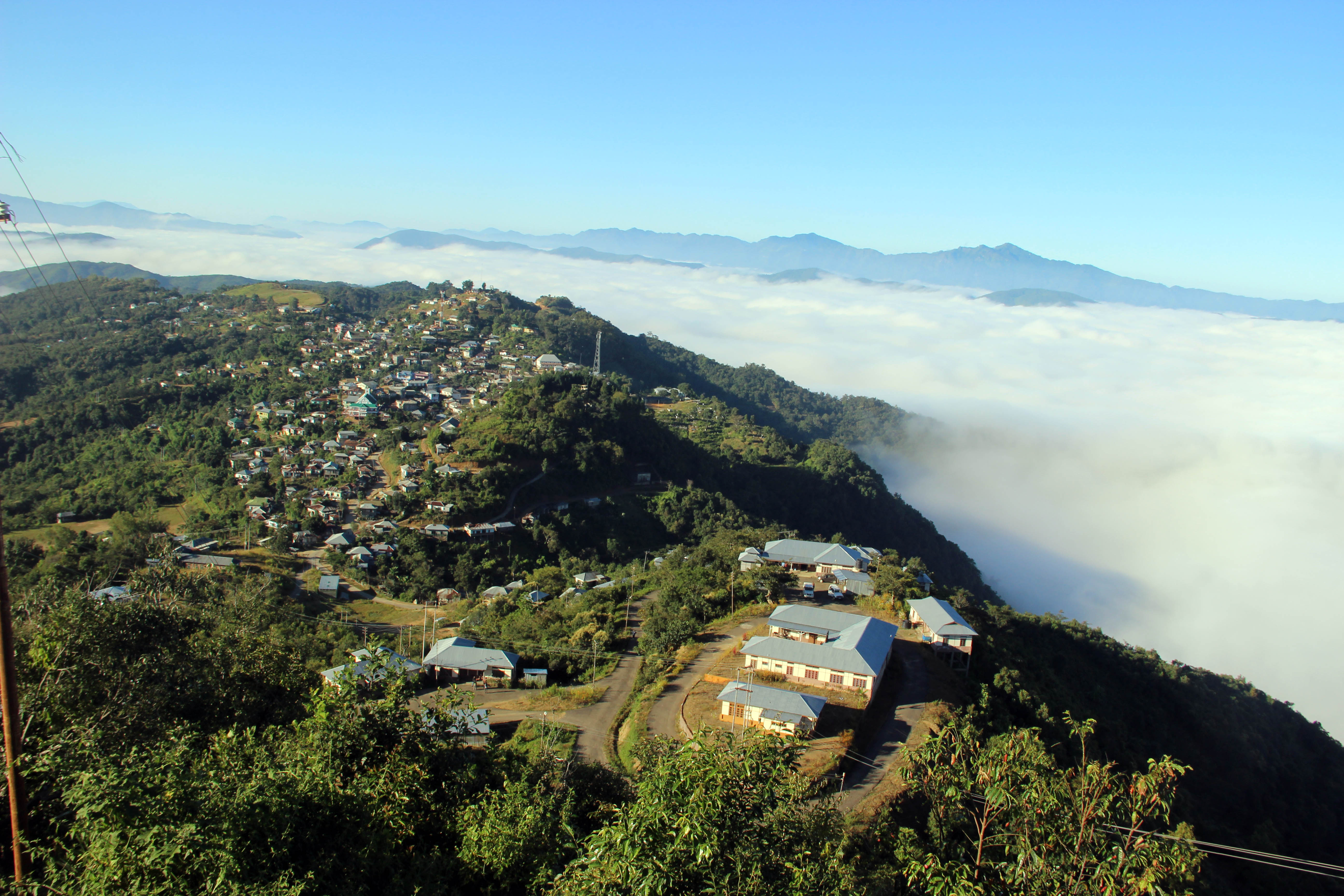
View of Khawbung Sub-Town

- Mizo Hlakungpui Mual- is a monument to commemorate Mizo poets. It was set up in 1986. It is located at the southern edge of Khawbung Village.
- Kawtchhuah Ropui is a cluster of megaliths found near Vangchhia Village. Nearly 200 stones were erected. Those stones were dressed with embossed figures. It was declared as National Importance of Heritage in India.

=== Thenzawl ===
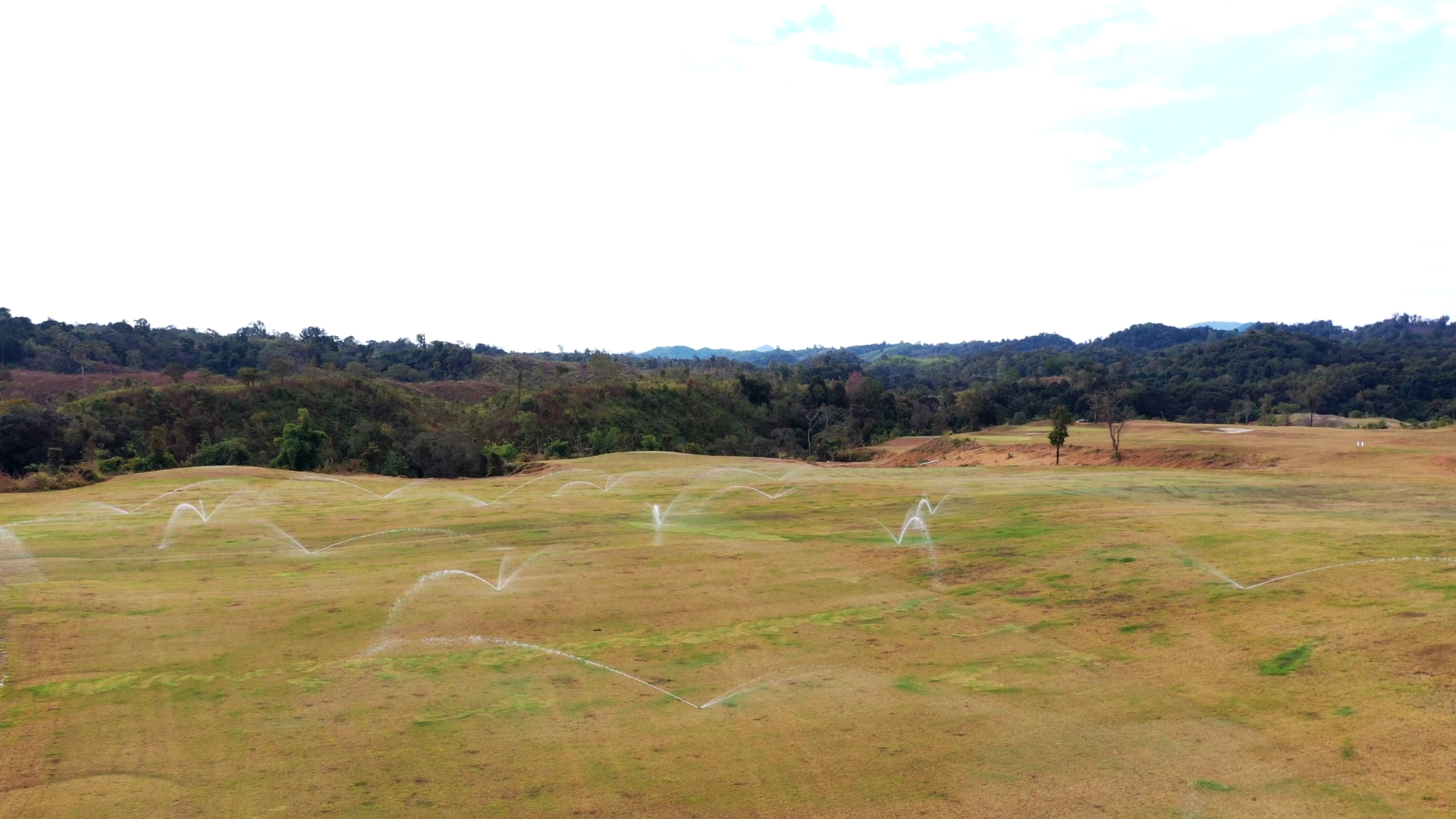
Thenzawl golf course

Thenzawl is a beautiful town located in the middle of Mizoram, the main tourist attractions are:

- Vantawng Falls is located 5 kilometres (3.1 mi) south of Thenzawl.
- Thenzawl Golf Course extends over 105 acres with play area of 75 acres and comprises 18 holes.
- Benkhuaia Thlan is the founder of Thenzawl Bengkhuaia invaded Alexandrapur in 1871 kidnapping Mary Winchester which brought about the British to Mizoram. He died in 1879.
- Vaibiak is the place from where they took back Mary Winchester.
- Tualvungi Thlan - There are two graves at Phulpui village in the Aizawl district of Mizoram India. It is said that, Zawlpala, Chief of Phulpui village, married the legendary beauty, Talvungi of Thenzawl. Talvungi was subsequently married to the chief of Rothai, Punthia. But, Talvungi could not forget Zawlpala, her previous husband. After many years when Zawlpala died, grief-stricken Talvungi came to Phulpui, dug a pit by the side of Zawlpala's grave and asked an old woman to kill her and bury her in the grave.
- Chawngchilhi Puk is a cave located near the Lunglei-Thenzawl Road, a highway in this area. This cave is featured in a folk tale of a love story between a lady and a snake.
- Tuirihiau falls is a beautiful waterfall near Thenzawl, upstream of Vantawng fall.
- Thenzawl Deer Park has 17 deer (11 female and 6 male) in natural environment.

=== Lunglei ===
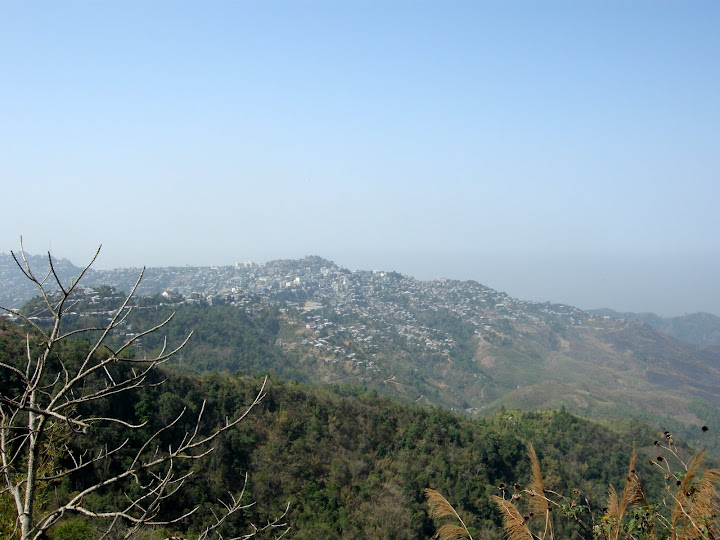
View of Lunglei

Lunglei is a serene town and a major urban hub, situated in the south-central part of Mizoram. Lunglei district borders Bangladesh on the west via Tlabung sub-division which is an up-and-coming trading center. The name Lunglei means 'stone- lung' and 'bridge- lei' or Stonebridge named after a natural bridge made of stones a few kilometers from the town's area which used to attract curious visitors. The Main Tourist Attractions in Lunglei are:

- Zobawk Sports Academy
- Kawmzawl Park
- Khawnglung Wildlife Sanctuary
- Saikuti Hall where most of the concerts and celebrations are held. A unique museum has also been established in the hall where local painters demonstrate their skill and exhibit their works.
- Thuamluaia Mual is the second football stadium with Artificial turf in Mizoram.

== Hill stations ==
=== Hmuifang Tlang ===
Hmuifang is a tourist spot near Aizawl, Mizoram. It is about 50 km from Aizawl. With an elevation of 1619 metres, the mountain is still covered with virgin forests reserved since the Mizo Chief's time. Hmuifang is on the way to Lunglei.

=== Reiek Tlang ===
Reiek is a tourist 12 km from Aizawl. It rests at an elevation of 1548 metres, overlooking Aizawl and offers a view of the surrounding valleys and hills, on a clear day the plains of Bangladesh can be seen from the top of the hill. Reiek Hill is surrounded by thick lush green temperate trees and bushes.

=== Sakawrhmuituai Tlang ===
Sakawrhmuituai is a tourist spot about 21.7 km from Aizawl, Mizoram, India. With an elevation of 1,535 metres.

== Lakes ==
=== Palak Dil ===
Palak dïl (lit. Palak Lake) or Pala Tipo (in Mara language) is the biggest lake in Mizoram.

== Festivals ==
=== Chapchar Kut ===
Chapchar Kut is another festival celebrated during March after completion of their most arduous task of Jhum operation i.e., jungle-clearing (clearing of the remnants of burning). This is a spring festival celebrated with great fervour and gaiety.

== Wildlife ==
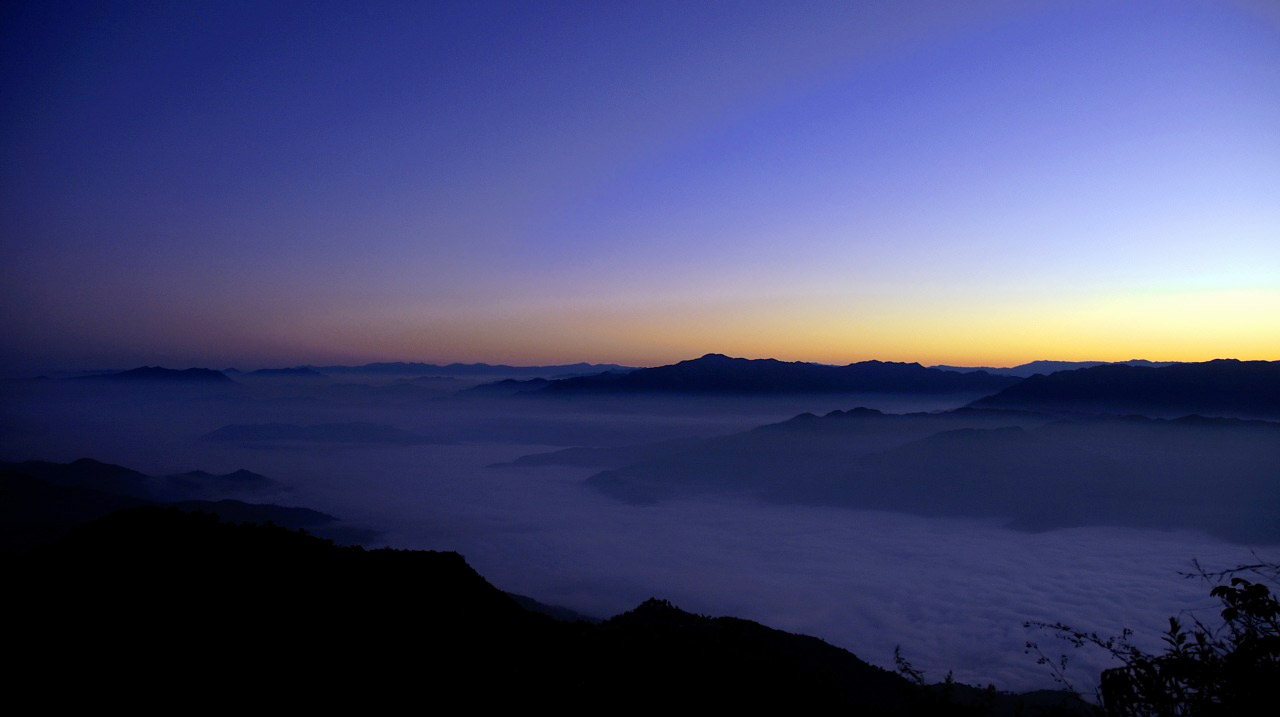
Phawngpui

=== Phawngpui ===
Phawngpui is the highest mountain peak in Mizoram, rising about 2157 metres high near the Myanmar border in Chhimtuipui District. Phawngpui Peak is famous for orchids and rhododendrons.

=== Dampa Tiger Reserve ===
Dampa Tiger Reserve is the largest wildlife sanctuary in Mizoram, was notified in 1985 and declared a tiger reserve in 1994. It is situated in the western part of Mizoram state, on the international border with Bangladesh about 127 km from Aizawl. It covers an area of approximately 550 km^{2}. The tropical Forests of Dampa are home to rich flora and fauna. It consists of forest interpolated with steep precipitous hills, deep valleys, jungle streams, ripping rivulets, natural salts licks, with an altitudinal zone of 200 m to 800 m. Dampa Tiger Reserve is a part of Project Tiger funded by the Government of India.

=== Murlen National Park ===
Murlen National Park is a national park located in the Champhai district Mizoram in India. The size of the park area is 200 km^{2}. The park is situated about 245 km east of Aizawl, and is close to the Chin Hills. It covers an area of approximately 100 km^{2}. The Tropical, Semi evergreen and Sub montane Forests of Murlen are home to a rich variety of flora and fauna. About 15 species of mammals, 150 species of birds, 35 species of Medicinal plants. 2 species of bamboos & 4 species of orchids so far have been recorded in this Park.At present, 36 people are involved in conservation work of Murlen National Park.

== See also ==
- Tourism in North East India
- Tourism in Assam
