= Sakawrhmuituai =

Mountain in India

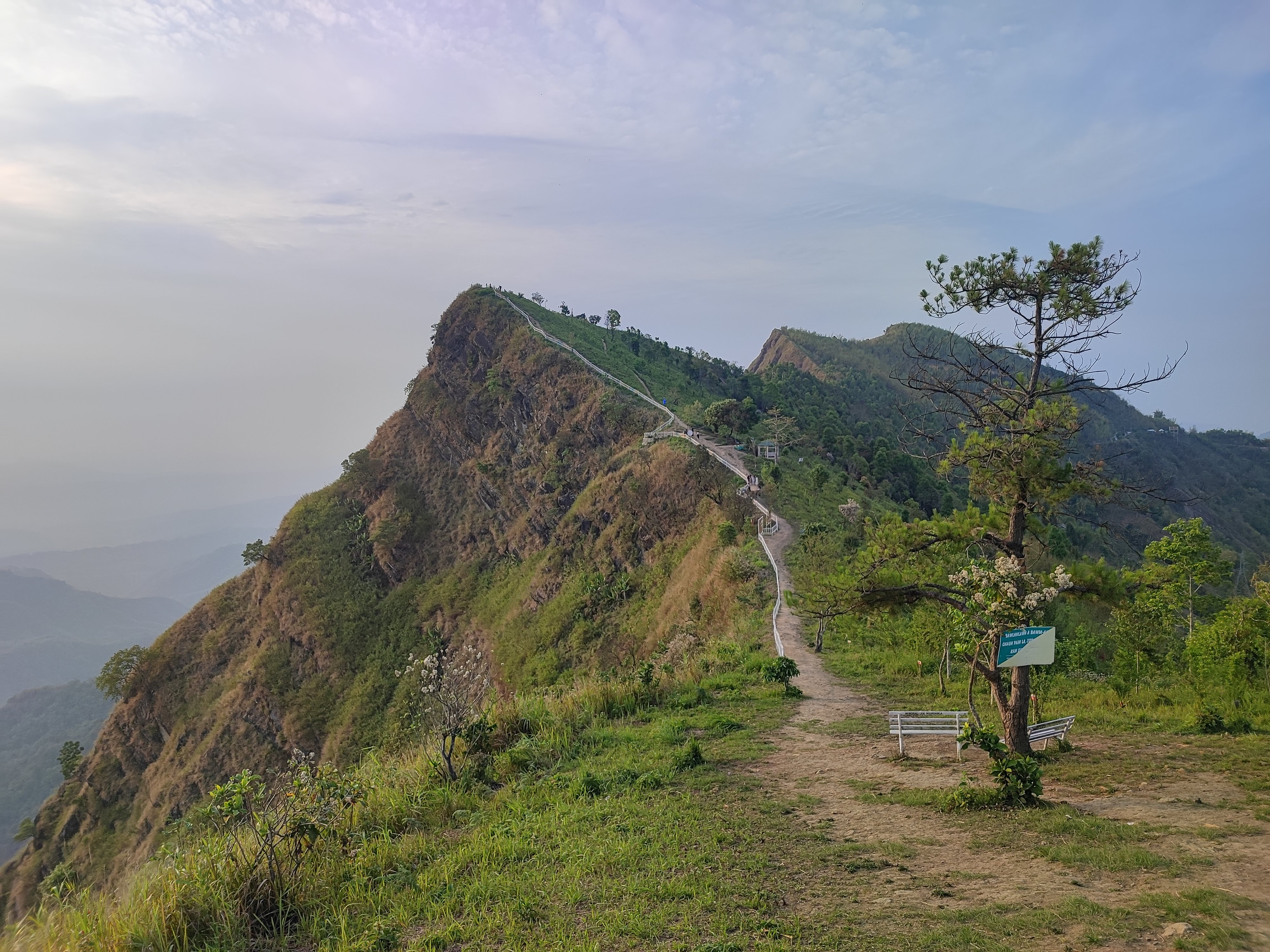
- Sakawrhmuituai Mountainside

Highest point
- Elevation: 1,535 m (5,036 ft)
- Coordinates: 23°51′07″N 92°44′33″E

Geography
- Location: Aizawl District, Mizoram, India
- Parent range: Lushai Hills

Geology
- Rock age: around 10th BC
- Mountain type: volcanic eruption

Sakawrhmuituai is a tourist spot about 21.7 km from Aizawl, Mizoram, India. With an elevation of 1,535 metres.

== Ridgeline Trail ==
Annual downhill track ride competitions are held starting from the peak of the mountain till main road annually.

== Skywalk and Ropeway ==
Tourism Minister, Mr John Rotluangliana laid foundation stone for Eco-Adventure Circuit Aizawl-Sakawrhmuituai Tlang (Skywalk and Ropeway) on 3rd April 2018. Rs 99 Crore had been received for the development of the skywalk on land donated by Siphir and Lungdai village. The ropeway and the skywalk remain incomplete with corruption cases registered by anti corruption board in 2022. against then minister John Rotluangliana and the former director.

== See also ==
Tourism in Mizoram
