= Tuirihiau Falls =

- Tuirihiau Khawhthla in 2026
- Interactive map of Tuirihiau Falls
- Location: Serchhip district, Mizoram, India
- Coordinates: 23.2370°N 92.7491°E

The Tuirihiau Falls are located 5 kilometres (3.1 mi) south of Thenzawl in the Serchhip district in the Indian state of Mizoram. They are on the Vanva river near Buangpui and are sometimes mentioned together with the nearby Vantawng Falls. An unusual feature is that there are caves behind the Tuirihiau waterfalls, allowing people to see them from behind.

== Gallery ==
Bottom

View behind the waterfall

another view behind the watherfall

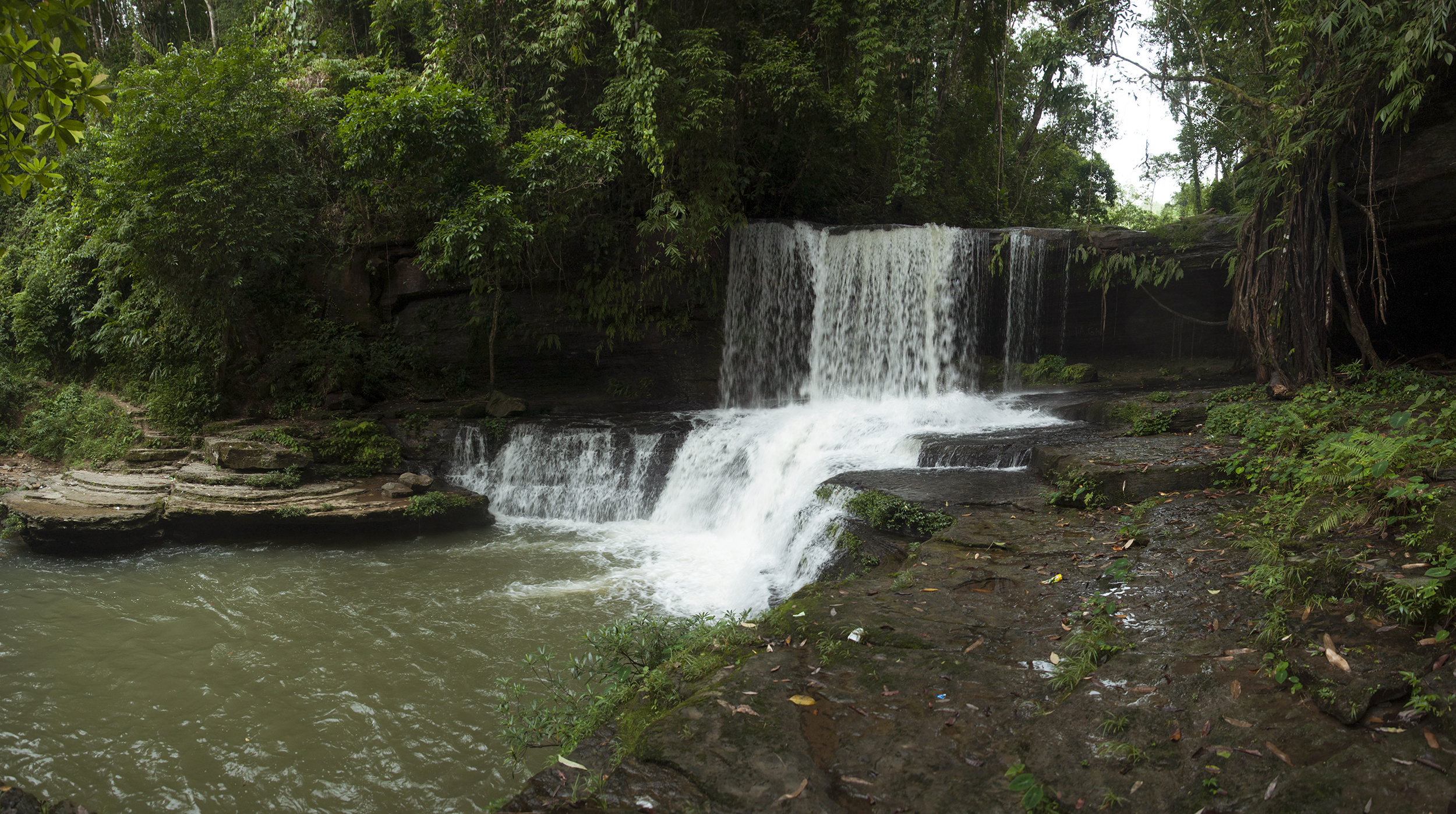
Tuirihiau Falls in 2016

Video of Tuirihiau Falls

== See also ==
- List of waterfalls
- List of waterfalls in India
- List of waterfalls in India by height
- Tourism in Mizoram
