= List of state highways in Mizoram =

Mizoram has an extensive highway network of 927 km with a road density of 43.97 km.

== State Highways ==
Some of the State Highways as per PWD of Mizoram.

1. Champhai - North Vanlaiphai Road
2. Keiṭum - North Vanlaiphai
3. Lunglei-Thenzawl road
4. Tlabung-Borapansury Road
5. Kawlchaw -Tongkolong Rd.
6. Aizawl-Mamit-Vanghmun-Kumarghat Rd
7. W.Phaileng to Marpara
8. Kawnpui to Hortoki Road
9. Saitual-Phullen-Suangpuilawn Road
10. Khawzawl-Sinzawl-Thanlawn Road
11. Kawlkulh-Ngopa-Mimbung Road

== National Highways ==
Some of the National Highway like 54 and 154 have been maintained by Mizoram State Government.

| Highway No. | Route | Passes through - district(s) | Length (in km) |
|---|---|---|---|
| 54 | Cachar - Kolasib: Aizawl - Serchhip - Lunglei - Tuipang | Silchar, Aizawl, Serchhip, Lunglei, Saiha | 550 |
| 154 | Bairabi - Bilkhawthlir | Kolasib, Aizawl, | 180 |
| 150 | Seling - Tipaimukh | Aizawl Churuchandpur | 700 |
| 44A | Sairang -Mamit - Tripura | Aizawl Aizawl Tripura | 230 |
