= Lalsavunga Park =

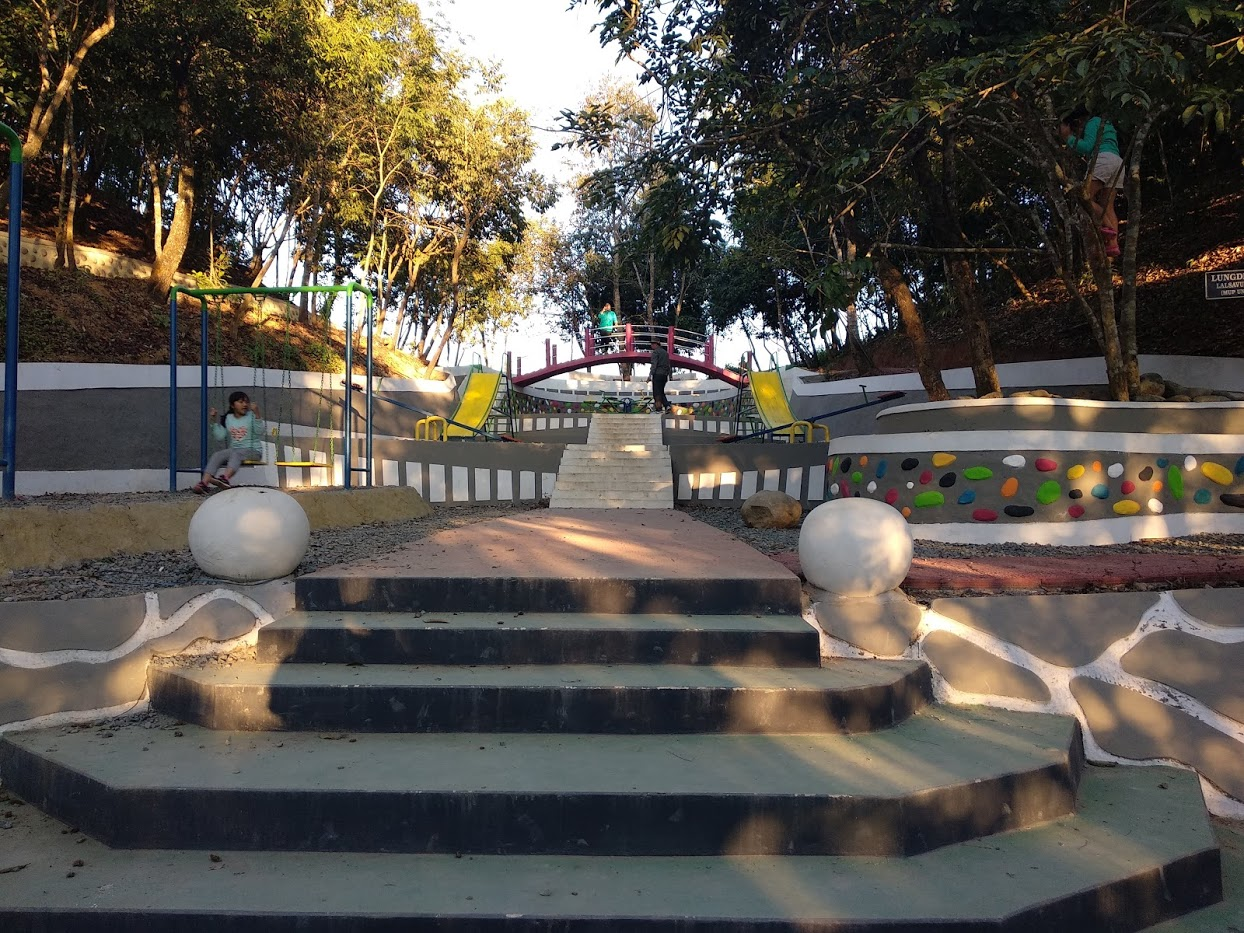

Highest point
- Elevation: 1,179 m (3,868 ft)
- Coordinates: 23.671606°N 92.7180847°E

Geography
- Location: South Hlimen Aizawl District, Mizoram, India
- Parent range: Lushai Hills

Lalsavunga Park is a tourist spot near Aizawl, Mizoram. It is about 18 km from Aizawl in South Hlimen. It is at an elevation of 1179 metres.

== History ==
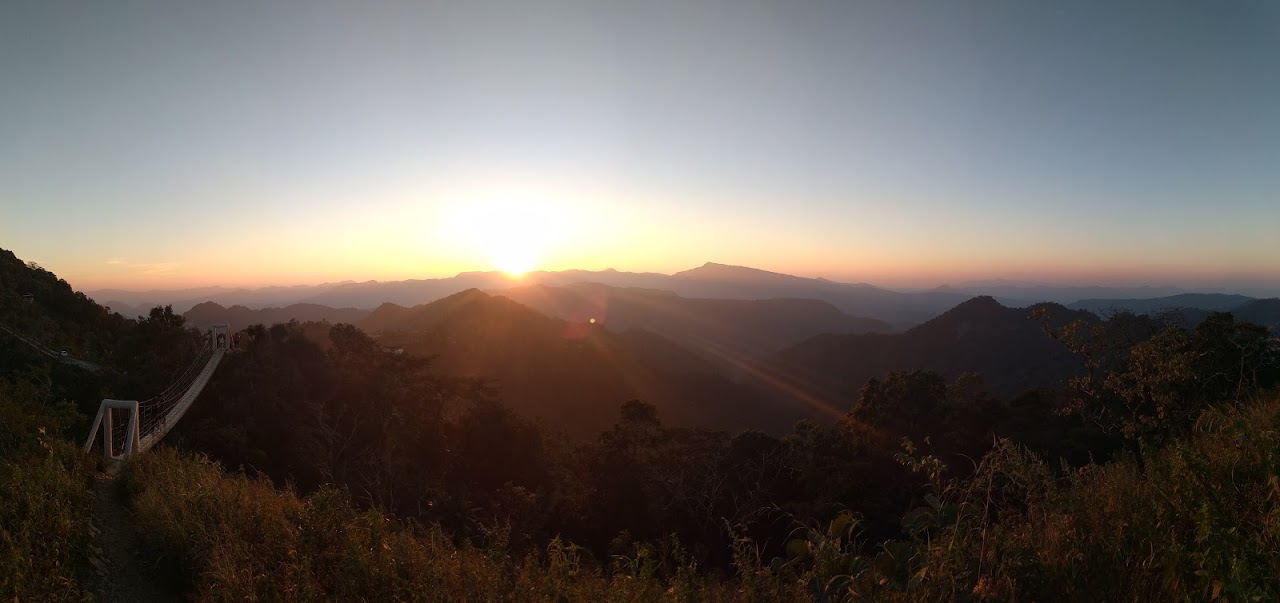
Lalsavunga Park Bridge

Lalsavunga Park construction started in 2014 with an estimated expenditure of 464 lakhs. The area of the park is 120 acres and the mountain range is 1 km long. The park was opened on 3 October 2018.

== Facilities ==
- Children Park
- Swing Bridges
- Cross Mount
- Hall
- Restaurant
- Cottages

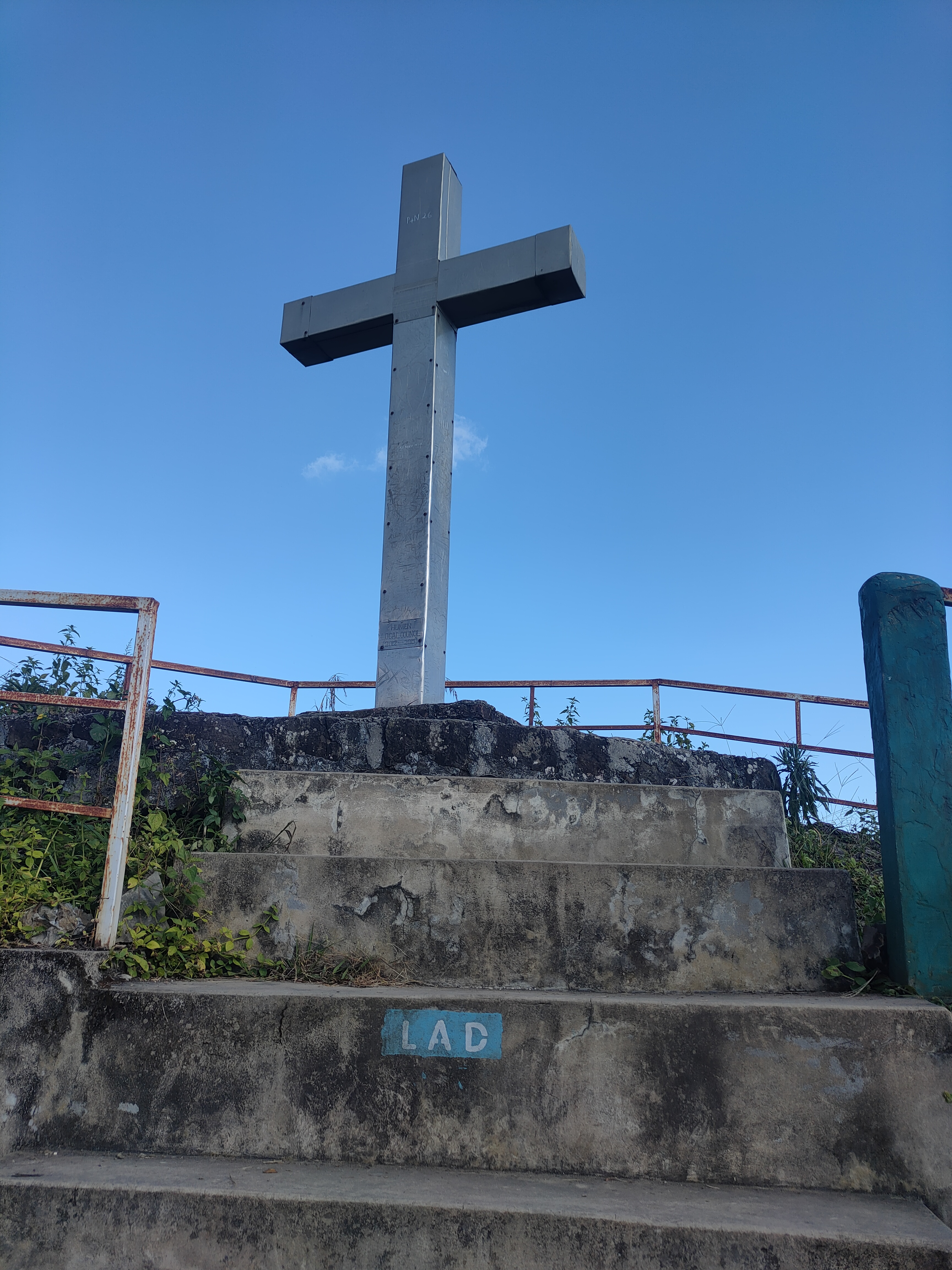
Cross Mount

== See also ==
- Phawngpui National Park
- List of national parks of India
