= Tuirini =

Tuirini River
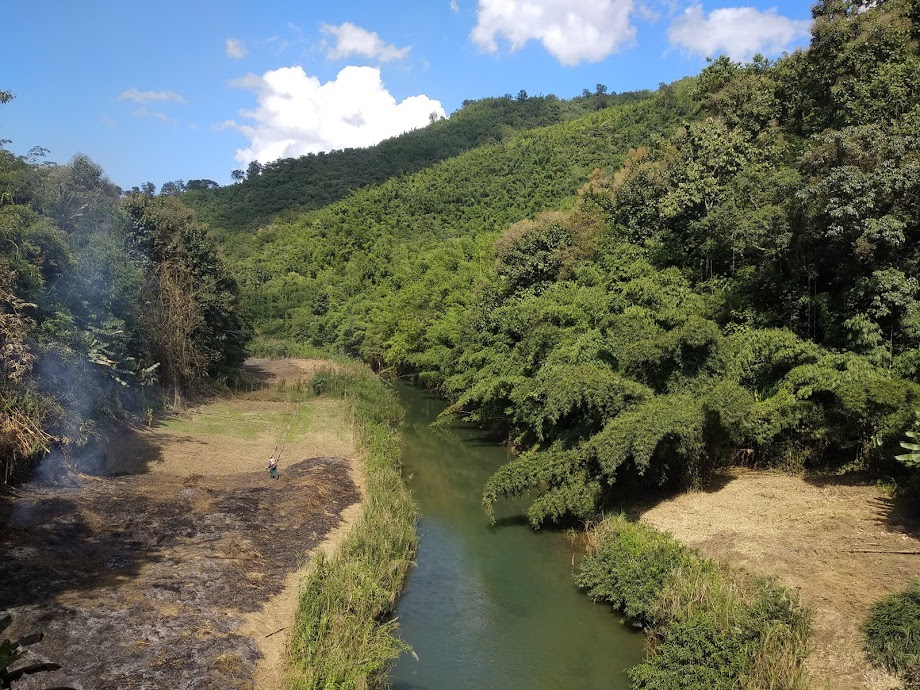
- The Tuirini c. 2018

Location
- Country: India
- State: Mizoram, Assam
- Cities: Aizawl, Lunglei

Physical characteristics
- Source
  - elevation: 1,060 m (3,480 ft)
- Mouth
  - location: Hmangkawn
  - elevation: 1,060 m (3,480 ft)
- Length: 54.5 km (33.9 mi)

The Tuirini is a river of Mizoram, northeastern India. The river is about 54.5 kilometres (33.9 mi) long. It originates from Hmangkawn Village in Aizawl District. It flows northward to join the Tuirial River Northwest of Seling. It is about 55 km from Aizawl. As of 2018, a 42 MW Hydel project is being planned in Tuirini River.
