= Biate (town) =

Biate Zialung(older name)
- city
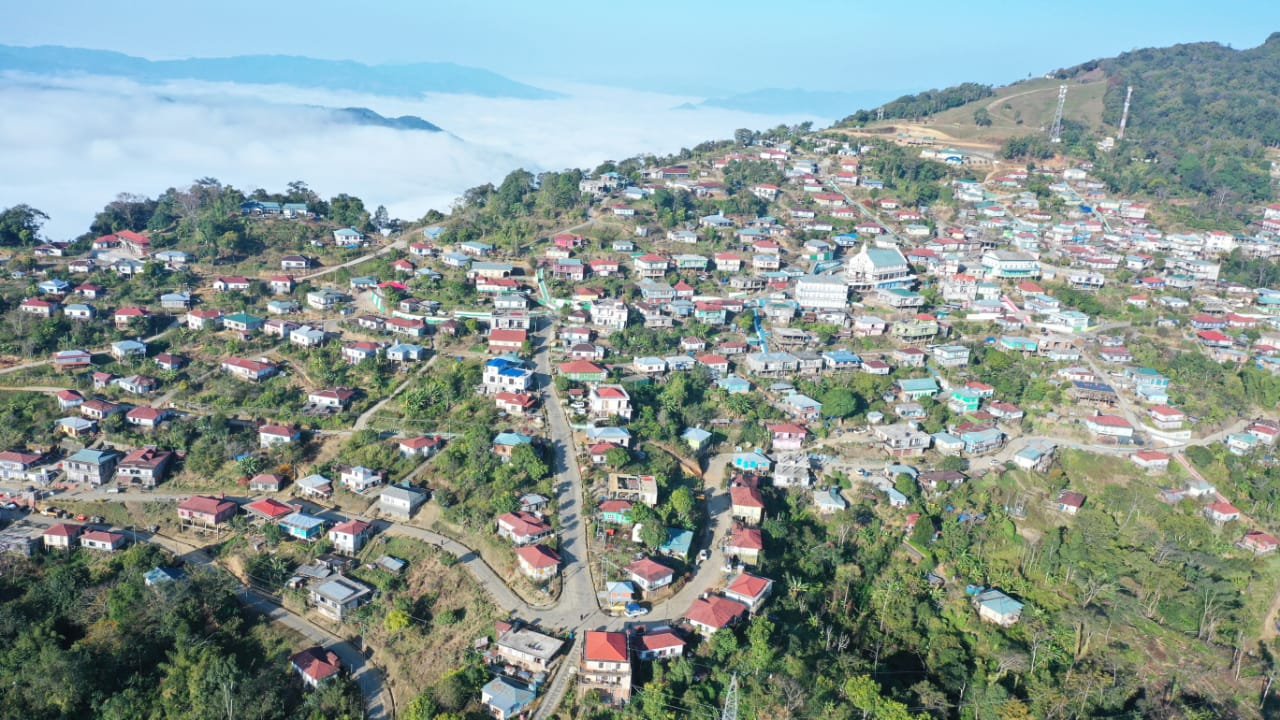

- Location within Mizoram Location within India
- Coordinates: 23.268°N 93.0981°E
- Country: India
- State: Mizoram
- District: Khawzawl

Population (2011)
  - Total: 2,277

Languages
  - Official: Mizo
- Time zone: UTC+5:30 (IST)
- Postal code: 796370
- Vehicle registration: MZ
- Website: mizoram.nic.in

Biate is a census town in Khawzawl district in the state of Mizoram, India. Biate town has been selected as the cleanest town in Mizoram and Northeast. Biate is one of the oldest human settlement in Mizoram, inhabited since the 1780s and was then known as Zialung.

== Biate town Awards ==
- Cleanest town in Mizoram under Swachh Bharat Mission from 2017 to 2021. Mizo Children's Association (MCA) was formed in Biate, which took the initiative of cleanliness drive in Biate. Members of the association would make use of their time to clean the streets once in a week.
- Open Defecation-Free town in 2016.
- Best City in Citizens Feedback 2021. Biate's mission to stay clean had started decades before the Swachchh Bharat campaign kicked off by Prime Minister Narendra Modi in 2014.
- Best city" award under Innovation and Best Practices – Northeast zone in the Swachh Survekshan 2018*

== History ==
Biate town was started by Mizo chief Kairuma Sailo in 1900.

== Demographics ==
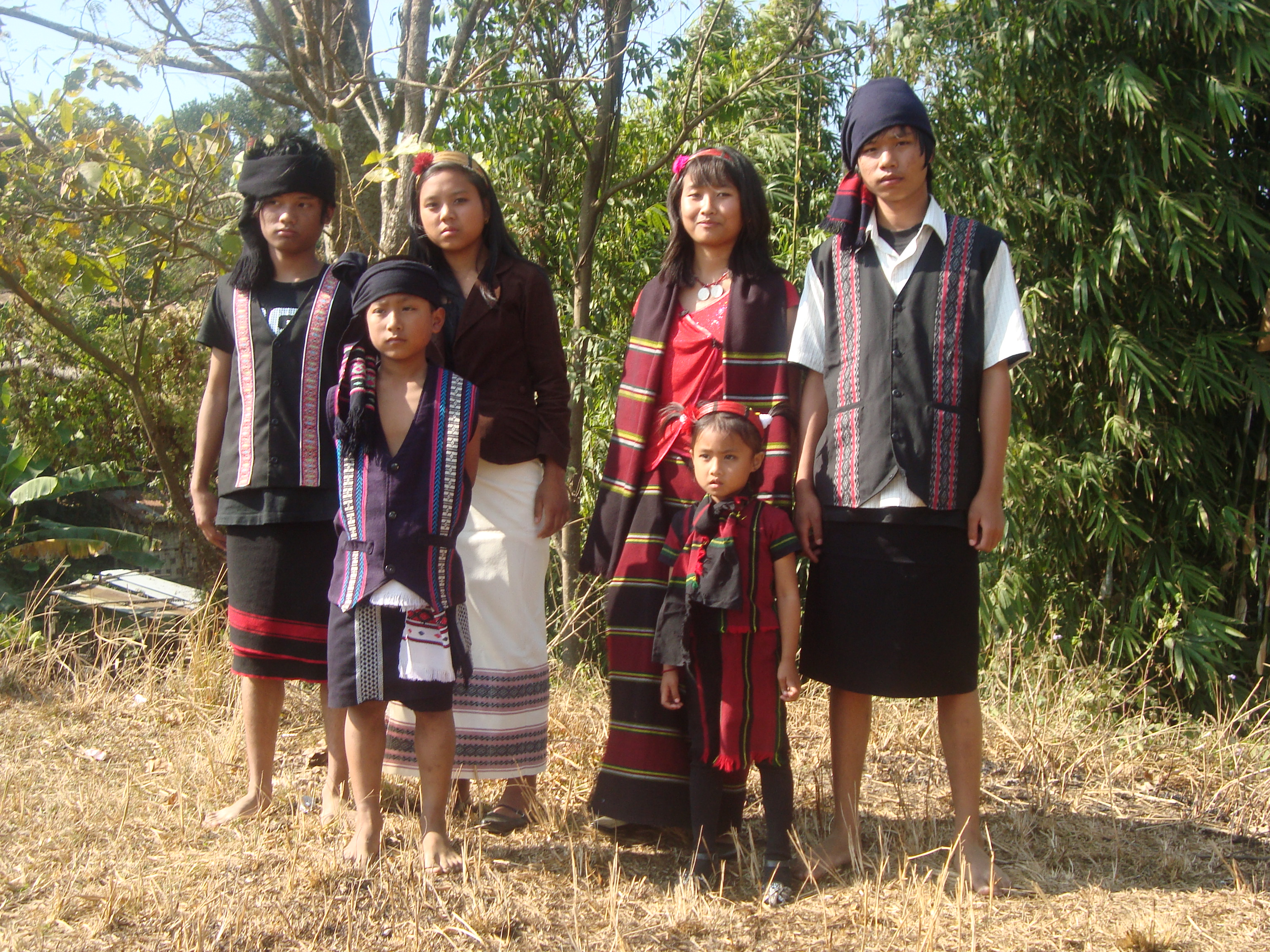
Traditional dress

As of the 2011 India census, Biate had a population of 2277.
