= Khawhai =

Khawhai Haikhawpui
- city
- Location within Mizoram Location within India
- Coordinates: 23.37°N 93.12°E
- Country: India
- State: Mizoram
- District: Champhai
- Elevation: 1,369 m (4,491 ft)

Population (2001)
  - Total: 2,408

Languages
  - Official: Mizo
- Time zone: UTC+5:30 (IST)
- Vehicle registration: MZ
- Climate: Cwb
- Website: mizoram.nic.in

Khawhai is a census town in Khawzawl district in the Indian state of Mizoram.

== Geography ==
Khawhai is located at 23.37°N 93.12°E.

== Demographics ==
As of 2001 India census, Khawhai had a population of 2408.
