= National Institute of Technology, Mizoram =

Engineering institution in Mizoram, India

- Other name: NITMZ
- Motto: Knowledge is the Ultimate Goal
- Type: Public
- Established: 2010; 16 years ago
- Affiliations: NIT
- Endowment: Ministry of Human Resource Development, Government of India
- Chairperson: Harshavardhan Neotia
- Director: S. Sundar
- Academic staff: 100
- Students: 850
- Location: Aizawl, Mizoram, 796012, India; 23.748°N 92.726°E
- Campus: Urban
- Website: www.nitmz.ac.in

National Institute of Technology Mizoram (NIT Mizoram, or NITMZ) is one of the 31 National Institutes of Technology in India. Located in Aizawl, NIT Mizoram was one of the ten new NITs established by the Ministry of Human Resources Development (part of the Government of India, via order no. F. 23-13-2009-TS-III, dated 30 October 2009 and 3 March 2010).

The primary objective of NIT Mizoram is to provide education through research and training in undergraduate and graduate programs including PhD. The school was declared an "Institute of National Importance" by the Indian Parliament. Students are admitted through the All India Entrance Exam - Joint Entrance Exam (JEE Main).

== History ==
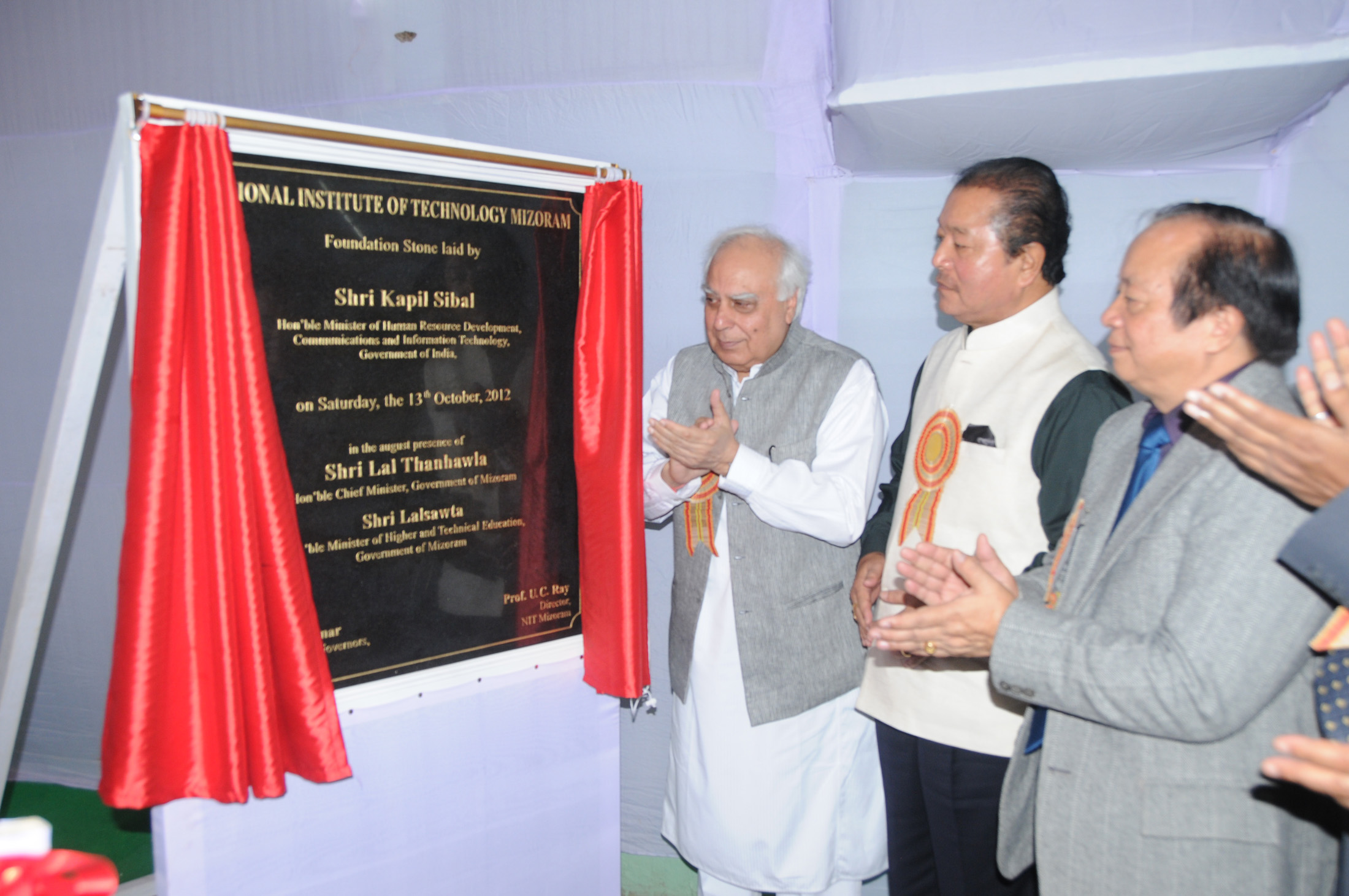
Kapil Sibal laid the foundation of the campus of NIT Mizoram in 2012

The institute was established in 2010, with bachelor's programs in Computer Science & Engineering, Electronics & Communication Engineering and Electrical & Electronics Engineering. Classes began in 2010 at the Visvesvaraya National Institute of Technology, Nagpur and shifted to Aizawl in 2011. Classes operate from Dawrkawn, Chaltlang locality of Aizawl. The foundation stone of the NIT Mizoram Lengpui Campus was laid by Kapil Sibal, Minister of Human Resource Development on 13 October 2012. The Department of Mechanical Engineering and Civil Engineering programs followed in 2013.

== Campus ==
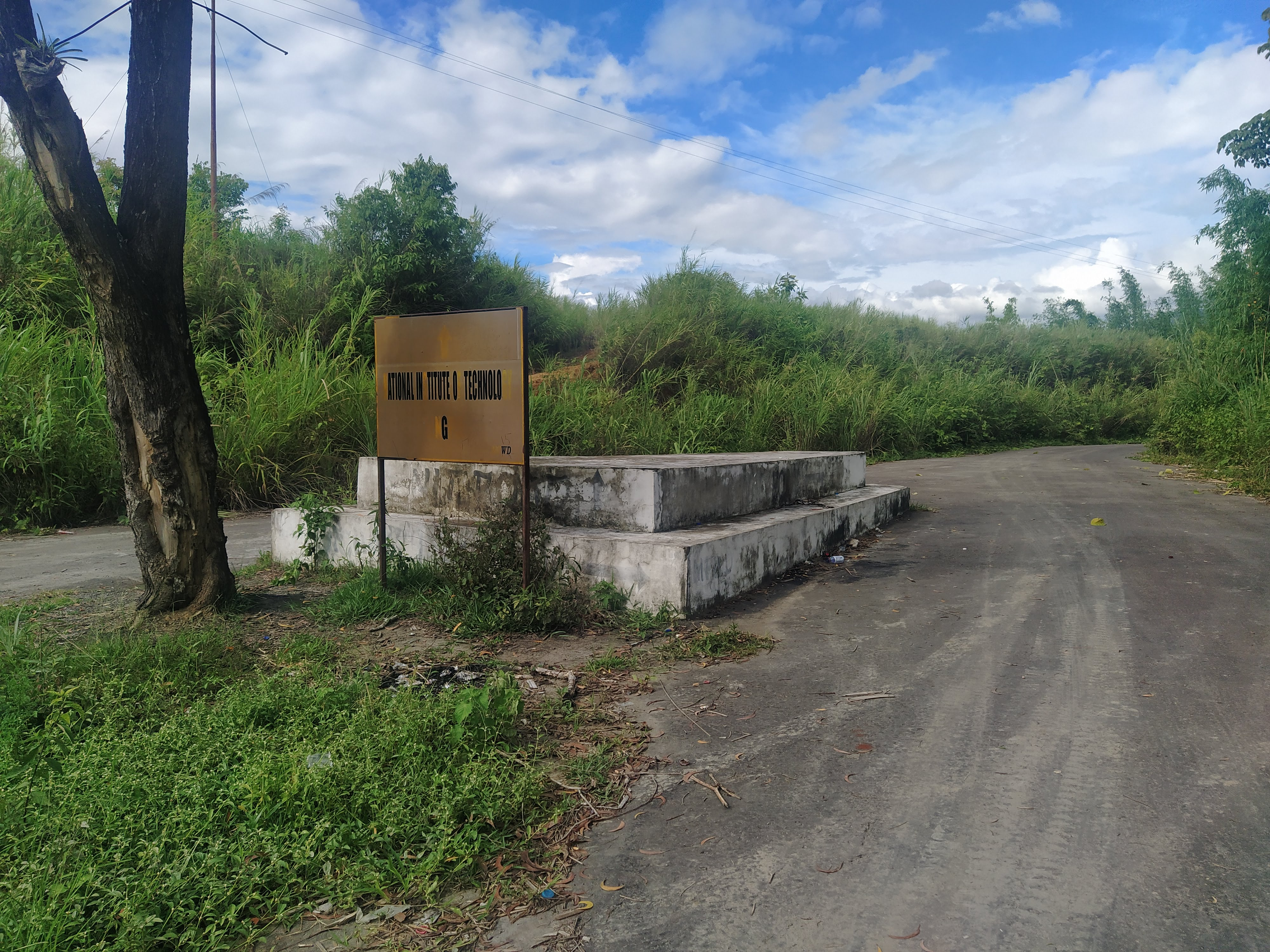
NIT Mizoram Lengui Campus

The NIT Mizoram campus was initially planned to be built in Thenzawl by the Chief Minister of Mizoram, Pu Lalthanhawla. It was later moved to a site located near Lengpui Airport, close to Aizawl, the capital of Mizoram. The Institute functions at a temporary campus in Aizawl. It consists of one administrative block and four academic blocks at Chaltlang, three hostel blocks at Tanhril and one hostel block at Durtlang. The permanent campus is located at Lengpui, Aizawl district. The total demarcated land area is 190 acres (77 ha). The Project proposal for the construction of campus is still under approval from Ministry of Human Resource.

== Departments ==
- Chemical Engineering
- Chemistry
- Civil Engineering
- Computer Science and Engineering
- Electronics and Communication Engineering
- Electrical Engineering
- Mechanical Engineering
- Mathematics
- Mathematics & Computing Engineering
- Physics
- Humanities and Social Science.

== Ranking ==
University rankings

Engineering – India
- NIRF (2024): 130

== Activities ==
The Institute organizes three festivals each year: the Morphosis Technical Festival, the Annunad Cultural Festival, and the Shaurya Sports Festival.
