= Politics of Mizoram =

Indian state politics

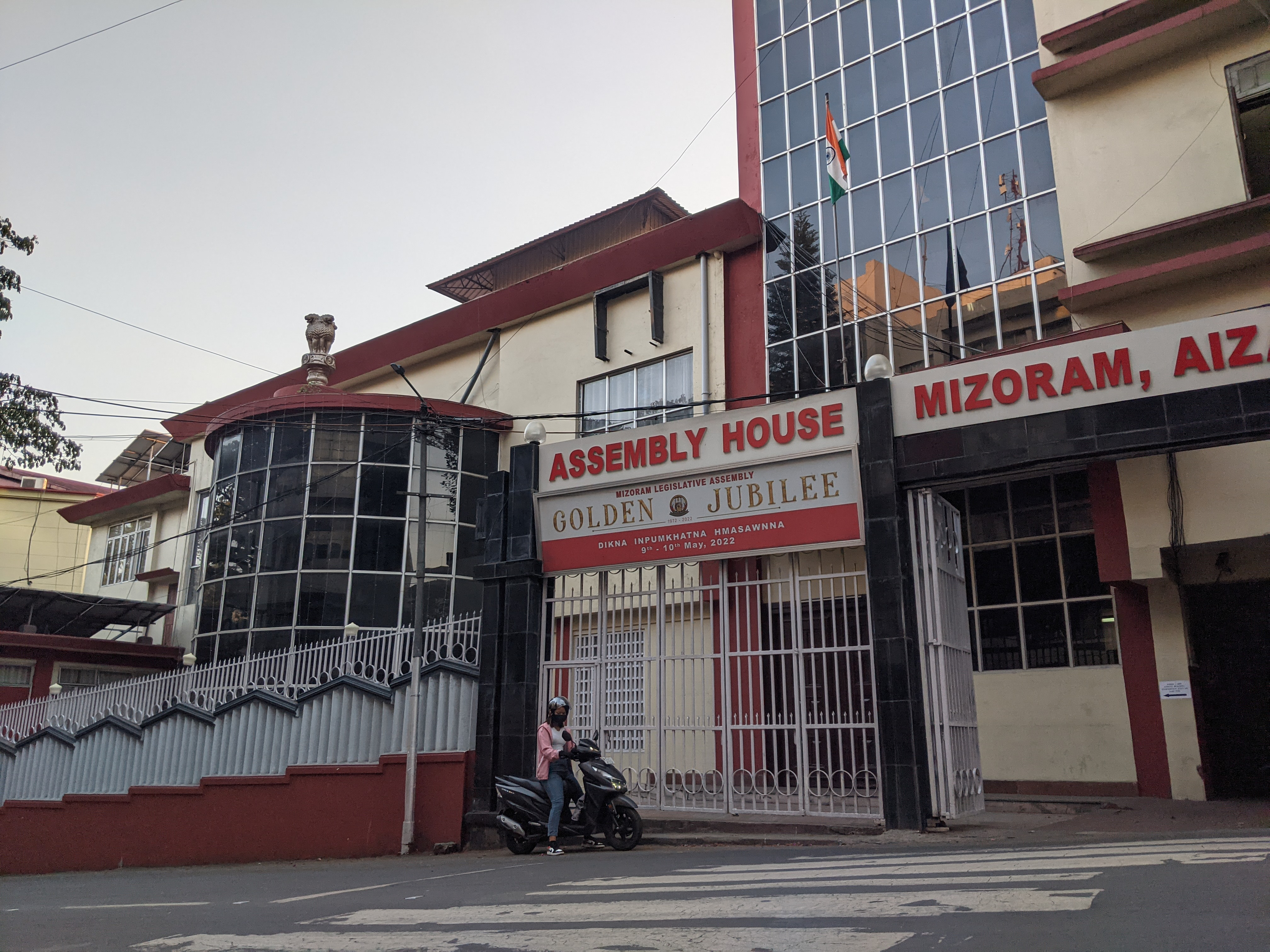
The Mizoram Assembly House in Aizawl, seat of the state legislative assembly

Politics in Mizoram, a state in Northeast India had been dominated by the Mizo National Front and the Zoram People's Movement. As of 2024, the Zoram People's Movement is the ruling party in the states's legislative assembly. ZPM is a coalition of six regional parties that came together in 2018 and came to power in 2024. Bharatiya Janata Party and Indian National Congress are also major political parties in the state.

== Constituencies ==
Mizoram sends one representatives to the Lok Sabha (the lower house of the parliament of India) and one representative to the Rajya Sabha (parliament's upper house).

== Election result ==
The state has 40 assembly seats. The main political parties are the Mizo National Front, Bharatiya Janata Party, Indian National Congress and the Zoram People's Movement. The 2023 assembly election resulted in loss for the Mizo National Front. The Zoram People's Movement won an overall majority in the state. Zoram People's Movement won 27 out of 40 seats in the Assembly. It defeated the MNF, which won the elections in 2018.

== See also ==
- Mizoram Secular Force
