= Zawlnuam =

- Census town
- Location within Mizoram Location within India
- Coordinates: 24.1269700°N 92.3448500°E
- Country: India
- State: Mizoram
- District: Mamit

Population (2011)
  - Total: 3,733

Languages
  - Official: Mizo
- Time zone: UTC+5:30 (IST)
- Vehicle registration: MZ
- Website: mizoram.nic.in

Zawlnuam is a census town in Mamit district in the Indian state of Mizoram.

== Transport ==
The Distance between Zawlnuam and Aizawl is 176 km and is connected with regular service of Maxicabs.

== Education ==
There is Zawlnuam College, under Mizoram University and a number of public and private schools.
