= North Vanlaiphai =

- town
- Location within Mizoram Location within India
- Coordinates: 23°07′56″N 93°03′43″E
- Country: India
- State: Mizoram
- District: Serchhip
- Taluk: East Lungdar

Population (2011)
  - Total: 3,602

Languages
  - Official: Mizo
- Time zone: UTC+5:30 (IST)
- Vehicle registration: MZ
- Website: mizoram.nic.in

North Vanlaiphai is a census town in East Lungdar Taluk in the Indian state of Mizoram. In the 2001 census it was listed in Serchhip District; however in the 2011 census it was listed in Champhai District.

== Demographics ==
As of 2001 India census, North Vanlaiphai had a population of 3,275. Males constitute 51% of the population and females 49%. North Vanlaiphai has an average literacy rate of 84%, higher than the national average of 59.5%: male literacy is 84%, and female literacy is also 84%. 14% of the population is under 6 years of age. By the 2011 census the population had increased to 3,602.

== Economy ==
Vanlaiphai has a flatland measuring 10 kilometers long and 0.8 kilometers in width for rice cultivation. North Vanlaiphai also has a Maicham Small Hydro Project Phase 2 producing 3 MW of power which is about 20 kilometers from Vanlaiphai. Tourism is also being promoted and a Tourist Lodge has been constructed by the Mizoram Government.
