= Tuirial =

Tuirial River

Location
- Country: India
- State: Mizoram, Assam
- Cities: Aizawl, Lunglei, Sonai

Physical characteristics
- Source
  - elevation: 1,398 m (4,587 ft)
- Mouth
  - location: Chawilung hills
- Length: 117 km (73 mi)

Basin features
- Tributaries
  - left: Tuirini

The Tuirial is a river of Mizoram and Assam, northeastern India. It is also known as River Sonai, a tributary of Barak River. It flows in a northerly direction towards Cachar district and joins the Barak River at Dungripar Village near Sonai town. It is impounded by the Tuirial Dam.

== Geography ==
The river is about 117 kilometres (73 mi) long. It originates from Chawilung hills (62 km from Aizawl) in Aizawl District. It flows northward to join the Barak River in Assam.
