= Hmuifang =

Mountain in India

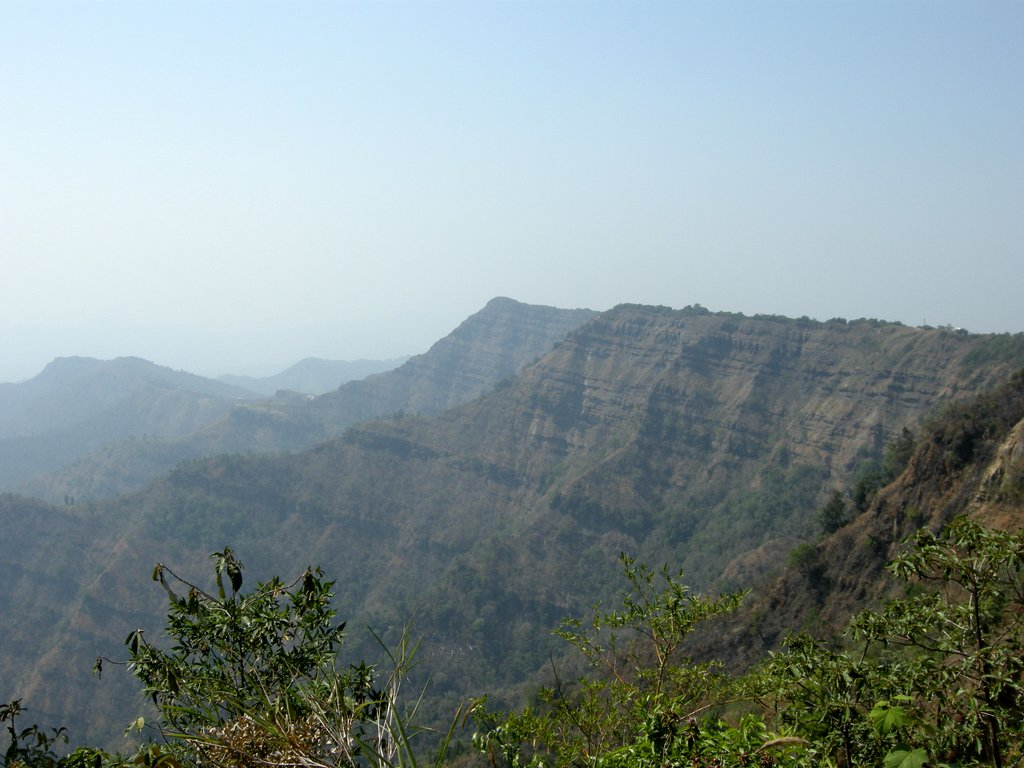
- Hmuifang Mountainside

Highest point
- Elevation: 1,619 m (5,312 ft)
- Coordinates: 23°27′00″N 92°45′28″E

Geography
- Location: Aizawl District, Mizoram, India
- Parent range: Lushai Hills

Geology
- Rock age: around 10th BC
- Mountain type: volcanic eruption

Hmuifang is a tourist spot about 50 km from Aizawl, Mizoram, India. With an elevation of 1,619 metres, the mountain is covered with forest reserves since all the Mizo Chief's time.

== History ==
Hmuifang Tourist resort has been built right on the former land of Lallianvunga the erstwhile chief who used to rule over the villages in the mountain. Hmuifang is also the source of Tuirial River.

== Thalfavang Kut ==
Thalfavang Kut, a Mizo festival is being regularly being held in Hmuifang organized the Tourism Department of Mizoram to promote Tourism. Different Mizo dances like Cheraw, Sawlakai, Siktuithiang lam and Chheihlam are showcased in the festival.

== See also ==
Tourism in Mizoram
