= Tuirial Dam =

Turial Dam
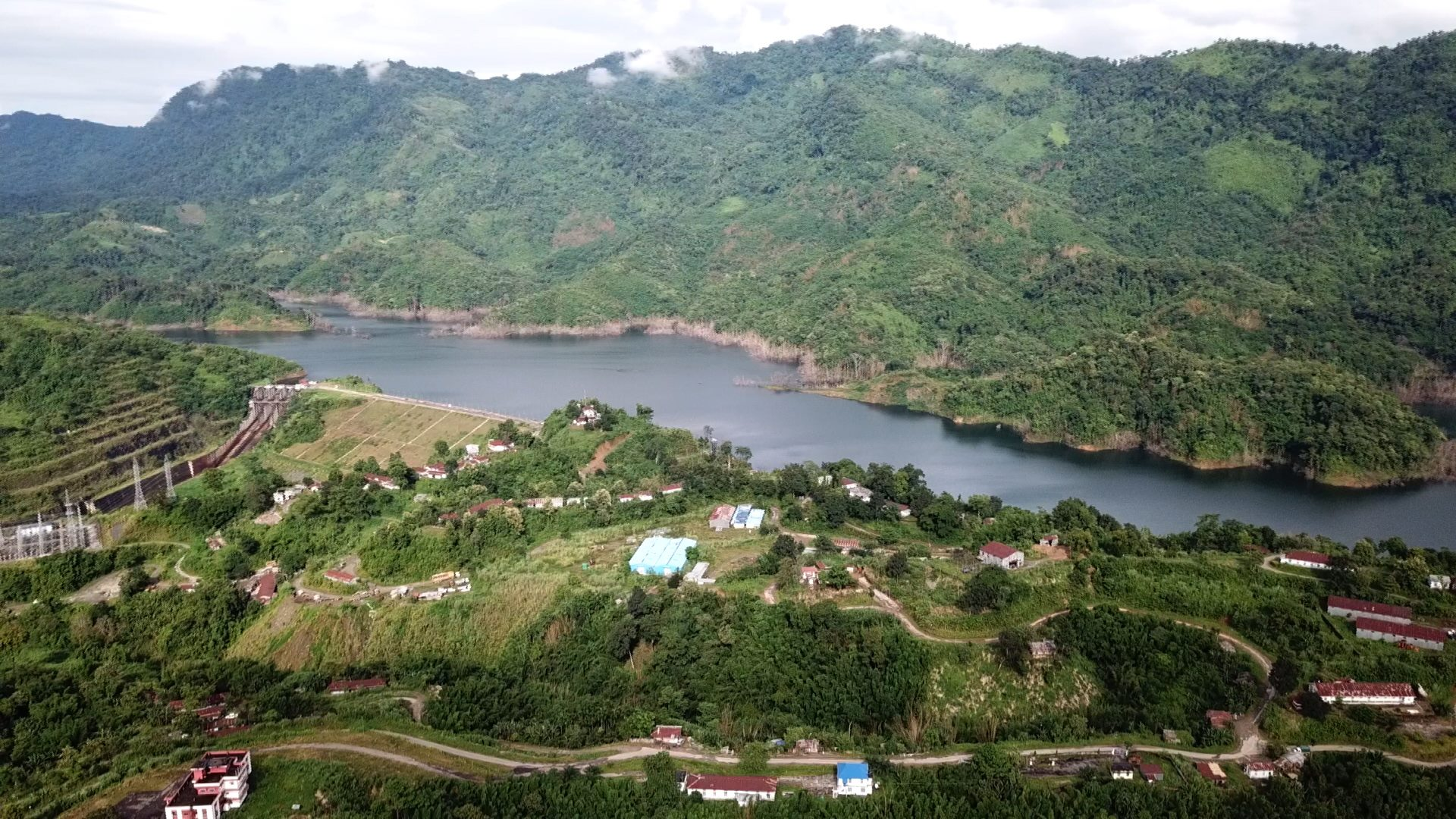
- Tuirial dam

- Location within India
- Country: India
- Location: Tuirial
- Coordinates: 24°21′23.41″N 92°53′09.69″E
- Construction began: 1998
- Opening date: 2017

Dam and spillways
- Type of dam: Embankment, earth-fill
- Impounds: Tuirial River also known as River Sonai
- Height: 74 m (243 ft)
- Length: 700 m (2,297 ft)

Reservoir
- Catchment area: 1860 km

Power Station
- Commission date: 2016-2017 (est.)
- Turbines: 2 x 30 MW Francis-type
- Installed capacity: 60 MW

Tuirial dam is an earthfill and gravity dam on the River Sonai near Kolasib in the state of Mizoram in India. The primary purpose of the dam is hydroelectric power production. The Cabinet Committee on Economic Affairs (CCEA) approved the 60 MW Tuirial Hydro Electric Project (THEP) project costing Rs 913 crore in 2010. The project was inaugurated by Prime Minister Narendra Modi (using a remote control from AR Ground) on 16 December 2017.

== Technical Features ==
Tuirial Hydel Project is the 2nd largest earthen dam and the largest in India. The height of the dam is 75 Metres. The dam has 3 split gates, 2 Turbine and 2 tunnel. Tuirial Hydel Dam has two 30MW Francis Turbine. The dam is estimated to produce 250 million units of electrical energy every year.

== History ==
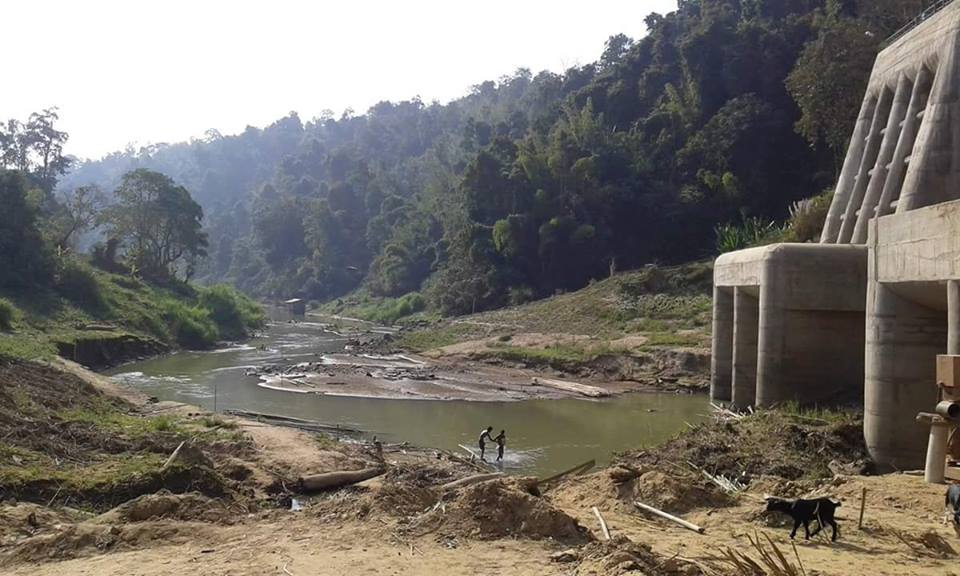
River diversion tunnels

Construction of 60 MW hydroelectric power station began in 1998 by NEEPCO but was halted in 2004 by the Tuirial Crop Compensation Claimant Association of which the Mizo National Front then Chief Minister Pu Zoramthanga's relatives figured among nine people named in Central Bureau of Investigation charge sheet. When Pu Lalthanhawla, who had started the project came back in power, he took initiatives to restart the project. The Cabinet Committee on Economic Affairs (CCEA) approved the 60 MW Tuirial Hydro Electric Project (THEP) project costing Rs 913 crore in 2010.
