= Lushai Hills =

Mountain range in North East India

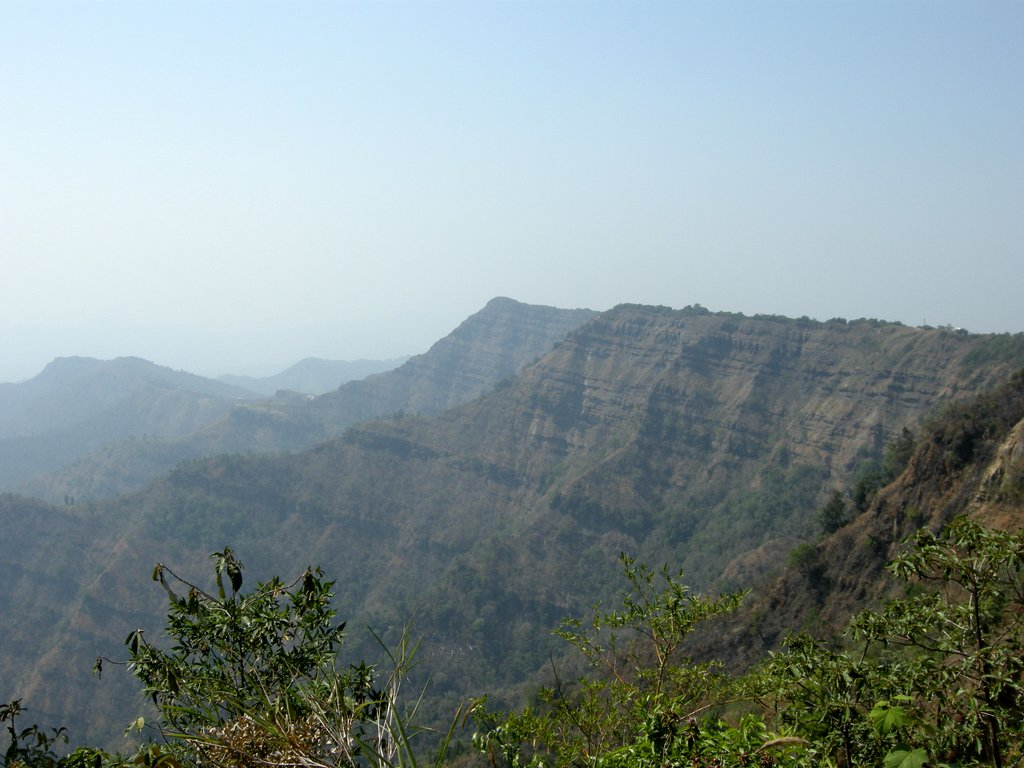
- Hmuifang mountainside

Highest point
- Peak: Phawngpui
- Elevation: 2,157 m (7,077 ft)
- Coordinates: 23°10′N 92°50′E

Geography
- Location within India
- Country: India
- States: Mizoram and Tripura
- Parent range: Patkai Range

The Lushai Hills (Pron: ˌlʊˈʃaɪ, now called Mizo Hills) form a hilly region in the Patkai-Arakan Yoma mountain range system in Northeast India, in the present-day state of Mizoram.

== Geography ==
The highest peak rising to an elevation of 2,157 metres (7,077 ft) at Phawngpui, also known as 'Blue Mountain'.

== Flora and fauna ==
The hills are for the most part covered with dense bamboo jungle and rank undergrowth; but in the eastern portion, owing probably to a smaller rainfall, open grass-covered slopes are found, with groves of oak and pine interspersed with rhododendrons. The Blue Mountain is the highest peak in Lushai hills.

== Inhabitants ==
The Lushai Hills, now known as Mizoram, has a long history of hosting various tribal communities. The Mizo people have been the largest and most prominent among them.

In addition to the Mizo community, the southern areas of the Lushai Hills are inhabited by the Chakma people.

== Bibliography ==
- T. H. Lewin, Wild Races of N.E. India (1870)
- Lushai Hills Gazetteer (Calcutta, 1906)
