= Vantawng Falls =

Waterfall in Mizoram, India

Vantawng Khawhthla
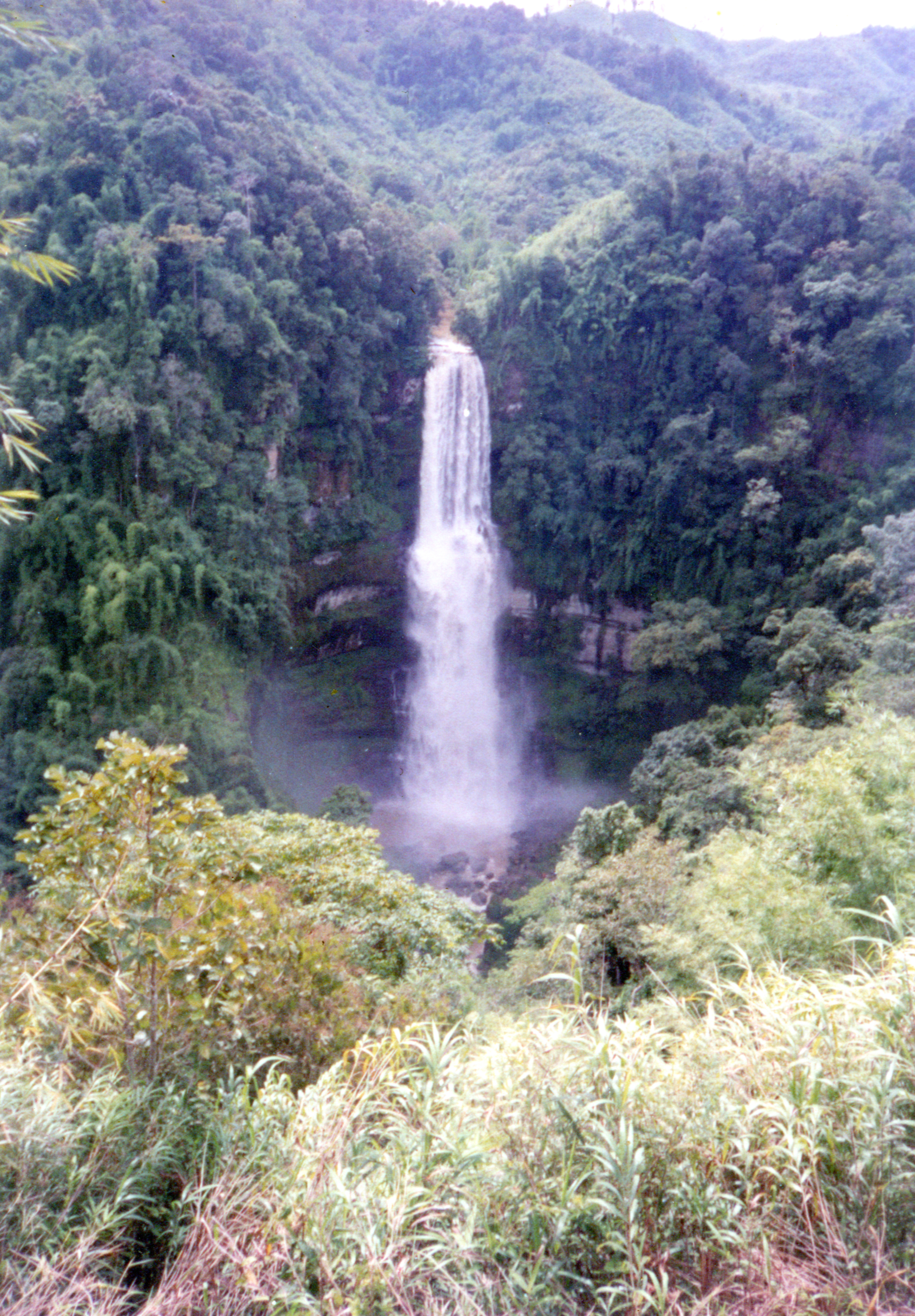
- Vantawng Khawhthla

- Location within Mizoram Location within India
- Location: Serchhip district, Mizoram, India
- Coordinates: 23°15′25″N 92°45′45″E
- Type: Tiered
- Total height: 230 m (750 ft)
- Watercourse: Vanva River

The Vantawng Khawhthla is located 5 kilometres (3.1 mi) south of Thenzawl in Serchhip district in the Indian state of Mizoram. It is the highest uninterrupted waterfall in Mizoram. It is about 92 kilometres (57 miles) away from Aizawl.

== The falls ==
Vantawng Khawhthla or Vantawng Falls is the highest and most spectacular of the waterfalls and cascades in the fast-flowing rivers of Mizoram. It is located in Vanva River near Thenzawl and is named after Vantawnga, who was said to be an excellent swimmer. So good a swimmer was Vantawnga that he could hover in the cascading water like a fish, but during one of such performances, a drifting log fell from above and killed him.

The height of the fall is recorded as 750 feet (230 m). Though it is difficult to get close to it because of the sheer forested hillsides surrounding it, a viewing tower has been constructed.

== See also ==
- List of waterfalls
- List of waterfalls in India
- List of waterfalls in India by height
- Tourism in Mizoram
