= Serchhip district =

- District of Mizoram
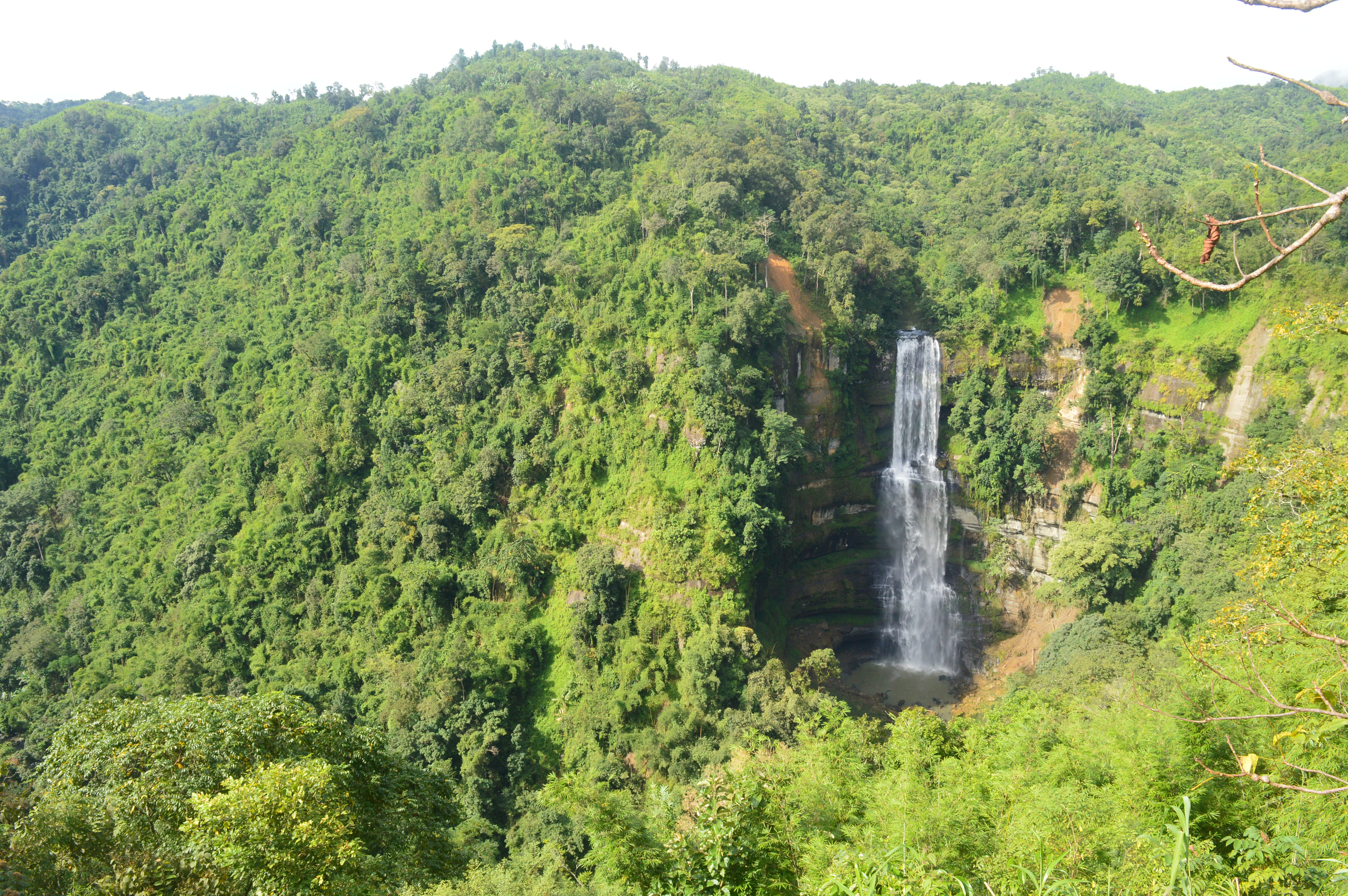
- Vantawng Falls

- Location in Mizoram
- Interactive map of Serchhip district
- Coordinates (Serchhip): 23°17′N 92°55′E
- Country: India
- State: Mizoram
- Headquarters: Serchhip

Government
  - Lok Sabha constituencies: Mizoram
  - Vidhan Sabha constituencies: 3

Area
  - Total: 1,422 km^{2} (549 sq mi)

Population (2011)
  - Total: 64,937
  - Density: 45.67/km^{2} (118.3/sq mi)

Demographics
  - Literacy: 97.91%
  - Sex ratio: 977 per thousand
- Time zone: UTC+05:30 (IST)
- Website: serchhip.nic.in

Serchhip district is one of the eleven districts of Mizoram state in India. The district occupies an area of 1421.60 km^{2}. Serchhip town is the administrative headquarters of the district. This district came into existence on 15 September 1998, being carved out of the larger Aizawl District. Because of the way it was created it includes part of East Lungdar Tehsil and part of Thingsulthliah Tehsil.

As of 2011 census, it has the highest literacy rate in India, and is the second least populous district of Mizoram (out of eight), after Saiha.

== Geography ==
The district is bounded on the north and northwest by Aizawl District, on the west and south by Lunglei District, on the southeast by Myanmar (Burma), and on the east by Champhai District.

The district is mostly a hilly terrain with some alluvial benches along its rivers that are utilised for agriculture. Serchhip District lies between the Mat River and the Tuikum River. The Tuikum is utilised for public drinking water for the town of Serchhip and the Mat provides irrigation water to Zawlpui, considered the "rice bowl" of Serchhip. Vantawng Falls, the highest waterfall in Mizoram, is located in the district about 5 kilometres (3.1 mi) south of the town of Thenzawl on the Lau River.

With an average elevation of 888 metres (2,913 ft), the average annual daily temperature ranges from 15 °C to 27 °C and the rainfall is moderate.

== Administration and divisions ==
The district is administered by a deputy commissioner whose office is in the town of Serchhip. There are three sub-divisions (townships or tehsils), Serchhip Sadar, North Vanlaiphai and Thenzawl, with forty-one villages.

There are three legislative assembly constituencies in this district: Tuikum, Hrangturzo and Serchhip. Three villages in Aizawl District are included in Tuikum Constituency, namely Darlawng, Phulmawi and Tlungvel. Hrangturzo Constituency includes the town of Biate which is located in Champhai District.

== Demographics ==
Historical population
Year	Pop.	±% p.a.
1971	34,381	—
1981	37,803	+0.95%
1991	46,222	+2.03%
2001	54,460	+1.65%
2011	64,937	+1.78%

Religions in Serchhip district (2011)
Religion	Percent
Christianity	97.70%
Hinduism	1.53%
Islam	0.52%
Other or not stated	0.25%

According to the 2011 census Serchhip district has a population of 64,937, roughly equal to that of the Marshall Islands. This gives it a ranking of 626th in India (out of a total of 640). Approximately a third of the population live in and around the town of Serchhip. The district has a population density of 46 inhabitants per square kilometre (120/sq mi). Its population growth rate over the decade 2001–2011 was 20.56%. Serchhip has a sex ratio of 977 females for every 1000 males, and a literacy rate of 97.91%. 49.31% of the population lives in urban areas. Scheduled Tribes make up 96.85% of the population. Most of the population is engaged in agricultural pursuits.

Mizo is the predominant language, spoken by 97.75% of the population as their first language.

== Flora and fauna ==
In 1991 the area became home to the Khawnglung Wildlife Sanctuary, which has an area of 35 km^{2}.
