= Thenzawl =

- Town
- Location within Mizoram Location within India
- Coordinates: 23.32°N 92.75°E
- Country: India
- State: Mizoram
- District: Serchhip
- Elevation: 783 m (2,569 ft)

Population (June 2021)
  - Total: 21,158

Languages
  - Official: Mizo
- Time zone: UTC+5:30 (IST)
- Postal code: 796186
- Vehicle registration: MZ
- Climate: Cwa

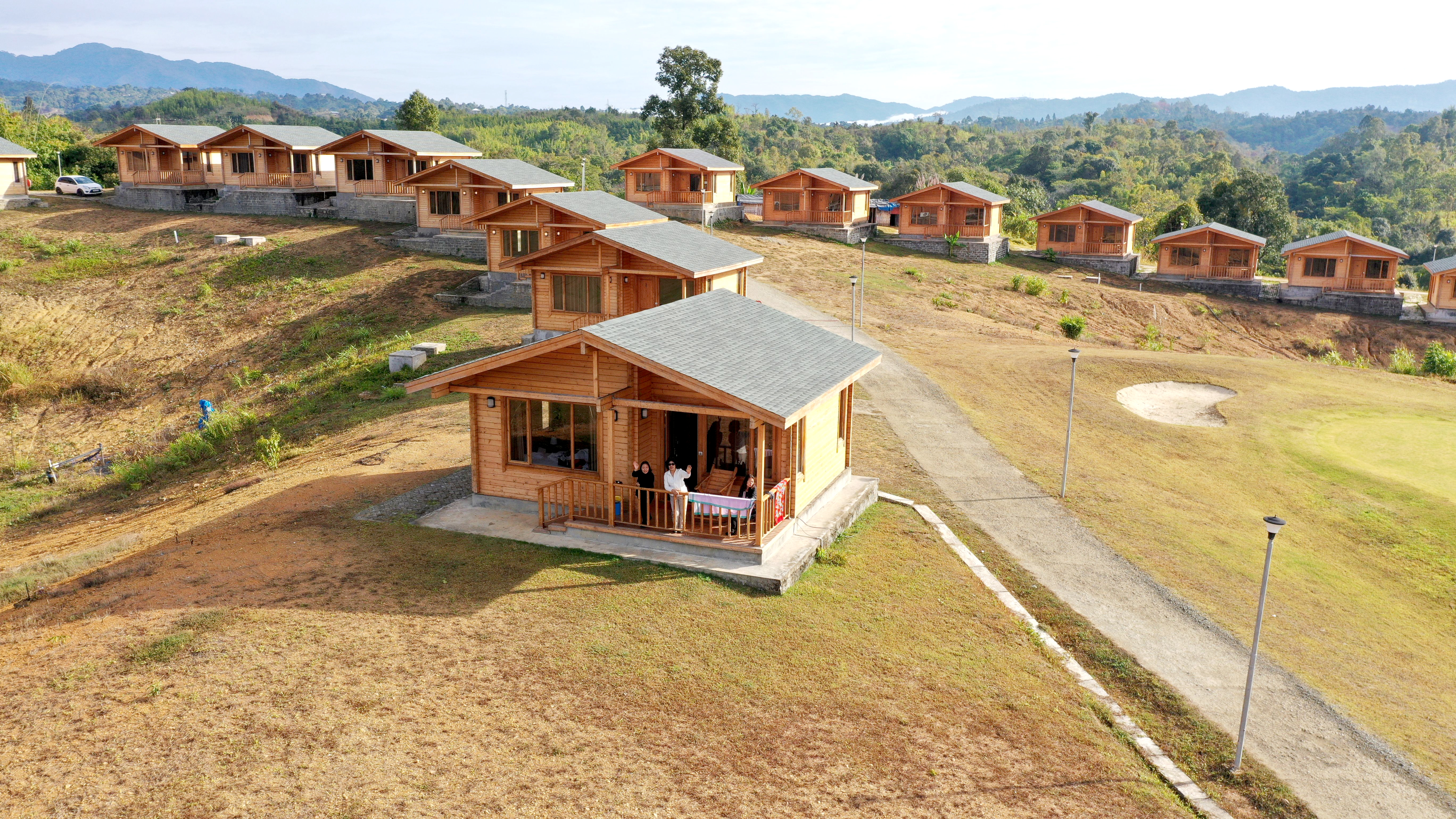
Thenzawl gold course log house

Thenzawl is a census town in Serchhip district in the Indian state of Mizoram. It is a center for the traditional Mizo handloom industry.

== Geography ==
Thenzawl is located at 23.32°N 92.75°E.

== Tourism ==
Tourist sites in the area include:

- Vantawng Falls - located 5 kilometres (3.1 mi) south of Thenzawl.
- Bengkhuaia Thlan - the founder of Thenzawl Bengkhuaia invaded Alexandrapur in 1871 kidnapping Mary Winchester which brought about the British to Mizoram. He died around 1879.
- Vaibiak - the place from where they took back Mary Winchester.
- Chawngchilhi Puk - a cave associated with a love story between a lady and a snake.
- Tuirihiau falls - a beautiful waterfall near Thenzawl, upstream of Vantawng fall.
- Thenzawl Deer Park - has 17 deer (11 female and 6 male) in a natural environment.
- Thenzawl Golf Course and Resort is rated as "one of the best all season Golf courses in the North East India".

== Media ==
The media in Thenzawl includes, Print Media and Visual :

Newspapers

- Vantawng
- Ramlai Post
- Zawlbuk Aw

== See also ==
- Thenzawl Peace City
