= N. Chawnpui =

Village in Mizoram, India

N. Chawnpui N.Chawnpui
- Village
- Location in Mizoram, India N. Chawnpui (India)
- Coordinates: 24.3756°N 92.7817°E
- Country: India
- State: Mizoram
- District: Kolasib
- Block: Bilkhawthlir

Population (2011)
  - Total: 389

Languages
  - Official: Mizo
- Time zone: UTC+5:30 (IST)
- PIN: 796091
- Vehicle registration: MZ

N. Chawnpui is a village in the Kolasib district in Mizoram, India. It is situated in the Bilkhawthlir area of the district. It is served by the N. Chawnpui Branch Post Office with PIN code 796101. At the time of the 2011 Census, the village had a population of 389 people living in 75 households. N. Chawnpui is one of the constituent villages of the Sinlung Hills Council and falls under the Saipum constituency.

== N. Chawnpui village council members (2025-2030) ==
N. Chawnpui village council members (2025-2030)
Position	Name
President	Lalropuia
Vice President	Lalhmingmawia
Secretary	K Lalrammawia
Treasurer	Lalpuntiri

== See also ==
- Saipum
- Saiphai
- Saihapui V
