= Builum Khawhlui =

Builum
- Village
- Location within Mizoram Location within India
- Coordinates: 24°15′20″N 92°44′14″E
- Country: India
- State: Mizoram
- District: Kolasib
- Established: 1941

Government
  - Body: Deputy Commissioner : John LT Sanga

Population (2011 census)
  - Total: 323

Languages
  - Official: Mizo
- Time zone: UTC+5:30 (IST)
- PIN: 796081
- Vehicle registration: MZ 05
- Climate: Cwa
- Website: mizoram.nic.in

Builum is a village in Bilkhawthlir Block of Kolasib district of Mizoram state of India. The village was established in the year 1941, but had to be moved as the construction of Serlui B dam on the Serlui river between 2003 and 2009 submerged the original village. The compensations due to the villagers due to the construction of the Serlui B dam are still ongoing.

== Demographics ==
As per the 2011 Indian Population Census, Builum has population of 323, of which 51.39% are males and 48.61% are females. 22.29% of the total population of the village are children aged 0–6.
