= Buddhism in Mizoram =

Buddhism in the Indian state

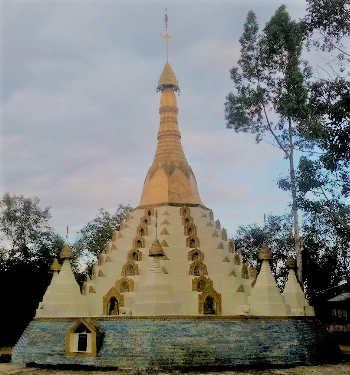
Kamalanagar Buddhist Temple

Buddhism is the second largest religion in the Indian State of Mizoram. It is followed by 8.51% of its population. There are 93411 Buddhists in Mizoram. Most of the Buddhists in Mizoram are Chakmas Most of them live in the autonomous region called Chakma Autonomous District Council and follow the Theravada branch of Buddhism.

== History ==
An archaeological study in 2023 discovered 8th century CE Hindu and Buddhist-influenced sculptures at Kolalian village in the Mamit district.

The Chakma people, who mainly follow Buddhism, have been in the state for centuries. The Chakmas had resided on the region near Tlabung, which was then under the Chittagong Hill Tracts under British Administration. In 1892, Lieutenant Governor of Bengal, Sir Charles Elliot merged Chakma inhabited Demagiri (Tlabung) and the surrounding areas into the Lushai Hills. In the Uiphum Tlangdung region, there was a small population of Chakma. The migration of Chakmas to this region started in 1940s. In 1960s many Chakmas from the Chittagong Hill Tracts of Bangladesh migrated to the Mizoram and other neighbouring Indian states after their lands were submerged by the filling of Kaptai dam and due to the communal violence. Some also migrated to Mizoram to escape from religious persecution in Bangladesh. In 1972, when Mizoram became a State, the Centre government granted the Chakmas tribes autonomy by creating Chakma Autonomous District Council.

== Demographics ==
In 2001 Census, Buddhism constituted 7.93% of the State's population. It increased slightly to 8.51% in the 2011 Census.

About 91.7% or 88,885 Chakmas follows Buddhism.

=== District wise Buddhist Population ===
District	Percent
Aizawl	0.39%
Lawngtlai	43.72%
Saiha	0.18%
Serchhip	0.09%
Mamit	14.27%
Champhai	0.12%
Lunglei	17.06%
Kolasib	0.13%

=== Subdivision wise Buddhist Population ===
Buddhist population by block in Lawngtlai, Lunglei and Mamit districts (Census 2011)
District	Block	Buddhist population	Percentage of total population
Lawngtlai	Chawngte	41,715	92.07%
Lawngtlai	Lawngtlai	3,438	8.88%
Lawngtlai	S. Bungtlang	6,387	37.29%
Lunglei	Lungsen	18,019	46.18%
Lunglei	West Bunghmun	9,219	49.00%
Mamit	Zawlnuam	5,785	12.26%
Mamit	West Phaileng	6,532	30.65%

== See also ==
- Christianity in Mizoram
- Hinduism in Mizoram
- Islam in Mizoram
