= Islam in Mizoram =

Detailed data of Muslims in Mizoram

Islam is a minority religion in Mizoram, a state in northeastern India, where it constitutes approximately 1.35%(14,832) of the total population, according to the 2011 Census. The Muslim community in Mizoram is diverse, with ethnic groups such as the Assamese, Bengali, a small local converts.

== History ==
The advent of Islam in Mizoram dates to the late nineteenth century, when Muslim soldiers serving under the British colonial forces arrived during the Lushai Expedition (1871–1872 and 1889–1890). A number of sepoys who accompanied the expeditionary troops were of Muslim background, marking the first recorded presence of Islam in the region.

Although their numbers remained small, the continued military presence, migration of traders from present-day Assam and Bengal, and later government employment contributed to the gradual settlement of Muslims in Mizoram throughout the twentieth century. The population of the community expanded slowly but consistently, forming small clusters across what became the districts of the modern state.

== Culture ==
Muslims in Mizoram celebrate Eid al-Fitr at the high school ground in Zarkawt, Aizawl, which is 15 minutes away from the Aijwal Mosque. (Note: The Aijal Mosque, established in 1909, is the only mosque in Aizawl and the oldest mosque in Mizoram) The ground is near a church, showing harmony between the Christians and Muslims of Mizoram.

Quran is also Translated in Mizo languages.

== Demographics ==
Muslim Population in Mizoram
Year	(Pop.)	(%)
1901	202	
1951	~1,200	~0.6
1961	~1,500	~0.6
1971	1882	0.40
1981	2,205	0.45
1991	4,538	0.66
2001	10,099	1.01
2011	14,832	1.35

=== Community ===
The Significant population of muslims in Mizoram are Bengali, Pangals, Assamese and some tribal converts. They live in northern Mizoram districts of Kolasib and Mamit where there are five mosques.

There is also small community of khasi and Chakma, who follow Islam.

==== Tribal Muslims ====
Islam among social group of Mizoram, 2011 census
1. Scheduled Tribes (29.0%)
2. other Muslims (71.0%)

Muslima among Tribe Groups
Tribe Name	Total Muslims
Chakma	183
Dimasa Kachari	99
Garo	20
Hmar	142
Any Kuki Tribes	205
Any Naga tribes	27
Any Mizo (Lushai) tribes	3,168
Pawi	158
Paite	109
Generic Tribes etc.	65
All Schedule Tribes	4,209

=== Distribution ===
District	Percent	Popul.
Aizawl	1.31%	5,177
Champhai	0.56%	483
Kolasib	5.27%	4,426
Lawngtlai	0.44%	552
Lunglei	0.80%	1,164
Mamit	2.06%	1,782
Saiha	0.91%	514
Serchhip	0.52%	335

=== Education ===
According to the 2011 Census of India, Muslims in Mizoram had a literacy rate of 81.70%, which was significantly higher than the national Muslim literacy average of 57.28%. The community also recorded a comparatively high proportion of graduates and above (3.93%), reflecting relatively better educational attainment among Muslims in the state.

Educational level of Muslims in Mizoram (Population age 7 and above)
Education	Mizoram	Muslims	
Education	Mizoram	In no.	(%)
Illiterate	228,110	2,174	14.65%
Literate	805,418	12,118	81.70%
Graduate and above	73,541	584	3.93%
Total population	1,033,528	14,832	100%

== Organisations ==
- Mizoram Muslim Welfare Society.
- Aizawl Mosque Committee (AMC).

== See also ==
- Religion in Mizoram
- Buddhism in Mizoram
- Hinduism in Mizoram
- Islam in India
