= Mizoram Co-operative Apex Bank =

Indian co-operative banking company headquartered in Aizawl

- Type: Cooperative
- Industry: Banking
- Founded: 31 July 1982; 44 years ago
- Headquarters: Aizawl, Mizoram, India
- Area served: Mizoram
- Key people: Lalnunsanga (Chairman); A.Lallungmuana (CEO)
- Number of employees: 166
- Website: www.mizoapex.com

The Mizoram Co-operative Apex Bank or Mizoram Apex Bank is an Indian co-operative banking company headquartered in Aizawl. It was incorporated in 1982 as an urban cooperative bank.

== History ==
The bank was established on 31 July 1982, as a state co-operative bank with a share capital of ₹16.53 lakh (equivalent to ₹3.1 crore or US$330,000 in 2023). Mizoram State Rural Livelihood Mission signed a memorandum of understanding with Mizoram Cooperative Apex Bank on 17 February 2018 to help self-help groups.

== Operation ==
The Bank has operations in Siaha, Lawngtlai, Lunglei, Champhai, Serchhip, Kolasib, Mamit, Main Branch, Dawrpui Branch, New Market Branch, Bawngkawn Branch and Cooperative Centenary Branch. The Bank currently has 1037 share-holder cooperative societies with the Government of Mizoram as of 30 September 2013 and has a total staff strength of 166 employees. The Mizoram Cooperative Apex Bank has given loans to over 11,483 people in the state of Mizoram.
