= Saihapui V =

Village in Mizoram, India

- Village
- Interactive map of Saihapui V
- Coordinates: 24°28′43″N 92°47′17″E
- Country: India
- State: Mizoram
- District: Kolasib
- Block: Bilkhawthlir

Population (2011)
  - Total: 368

Languages
  - Official: Mizo
- Time zone: UTC+5:30 (IST)
- PIN: 796101

Saihapui V is a village in the Kolasib district in Mizoram, India. It is situated in the Bilkhawthlir area of the district. Vairengte is the nearest town to Saihapui V. At the time of the 2011 Census, the village had a population of 368 people living in 63 households. Saihapui V is one of the constituent villages of the Sinlung Hills Council and falls under the Saiphai constituency.

== Saihapui V village council members (2025-2030) ==
Saihapui V village council members (2025-2030)
Position	Name
President	Vanlalzawna
Vice President	Lalsangliana
Secretary	Ramngaihawma
Treasurer	Zonunmawii

== See also ==
- Saipum
- Phainuam
- Saiphai
