= Pukzing =

Coordinates: 23.7730°N 92.2664°E

Pukzing is a village in Mamit district of Mizoram state of India.
