= Hortoki =

Hortoki Reraw
- Village
- Location in Mizoram Hortoki (India)
- Coordinates: 24°03′50″N 92°35′50″E
- Country: India
- State: Mizoram
- District: Kolasib

Population (2011)
  - Total: 3,060

Languages
  - Official: Mizo
- Time zone: UTC+5:30 (IST)
- Vehicle registration: MZ
- Website: mizoram.nic.in

Hortoki (Pron:/ˈlʊŋˌleɪ/) is a village, situated in the northwestern part of Mizoram state.
