= West Phaileng =

- Census town
- Location in Mizoram, India West Phaileng (India)
- Coordinates: 23.7440°N 92.3837°E
- Country: India
- State: Mizoram
- District: Mamit
- Elevation: 110 m (360 ft)

Population (2011)
  - Total: 6,066

Languages
  - Official: Mizo
- Time zone: UTC+5:30 (IST)
- PIN: 796431
- Vehicle registration: MZ-09
- Website: mizoram.nic.in

West Phaileng is a census town in Mamit district, in the Indian state of Mizoram. It is one of the largest settlements in the district and serves as a key administrative and economic center for the western region of Mizoram.

== Demographics ==
According to the 2011 Census of India, West Phaileng had a population of 6,066. The official language is Mizo. The majority of the population belongs to the Mizo ethnic group, and the town has a high literacy rate, consistent with the state average.

== Education ==
West Phaileng has several government and private schools providing primary and secondary education, including West Phaileng Higher Secondary School. The town is a local educational center for the surrounding rural areas.

== Healthcare ==
The town has a government-run Community Health Centre (CHC) and several private clinics serving residents and nearby villages.

== Administration ==
West Phaileng is an important administrative center for the western part of Mamit district and hosts several government offices, including those related to rural development and forest management.

== See also ==
- Dampa Tiger Reserve
