= Rajivanagar =

Rajivnagar
- Village
- Country: India
- State: Mizoram
- District: Mamit

Government
  - Type: Panchayati raj (India)
  - Body: Gram panchayat

Languages
  - Official: Chakma
- Time zone: UTC+5:30 (IST)
- Vehicle registration: MZ
- Website: mizoram.nic.in

Rajivnagar is a large village located in Zawlnuam, Mamit district, Mizoram with a total of 708 families residing there. According to the 2011 Population Census, Rajivnagar village has a population of 3,530, comprising 1,796 males and 1,734 females. Rajivnagar, also known as Aamsury, is an important business center for the local Chakma people.

In Rajivnagar village, the population of children aged 0–6 is 703, which constitutes 19.92% of the village's total population. The average sex ratio in Rajivnagar village is 965, which is lower than the state average of 976 in Mizoram. According to the census, the child sex ratio in Rajivnagar is 1,099, which is higher than the state average of 970 in Mizoram.

Rajivnagar village has a lower literacy rate compared to Mizoram. In 2011, the literacy rate in Rajivnagar village was 48.60%, compared to 91.33% in Mizoram. In Rajivnagar the male literacy rate stands at 63.11%, while the female literacy rate is 33.09%.

According to the Constitution of India and the Panchayati Raj Act, Rajivnagar village is administered by a Sarpanch (Head of Village), who is the elected representative of the village.
