= Khawnglung Wildlife Sanctuary =

Wildlife sanctuary in Mizoram, India

- IUCN category IV (habitat/species management area)
- Location within Mizoram Location within India
- Interactive map of Khawnglung Wildlife Sanctuary
- Nearest city: Lunglei
- Coordinates: 23°7′24″N 92°56′48″E
- Area: 35.75 km^{2} (13.80 sq mi)
- Established: 2000
- Governing body: Department of Environment & Forest, Government of Mizoram

Khawnglung Wildlife Sanctuary is a wildlife sanctuary in the Lunglei district of the Indian state of Mizoram. The sanctuary covers about 35.75 km^{2}.

== History ==
The area now known as Khawnglung Wildlife Sanctuary was originally occupied by a village on Khawnglung Mountain, whose steep cliffs formed a natural fortress. According to local legend and historical accounts, the village became the site of violent feuds among regional chieftains (Sailo chiefs) during the mid-19th century. These conflicts culminated in a massacre and the eventual destruction and abandonment of the settlement.

The sanctuary was declared around the year 2000 under the Wildlife provisions of the state. It is administered by the Department of Environment & Forest, Government of Mizoram. Nearby fringe villages include Pangzawl, Rawpui, Bungtlang, Sialsir, Lungchhuan, and Chawntui.

== Geography and Location ==
The sanctuary lies in the hilly terrain of southern Mizoram. The geographic coordinates — 23°07′–23°09′ N, 92°52′–92°54′ E — are based on official state-forest documentation. The terrain consists of steep slopes, ridges and hill-forest typical of the subtropical / semi-evergreen forests of the region.

== Flora & Fauna ==
A Survey have recorded high diversity of pteridophytes (33 species) in the sanctuary.

The sanctuary provides habitat to various mammals and birds typical of northeastern Indian hill forests. Reported mammals include hoolock gibbon, barking deer, sambar deer, wild boar and leopard. The region is also noted for its avifauna, making it of interest for birdwatching.

An eco-sensitive zone (ESZ) notification for Khawnglung has been issued by the central government; the notification outlines buffer-zone regulations around the sanctuary to help conserve its biodiversity and prevent incompatible development.

== Access and Tourism ==
The sanctuary is accessible by road from the state capital (Aizawl) via Lunglei — about 160–170 km by road according to tourism sources. Best visiting season is generally October–March when weather is more favourable.

== See also ==
- Tawi Wildlife Sanctuary
- Thorangtlang Wildlife Sanctuary
