= Tuahzawl =

Tuahzawl Tuahzawl
- city
- Location within Mizoram Location within India
- Coordinates: 23.768°N 92.563°E
- Country: India
- State: Mizoram
- District: Mamit
- Elevation: 1,369 m (4,491 ft)

Population (2001)
  - Total: 408

Languages
  - Official: Mizo
- Time zone: UTC+5:30 (IST)
- Vehicle registration: MZ
- Website: mizoram.nic.in

Tuahzawl is located near to state capital Aizawl.

== Demographics ==
As of 2001 India census, Tuahzawl had a population of 408.
