= Solomon's Temple, Aizawl =

Church in Mizoram, India

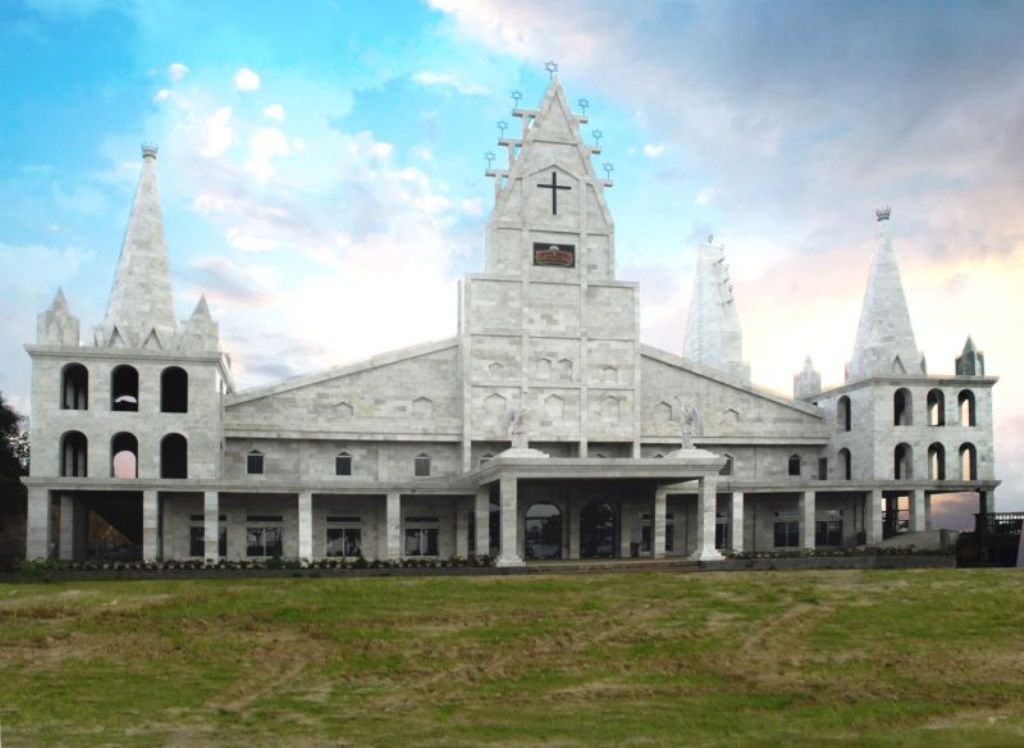
- Solomon's Temple
- Solomon's Temple, Aizawl
- 23.7479°N 92.6884°E
- Location: Aizwal, Mizoram
- Country: India
- Denomination: Christian
- Website: kohhranthianghlim.org

History
- Founder: Kohhran Thianghlim (The Holy Church)
- Consecrated: Foundation stone laid on 23 December 1996; 29 years ago

Architecture
- Architect: Dr. L.B. Sailo

Solomon's Temple is a church located in Aizawl, Mizoram, India.

The temple was constructed by the religious group Kohhran Thianghlim, translated as 'The Holy Church' in English. It was founded by Dr. L.B. Sailo in 1984 and is non-denominational. The temple is one of the largest in Mizoram state.

== History ==
Dr. L.B. Sailo, the founder of Kohhran Thianghlim Church, said, "In the year 1991, God showed me Solomon's Temple in my dreams. I had never thought of Solomon's temple before, nor had any dream of constructing it, but when I saw it in my dreams in 1991, as soon as I woke up, I wrote down the temple as I saw in my dream." The church was built on the western outskirts of Aizawl, the capital of the Mizoram state in India. The foundation stone was laid on 23 December 1996, and construction finished 20 years later, with a Christmas service in 2017 inaugurating the temple.

== Architecture ==
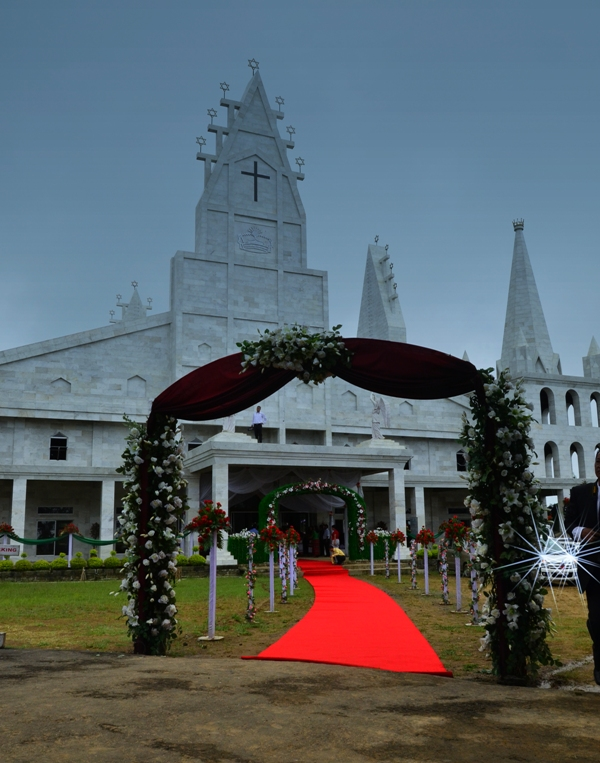
Solomon's Temple, Mizoram on Coronation Day

=== Area ===
The Temple area accommodates 2,000 people within the main hall and 10,000 within its courtyard. It is a square site measuring 180 ft. on each side. The interior of the Temple building is also square, measuring 120 ft. on each side. A 30 ft. wide verandah called 'The porch of Solomon's Temple' is attached to the exterior of the main hall on all four sides. This provides a shelter for people with its sizeable seating capacity.

=== Design ===
The main building has twelve main doors, three doors per wall. The exterior walls of the Temple face exactly South, North, East, and West. Above the porch are four pillars, each carrying seven David's stars, meant to represent the seven churches of the Book of Revelation. On each of the pillars is a picture of the Cross of Jesus Christ and the emblem of the Holy Church. Atop the porch is an image of two angels blowing trumpets which face the top of the pillar and flank the northern side of the pillar, which is now used as the main entrance. The temple has four towers, one on each corner. Each tower is topped with a crown, representing the Crown of Salvation, the Crown of Righteousness, the Crown of Life and the Crown of the Overcomer. There are two intersecting horizontal ridges that cross in the middle of the pitch roof such that when viewed from the air they form a cross, representing the New Covenant. The Temple has 32 windows, 32 ventilations, and 32 skylights. It is a multi-story building.

=== Temple Complex ===
Within its compound, the temple complex has a natural park covered by a selection of forest trees that provide shade and fruit for animal life. There is a restaurant for temple visitors. The complex houses an educational institution and a social service center that provides help with addiction and includes a polyclinics hospital.

=== Finance ===
The temple cost $3 million to complete. Most of the funds were contributed by church members with smaller donations received from outside the church.

== Temple Service ==
The temple holds church services each Sunday. It also hosts special events such as Zanlai Au Aw (Midnight Herald) Anniversary organized by the Publication Board of Kohhran Thianghlim, and Missionary Day organized by the Mission Board and Jerusalem Khawmpui in late December of each year. The temple is also used as a center for blood donations organized by the Church's youth wing, Youth Evangelical Front.

== Tourist Attraction ==
Solomon's Temple, Aizawl has become one of the most visited tourist attractions in Aizawl.

== Gallery ==
Solomon's Temple, Aizawl Gallery

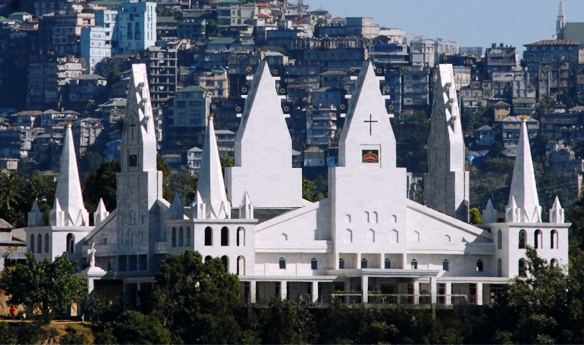
Solomon's Temple, Aizawl, Mizoram, India, from Tanhril

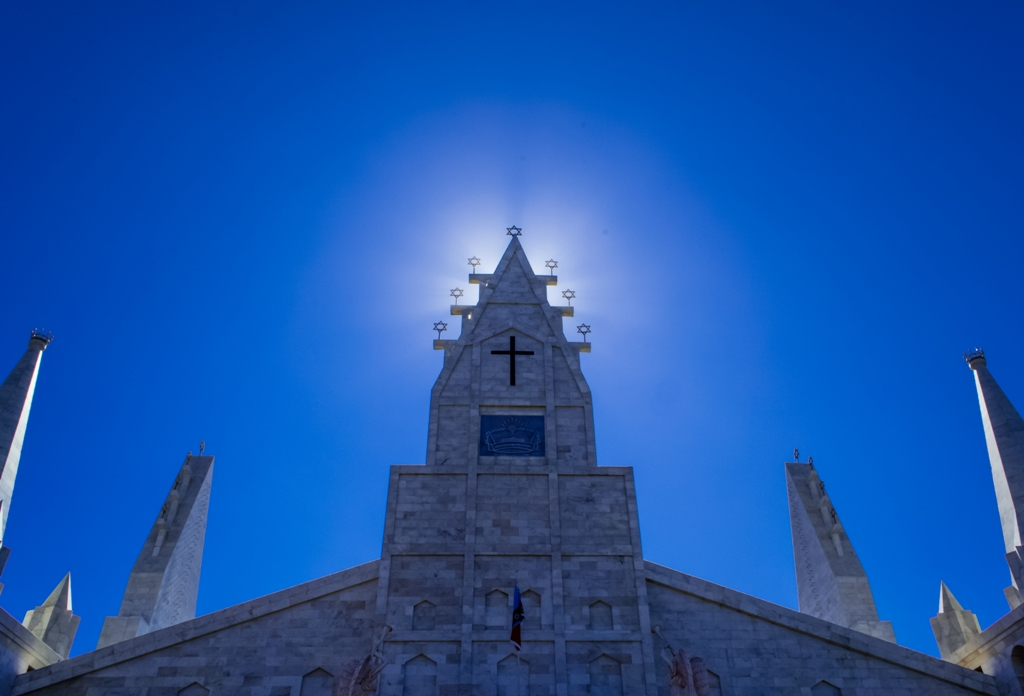
Solomon's Temple during Jerusalem Khawmpui 2013

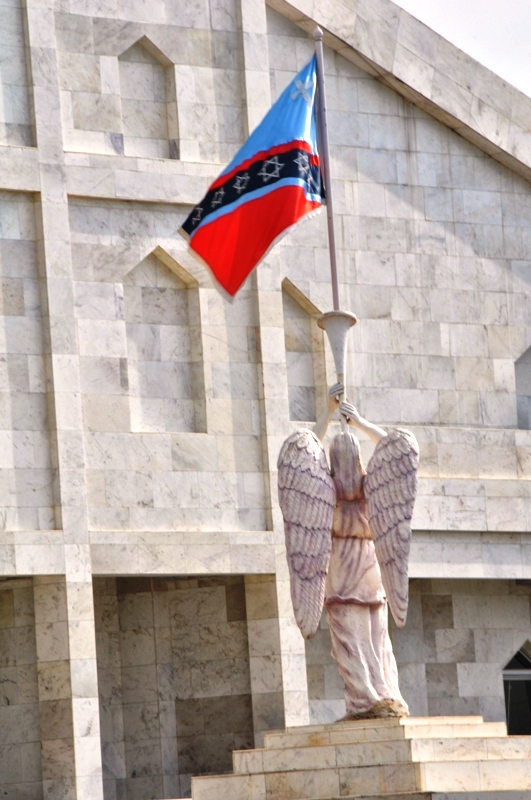
An Angel and the Flag of Holy Church

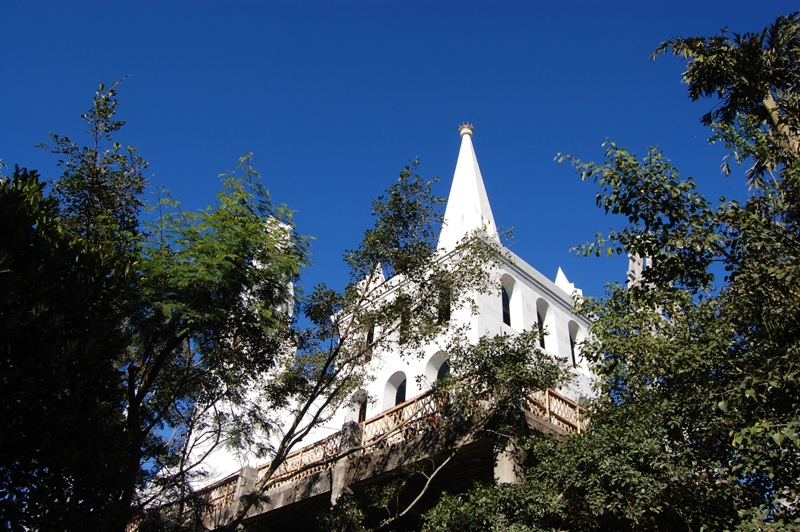
Solomon's Temple between the trees

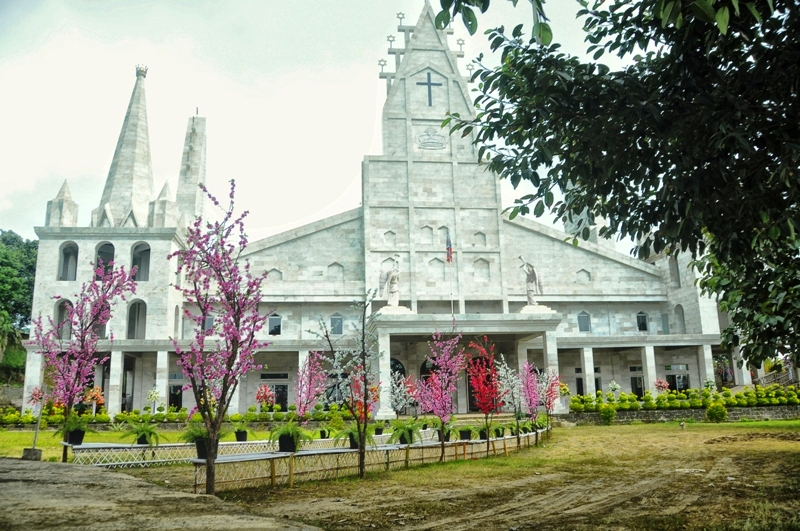
Solomon's Temple on Coronation Day 2013

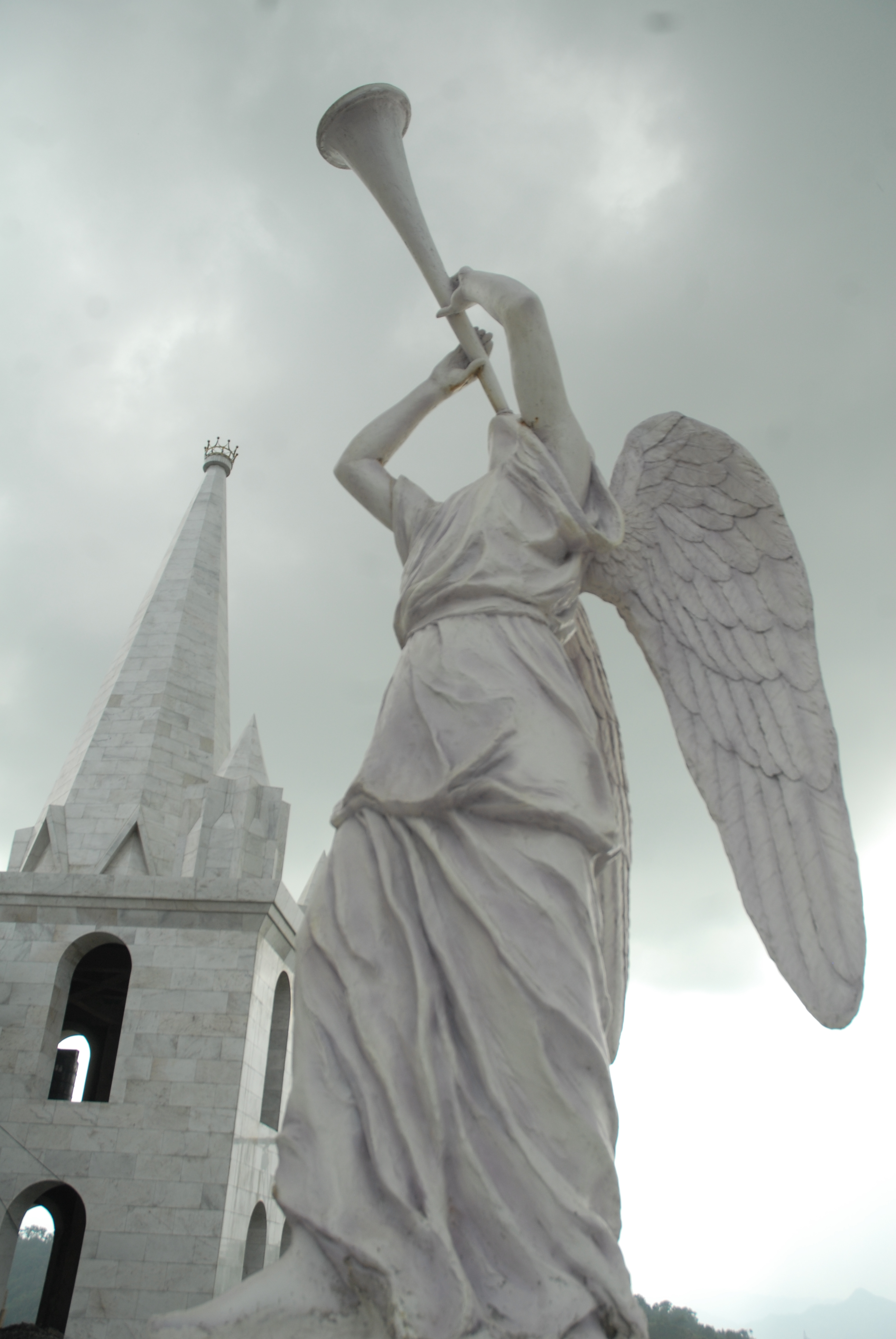
An Angel blowing Trumpet with a tower in the background

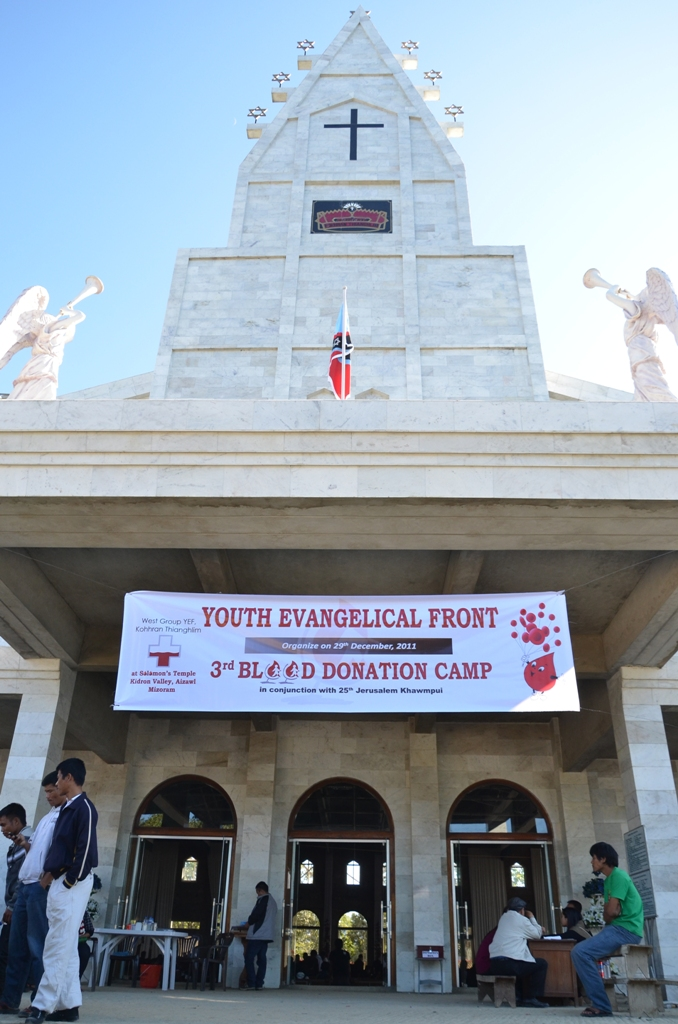
Blood Donation Day with David's Pillar in the background

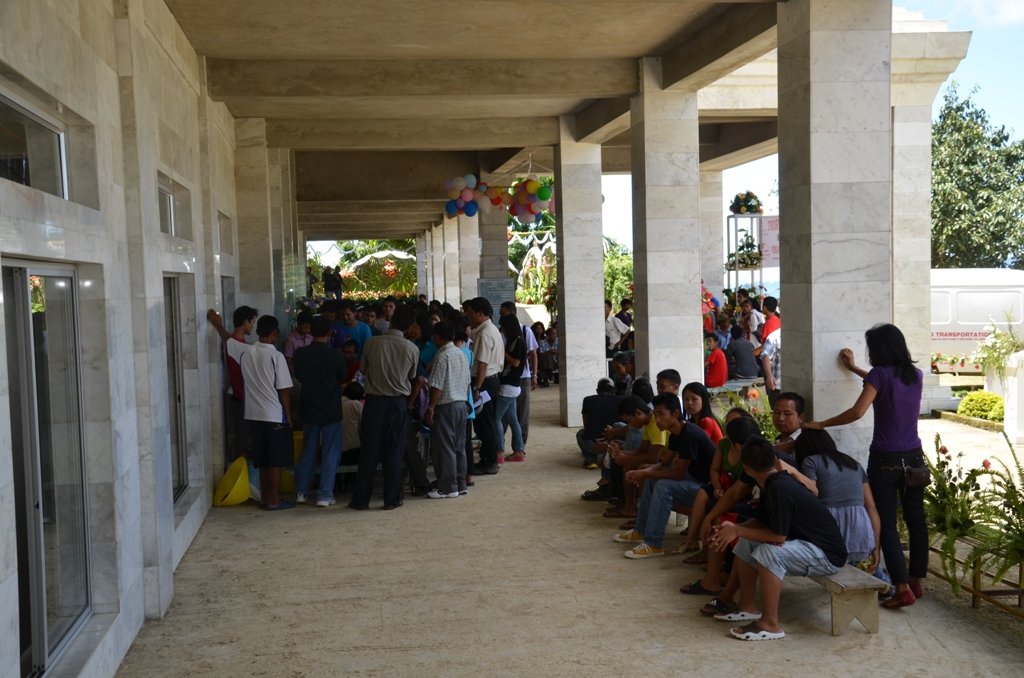
Church members waiting for turn on Blood Donation camp at Temple

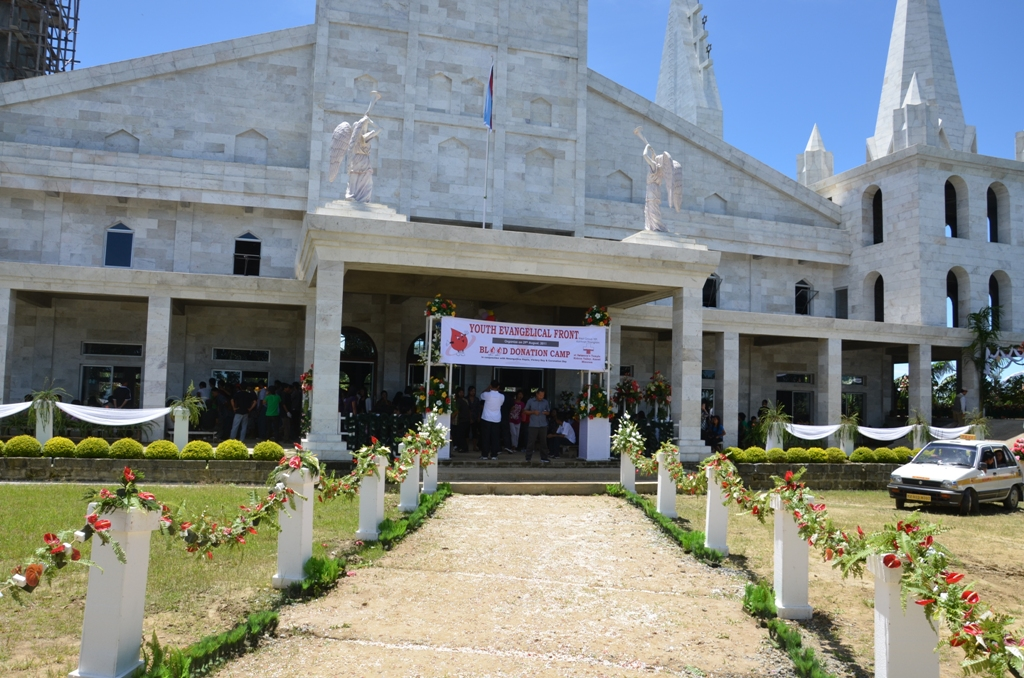
Face of Temple with Blood Donation Banner

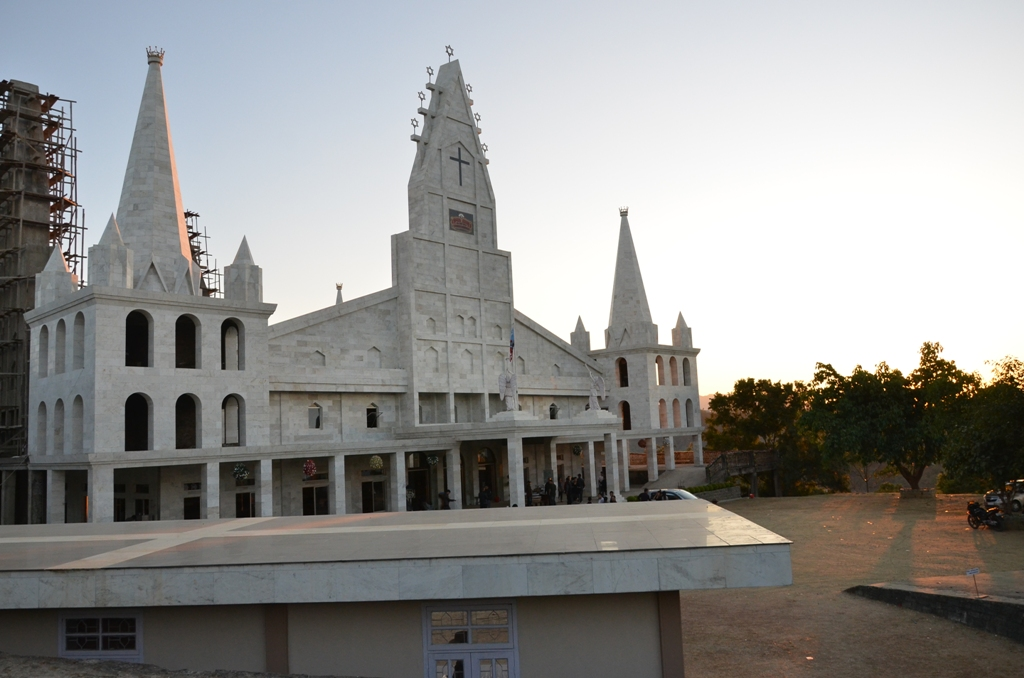
Eastern side of the Temple under construction

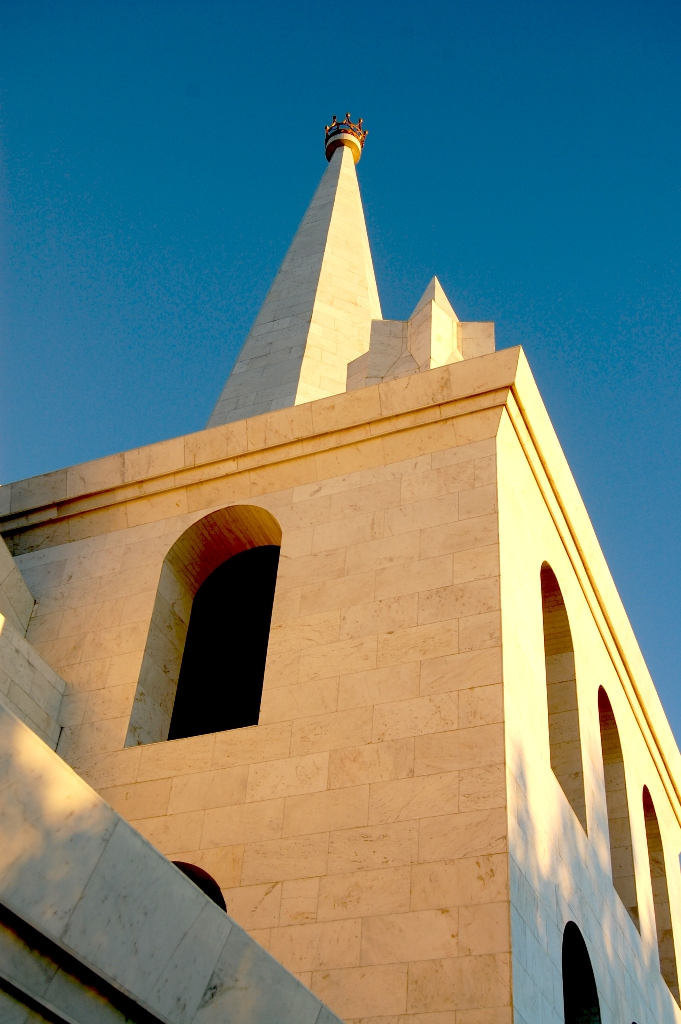
Temple Tower at the sunset

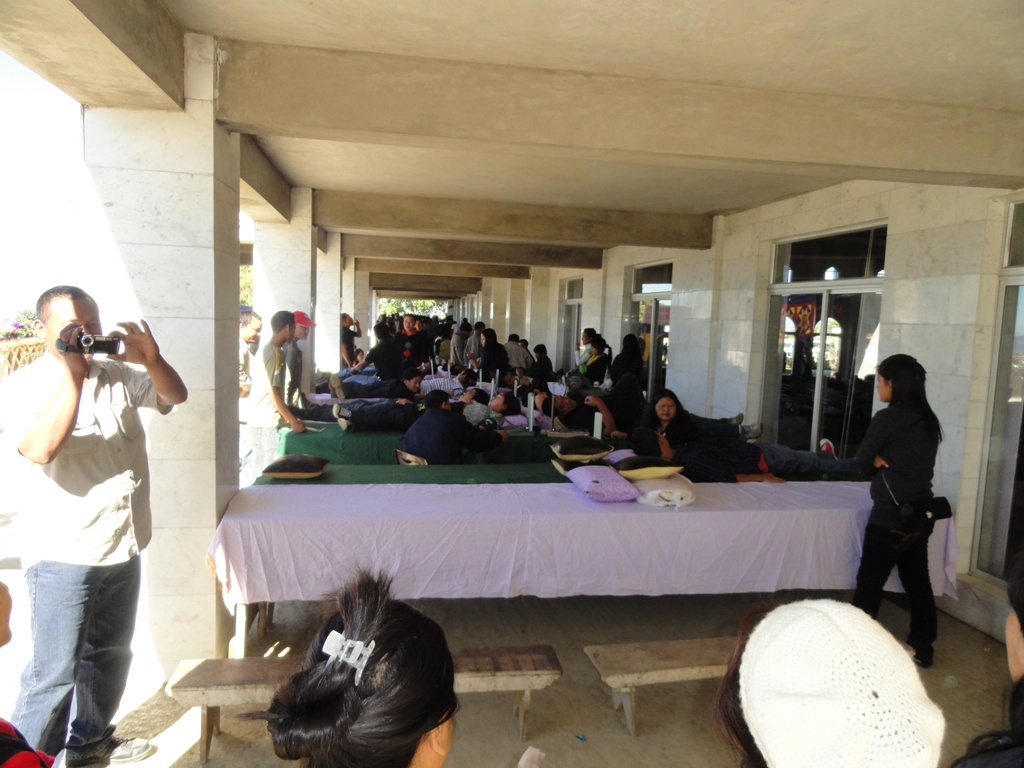
Blood Donation held at the porch of Temple

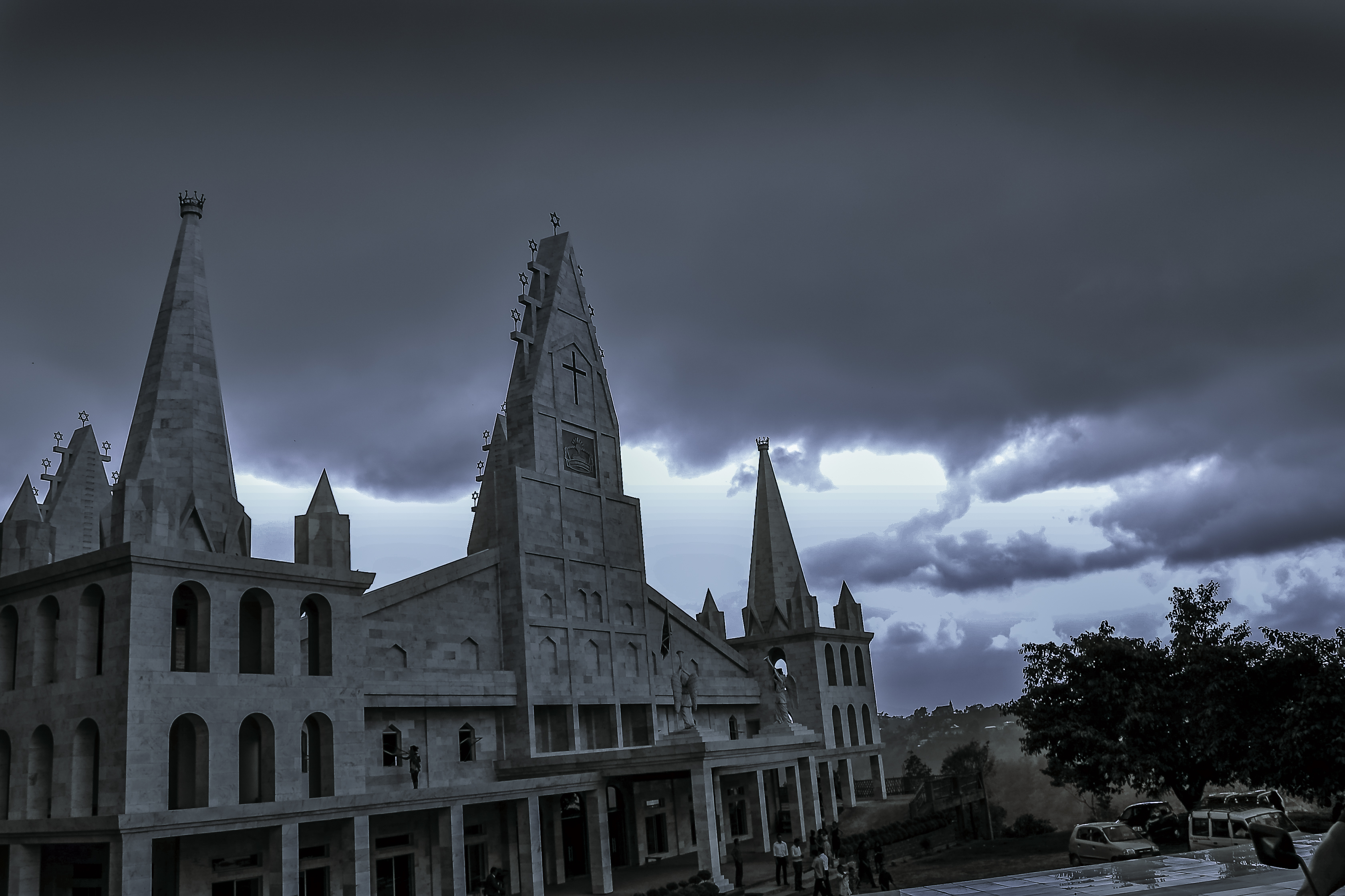
Solomon's Temple on a cloudy day

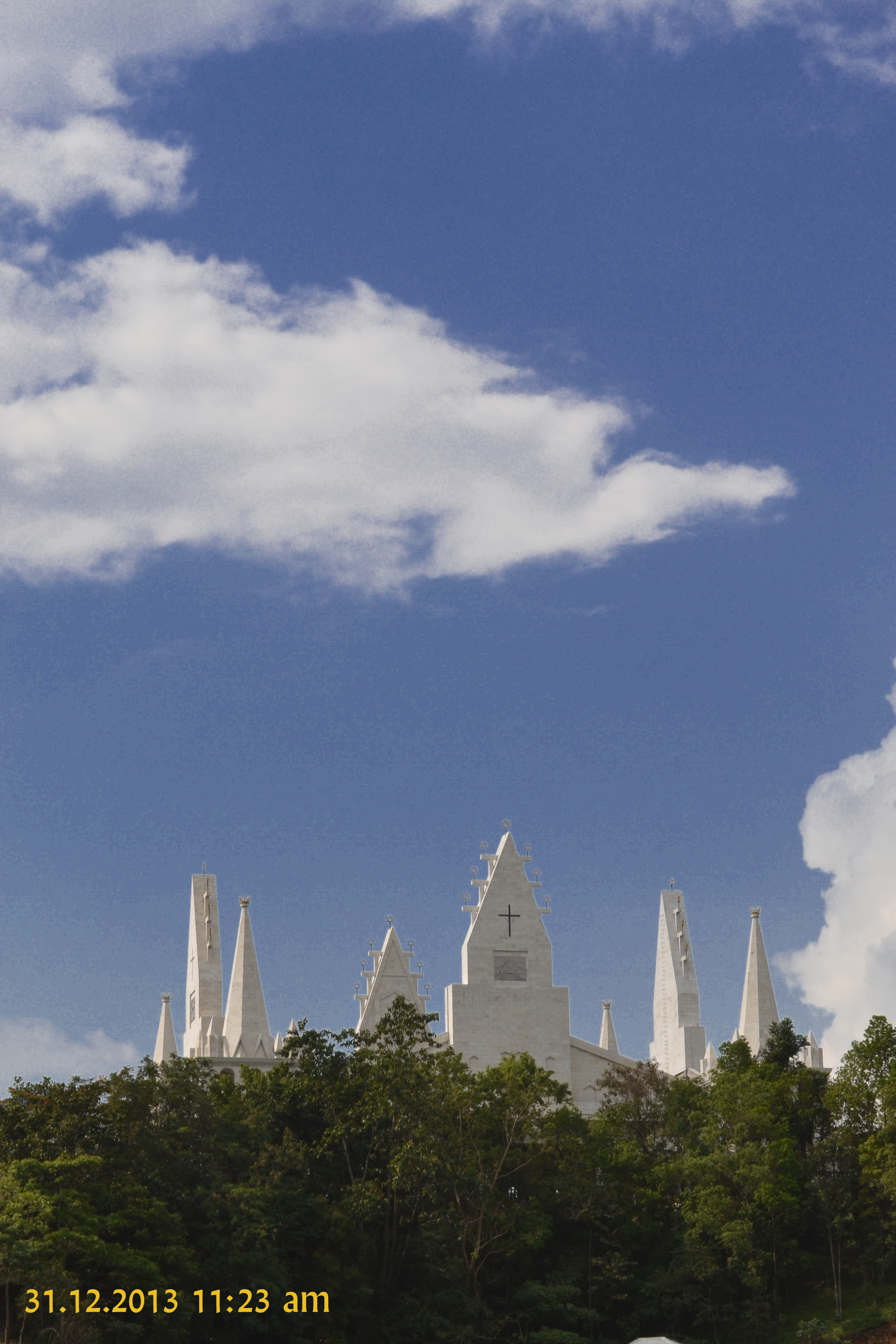
Solomon's Temple from south-eastern side

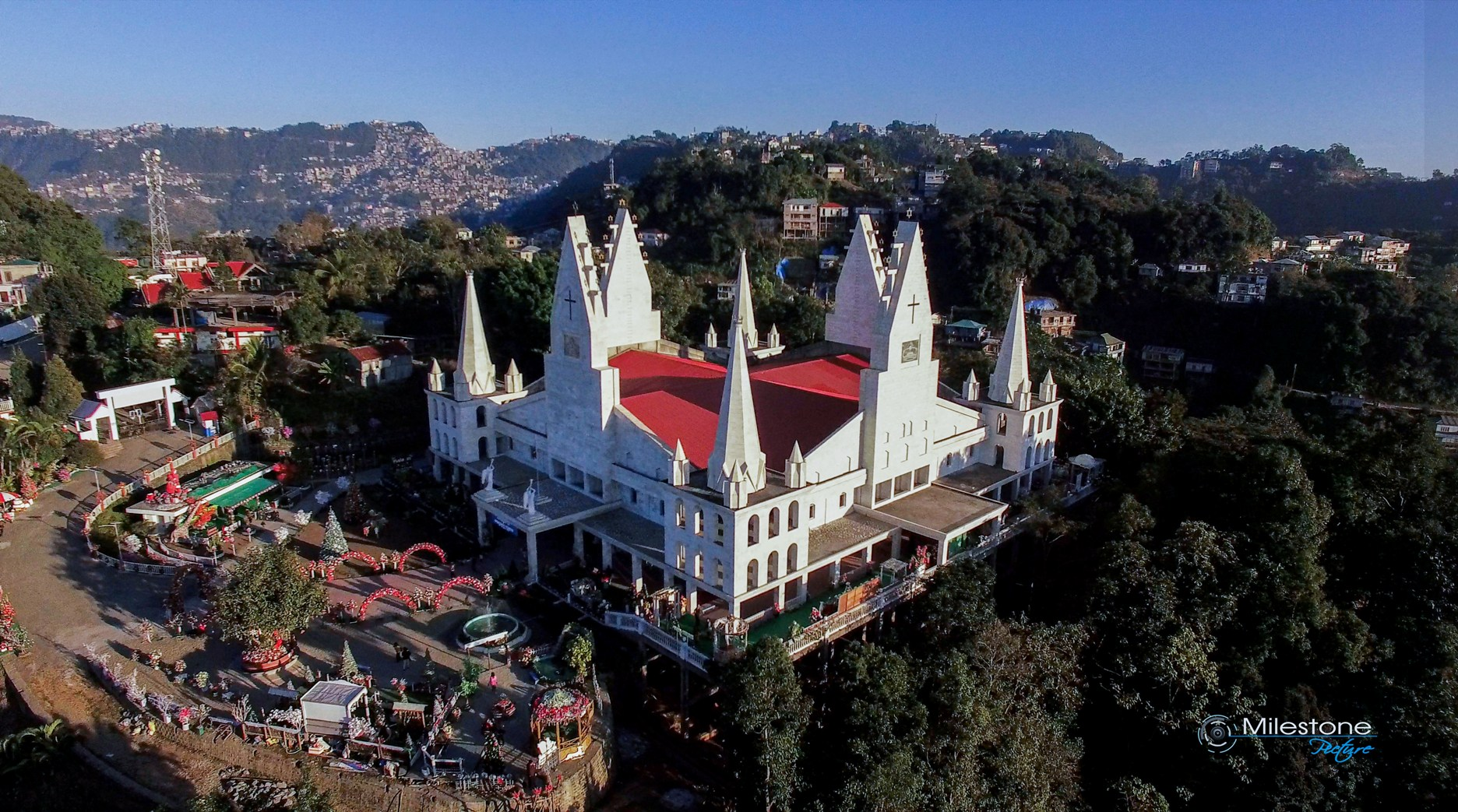
Solomon's Temple from above (1st Prize in 1st Category, Solomon's Temple Photo Competition-2018)

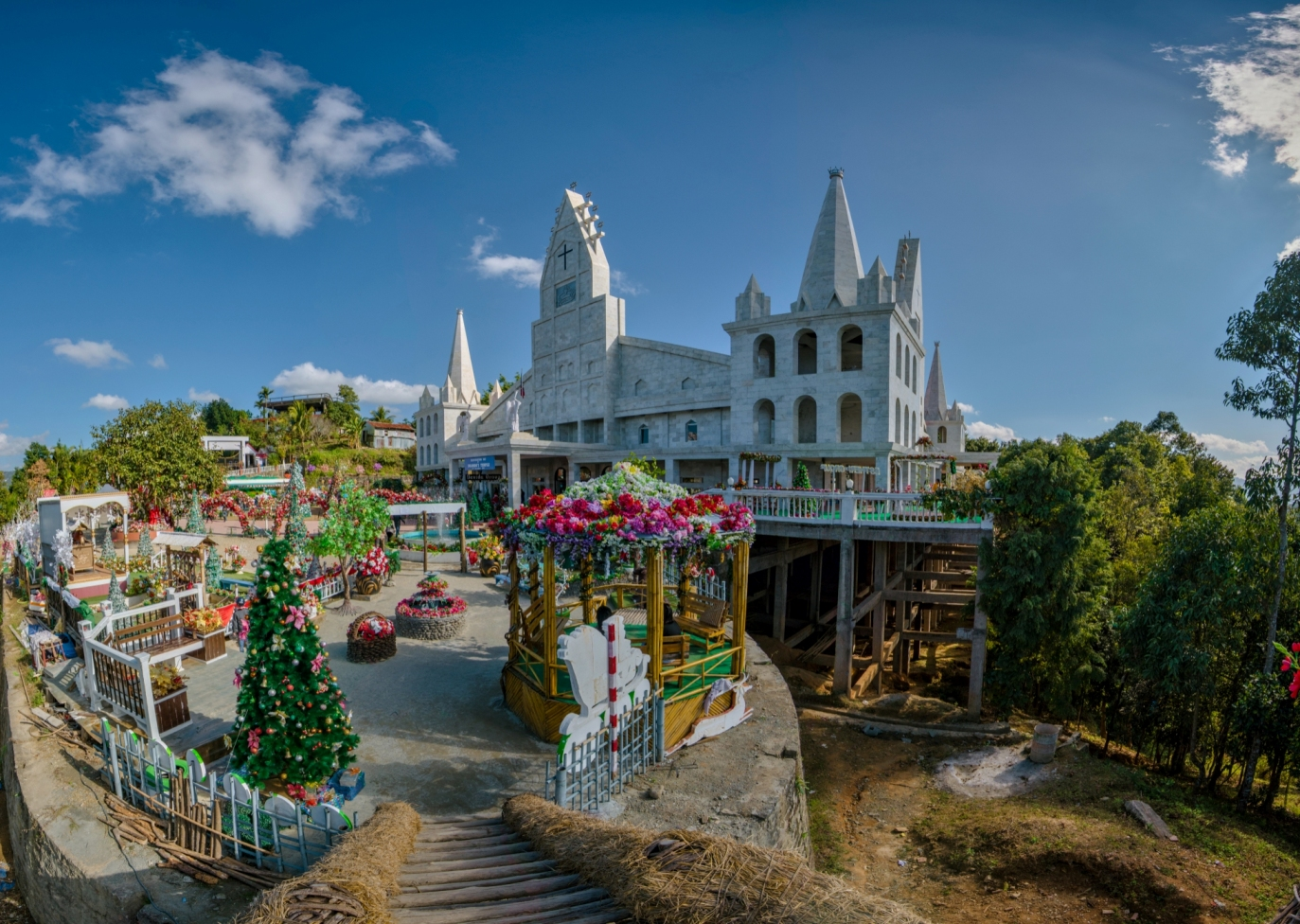
Solomon's Temple (2nd Prize in 1st Category, Solomon's Temple Photo Competition-2018)

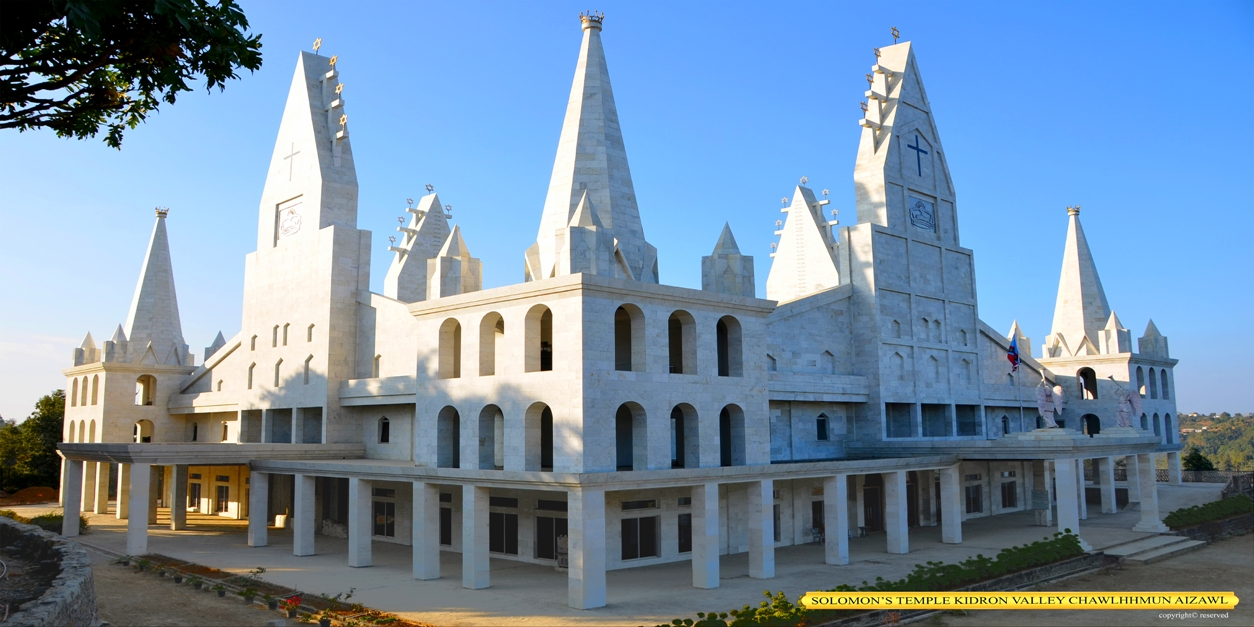
Solomon's Temple (3rd Prize in 1st Category, Solomon's Temple Photo Competition-2018)

Solomon's Temple in 2026
