= Serlui =

River in Mizoram, India

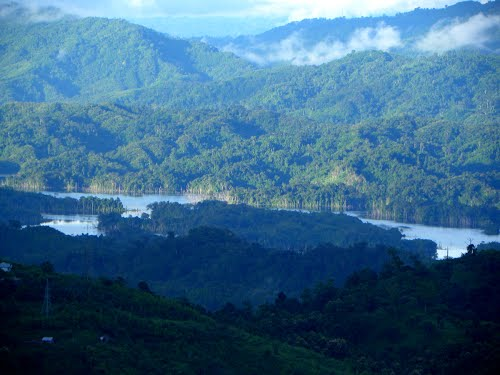
Serlui

The Serlui is a river of Mizoram, northeastern India. It flows through Kolasib district and is impounded by the Serlui B Dam.

It is known as Rukni, a tributary of Sonai River. It flows in a northerly direction towards Cachar district and joins the Sonai River near Sundari village in Cachar district.
