= Dampa Tiger Reserve =

Tiger reserve in Mizoram, India

- IUCN category IV (habitat/species management area)
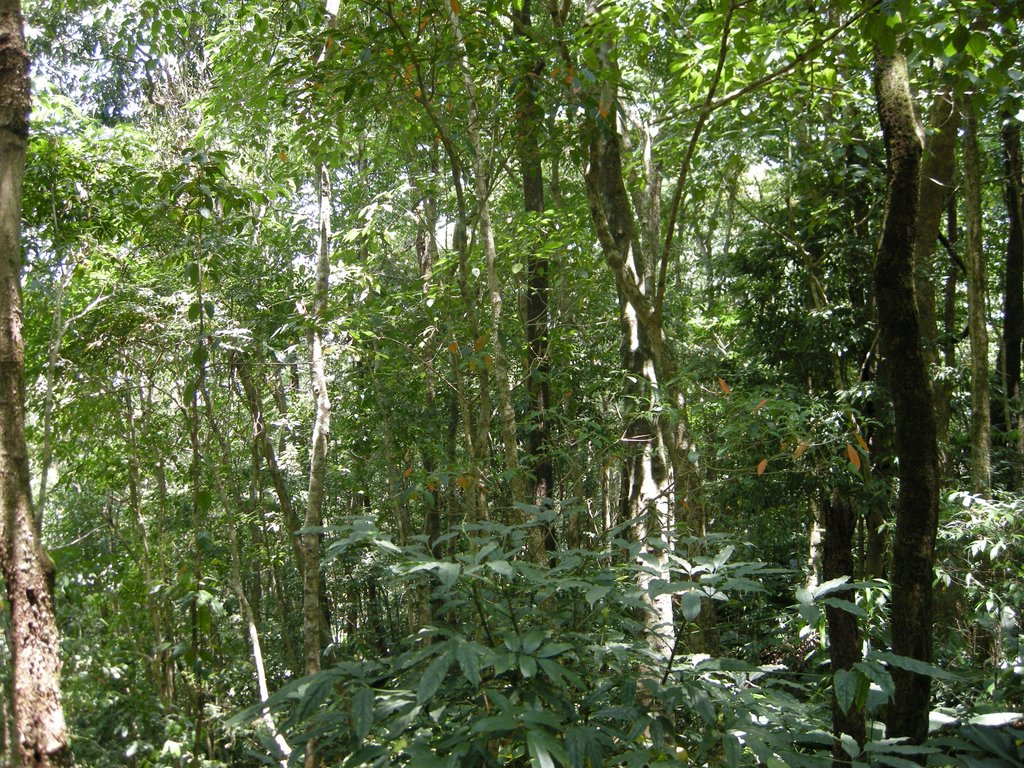
- Dampa Tiger Reserve Forest

- Location within Mizoram Location within India
- Interactive map of Dampa Tiger Reserve
- Location: Mizoram, India
- Nearest city: Aizawl
- Coordinates: 23°34′N 92°22′E
- Area: 500 km^{2} (190 sq mi)
- Established: 1985
- Visitors: NA
- Governing body: Ministry of Environment and Forests, Government of India

Dampa Tiger Reserve or Dampha Tiger Reserve is a tiger reserve in western Mizoram, India. It covers an area of about 500 km^{2} (190 sq mi) in the Lushai Hills at an elevation of 800–1,100 m (2,600–3,600 ft). It is the largest wildlife sanctuary in Mizoram. It was declared a tiger reserve in 1994 and is part of Project Tiger.

The tropical forests of Dampa Tiger Reserve are home to a diverse flora and fauna. It consists of forest interpolated with steep precipitous hills, deep valleys, jungle streams, ripping rivulets, natural salts licks. Dampa Tiger Reserve is not easily accessible unlike other park where you can ride on a four wheeler but one has to walk through the forest if one wishes to sight animals. In the 2018 tiger monitoring survey, no tiger was found in this reserve.

== Etymology ==
The word Dampa means "lonely men" and refers to a local narrative about a village, where a lot of the women died.

== History ==
The protected area was initially established as wildlife sanctuary in 1985 with an area of about 680 km^{2} (260 sq mi), which was reduced to about 340 km^{2} (130 sq mi). In 1994, it received the status of a Tiger Reserve with an area of 500 km^{2} (190 sq mi) and thus became part of Project Tiger.

== Flora ==
Rare floral species have been found in Dampa Tiger Reserve including rare ginger species Globba spathulata and Hemiorchis pantlingii.

== Fauna ==
=== Mammals ===
Dampa Tiger Reserve hosts Indian leopard, sloth bear, gaur, serow, barking deer, wild boar, hoolock gibbon, Phayre's leaf monkey, gray langur, Rhesus macaque and slow loris. Four Bengal tigers were recorded in 1994 but none were recorded in 2019. Dampa Tiger Reserve has one of the highest clouded leopard populations in South and South East Asia.

In 2012, tiger presence was confirmed through Scat samples. No tiger was recorded in Dampa Tiger Reserve in the years 2018–2019. However, the National Tiger Conservation Authority recommended that tigers from Assam's Kaziranga National Park be introduced to Dampa Tiger Reserve.

=== Birds ===
Bird species sighted in Dampa Tiger Reserve include great hornbill, wreathed hornbill, oriental pied hornbill, scarlet-backed flowerpecker, Kalij pheasant, grey peacock-pheasant, speckled piculet and white-browed piculet, bay woodpecker, greater yellownape, greater flameback, great barbet, blue-throated barbet, red-headed trogon, Indian cuckoo, Asian barred owlet, green imperial pigeon, mountain imperial pigeon, emerald dove, crested serpent eagle, Malayan night heron, long-tailed broadbill, Asian fairy bluebird, blue-winged leafbird, golden-fronted leafbird, orange-bellied leafbird, scarlet minivet, maroon oriole, greater racket-tailed drongo, Indian paradise-flycatcher, pale-chinned blue flycatcher, blue-throated flycatcher, black-naped monarch, grey-headed canary flycatcher, white-rumped shama, slaty-backed forktail, spotted forktail, chestnut-bellied nuthatch, velvet-fronted nuthatch, black bulbul, black-crested bulbul, ashy bulbul, white-throated bulbul, slaty-bellied tesia and striated yuhina.

== Threats ==
It has been reported that there has been an increase in built up areas (590%), bamboo forest (192.89%) and scrub (74.67%). These increases are simultaneously accompanied by decrease in evergreen and semievergreen closed forests from 152.47 km^{2} (58.87 sq mi) in 1978 to 95.27 km^{2} (36.78 sq mi) in 2005. This could be due to the practice of shifting cultivation by villagers at the border of the reserve. A 62-km fence and patrol road along the Bangladesh boundary near the reserve in Mizoram is hindering the free movement of tigers at Dampa. Oil palm and teak plantations close to Dampa Tiger Reserve are also reducing habitat for wildlife and could pose a bigger threat than shifting cultivation. There have also been reported cases of poaching by different groups including local hunters and insurgent groups like Shanti Bahini and the National Liberation Front of Tripura.

== See also ==
- Reserved forests and protected forests of India
- Tawi Wildlife Sanctuary
- Khawnglung Wildlife Sanctuary
