= Pualreng Wildlife Sanctuary =

Wildlife sanctuary in Mizoram, India

- IUCN category IV (habitat/species management area)
- Location within Mizoram Location within India
- Interactive map of Pualreng Wildlife Sanctuary
- Location: Kolasib district, Mizoram, India
- Nearest city: Aizawl
- Coordinates: 24.136°N 92.838°E
- Area: 50 km^{2} (19 sq mi)
- Established: 29 July 2004
- Governing body: Environment, Forests & Climate Change Department, Government of Mizoram

Pualreng Wildlife Sanctuary is a wildlife sanctuary in the Kolasib district in the Indian state of Mizoram. It was notified on 29 July 2004 and it covers approximately 50 km² of tropical evergreen and semi-evergreen forest in the northeastern hill ranges.

== Geography and climate ==
The sanctuary ranges up to 750 m above sea level and receives 2,000–3,900 mm of annual rainfall. Summer temperatures reach 20–30 °C, while winters drop to 10–20 °C.

== Biodiversity ==
Pualreng’s forests support a rich assemblage of mammals including hoolock gibbon (Hoolock hoolock), slow loris (Nycticebus sp.), common langur (Semnopithecus sp.), Himalayan black bear (Ursus thibetanus), leopard (Panthera pardus), sambar (Rusa unicolor), barking deer (Muntiacus muntjak), binturong (Arctictis binturong) and Chinese pangolin (Manis pentadactyla).

Over 100 bird species have been recorded, notably Great Hornbill (Buceros bicornis), Wreathed Hornbill (Rhyticeros undulatus), Pied Hornbill (Anthracoceros albirostris), kalij pheasant (Lophura leucomelanos), Bhutan peacock-pheasant (Polyplectron bicalcaratum) and red junglefowl (Gallus gallus).

A 2021 study on Reptiles & Amphibians documented interspecific amplexus between two frog species (Polypedates teraiensis and Hydrophylax leptoglossa), underscoring the sanctuary’s amphibian diversity.

== Conservation and threats ==
A 2022 remote-sensing assessment revealed a >10% decline in forest cover (≈5.2 km²) from 2006–2018 due to illegal clearing, grazing, and reservoir submergence. In November 2024, a joint operation seized smoked wild-animal meat in the sanctuary, leading to convictions under the Wildlife Protection Act.
