= Bilkhawthlir =

- Town
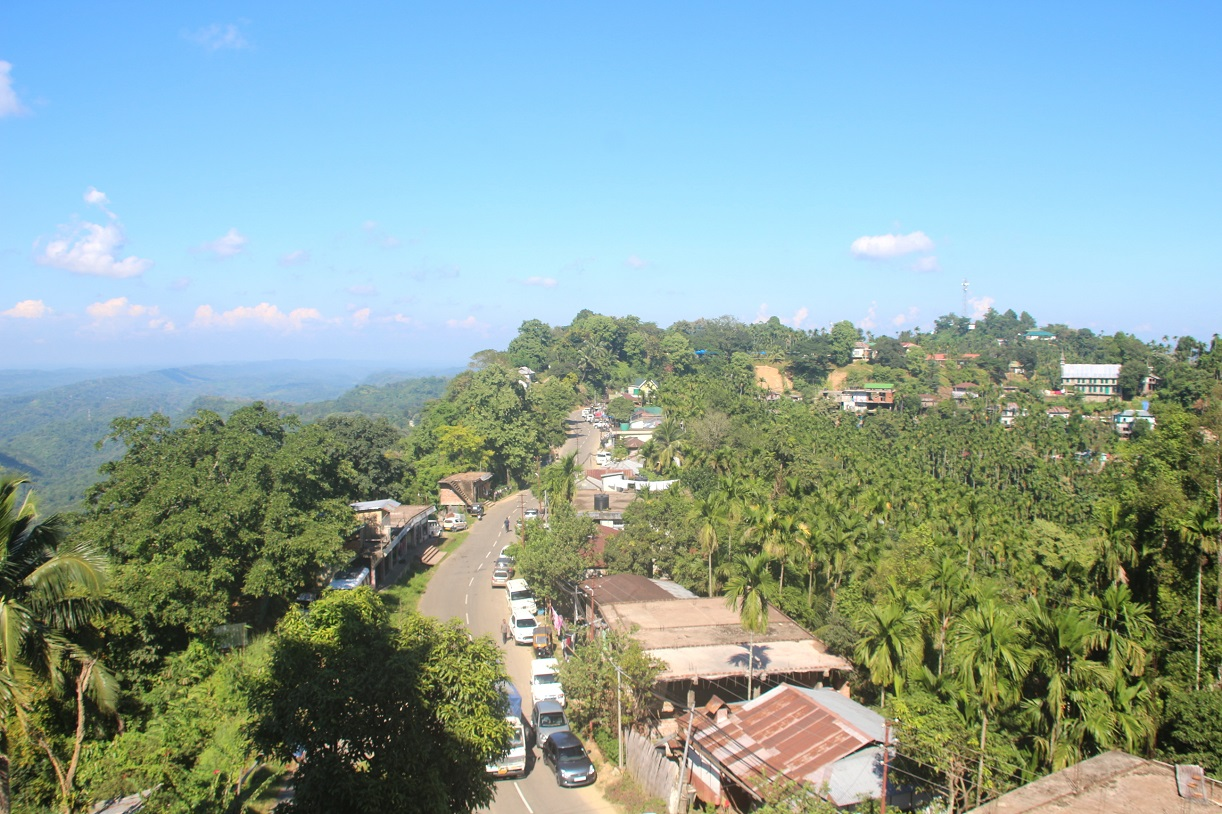
- Bilkhawthlir

- Location within Mizoram Location within India
- Coordinates: 24°20′52″N 92°45′34″E
- Country: India
- State: Mizoram
- District: Kolasib
- Elevation: 888 m (2,913 ft)

Population (2011)
  - Total: 5,385

Languages
  - Official: Mizo
- Time zone: UTC+5:30 (IST)
- Vehicle registration: MZ
- Website: bdobilkhawthlir.mizoram.gov.in

Bilkhawthlir is a town in Kolasib District, Mizoram, India. It is also known as City of Betel Nut, due to its Betel/areca nut farming, which acts as a major source of income for the town.

== Demographics ==
As of the 2011 Census of India, Bilkhawthlir had a population of 5385 of which 2735 are males while 2650 are females.
