= Saipum =

Village in Kolasib district, Mizoram, India

- Village
- Country: India
- State: Mizoram
- District: Kolasib district
- Block: Bilkhawthlir

Population (2011)
  - Total: 2,359

Languages
  - Official: Mizo
- Time zone: UTC+5:30 (IST)
- PIN: 796101
- Vehicle registration: MZ

Saipum is Hmar village located in the Bilkhawthlir Block of Kolasib district in the Indian state of Mizoram. The village falls under Bilkhawthlir Rural Development Block. Saipum has a Branch Post Office and has the postal PIN code 796101.

== Demographics ==
According to the 2011 Census of India, Saiphai had a population of 2359 people living in 448 households. The village had a literacy rate of 95.31%.

== Saipum village council members (2025-2030) ==
Saipum-I village council members (2025–2030)Saipum-II village council members (2025–2030)
Position	Name
President	Lalnunsanga
Vice President	Lalrengpuii
Secretary	A Zohmingliana
Treasurer	Lalringliana
Member	R. Lalchamliana
Member	H. Lalbiakmawia
Position	Name
President	Lalhlimpuia
Vice President	C.S Laltanpuia
Secretary	Ramropuia Varte
Treasurer	Lalropuia
Member	Lalbiaktluanga
Member	Lalzamlovi
