= Serlui B Dam =

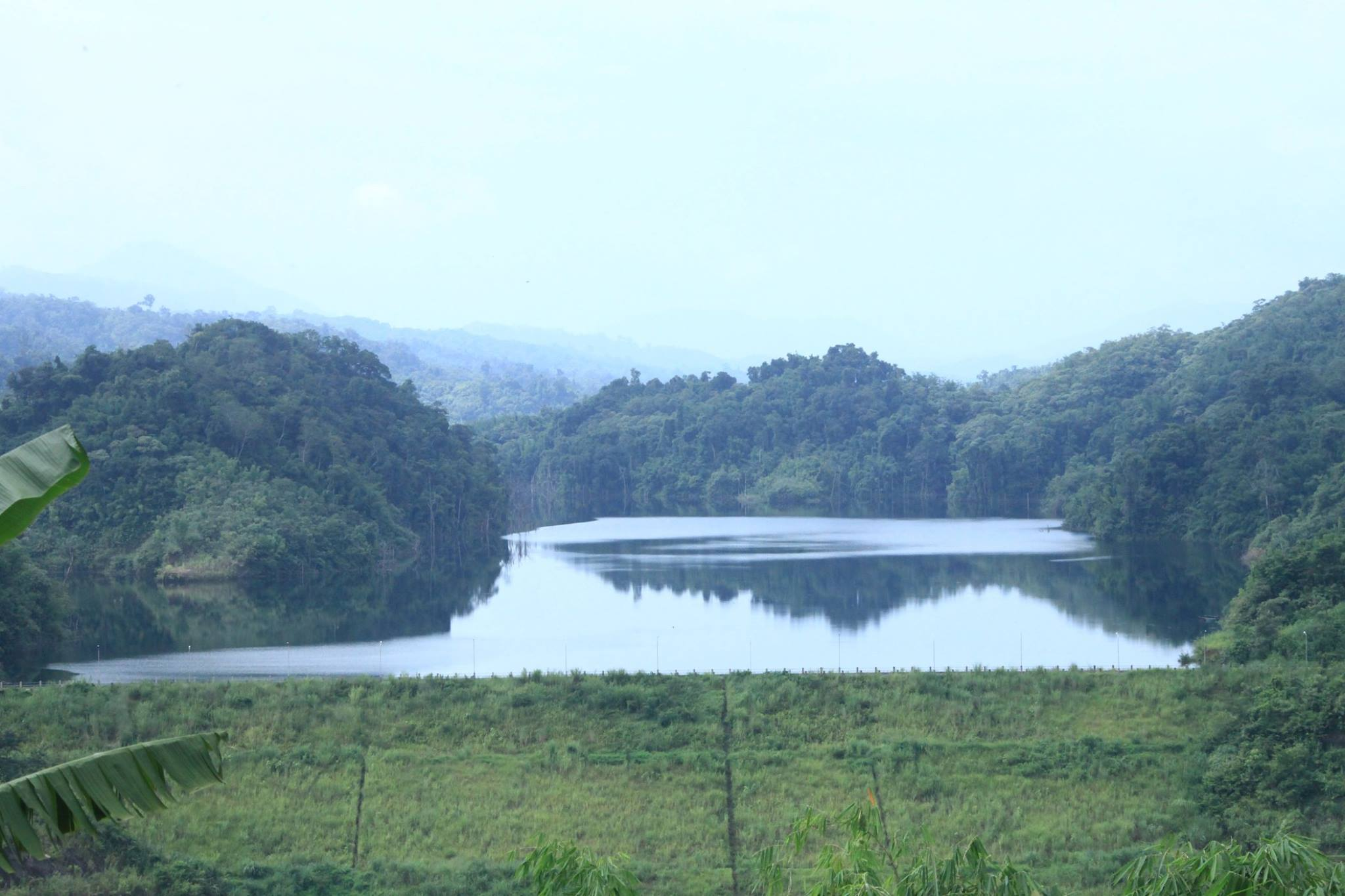

- Location within India
- Country: India
- Location: Serlui
- Coordinates: 24°20′18.18″N 92°46′06.48″E
- Construction began: 2003
- Opening date: 2009

Dam and spillways
- Type of dam: Embankment, earth-fill
- Impounds: Serlui River
- Height: 51 m (167 ft)
- Length: 293 m (961 ft)

Reservoir
- Catchment area: 53 Km

Power Station
- Turbines: 3 x 4 MW
- Installed capacity: 12 MW

Serlui B dam, is an earthfill and gravity dam on the Serlui river 12 km from Bilkhawthlir Village near the Kolasib district in the state of Mizoram in India.

== Technical Features ==
Serlui B Dam has three units, each with a capacity to generate 4 MW of power . The Dam of the Hydel Project is called an earthen dam. The dam is 51.3 metres high from the river bed, 293 metres long, 8 metres narrow at the top and 394.2 metres wide at the bottom.

== History ==
Construction on the dam with 12 MW hydroelectric power station began in 2003 and was completed in 2009 but there were some leakages which delayed commissioning of the Hydel Project. The Construction of Serlui B dam submerged the village of Builum and they were rehabilitated in Bawktlang village. Serlui B Dam has been constructed by Bharat Heavy Electricals Limited and Metallurgical Electrical Consultant India Ltd.

== Tourism ==
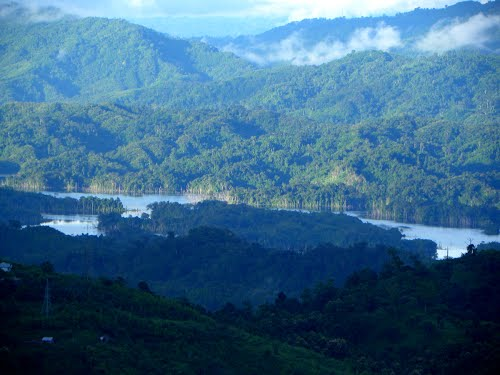
Serlui

Plans were made by the Mizoram Tourism Department to develop tourist infrastructure since the area near the dam is thickly forested with a 53 km scenic lake in the middle of it. The tourist Lodge is Serlui B Dam was inaugurated on 23 June 2018.The tourist Lodge building is 367.90 sq.m with a plot are of 2198.81 sq.m a ni a, Facilities include Rooms and Dormitories.

== Pisciculture ==
Serlui B Dam is also being developed as a pisciculture center with lakhs of fishes released into the dam in 2009. The state Government of Mizoram has received over 45 lakhs as revenue for 5 years.
