= Aizwal Mosque =

Mosque in Mizoram, India

Aizawl Mosque

Religion
- Affiliation: Islam

Location
- Municipality: Aizawl
- State: Mizoram
- Country: India
- Interactive map of Aizawl Mosque
- Coordinates: 23°43′52″N 92°43′03″E

Architecture
- Type: mosque
- Established: 1909
- Capacity: approx. 2000

Aizawl Mosque is the principal mosque located in Aizawl, the capital of the state of Mizoram, India.

== History ==
The mosque was founded in 1909 under the leadership of Jonab Deewan Musolman from Dacca of undivided India( Today:capital of Bangladesh) marking the formal establishment of the Muslim community in Aizawl.

During the March 1966 air raids linked to the Mizo National Front uprising, Aizawl Mosque was destroyed by aerial bombing. It was subsequently rebuilt under the guidance of Late M. Bakhtar Uddin Majumdar, with the reconstructed mosque now able to accommodate around 2,000 worshippers.

== See also ==
- Islam in Mizoram
