= Christianity in Mizoram =

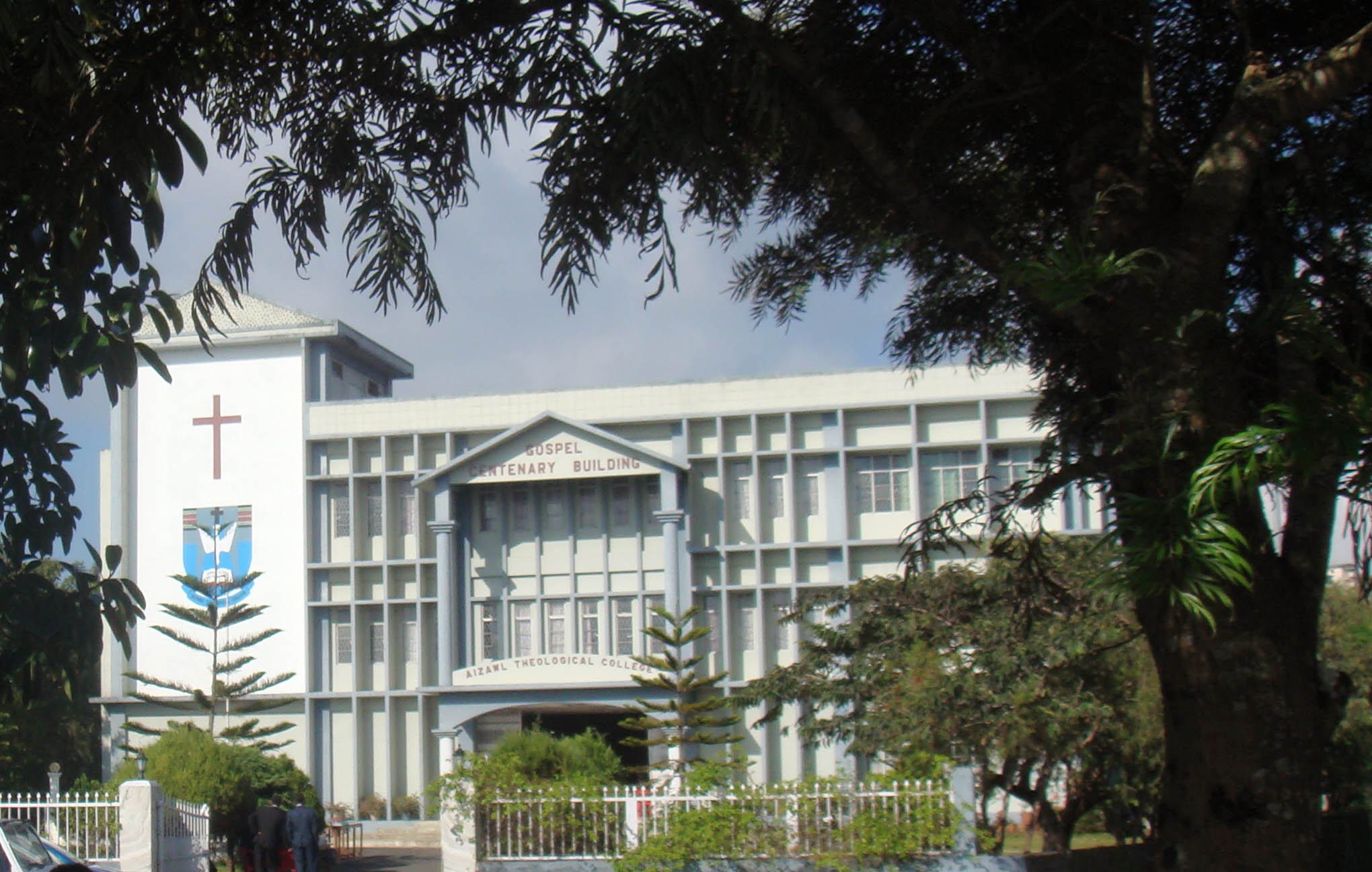
ATC, Mizoram

Christian Denominations in Mizoram (2024–25)
1. Mizoram Presbyterian Church (58.8%)
2. Baptist Church of Mizoram (16.3%)
3. United Pentecostal Church of North East India (7.63%)
4. United Pentecostal Church of Mizoram (6.32%)
5. The Salvation Army (5.74%)
6. others (5.21%)

Christianity is the largest religion in Mizoram. The majority 87% of Mizoram population are Christian in various denominations, predominantly Presbyterian. More than 98% of the Mizos are Christians by faith. The culture of Mizoram is mainly influenced by Christianity. Hence, Christianity was given a special status on the state by the government while maintaining a minimum level of secular environment and approach. In June 2018, the government of Mizoram including Vanlalruata, president of anti-corruption organisation-turned-political party, People's Representation for Identity and Status of Mizoram claim that Mizoram is a Christian state. Hindus form a small minority (3.55%) mainly of Manipuris and there are also around (7.93%) Buddhists according to the 2001 census, mostly made up from Chakma settlers of Arakan origin. There are about 8,000 mostly ethnic Mizo followers of a Judaic group Bnei Menashe, who claim descent from the biblical Menasseh. Muslims make up about 1.1% of the state population.

The major Christian denomination is the Mizoram Presbyterian Church, established by Rev. D.E. Jones, a missionary from the Presbyterian Church of Wales. The Mizoram Presbyterian Church is part of the larger Presbyterian Church of India. Other Christian churches include the Baptist Church of Mizoram, Roman Catholic Church, United Pentecostal Church, the Salvation Army, the Seventh-day Adventist Church, Kohhran Thianghlim, Evangelical Baptist Convention Church, Lairam Jesus Christ Baptist Church, and the Evangelical Church of Maraland, Independent Church of India and Evangelical Free Church of India.

== Statistics ==
Religion in Mizoram
Religion	Percent
Christianity	87.2%
Buddhism	8.51%
Hinduism	2.75%
Islam	1.35%
Others/not stated	0.23%

Christians in Mizoram
Year	Number	Percentage
2001	772,809	86.97
2011	956,331	87.16

Historical Christian Population in Mizoram
Year	Pop.	±%
1891	15	—
1901	45	+200.0%
1911	2,461	+5368.9%
1921	27,720	+1026.4%
1931	59,123	+113.3%
1941	47	−99.9%
1951	177,563	+377693.6%
1961	230,509	+29.8%
1971	286,141	+24.1%
1981	413,840	+44.6%
1991	591,342	+42.9%
2001	772,809	+30.7%
2011	956,331	+23.7%
Source: census of India

=== Trends ===
Percentage of Christians in Mizoram by decades

Year	Percent	Increase
1901	0.05%	-
1911	2.7%	+2.65%
1921	28.17%	+25.47%
1931	47.52%	+19.35%
1941	0.03%	-47.49%
1951	90.5%	+90.47%
1961	86.64%	-3.86%
1971	86.09%	-0.55%
1981	83.81%	-2.28%
1991	85.73%	+1.92%
2001	86.97%	+1.24%
2011	87.16%	+0.19%

=== Tribes ===
Percentage of Christians in the Scheduled Tribes

Tribe	Christians	Percent
Mizo (Lusei)	7,26,999	98.92%
Pawi	51,039	99.29%
Kuki	43,075	94.14%
Lakher	42,586	99.37%
Hmar	29,289	98.99%
Paite	22,950	98.99%
Chakma	7,121	7.34%

== See also ==
- List of Christian denominations in North East India
- History of Christianity in Mizoram
- Religion in Mizoram
