= Kohhran Thianghlim =

- The Holy Church
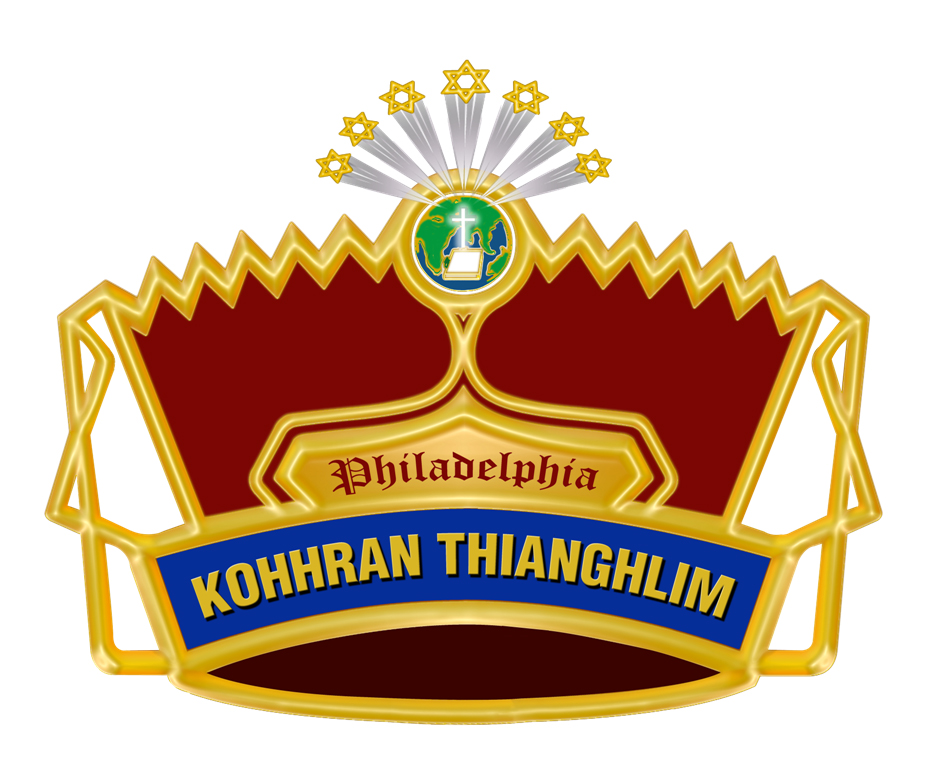
- Emblem of the church
- Kohhran Thianghlim
- 23.7461°N 92.6917°E
- Location: Chawlhhmun, Aizawl
- Country: India
- Denomination: Nondenominational Christianity

History
- Founded: 1984; 42 years ago
- Founder: Dr L.B. Sailo

Architecture
- Architect: Solomon's Temple

Kohhran Thianghlim (The Holy Church) is a Christian denomination in Mizoram, northeast India. It was founded by Dr L.B. Sailo (Lalbiakmawia Sailo) in 1984. The founder is a certified veterinary doctor working as the Director of Animal Husbandry and Veterinary Department, Government of Mizoram. It is headquartered in Aizawl at Chawlhhmun, where its Solomon's Temple is located. It is administered by the Executive Committee, which has subordinate boards to manage sectional activities. It is spread all over Mizoram with seven administrative divisions. It uses David's star as insignia on its flag, emblem and Temple.

== Administration ==
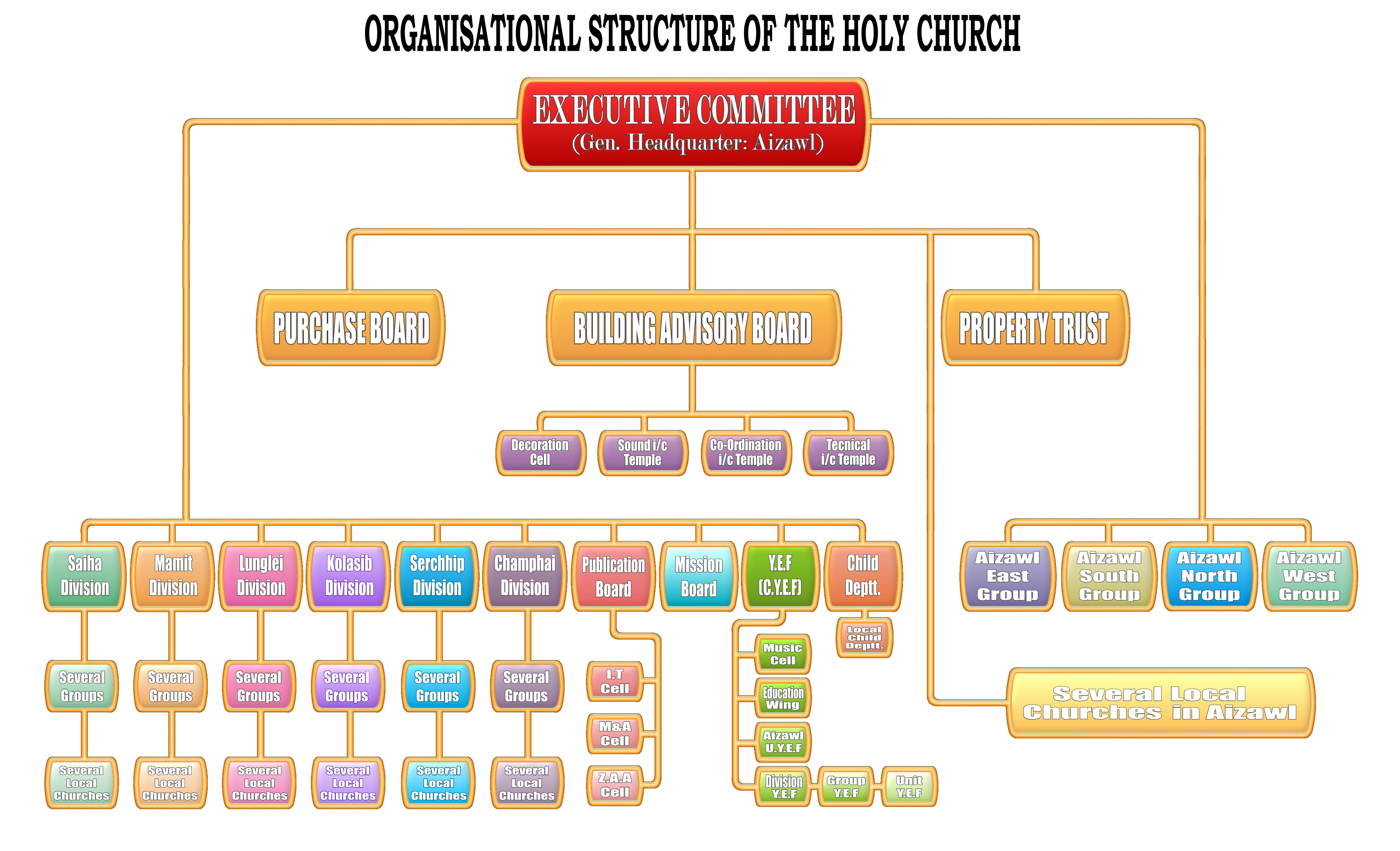
Organizational Structure of Kohhran Thianghlim

Aizawl is the general headquarters of the church and a seat of Executive Committee that is the highest body in spiritual and administrative matters. It is portrayed as spiritual Jerusalem for the elects (members of the church).

== Midnight Herald ==
The church publishes its bulletin Midnight Herald (Zanlai Au Aw). It is an evangelical fortnightly published in Mizo since 20 September 1998. It was registered on 21 June 2011 with the Registrar of Newspaper in India, RNI regn. No. MIZMIZ/2009/37924.

== Phileo ==
Phileo is the church official bulletin circulated weekly within the church domain. The publication was started on 1992.

== Solomon’s Temple ==
The church is constructing Solomon's Temple, Aizawl Mizoram, India at Kidron Valley, Chawlhhmun. Construction began on 11 January 1995, foundation stone laid on 23 December 1996 and works are taken up by Building Advisory Board. For its afforestation of Temple premise, the church was awarded Green Mizoram outstanding performance by the Government of Mizoram in 1999 and 2000. An annual convention named Jerusalem Khawmpui is held every year at the Temple in the last week of December.' Elects from different places gather for worshiping the Almighty God and as pilgrimage.

== Books ==
Publication Board of the church has published 14 books written in Mizo by Dr L.B. Sailo, and one book in English (Sl.No.-5 Mystery of Elects). The lists of books published along with the years of edition are:

1. Kraws leh Thlarau Thianghlim - 1983
2. Pathian Mihringa a Inpuanna Tluantling (Thlarauva Thawhlehna Ram) - 1984
3. Pathian Chatuan Thil Tum (Thlante Thuruk) - 1985, 1986, 1987, 1992 and 2004
4. Moneitu Au Aw (Thlante Thuruk) 1988, 1989 and 1992
5. The Mystery of Elects -1989
6. Khawngaihna Thutak (Kraws Thuruk)- 1990 and 1991
7. Lunghlu Kawngkhar Mawi (Kraws Thuruk) - 1992
8. Harh A Hun Ta ! (Booklet) - 1993
9. Chhandamna Lawng (Thlante Thuruk) - 1993 and 2010
10. Lal Isua : A Lo Kal Lehna - 1994 and 2011
11. Tunlai Khawvel leh Kristianna - 1994 and 1995
12. Kraws Daihlim (Testimony) - 1995
13. Kraws Daihlim (Thlante Thuruk) – 2005 and 2006
14. Nunna Tui Lui (Kraws Thuruk) - 2009

Publication Board of the Church is now a full-fledged publishing agency/firm registered under the International Standard Book Number (ISBN) Agency, United House, North Road, London, United Kingdom. It has recently been allotted Publisher's identifier under the ISBN system in category 5 (religious literature). (Ref.: Category 5/2014-ISBN, Dated 10.02.2014)

== Missionary ==
The church sends missionaries to different parts of Mizoram. The first batch of missionaries were officially anointed in 1995. They also act as officials/ministers during church official functions and sometimes as a shepherd for the members.

== Secretariat ==
It is located in Chawlhhmun, Aizawl. Superintendent is the head of administration and is the drawing and disbursing officer as well. All other functionaries like cashier, clerk, assistant, etc. work under his supervision. Church offset press runs in the same building. It is the headquarters of the Church's administration.

== Flag ==
Kohhran Thianghlim Flag

The official flag of the church is divided diagonally from the lower hoist corner to upper fly corner by a broad black band bearing seven white David's stars; the black band is edged in red stripe at the upper portion, blue stripe at the lower portion; the upper hoist-side triangle is sky-blue with a white cross imposed on it; the lower triangle is red.

== See also ==
- List of Christian denominations in North East India
