= Mamit district =

- District of Mizoram
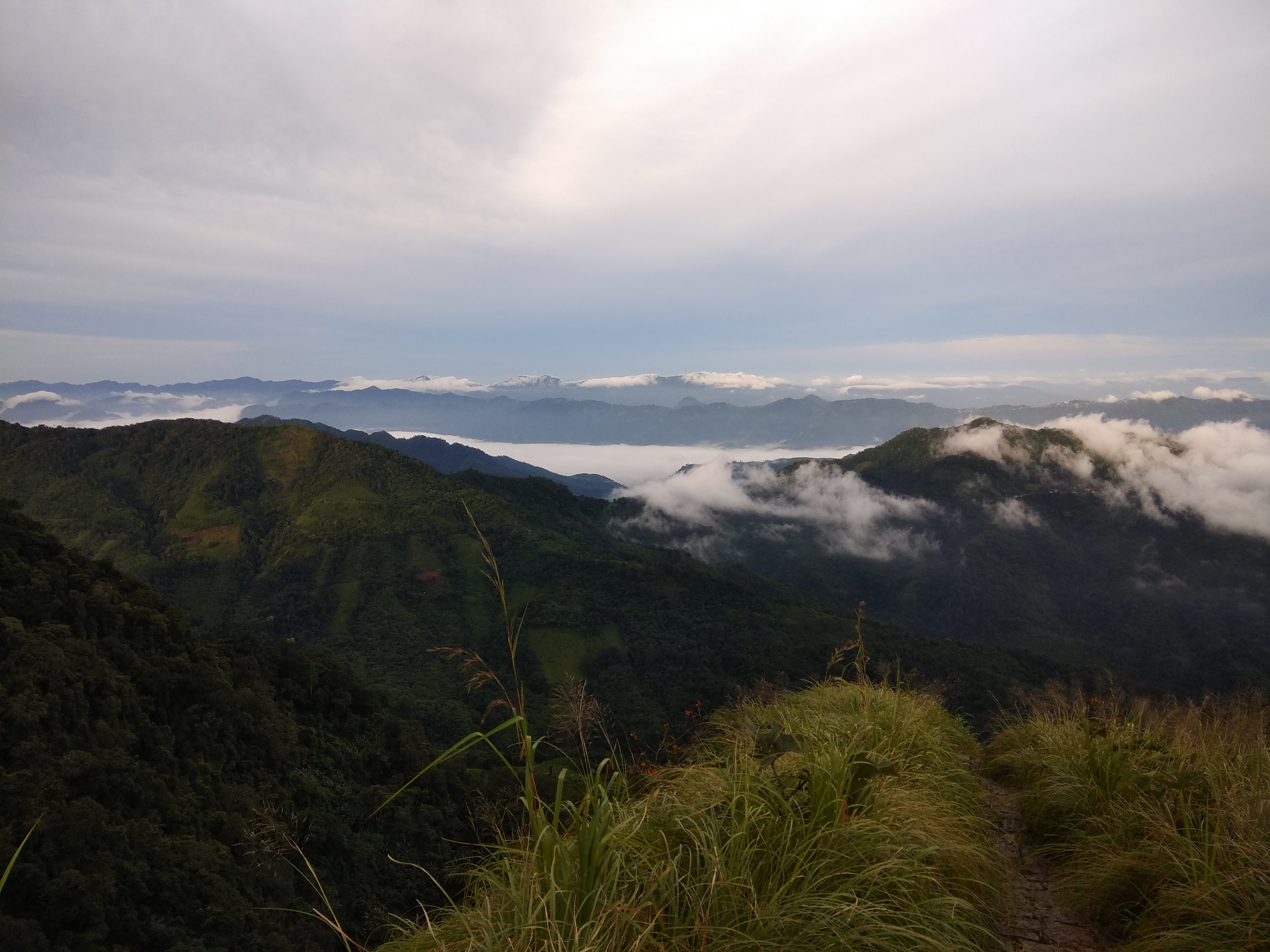
- View from Reiek top
- Interactive map of Mamit district
- Coordinates (Mamit): 23.925141°N 92.491368°E
- Country: India
- State: Mizoram
- Headquarters: Mamit

Government
  - Lok Sabha constituencies: Mizoram
  - Vidhan Sabha constituencies: 3

Area
  - Total: 3,025 km^{2} (1,168 sq mi)

Population (2011)
  - Total: 86,364
  - Density: 28.55/km^{2} (73.94/sq mi)

Demographics
  - Literacy: 84.93
  - Sex ratio: 927
- Time zone: UTC+05:30 (IST)
- Website: mamit.nic.in

Mamit district is one of the eleven districts of Mizoram state in India. The district headquarters is Mamit.

== Geography ==
The district is bounded on the north by Hailakandi district of Assam state, on the west by North Tripura district of Tripura state and Bangladesh, on the south by Lunglei district and on the east by Kolasib and Aizawl districts. The district occupies an area of 3025.75 km². Mamit town is the administrative headquarters of the district.

== Demographics ==
Historical population
Year	Pop.	±% p.a.
1971	30,311	—
1981	52,255	+5.60%
1991	64,572	+2.14%
2001	62,785	−0.28%
2011	86,364	+3.24%

Religions in Mamit district (2011)
Religion	Percent
Christianity	80.01%
Buddhism	14.27%
Hinduism	3.46%
Islam	2.06%
Other or not stated	0.20%

According to the 2011 census Mamit district has a population of 86,364, roughly equal to the nation of Andorra. This gives it a ranking of 618th in India (out of a total of 640). The district has a population density of 29 inhabitants per square kilometre (75/sq mi). Its population growth rate over the decade 2001–2011 was 37.56%. Mamit has a sex ratio of 927 females for every 1000 males, and a literacy rate of 84.93%. 17.25% of the population lives in urban areas. 95.04% of the population belongs to Scheduled Tribes.

Languages spoken in Mamit district (2011)
1. Mizo (62.6%)
2. Tripuri (17.6%)
3. Chakma (15.2%)
4. Bengali (1.92%)
5. Others (2.58%)

According to the 2011 census, 62.61% of the population spoke Mizo, 17.64% Tripuri, 15.25% Chakma and 1.92% Bengali as their first language.

== Economy ==
Indian has set up several Border Haats (markets) and ICP (Integrated Check Posts) in Mizoram to boost the border trade and Look-East connectivity to Trans-Asian Railway and Asian Highway Network (via AH1). Marpara and Tuipuibari on Bangladesh–India border are two ICP in Mamit district.

== Flora and fauna ==
In 1985 Mamit district became home to Dampa Tiger Reserve, which has an area of 500 km².
