= Tawi Wildlife Sanctuary =

Wildlife sanctuary in Mizoram, India

- IUCN category IV (habitat/species management area)
- Location within Mizoram Location within India
- Interactive map of Tawi Wildlife Sanctuary
- Location: Aizawl / Serchhip / Lunglei district, Mizoram, India
- Nearest city: Aizawl
- Coordinates: 23°32′6″N 92°57′0″E
- Area: 35.75 km^{2} (13.80 sq mi)
- Designation: Wildlife sanctuary
- Established: 16 November 2001 (notification)
- Governing body: Forest Department, Government of Mizoram

Tawi Wildlife Sanctuary is a wildlife sanctuary located in the Indian state of Mizoram. It was among the first protected wildlife areas in the state, notified under the provisions of the Wildlife (Protection) Act, 1972.

== Location and geography ==
The sanctuary lies roughly 101 km from the state capital, Aizawl, and spans districts including Aizawl, Serchhip and partly Lunglei. The elevation ranges from about 400 m to 1,300 m above sea level. The sanctuary terrain is largely hilly, with steep slopes and rugged terrain, forming part of the hill forest ecosystem of Mizoram.

== History ==
The area was notified as a wildlife sanctuary on 16 November 2001, vide Notification No. B.12012/1/91-FST by the state government of Mizoram. Tawi is considered among the oldest wildlife sanctuaries of Mizoram.

== Flora and fauna ==
Tawi Wildlife Sanctuary harbours tropical evergreen and semi-evergreen forests, as well as scrub and secondary forest in parts.

According to a botanical survey, the sanctuary supports a rich pteridophytic flora: 37 taxa of ferns and fern allies have been recorded. Among the tree and plant species present are tropical trees, bamboos and orchids, reflecting the diversity of habitats within the sanctuary.

Notable carnivores recorded in the sanctuary include the Tiger (Sakei), Leopard (Keite), Golden cat (Keisen), Leopard cat (Sanghar), Marbled cat (Ngharrang), Jungle cat (Sauak), Himalayan black bear (Savawm), Malayan sun bear (Samang), Jackal (Sihal), Civets (Sazaw) and the Yellow-throated marten (Safia). Among ungulates and similar terrestrial species, the sanctuary is home to the Serow (Saza) and Ghoral (Sathar).

The forest canopy supports several arboreal mammals including the Hoolock gibbon (Hauhuk), Leaf monkey (Dawr), Common langur (Ngau), Assamese macaque (Zozawng), Slow loris (Sahuai) and the Pig-tailed macaque (Zawng hmeltha).

Important birds recorded from the area include the Great Indian hornbill (Vapual), Wreathed hornbill (Kawlhawk), Pied hornbill (Vahai), Khalij pheasant (Vahrit), Bhutan peacock pheasant (Varihaw), White-cheeked partridge (Varung), Red jungle fowl (Ramar) and the Imperial pigeon (Bullut).

== Visitor information ==
The sanctuary is accessible from Aizawl, and is often cited as a destination for forest walks, bird watching and nature experiences.

== See also ==
- Protected areas of India
- Thorangtlang Wildlife Sanctuary
