= United Pentecostal Church in India =

United Pentecostal Church is a major Christian denomination in India belonging to the United Pentecostal Church International. It was established in the mid-20th century.

== See also ==
- Adivasi
- Christianity in India
