= Hmar =

Hmar may refer to:

- Hmar people, in northeastern India
- Hmaric languages, spoken by the Hmar people
  - Hmar language, the main Tibeto-Burman language of the Hmar
