= Saiphai =

Village in Kolasib district, Mizoram, India

- Village
- Country: India
- State: Mizoram
- District: Kolasib district
- Block: Bilkhawthlir

Area
  - Total: 10.39 km^{2} (4.01 sq mi)

Population (2011)
  - Total: 2,052
  - Density: 197.5/km^{2} (511.5/sq mi)

Languages
  - Official: Mizo
- Time zone: UTC+5:30 (IST)
- PIN: 796101
- Vehicle registration: MZ

Saiphai is a Hmar village located in the Kolasib district of Mizoram, India. It falls under the Bilkhawthlir Rural Development Block, Pin code 796101.

== Demographics ==
According to the 2011 Census of India, Saiphai had a population of 2052 people living in 356 households. The village had a literacy rate of 95.36%.

== Saiphai village council members (2025-2030) ==
Saiphai village council members (2025-2030)
Position	Name
President	Lalthansanga
Vice President	Lathlirlien Hmar
Secretary	Lalchawimawia Chhangte
Treasurer	James Ramnghillo
Member	Zadinliana Hmar
Member	Lalbiakmawii
Member	Pentecost Lalfakzuala
Member	Lalrinfeli
