= Lunglei district =

- District of Mizoram
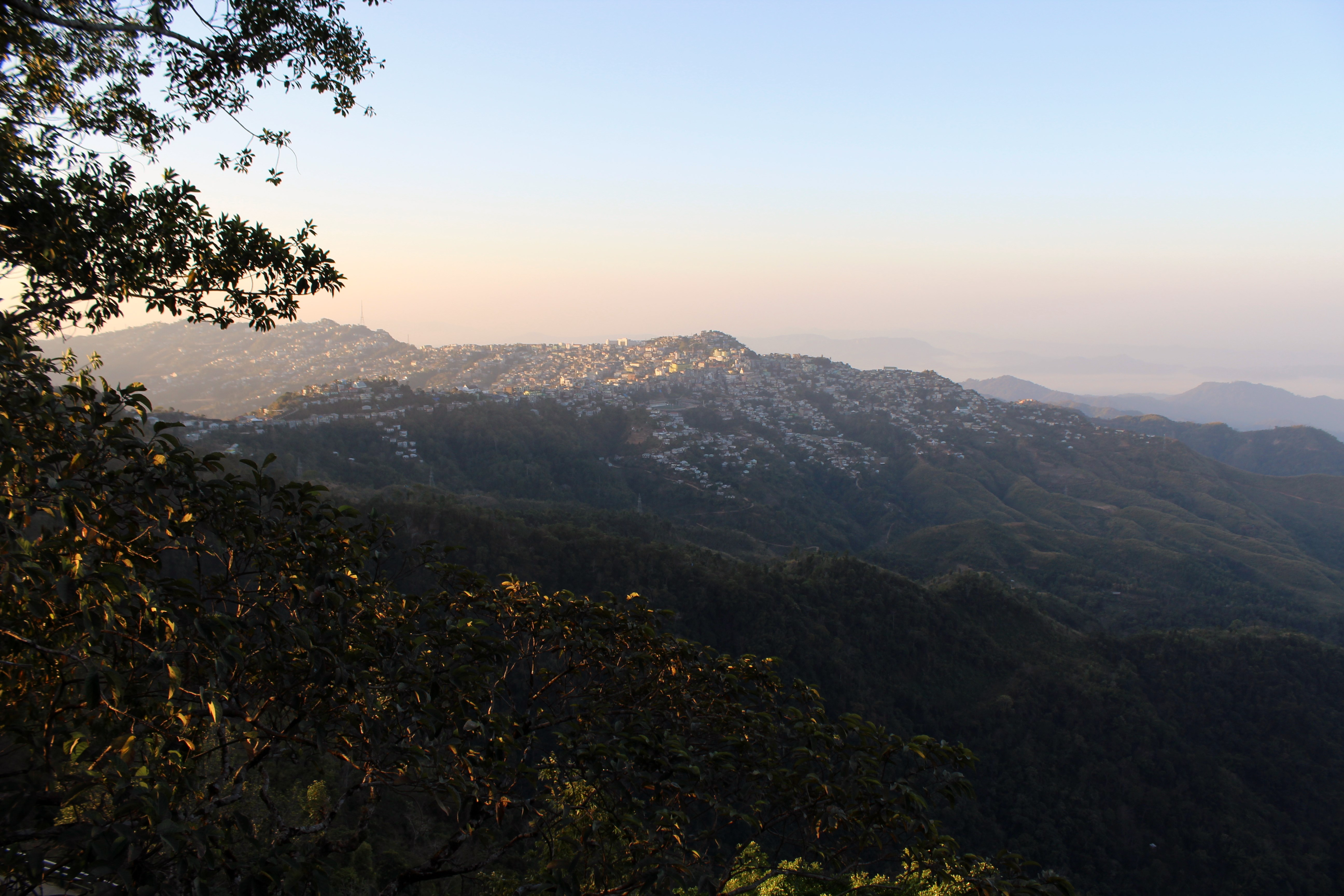
- View of Lunglei town
- Interactive map of Lunglei district
- Coordinates (Lunglei): 22°57′N 92°38′E
- Country: India
- State: Mizoram
- Headquarters: Lunglei

Government
  - Deputy Commissioner: Navneet Mann, IAS
  - Lok Sabha constituencies: Mizoram
  - Vidhan Sabha constituencies: 7

Area
  - Total: 4,536 km^{2} (1,751 sq mi)

Population (2001)
  - Total: 161,428
  - Density: 35.59/km^{2} (92.17/sq mi)

Demographics
  - Literacy: 88.86
  - Sex ratio: 947
- Time zone: UTC+05:30 (IST)
- Website: lunglei.nic.in

Lunglei district is one of the eleven districts of Mizoram state in India. As of 2011, it is the second most populous district in the state, after Aizawl. The district headquarters is Lunglei.

== History ==
In August 1897, the missionary David Evan Jones visited the Lushai Hills. He came to Lunglei for Christmas of that year, spending the season in the hamlet of Pukpui. Sufficient Christian influence remained in the area that during World War II, inhabitants of the village held prayer services in churches.

== Demographics ==
Historical population
Year	Pop.	±% p.a.
1971	60,403	—
1981	86,511	+3.66%
1991	111,415	+2.56%
2001	137,223	+2.11%
2011	161,428	+1.64%

According to the 2011 census Lunglei district has a population of 161,428, roughly equal to the nation of Saint Lucia. This gives it a ranking of 597th in India (out of a total of 640). The district has a population density of 36 inhabitants per square kilometre (93/sq mi). Its population growth rate over the decade 2001-2011 was 17.64%. Lunglei has a sex ratio of 947 females for every 1000 males, and a literacy rate of 88.86%.

Religions in Lunglei district (2011)
Religion	Percent
Christianity	74.39%
Buddhism	20.70%
Hinduism	3.87%
Islam	0.87%
Other or not stated	0.17%

After division of Lunglei district, the residual district has a population of 132,960, of which 61,565 (46.30%) live in urban areas. The residual district has a sex ratio of 936 females per 1000 males. Scheduled Tribes make up 125,449 (94.35%) of the population.

Languages spoken in Lunglei district (2011)
1. Mizo (66.5%)
2. Chakma (24.9%)
3. Tripuri (3.55%)
4. Bengali (1.41%)
5. Hindi (1.40%)
6. Others (2.31%)

According to the 2011 census, 66.48% of the population spoke Mizo, 24.85% Chakma, 3.55% Tripuri, 15.25% Chakma, 1.41% Bengali and 1.40% Hindi as their first language.

== Wildlife ==
The district has 2 wildlife sanctuaries- Khawnglung Wildlife sanctuary and Thorangtlang Wildlife Sanctuary.

== Notable Persons ==
Notable persons from Lunglei.

- Roliana Ralte
- C. Lalzarmawia
- Pensy B. Lalthangliana
- Bethsy Lalrinsangi
- Siamthangi Hauhnar
- R.K. Lalhluna
- Lalzova
- Ṭhuamluaia
- Ramhluna Hnamte
- Lallianzuala Chhangte
- Mapuia Chongthu

== See also ==
- Tokalo wildlife sanctuary
