= Mamit, India =

Mamit
- town
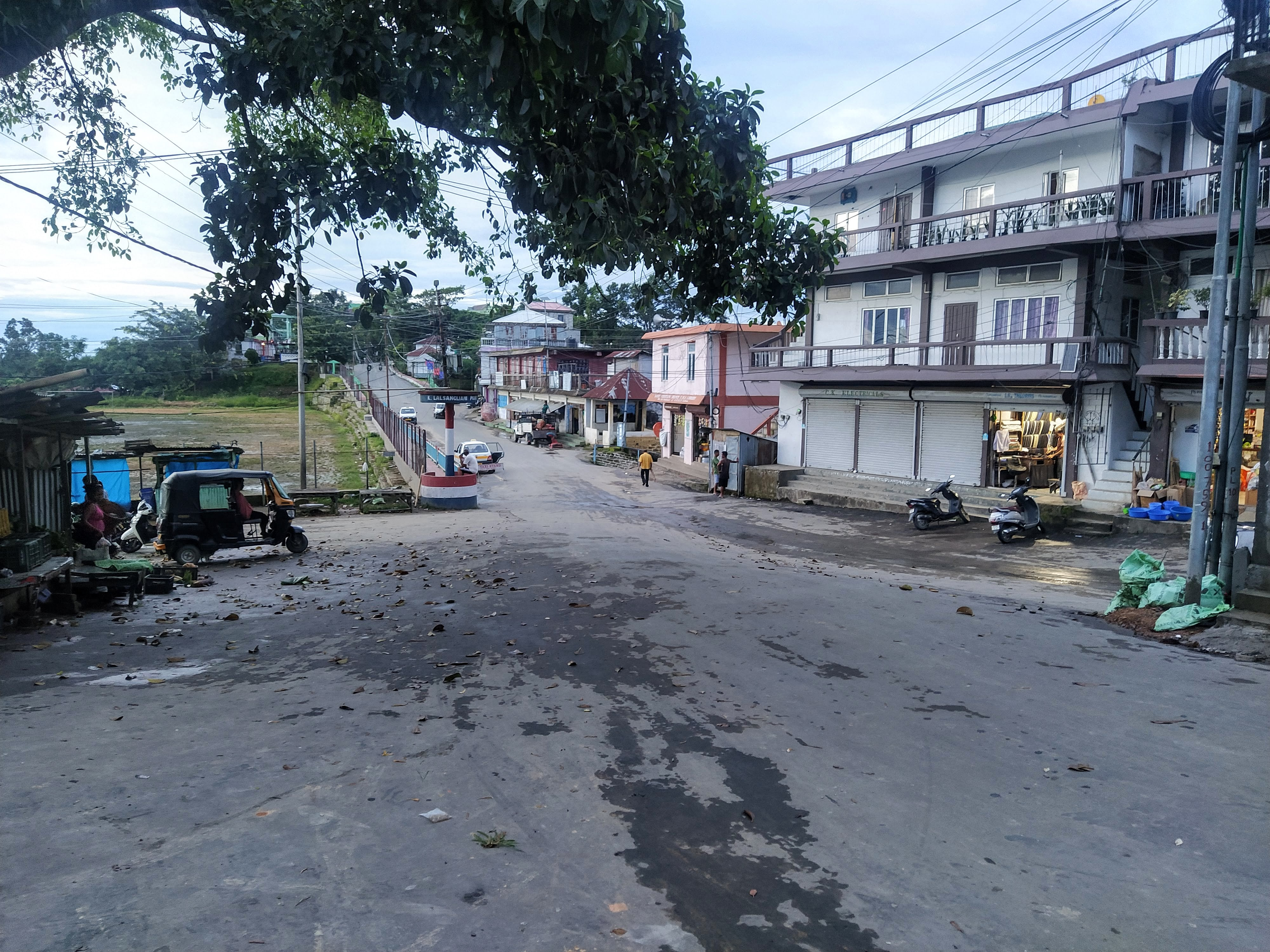

- Location within Mizoram Location within India
- Coordinates: 23.93°N 92.48°E
- Country: India
- State: Mizoram
- District: Mamit
- Elevation: 718 m (2,356 ft)

Population (2001)
  - Total: 5,261

Languages
  - Official: Mizo
- Time zone: UTC+5:30 (IST)
- Vehicle registration: MZ
- Climate: Cwa
- Website: mizoram.nic.in

Mamit is a census town in Mamit district in the Indian state of Mizoram.

== Geography ==
Mamit is located at 23.93°N 92.48°E.

== Demographics ==
As of 2011 India census, Mamit had a population of 7884, in which 4074 are male while 3810 are female.

== Media ==
The Major Newspapers in Mamit are:

- Mamit Times
