= The Salvation Army in India =

The Salvation Army is a major Christian denomination in India. Its work includes work with addicted persons. It has more than 300,000 members. It has 9 hospitals and more than 100 schools. Its national secretariat is in Kolkata, West Bengal.

The Salvation Army in India is divided into territories:-

- South Eastern Territory is for parts of Tamil Nadu and the whole of Puducherry.
- Central Territory is for Andhra Pradesh, Karnataka and part of Tamil Nadu.
- Eastern Territory is for Arunachal Pradesh, Assam, Manipur, Meghalaya, Mizoram, Nagaland, Sikkim, Tripura, (part of) West Bengal and the Kingdom of Bhutan.
- Northern Territory includes the states of Bihar, Chhattisgarh, Haryana, Himachal Pradesh, Jammu and Kashmir, Orissa, Punjab, Uttar Pradesh, Uttarakhand, (part of) West Bengal, the Delhi, Chandigarh, the Andaman Islands and the Nicobar Islands.
- South Western Territory equals Kerala.
- Western Territory covers Gujarat, Maharashtra, Madhya Pradesh and Rajasthan.
