= Thorangtlang Wildlife Sanctuary =

Wildlife sanctuary in Mizoram, India

- IUCN category IV (habitat/species management area)
- Location within Mizoram Location within India
- Interactive map of Thorangtlang Wildlife Sanctuary
- Location: Lunglei district, Mizoram, India
- Nearest city: Lunglei
- Coordinates: 23°18′N 92°33′E
- Area: 50 km^{2} (19 sq mi)
- Designation: Wildlife sanctuary
- Established: 23 April 2002; 2 November 2015 (updated notification); eco-sensitive zone notified 25 June 2019
- Governing body: Department of Environment & Forests, Government of Mizoram

Thorangtlang Wildlife Sanctuary (also spelled Thorangtland) is a wildlife sanctuary located in Lunglei district in the Indian state of Mizoram. It preserves subtropical evergreen and semi-evergreen forest ecosystems and lies close to the India–Bangladesh border.

== Location and geography ==
The sanctuary occupies hilly terrain in southern Mizoram, south of Aizawl and near Lunglei town. Elevations reach about 1,396 m, and the area forms part of the Naga–Mizoram mountain biogeographic zone. The region receives high annual rainfall and is drained by several small streams.

== History ==
The forest tract was first recorded as Reserve Forest in 1982. A state notification declared part of it as Thorangtlang Wildlife Sanctuary on 23 April 2002, with an area of 50 km^{2}. A subsequent notification on 2 November 2015 revised the sanctuary's recorded area to 180.0 km^{2}. In June 2019, an eco-sensitive zone surrounding the sanctuary was formalised by the Government of India.

== Flora and fauna ==
The sanctuary acts as a corridor for the migration of elephants from Bangladesh.

Important wild animals of the region include the Barking deer (Sakhi), Gaur/Indian bison (Ramsial), Himalayan black bear, Hoolock gibbon (Hauhuk), Leaf monkey (Dawr), Leopard (Keite), Rhesus macaque (Zawng), Sambar (Sazuk), Tiger (Sakei), and Wild boar (Sanghal); while notable birds comprise the Bhutan peacock pheasant (Varihaw), Great Indian hornbill (Vapual), Imperial pigeon (Bullut), Khalij pheasant (Vahrit), Pied hornbill (Vahai), Red jungle fowl (Ramar), and Wreathed hornbill (Kawlhawk).

A study in the Journal of Threatened Taxa documented 36 species of pteridophytes (ferns and fern-allies) within the sanctuary.

== Conservation and management ==
Thorangtlang Wildlife Sanctuary is administered by the Forest Department of Mizoram. The eco-sensitive zone notified in 2019 aims to regulate development around the boundary and reduce pressure on the habitat. Recent management guidelines highlight community participation, scientific wildlife monitoring and habitat protection as priorities.

== Visitor information ==
The sanctuary is accessible from Lunglei. Entry permissions and visitor arrangements are available through the Mizoram Forest Department and state tourism services.

== See also ==
- Protected areas of India
- Kathlaur Kushlian Wildlife Sanctuary
