= Kolasib =

- Town
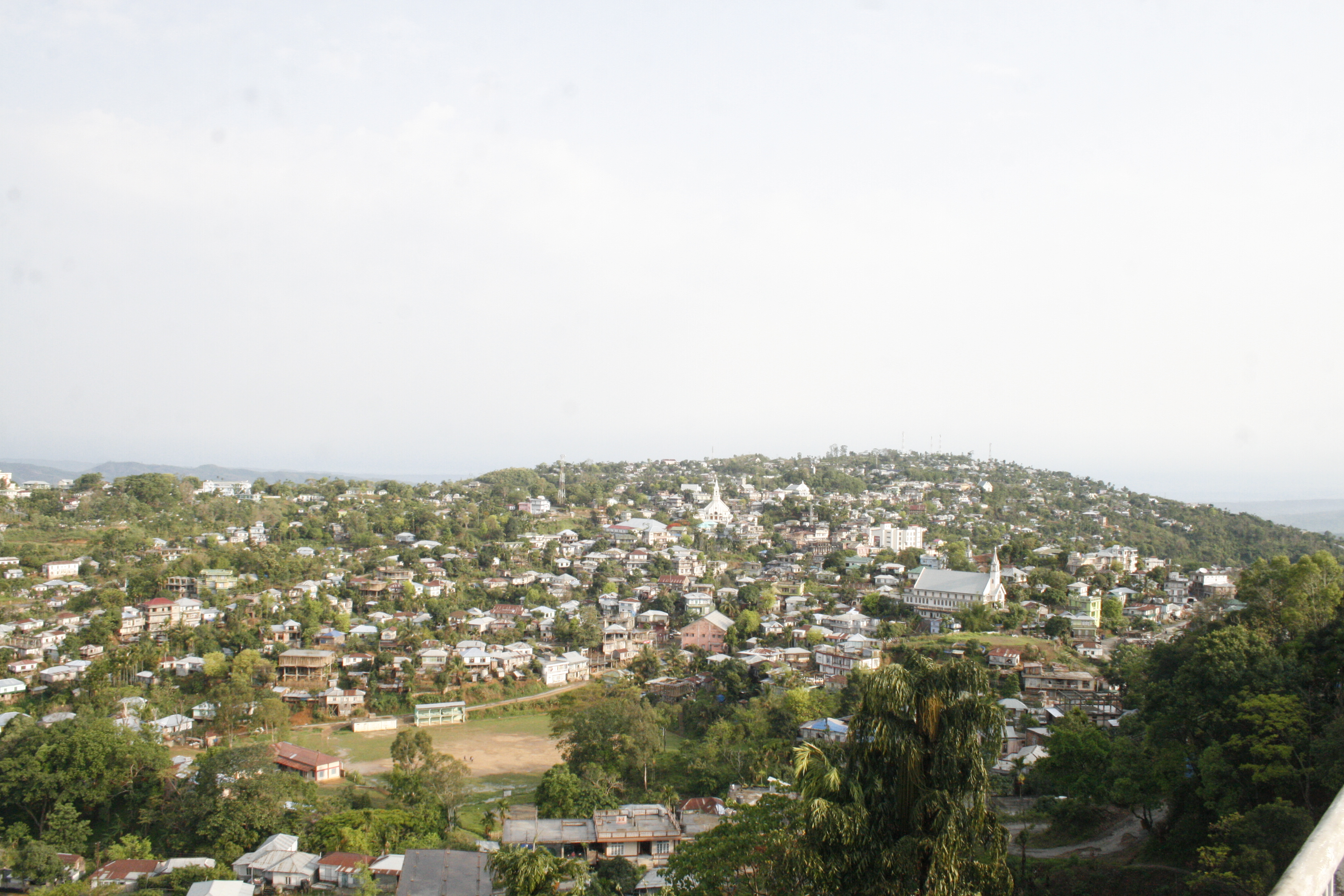
- Kolasib, mizoram
- Interactive map of Kolasib
- Location within Mizoram Location within India
- Coordinates: 24.2274°N 92.6789°E
- Country: India
- State: Mizoram
- District: Kolasib

Government
  - Body: District Collector : John LT Sanga
- Elevation: 888 m (2,913 ft)

Population (2023)
  - Total: 34,200

Languages
  - Official: Mizo
- Time zone: UTC+5:30 (IST)
- PIN: 796081
- Vehicle registration: MZ 05
- Climate: Cwa
- Website: mizoram.nic.in

Kolasib is a town located in the northern part of Mizoram, India. It serves as the headquarters of the Kolasib District. Situated along the border with the state of Assam, Kolasib is an important transit point connecting Mizoram with the rest of India. The town is known for its strategic location and serves as a gateway to Mizoram from the neighboring state.

== Demographics ==
As of the 2011 Census of India, Kolasib district had a population of 83,670

== Economy ==
Kolasib is an agriculture-dominated economy with a few service sector jobs, as it is a district capital. A large number of people cultivate betel nut, oil palms, rice, wheat and fish which are both consumed and exported to other districts of Mizoram.

== Transport ==
A helicopter service by Pawan Hans has been started which connects the Aizawl with Kolasib. The distance between Kolasib and Aizawl through NH 54 is 83 km and is connected with regular service of bus and Maxi-Cabs.

== Media ==
The Major Newspapers in Kolasib are:

- Duhlai Daily
- Ramnuam
- Kolasib Times
- Kolasib Today
- Turnipui
- Chhuahtlang Daily
- Vairengte Aw:
- Kolasib Aw
- Zingtian Daily
- Rengkhawpui
- Zoram Kanaan

Major Television Cable Network in Kolasib are:

- Kolasib Cable Network (KCN)
- C.Zakhuma Cable Network (CZS)
