= Kolasib district =

- District of Mizoram
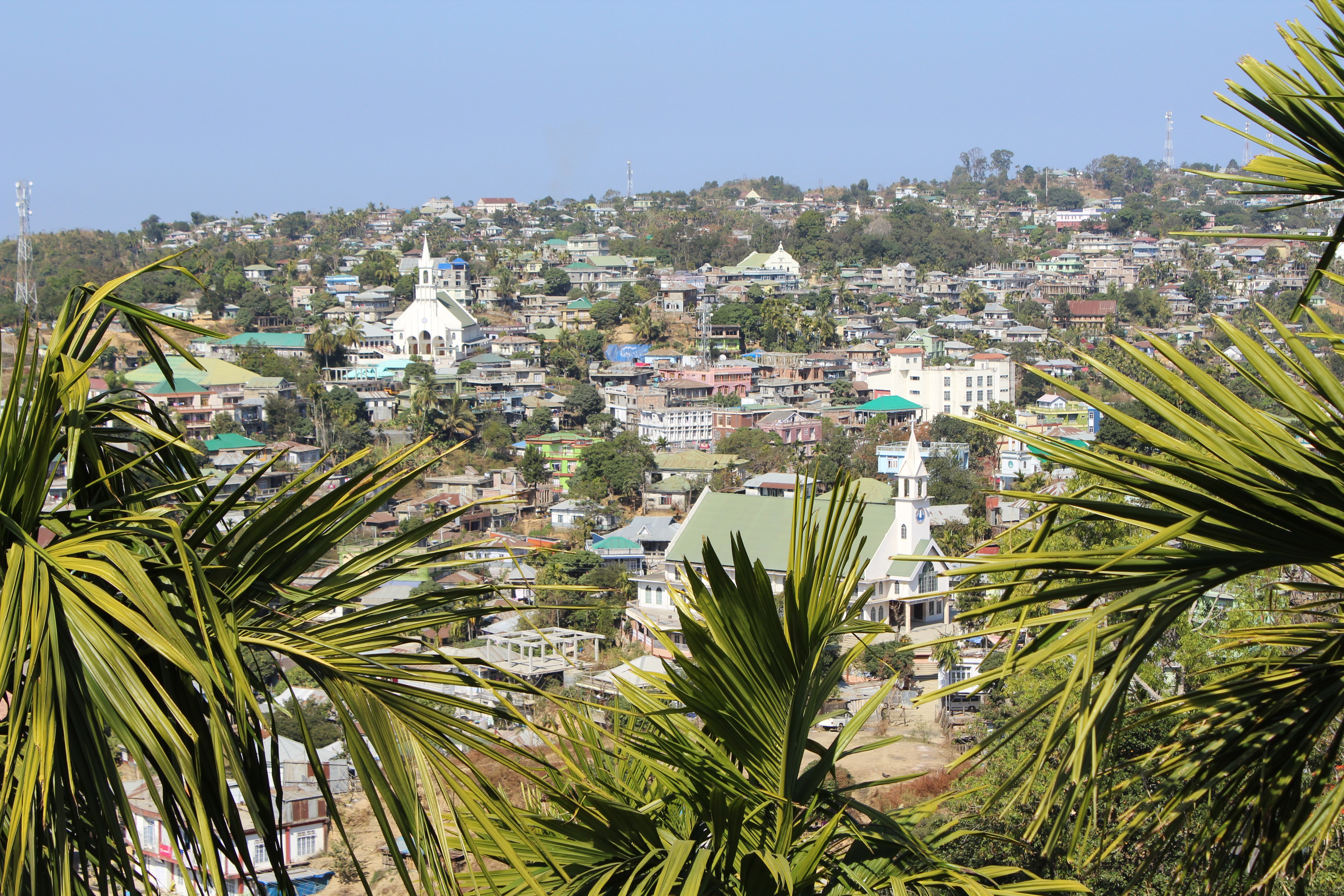
- View of Kolasib
- Interactive map of Kolasib district
- Coordinates (Kolasib): 24.22°N 92.68°E
- Country: India
- State: Mizoram
- Headquarters: Kolasib

Government
  - Lok Sabha constituencies: Mizoram
  - Vidhan Sabha constituencies: 3

Area
  - Total: 1,382.51 km^{2} (533.79 sq mi)

Population (2011)
  - Total: 83,955
  - Density: 60.727/km^{2} (157.28/sq mi)

Demographics
  - Literacy: 93.50
  - Sex ratio: 956
- Time zone: UTC+05:30 (IST)
- Website: kolasib.nic.in

Kolasib district is one of the eleven districts of Mizoram state in India. The district headquarters is Kolasib.

== Geography ==
=== Hydrology ===
Kolasib district has one completed Dam, Serlui B Dam and two under construction Bairabi Dam and Tuirial Dam Construction recommenced in September 2011.

== Demographics ==
Historical population
Year	Pop.	±% p.a.
1971	26,983	—
1981	38,432	+3.60%
1991	48,769	+2.41%
2001	65,960	+3.07%
2011	83,955	+2.44%

Religions in Kolasib district (2011)
Religion	Percent
Christianity	89.58%
Islam	5.27%
Hinduism	4.76%
Other or not stated	0.39%

According to the 2011 census Kolasib district has a population of 84,067, roughly equal to the nation of Andorra. This gives it a ranking of 621th in India (out of a total of 641). The district has a population density of 61 inhabitants per square kilometre (160/sq mi). Its population growth rate over the decade 2001–2011 was 27.28%. Kolasib has a sex ratio of 956 females for every 1000 males, and a literacy rate of 93.50%. 55.84% of the population lives in urban areas. Scheduled Tribes make up 87.67% of the population.

Languages spoken in Kolasib district (2011)
1. Mizo (75.9%)
2. Hmar (7.56%)
3. Bengali (5.30%)
4. Tripuri (4.63%)
5. Nepali (1.90%)
6. Hindi (1.33%)
7. Others (3.35%)

According to the 2011 census, 75.93% of the population spoke Mizo, 7.56% Hmar, 5.30% Bengali, 4.63% Tripuri, 1.90% Nepali and 1.33% Hindi as their first language.

== Wildlife ==
The Pualreng Wildlife Sanctuary is a wildlife sanctuary in the district. It was created on 2004 and covers approximately 50 km².

== See also ==
- Pualreng Wildlife Sanctuary
