= Mim Kut =

Mizo-Kuki festival for the deceased

Mim Kût
- Also called: Festival of the Dead, Job's tears'Festival
- Observed by: Mizo people, Kuki people, Zo people in Mizoram, Nagaland, and adjoining regions
- Type: Cultural, Harvest festival, Ancestor worship
- Significance: Honoring deceased ancestors and celebrating the harvest of mim (Job’s tears)
- Celebrations: Offerings to ancestors, feasting, singing, drinking rice beer, cleaning graves, ritual songs
- Date: August–September (in Mizoram; sometimes January in other regions)
- Frequency: Annual
- Related to: Pawl Kut, Chapchar Kut, Day of the Dead

Mim Kût (also known as Tahna Kut; transl. Festival of weeping) is one of the principal traditional festivals of the Zo people (including the Mizo people) of Mizoram, Nagaland, and adjoining regions in India and Myanmar. The festival is generally celebrated in August or September, coinciding with the harvest of maize and other "mim" crops such as Job’s tears (Coix lacryma-jobi) and millets.

== Etymology ==
Mim refers to the local Mizo name of the grain known as Job's tears that is harvested for the festival. Mim is harvested between August and September and is used as a reserve food stock in the absence of traditional rice paddies. Kut means festival in Mizo. Mim Kût is thus named after the grains of the harvest period; otherwise, it is formally known as Tahna kut (transl. festival of weeping) to commemorate the spirits and ancestors of the dead.

== Observance ==
The festival does not have a fixed date. According to the traditional Mizo calendar system, the festival must be held in the month of Mim Kût thla (transl. Month of Mim Festival). The days of the festival were placed with discretion of the chief and his upas. The date decreed would be publicly announced by the tlangau (transl. village crier) in order to prepare for the onset of the festival. Families would prepare rice paddies to be used in manufacturing Zu (Rice beer). Crops for the worship of ancestors would also be arranged within this time frame. The festival is four days long. The first day consists of rituals and offerings before partaking in the consumption of zu. The next three days would see no merrymaking or enjoyment, with residents of the village remaining at home for the mourning process. No work, play or arguments could be had.

Families offer the first fruits of the harvest, rice beer (zu), vegetables, and other foods to the spirits of deceased relatives. A symbolic bundle called Thlai Chhiah is placed in honor of the departed. This can be further extended to giving clothes and necklaces too. The food is normally cooked and is placed on a raised platform known as tuium hum hmun where bamboo water container were typically kept. The offering of food would normally be performed by the head of the house. The souls of the dead would be considered to partake in the meal. An extra seat would be left for the soul at meal time and allocated meal portions were assigned to them. This festival also believed that until upon death a soul remained in the village until after the festival. A separation ceremony known as inthen would be performed to send the soul to pialral or Mitthi khua. While there is communal feasting, the mood is subdued, focusing on remembrance rather than merrymaking. Lamentation songs are sung, and rituals are performed to honor ancestors and seek blessings for the coming year. Families also clean and decorate the graves of their loved ones as a mark of respect.

== Origin ==
Mim Kût is widely regarded as the oldest festival of the Zo people, originally observed as a solemn ceremony in memory of deceased relatives. Traditionally, the festival was held at the end of the harvest season for these crops, marking the period when the spirits of the deceased were believed to visit their families before departing for the afterlife.

The factual origin of the festival is unknown, but Mizo folklore asserts a legend regarding its beginning. The story revolves around two lovers, Tlingi and Ngama. They would meet in hillocks as lovers. However, due to tribal warfare, the lovers had to meet in secret and not give away their position in the bushes. Tlingi found a spot in the forest and waited for Ngama, staying out of view of the other tribesmen. Ngama himself sat next to Tlingi but did not observe her in the bushes. Both lovers continued to wait upon each other for months. Tlingi died of love-sickness, and Ngama planted flower-bearing trees at her grave. Ngama became thin and refused to eat in mourning for Tlingi. During an intense hunger experience, Ngama observed Tlingi in Mittihi Khua. Tlingi's house in the afterlife required repairs and Ngama went to the forest of the afterlife to aid her with materials. Trees which were small to Ngama were seen as big to Tlingi. This led to Ngama's realisation that the mortal world's resources are multiplied for spirits. When he recovered from his hunger experience of meeting Tlingi, Ngama promised to feed Tlingi the crops from his field. According to this legend, the Mizos feed their ancestors food for this reason and legend.

On the other hand, according to Kuki folklore, the festival’s origin is linked to the story of two brothers, Lendou and his younger sibling, who were abandoned by their mother and survived on mim grains. This narrative underscores themes of kinship, survival, and gratitude.

== Modern observance ==
With the advent of Christianity in Mizoram in the late 19th century,Mim Kût's traditional rituals declined, as Christian doctrine placed less emphasis on ancestral rites. However, in recent years, there has been a revival of interest in Mim Kût as part of broader efforts to preserve Mizo heritage. Some churches and cultural organizations have reintroduced symbolic elements of the festival, such as bringing agricultural produce for communal sharing and cultural education.

Today, Mim Kût is celebrated in parts of Mizoram, Nagaland, and among diaspora communities, often as a cultural or folkloric event rather than a strictly religious one. The festival promotes unity, cultural identity, and the remembrance of ancestors, and is sometimes featured in tourism and cultural programs.

== See also ==
- Chapchar Kut
- Pawl Kut
- Mizo culture

== Sources ==
- Sangkima (2004). Essays on the History of the Mizos. Guwahati: Spectrum Publications. ISBN 81-87502-77-0.
- Manglik, Rohit (2023). Tribal Cultures of India. EduGorilla Publication.
