= Pawl Kut =

Mizo harvest festival

Pâwl Kût
- Also called: Straw Harvest Festival
- Observed by: Mizo people in Mizoram, India
- Type: Cultural, harvest festival
- Significance: Thanksgiving for the completion of the rice harvest
- Celebrations: Feasting on meat and eggs, the chawnghnawt ritual of mothers and children feeding one another, folk dances and songs, community gatherings
- Date: December (sometimes January)
- Frequency: Annual
- Related to: Chapchar Kut, Mim Kut, Thalfavang Kut

Pâwl Kût, also spelled Pawl Kut, is a post-harvest festival of the Mizo people of Mizoram, India, celebrated in December or, in some communities, January once all the rice and other crops have been brought in. The name is generally explained as a compound of the Mizo words pawl, meaning "straw", and kut, meaning "festival", and the festival is accordingly often glossed in English as the "festival of straw" or "straw harvest festival". Together with Chapchar Kut (the spring festival) and Mim Kut (the maize and remembrance festival), it is one of the three principal kuts of the traditional Mizo agricultural year.

By long-standing oral tradition, the festival is said to have originated several centuries ago when a Mizo community recovering from a two-year famine was blessed with a bumper harvest in the third year, and gave thanks with a communal feast that later settled into an annual observance. Pâwl Kût is typically held over two days, sometimes extending to three, and centres on a household feast in which meat and eggs are the principal foods. Its most distinctive ritual is the chawnghnawt (also spelled chhawnghnawh), in which mothers and their children sit together on a specially built platform and feed one another portions of meat and egg as an expression of family bonds. Communal singing, folk dances and traditional games accompany the feasting.

In the modern era, Pâwl Kût is observed both in villages and in urban centres including Aizawl, where it is marked by official cultural programmes and is promoted by the Government of Mizoram as part of the state's cultural heritage; the Directorate of Information and Public Relations notes that nearly all the major Mizo festivals revolve around the agricultural cycle, of which Pâwl Kût marks the closing thanksgiving.

== See also ==
- Mizo culture
- Chapchar Kut
- Mim Kut
- Thalfavang Kut
- Kut (festival)
- Mizo people
