= Cheraw (dance) =

Mizo traditional bamboo dance from Mizoram, India

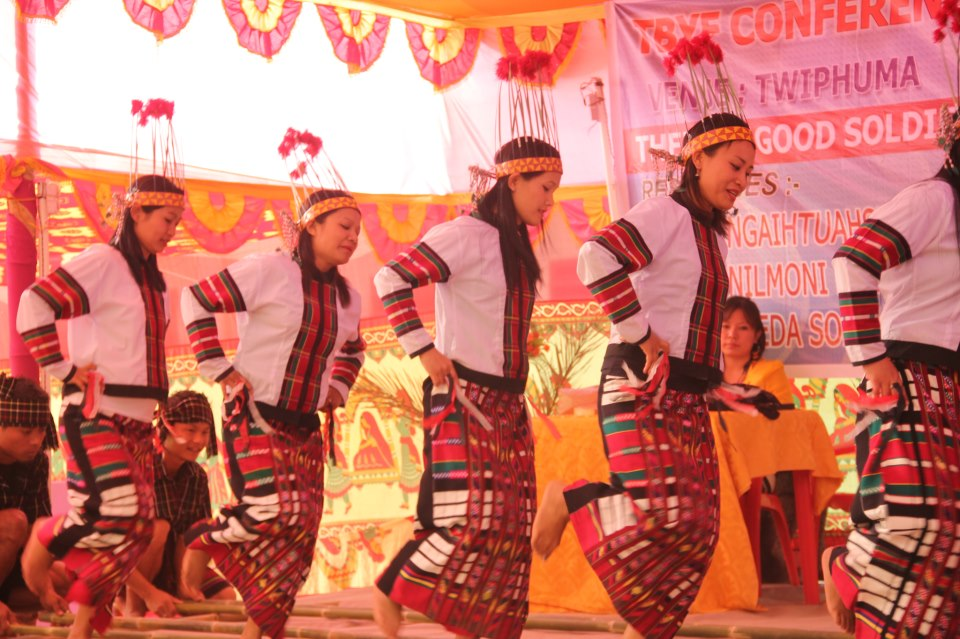
- Mizo girls performing the Cheraw dance
- Genre: Folk dance
- Year: 1st Century A.D
- Origin: Mizoram, India

Chapchar Kut Cheraw dance in Mizoram.

Cheraw dance is a traditional bamboo dance performed by the Mizo people of Mizoram, India, consisting of mostly six to eight people holding pairs of bamboo staves on another horizontally placed bamboo on the ground. The dance is considered one of the oldest known Mizo dances, with origins possibly dating to the 1st century AD, during the era before the Kuki-Mizo migration into the Chin Hills and later Mizoram.

Mizoram set a Guinness World Record in 2010, when over 10,736 dancers performed Cheraw in unison for eight minutes on a 3 km stretch in Aizawl.

== Dance ==
In the Cheraw dance, pairs of long bamboo poles are rhythmically tapped on the ground and struck together by participants, usually men, seated opposite each other. Female dancers move in synchronization with this rhythm, stepping in and out of the bamboo poles, crossing over them and performing controlled hops, slides and glides. As the dance progresses, both the speed of the bamboo tapping and the complexity of the dancer's footwork gradually increase. The dance requires careful coordination and timing.

The choreography of Cheraw incorporates movements inspired swaying of trees or the flight of birds. The bamboo poles generate the core rhythm, modern versions of the dance are sometimes accompanied by traditional Mizo instruments, including the khuang (drum) and darbu (gong), cymbals.

It is mainly showcased during community gatherings, weddings and national events.

== Modern ==
Later practice of Cheraw is accompanied by accordion, mandolin and guitar played in non traditional clothes.

== Dress code ==
The common costumes worn by the performers during the Cheraw dance include:

Women

- Vakiria - is a female headdress made of bamboo and decorated with feathers, beetle wings and other colorful objects. From the 1960s it evolved into the present form.
- Kawrchei - White red green black blouse.
- Puanchei - White red green black sarong.

Men

- Khumbeu - Bamboo hat
- Mizo Shawl

Costumes of Cheraw Dance typically come in vibrant colors.

== Gallery ==
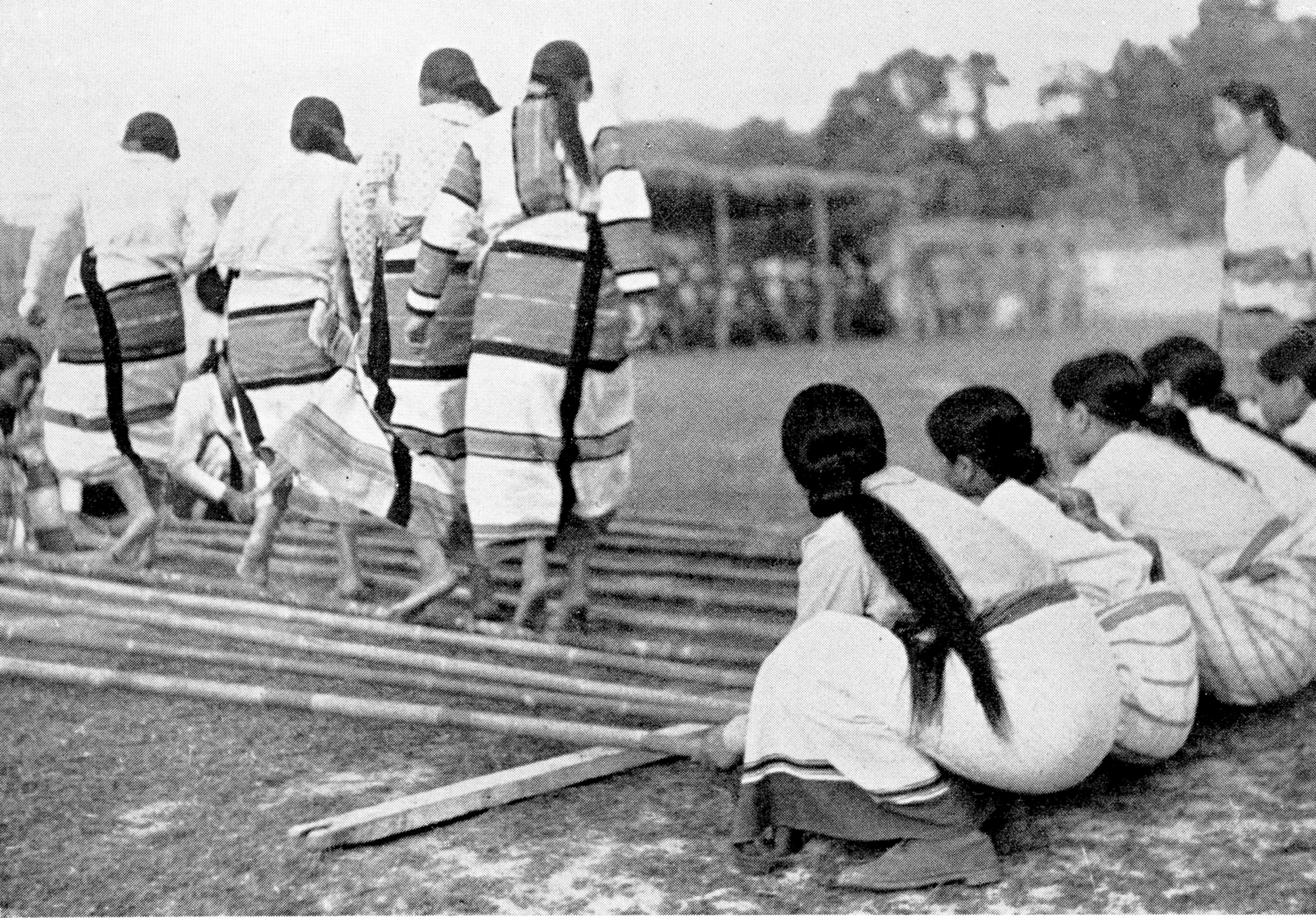
Cheraw dance in 1940s

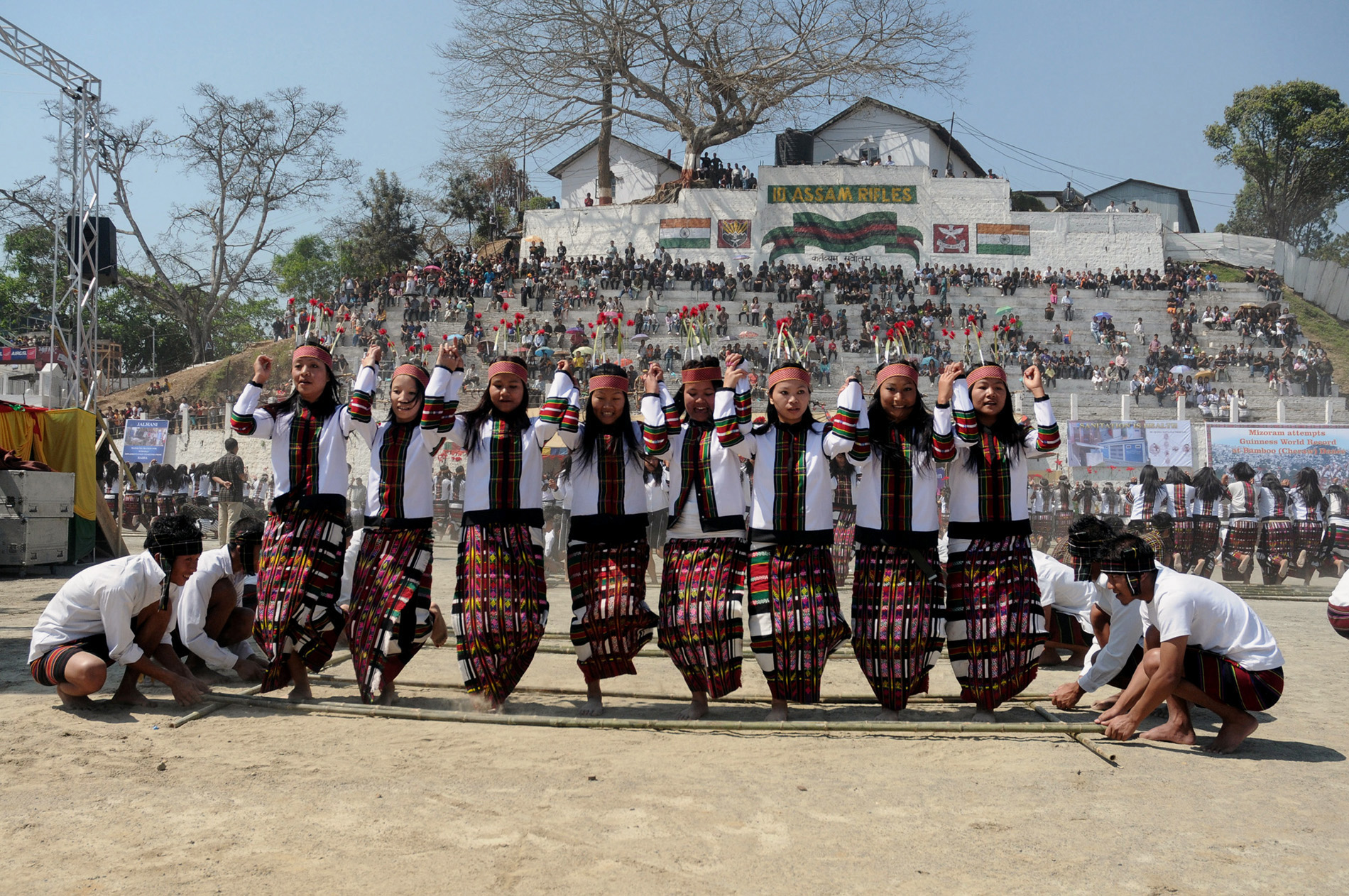
Artists perform Cheraw dance during the inauguration of the Chapchar Kut 2010 festival in Aizawl, Mizoram

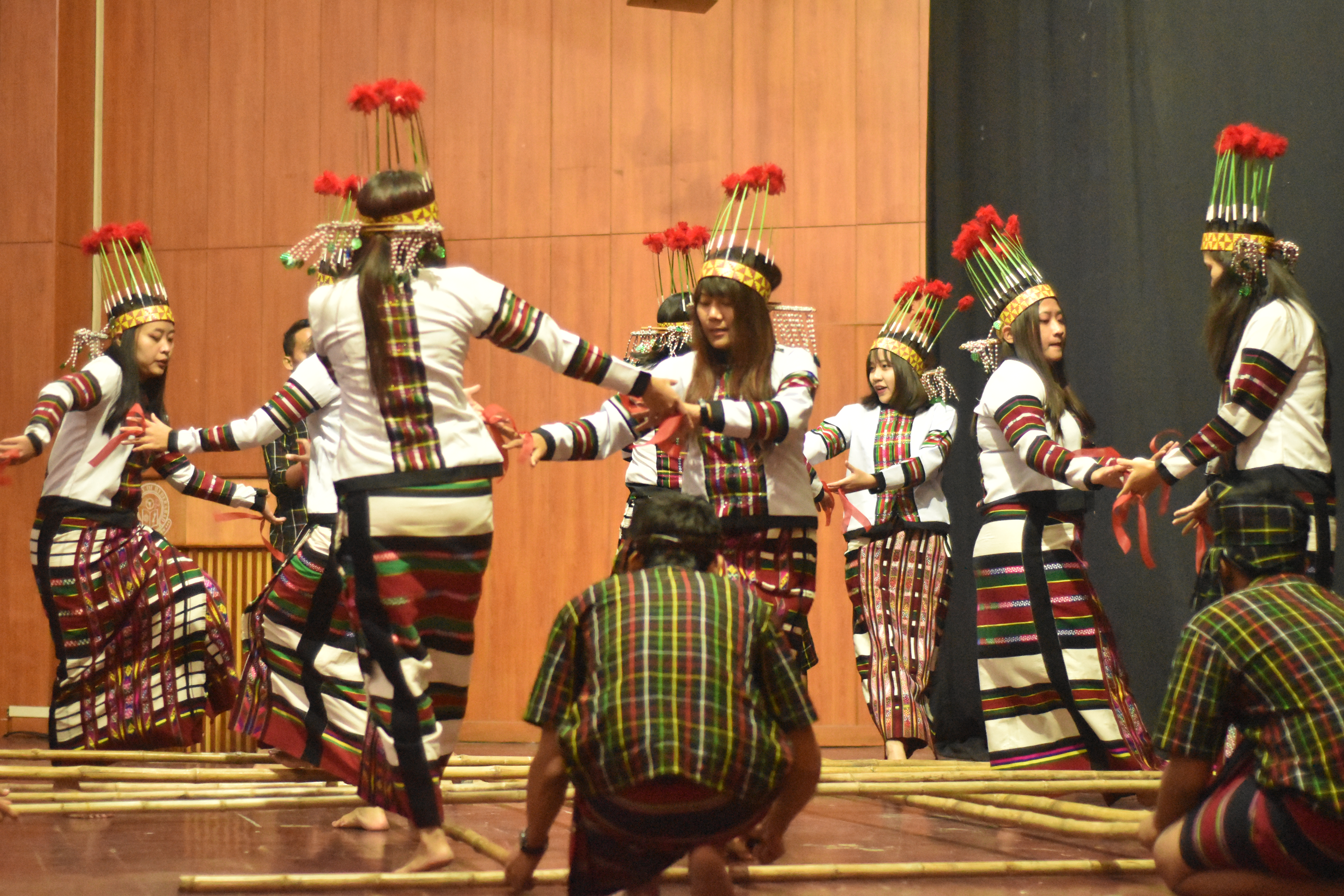

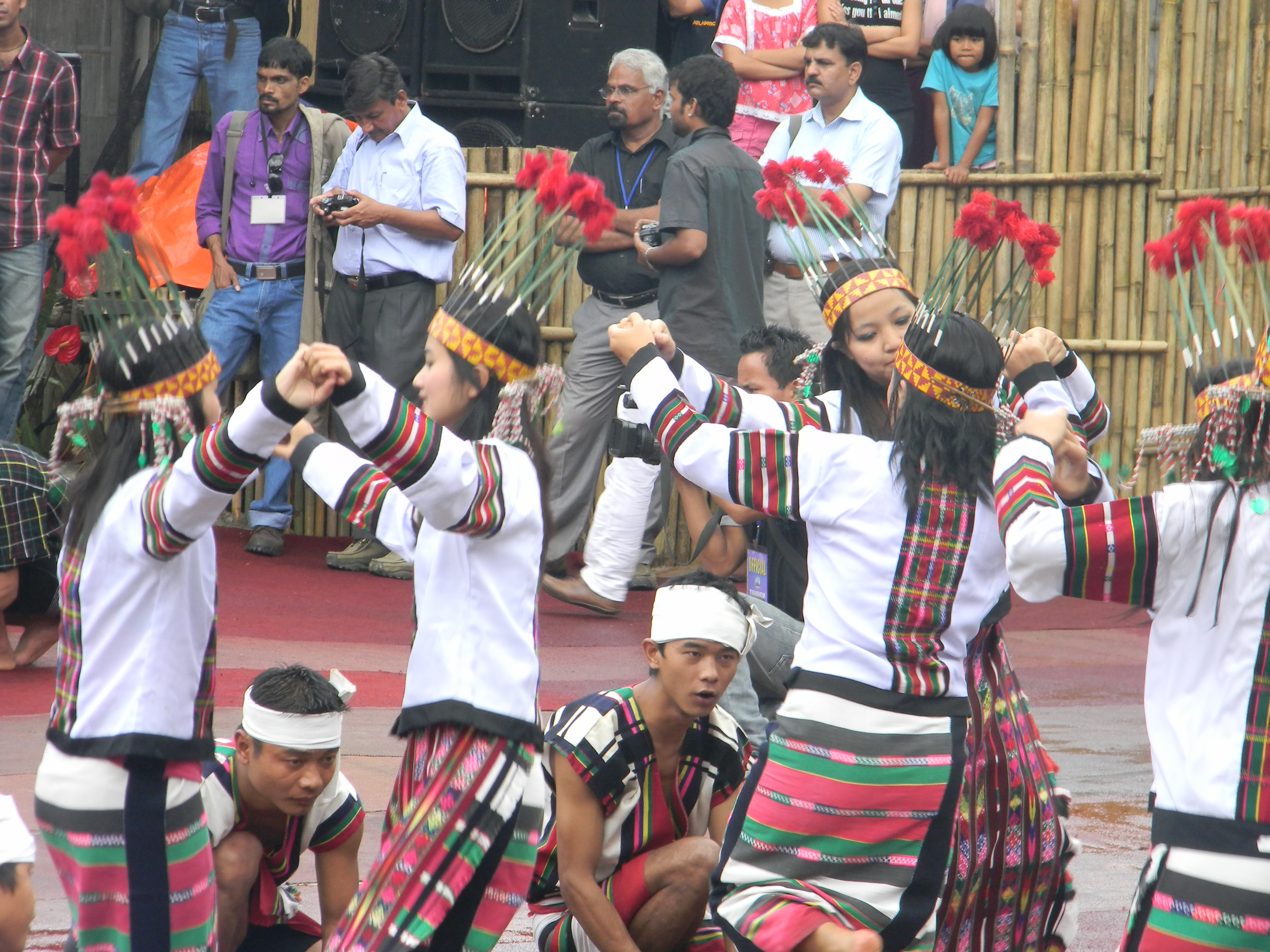

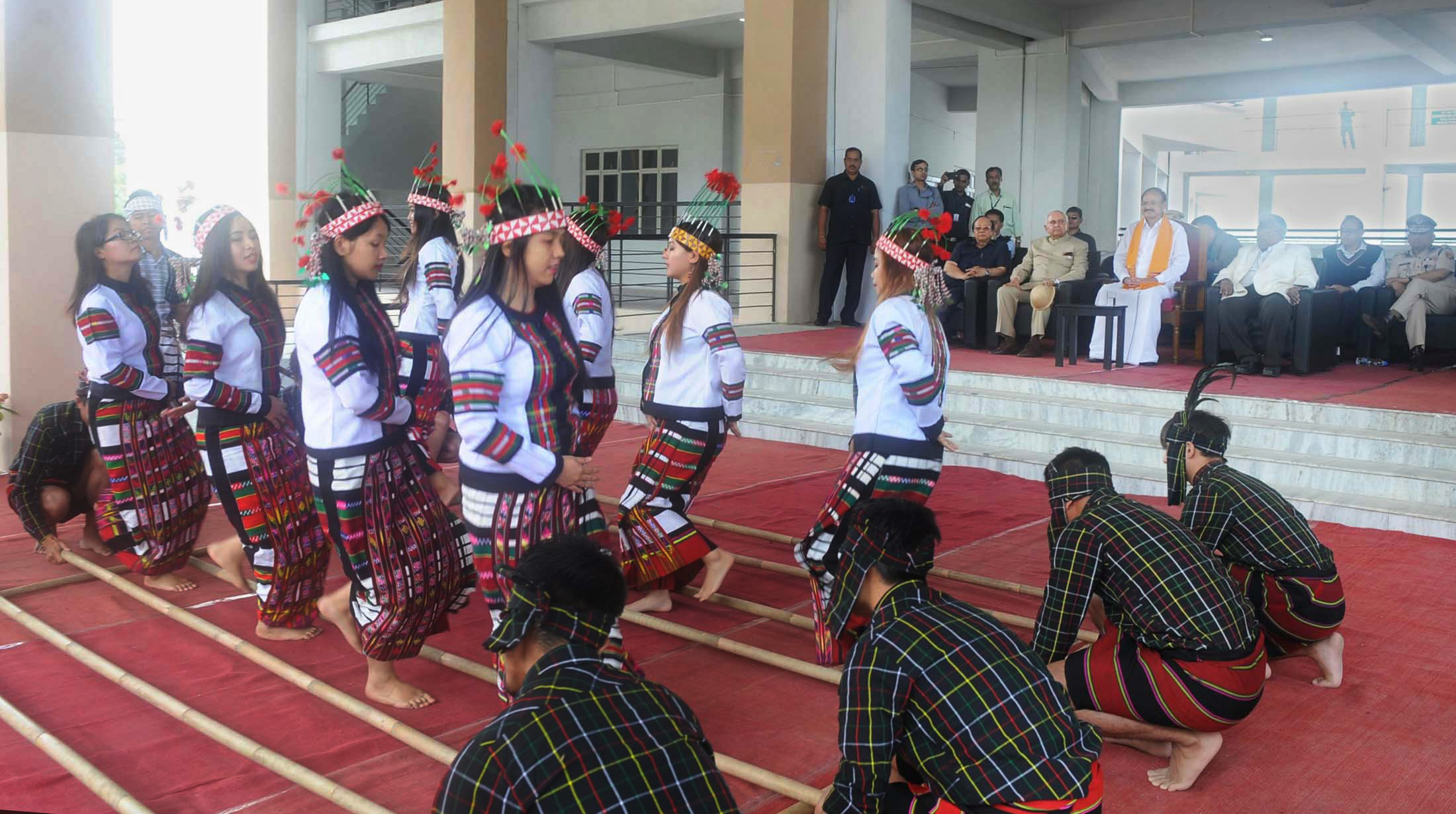
Cheraw dance performed by the Students of Mizoram University in Aizawl

== See also ==
- Bihu dance
- Manipuri dance
- Tinikling, similar dance from the Philippines
