= Chapchar Kut =

Mizo New Year festival

Chapchâr Kût Mizo New Year
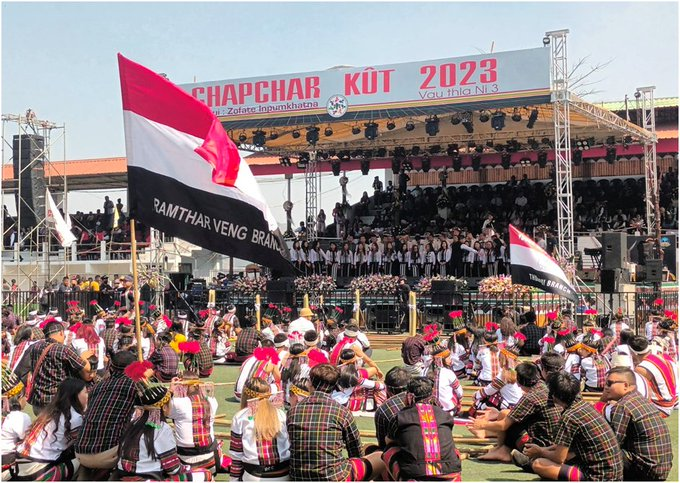
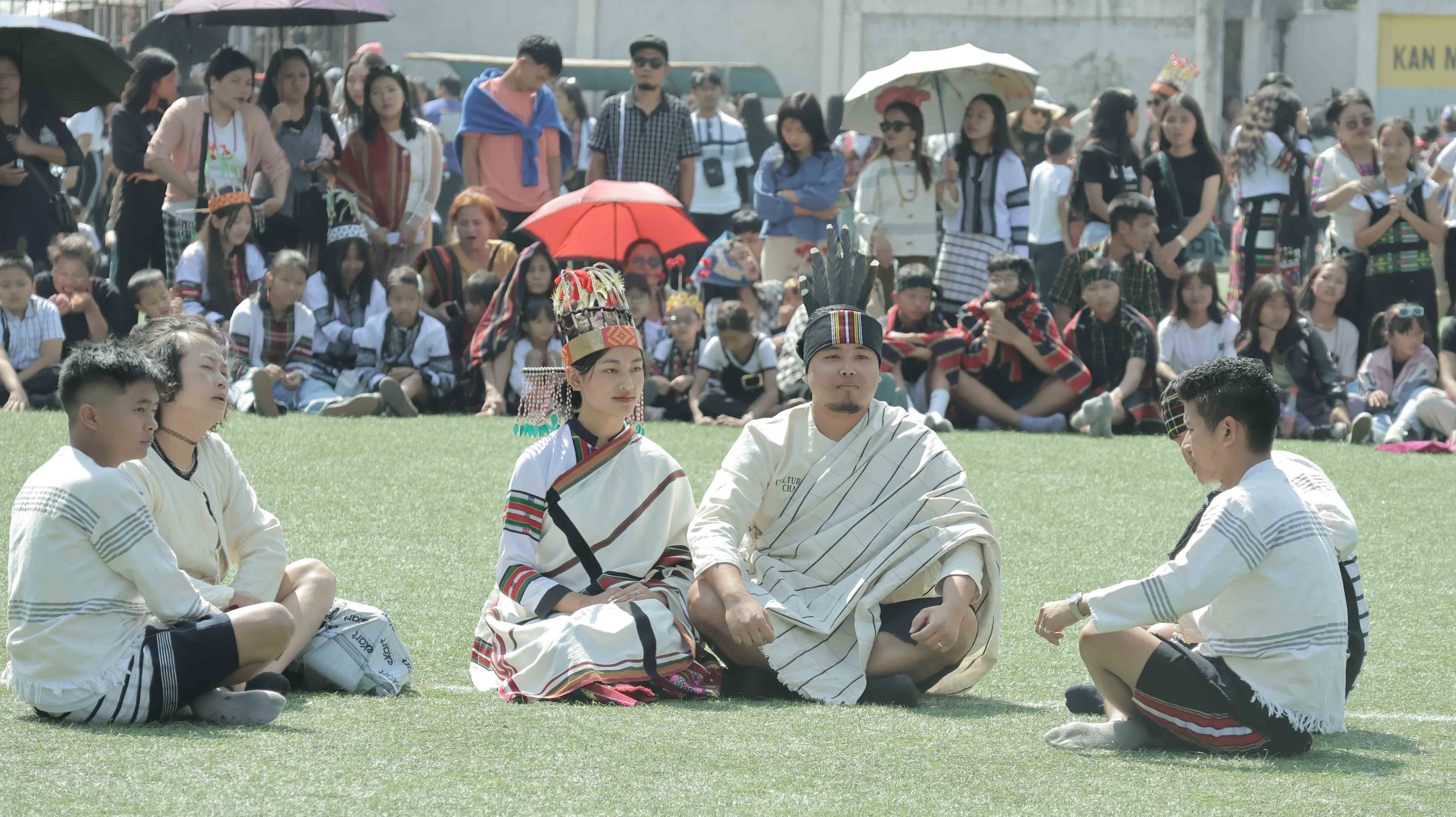
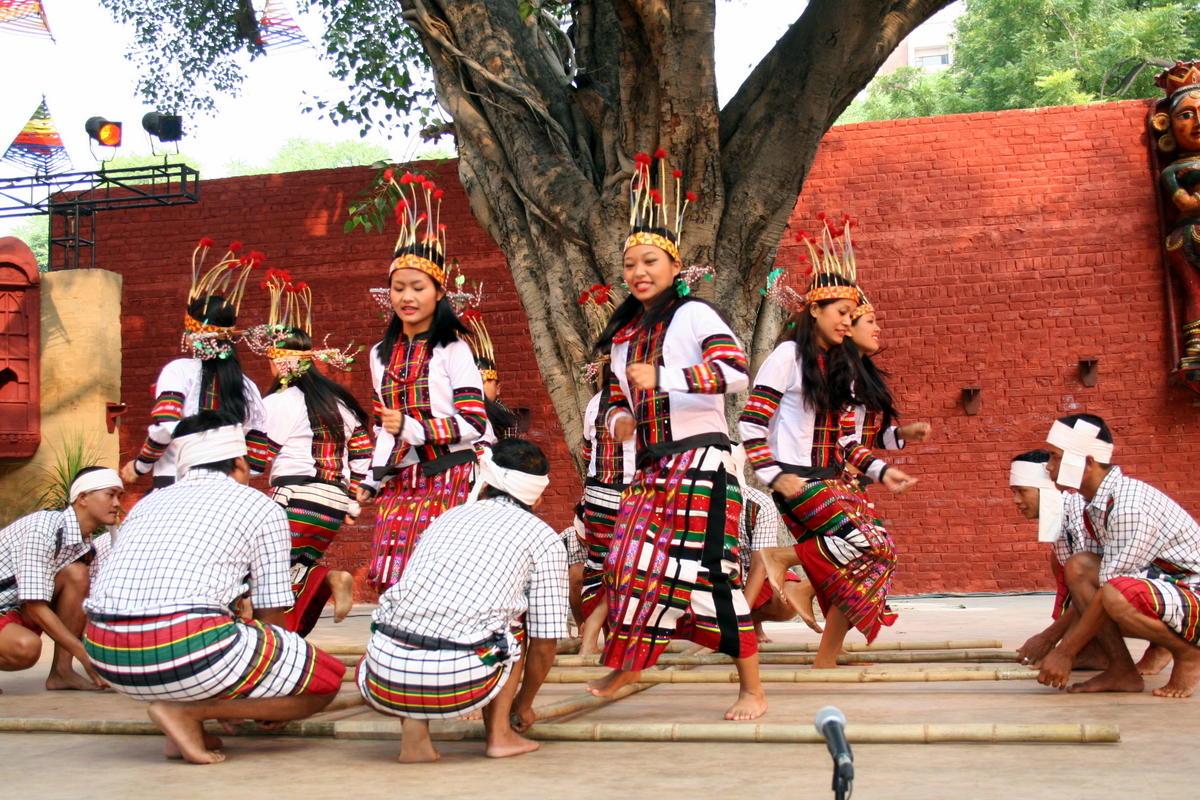
- Clockwise from the top: Chapchar Kut 2023 celebration in Aizawl, Chapchar Kut 2025 celebrations in Lunglei, Cheraw dance in New Delhi.
- Also called: Spring Festival, Mizo New Year
- Observed by: Mizo people all around the world
- Type: Cultural
- Significance: Marking the end of the Jhum cultivation month
- Date: First Friday of March
- Frequency: Annual

The Chapchar Kut (Lushai: Chapchâr Kût) is a festival of Mizoram, India. Chapchar Kut was originally celebrated to thank the gods for saving the people from harm during the clearing of forest on hill slopes for jhum cultivation at the beginning of a year.

== Origins and history ==
Chapchar Kut is estimated to have started in 1450–1700 A.D. in a village called Seipui. The festival apparently originated when the hunters came back to the village empty handed, to make up for the disappointment, the Village chief proposed an impromptu feast with rice beer and meat. Since then, every year the festival had been repeated by the village of Seipui and spread on to other villages. Chapchar Kut was first revived in 1962 on a grand scale in Aizawl, however it was discouraged when it was felt that it did not adhere to Christian values and rekindling the pre Christian cultural practices like drinking of rice beer, however, it was continued in 1973 on a mass scale sans animistic practice and cheraw dance. Even the Church which had been critical of the festival no longer objected to the festival as it felt that traditional culture was disappearing. Chapchar Kut is now held annually in the Month of March. People dance, perform skits, play musical instruments to celebrate their beloved festival with the aims of bringing camaraderie among the people.

== Celebration ==
Chapchar Kut cheraw dance, Mizoram, 2014

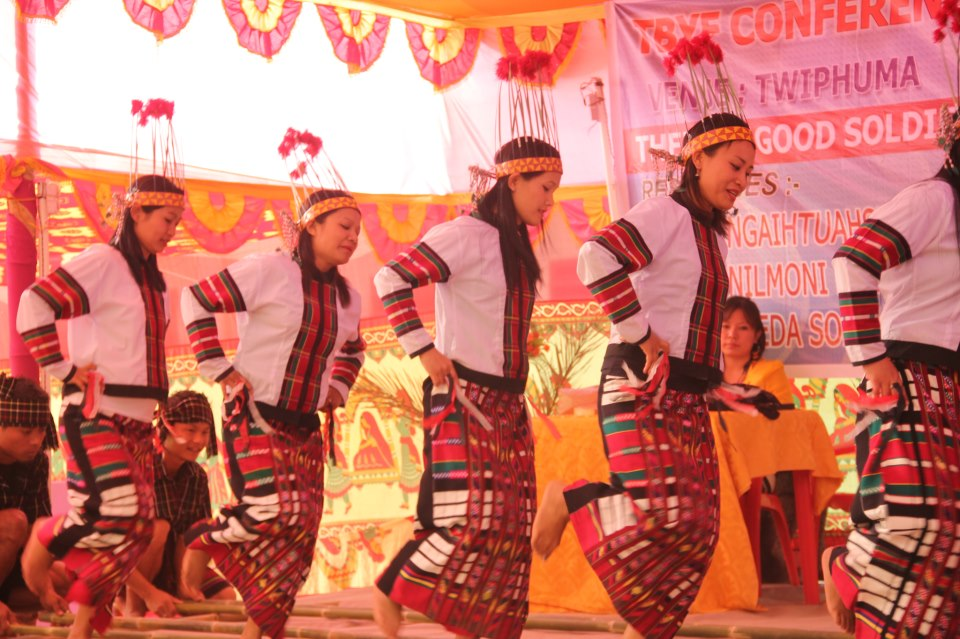
Cheraw dance is performed during Chapchar Kut

Oral traditions say Chapchar Kut was first celebrated in Seipui village in adjoining Myanmar that has a sizeable population of Mizos and their ethnic cousins. Chapchar Kut used to be celebrated to thank the gods for saving the people from harm during the clearing of forest on hill slopes for jhum cultivation at the beginning of a year. The festival used to be observed with a lot of drinking and eating. On the first night the young men and women would dance all night. The women would come dressed wearing a Vakiria. Chai dance has its origins in this festival. Today, the festival is observed in the last part of February or the early part of March when the trees and bamboos felled for jhum are left to dry and the shifting cultivators have time to relax and enjoy.

The Main activities which are done during the Chapchar Kut are:

- Chhawnghnawh – The Mizo custom of playfully stuffing a boiled eggs into each other's mouths.
- Dance – Cheraw dance is the Main dance but other dances performed during the festival are Khuallam, Chheihlam, Chai and Sarlamkai
- Music and Singing - Both traditional and Modern
- Arts, craft and Photo Exhibition.
- Chapchar Kut run.
- Mizo Traditional Games and costume parade.
- Wearing of Traditional dress at work places.
- Stalls with Etnnic cuisine.
