= Mizo culture =

Culture of the Mizo people of India

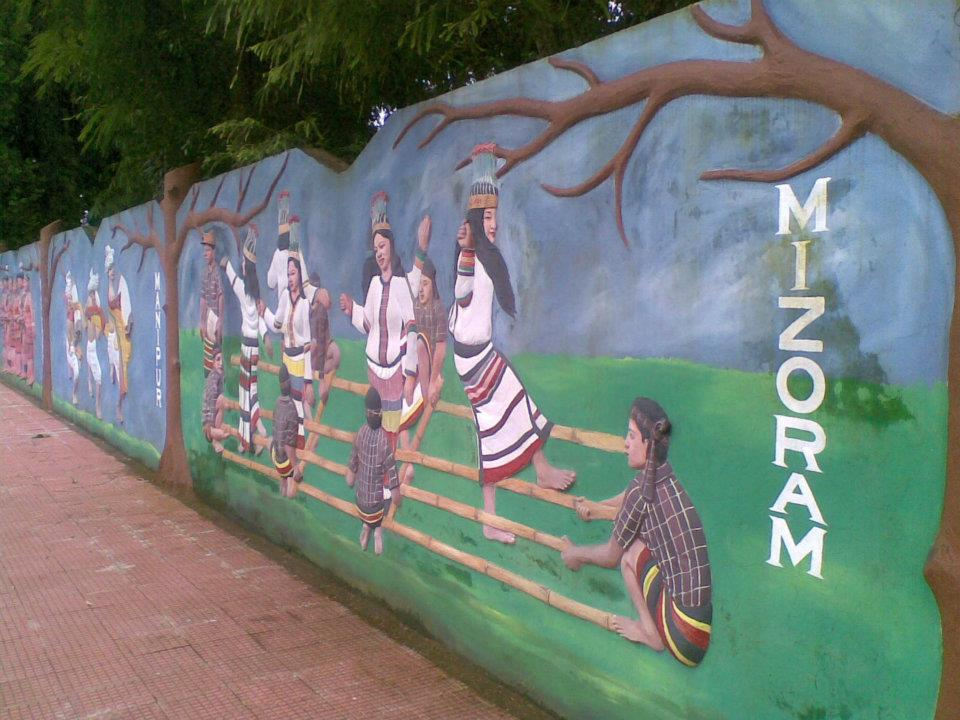
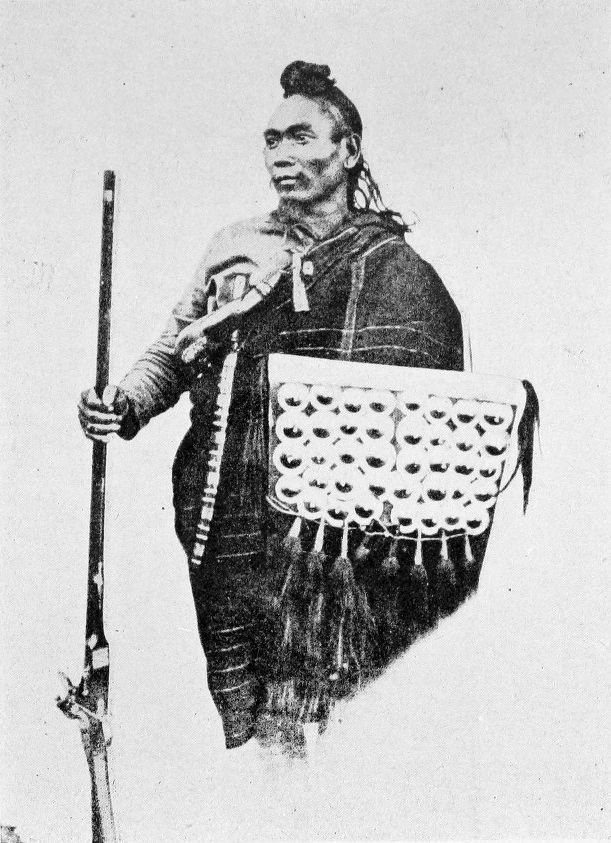
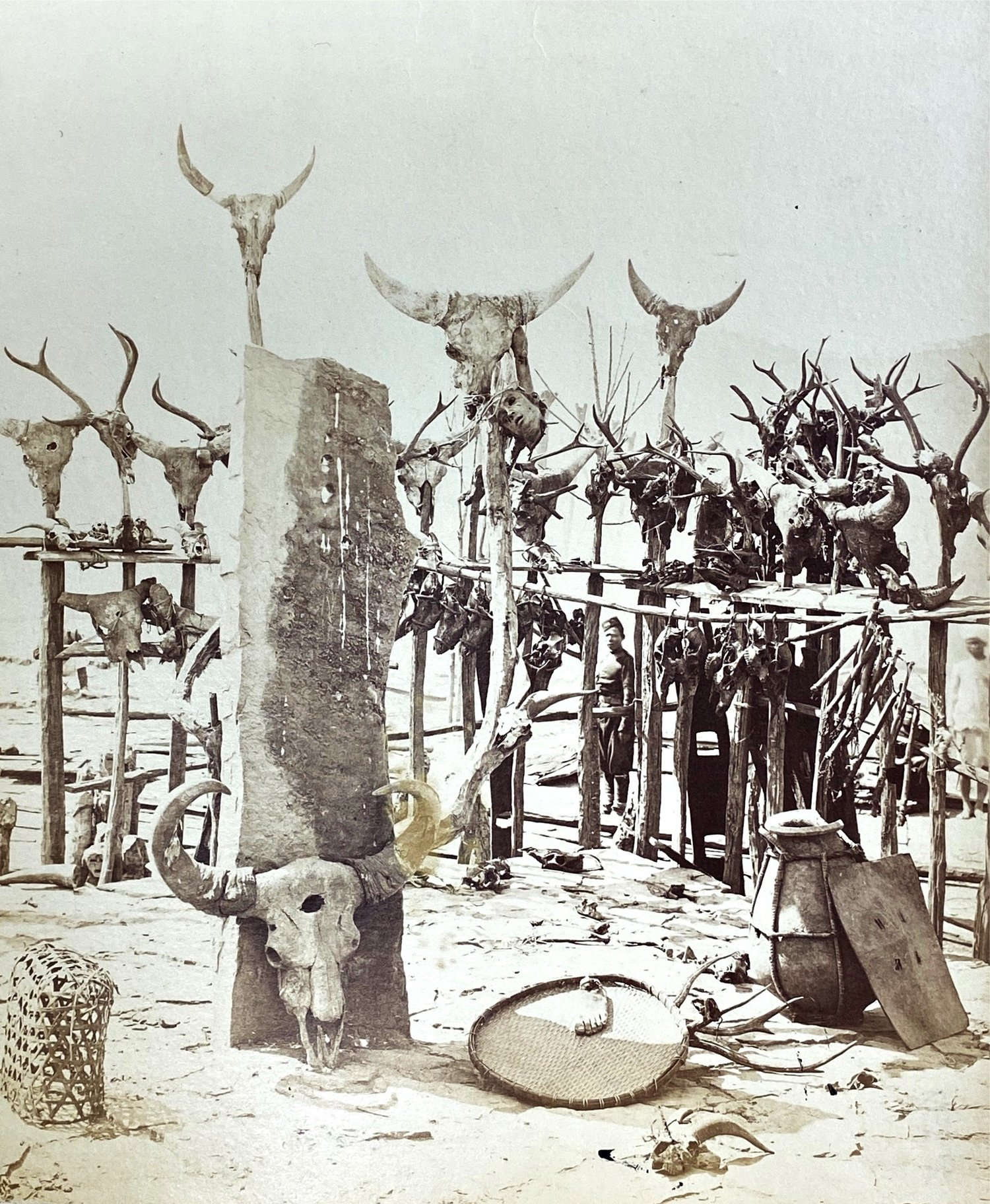
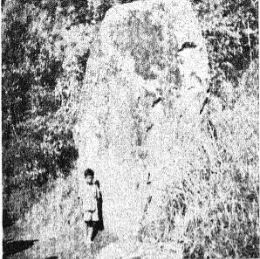
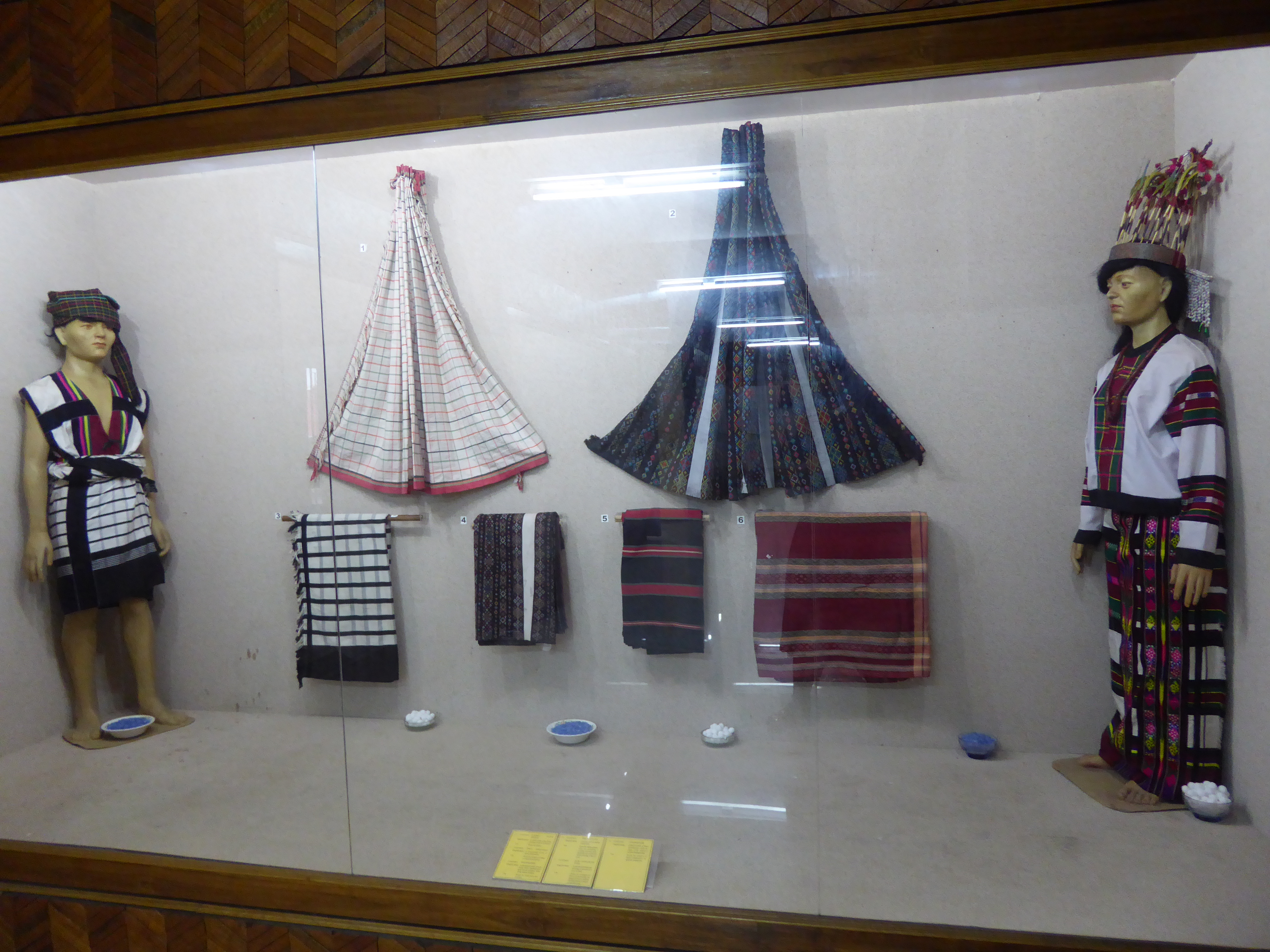
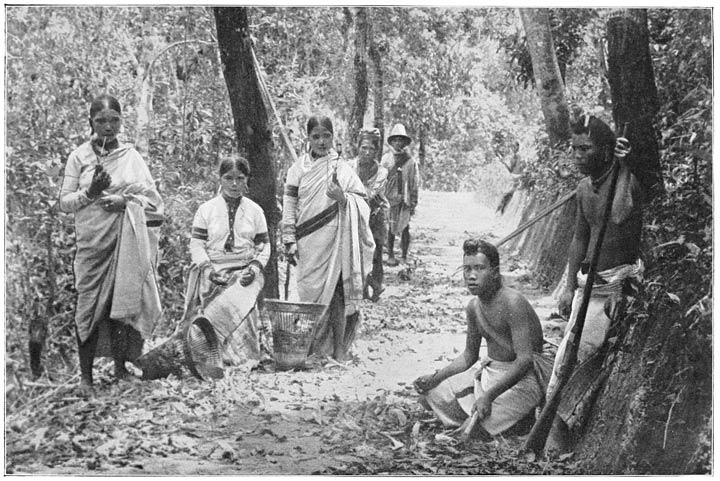
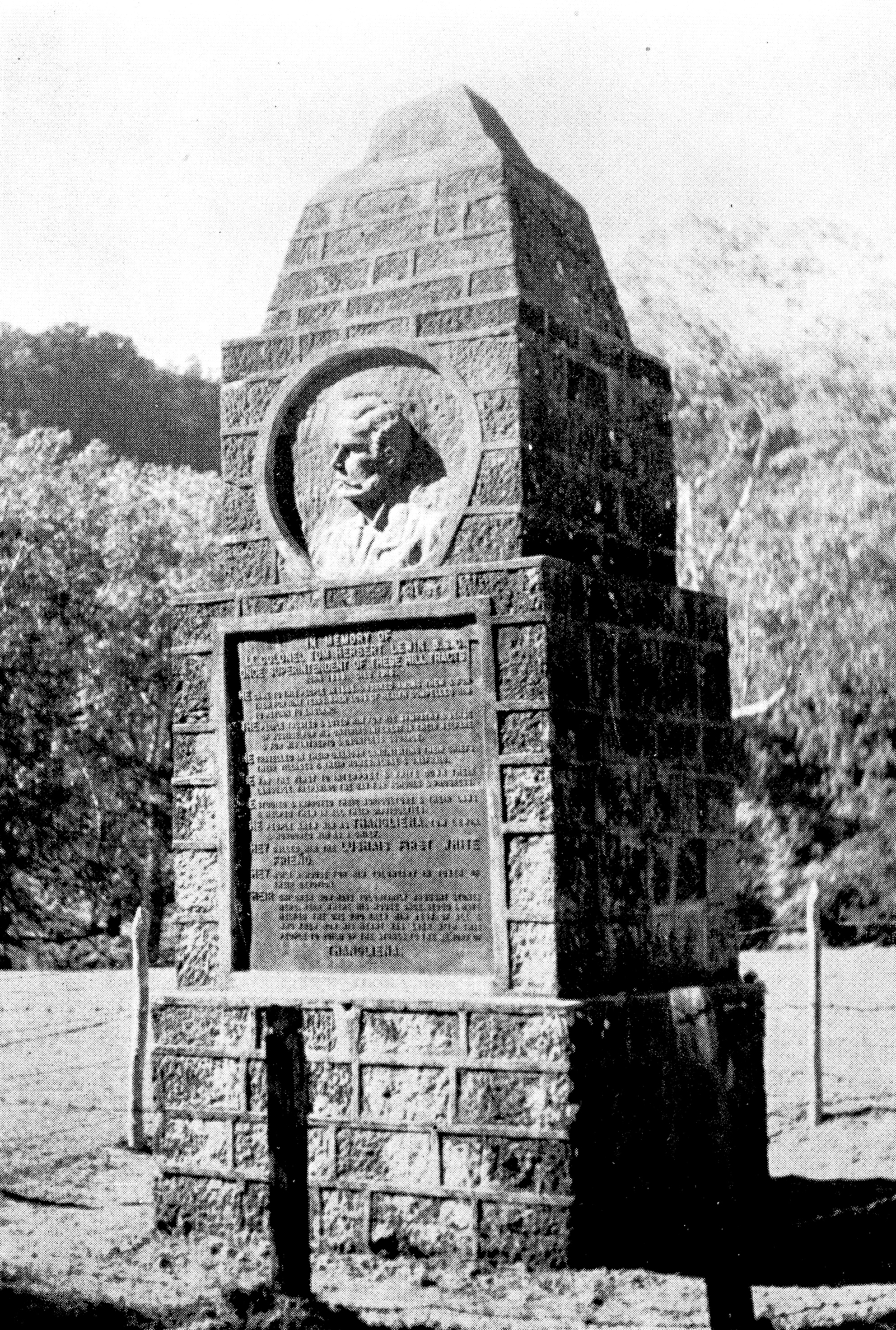
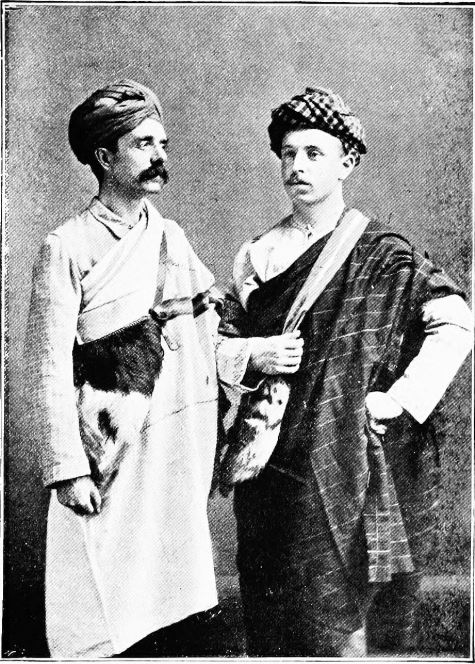
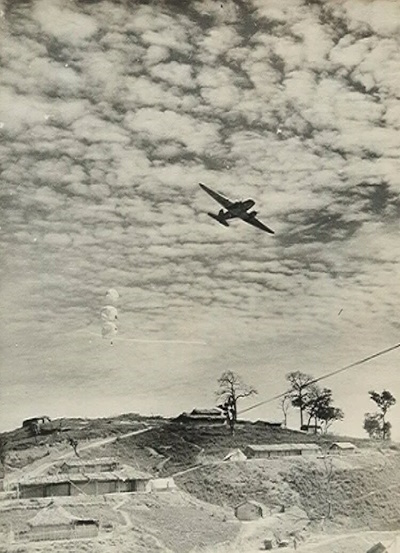
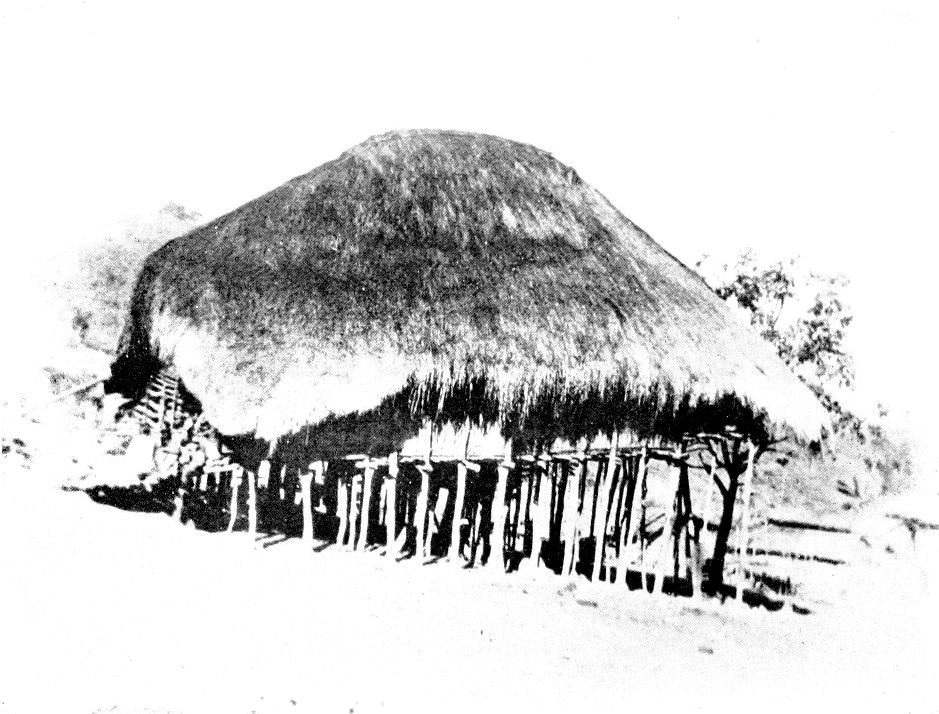
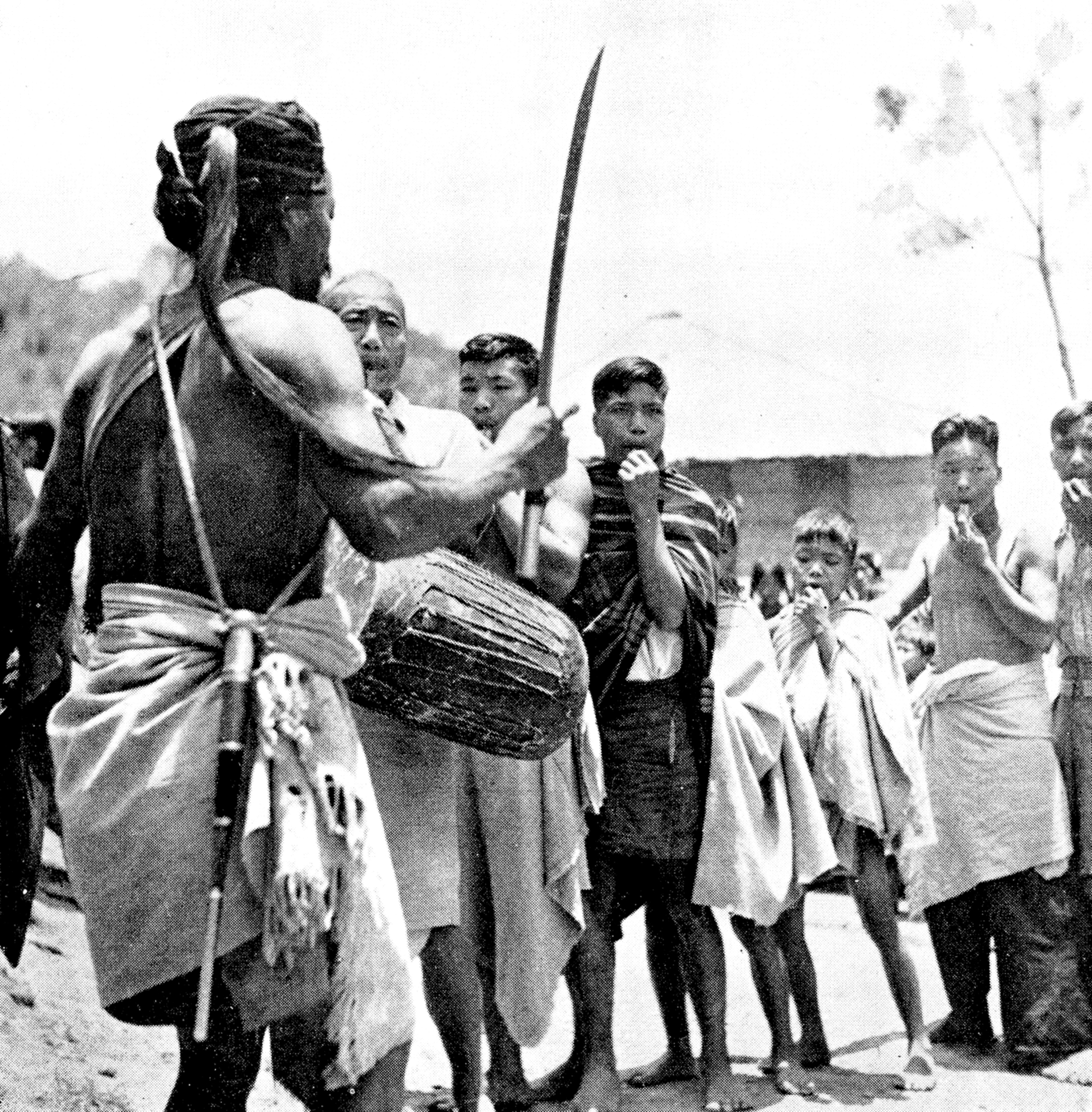
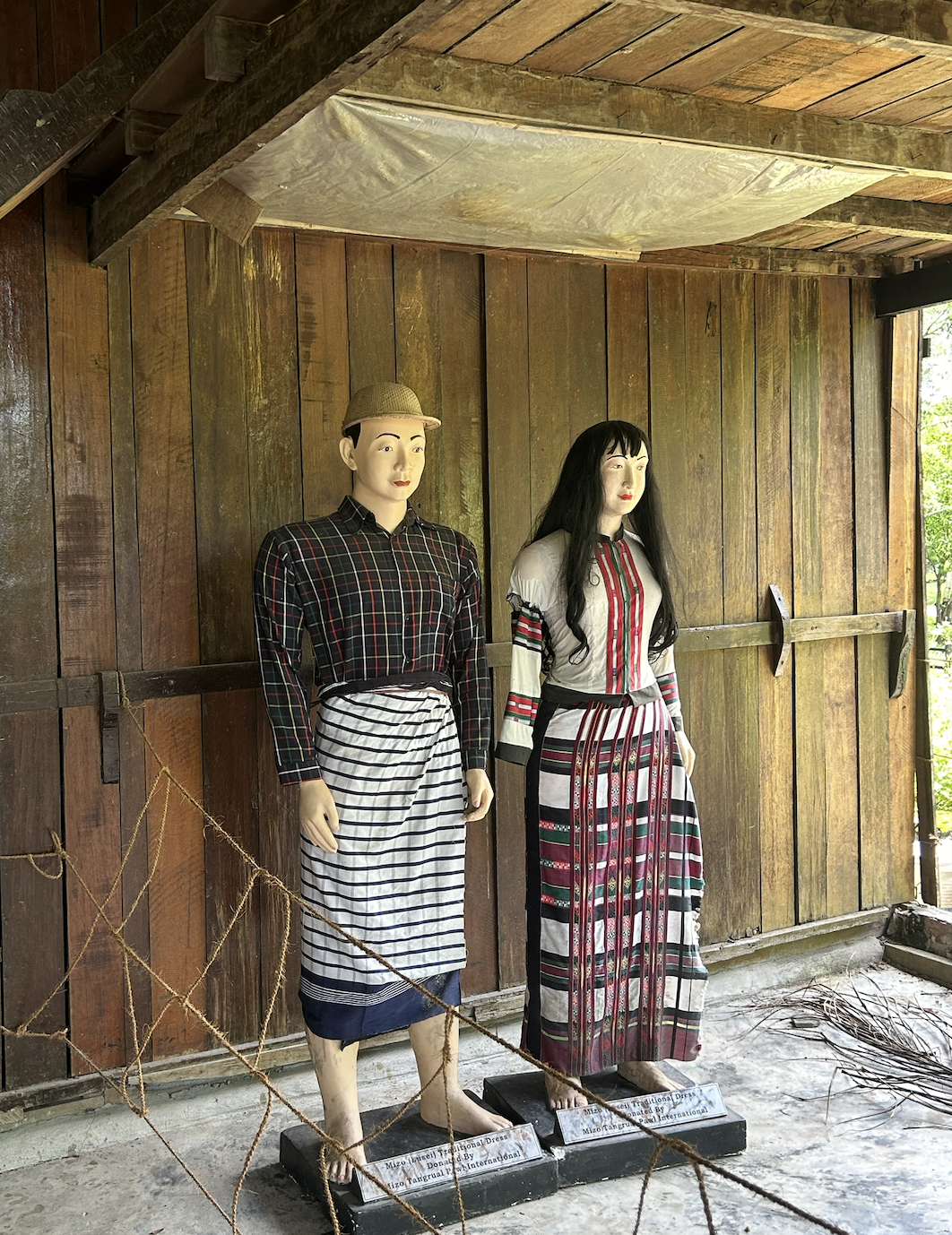
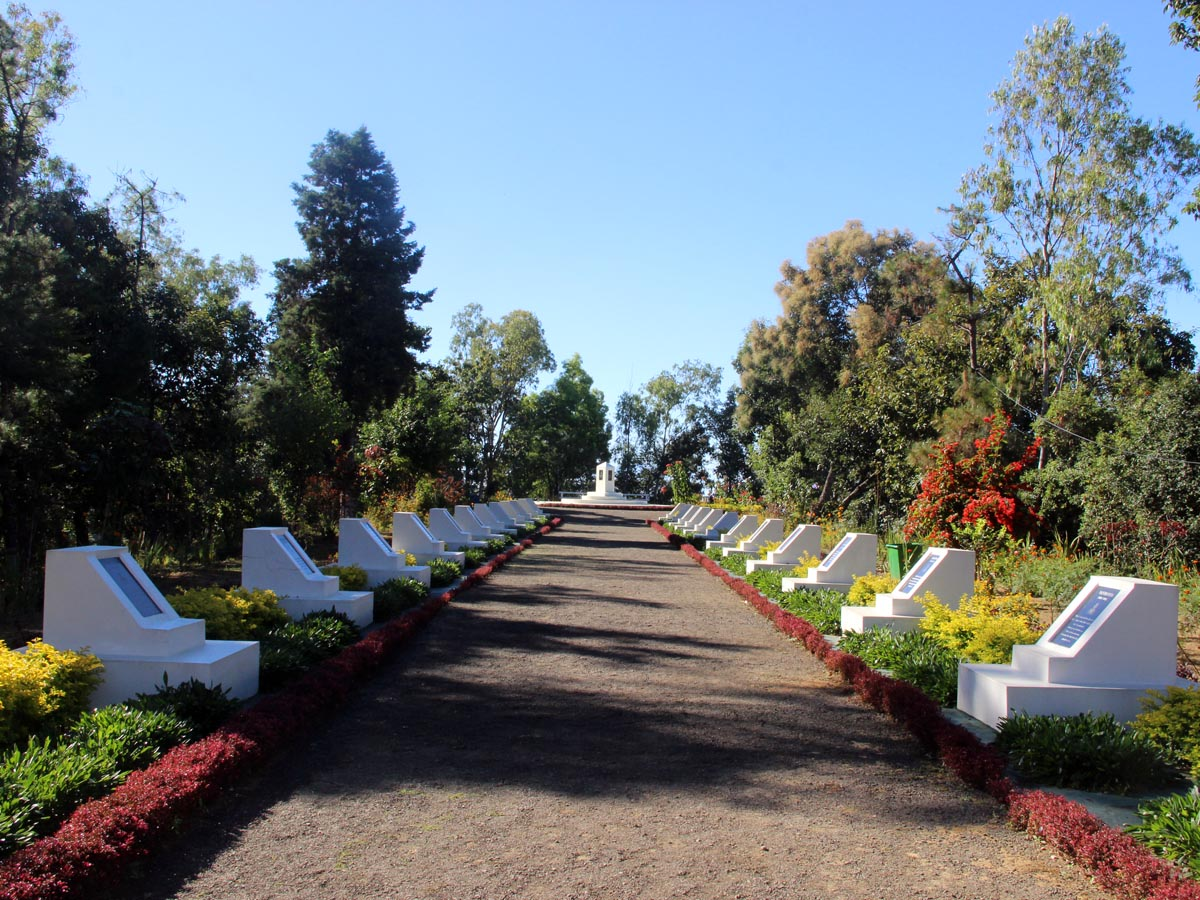
Representative elements of Mizo culture
Top：Cheraw dance mural, Chief Zakapa, Vanhnuailiana's tomb
Second left：Mangkhaia's Monument
Second center：Mizo clothing at the Mizoram State Museum
Second right：Mizo and Lai on the way to their jhum
Third left: Memorial of Thomas Herbert Lewin at Demagiri
Third center：First Chiristian missionaries (left: Frederick William Savidge, right: James Herbert Lorrain)
Third right:Bombing of Aizawl during Mizo National Front uprising
Bottom left：Zawlbûk (traditional bachelor dormitary)
Bottom middle left:Sa Aih ceremony for a killed tiger
Bottom middle right:Mizo clothing in Myanmar (Chin State)
Bottom right: Mizo Hlakungpui Mual (Mizo Poets Square)

The culture of the Mizo people has been heavily influenced by Christianity during the colonial era of the British Raj and the rise of Mizo nationalism with the Mizo Insurgency of 1966-1986. Mizo culture is rooted in the arts and ways of life of Mizos in India, Bangladesh and Myanmar. Mizo culture has developed in plurality with historical settlements and migrations starting from Southern China to the Shan states of Burma, the Kabaw valley and the state of Mizoram under the British and Indian administrations.

Despite significant westernization of Mizo culture due to Christianity and British influence, efforts have been made to revive pre-missionary traditions such as Chapchâr kût.

== Identity ==
The Mizo people (Lushai: Mizo hnam) are an ethnic group native to north-eastern India, western Burma (Myanmar) and eastern Bangladesh; this term covers several ethnic peoples who speak various Kuki-Chin languages. Though the term Mizo is often used to name an overall ethnicity, it is an umbrella term to denote the various tribes and clans, such as the Hmâr, Raltê, Lai, Lusei etc. A number of dialects are still spoken under the umbrella of Mizo;

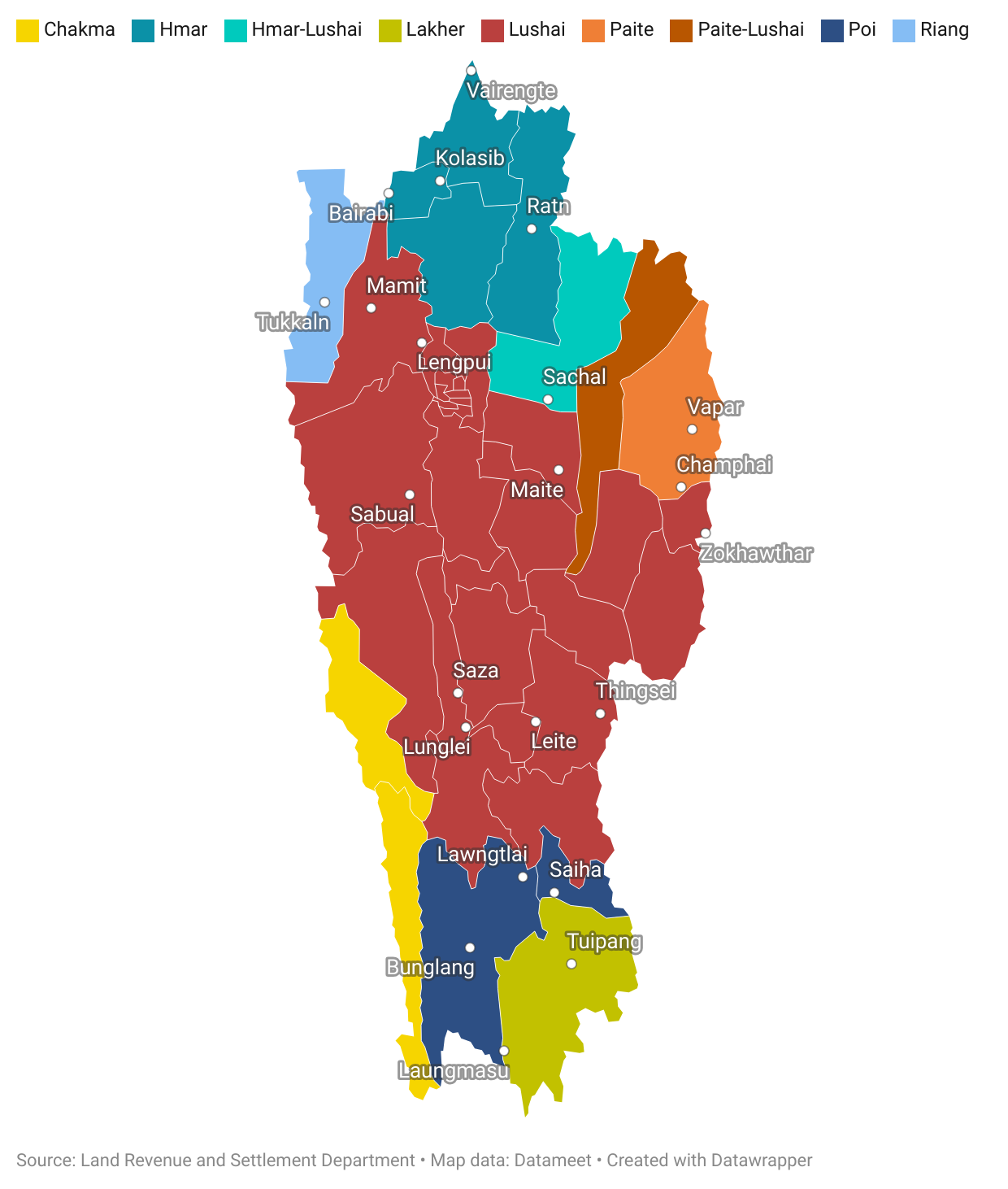
Historical settlements and distribution of Mizo Tribes and Clans in Mizoram State.

The Mizos are united in identity by shared customs and origins of tribes claiming origin from the origin of Chhînlung. Thus, Mizos are classified as Chhînlung chhuak (transl. Emerging from Chhînlung). The Mizos are both a nation and a tribe with various sub-classifications of groups within.

The history of these tribes is varied, with the largest one being the Lusei. The Lusei migrated and established dominance in the Northern Lushai hills between 1840 and 1850. The Paihtê are spread between Northern Mizoram and Southern Manipur, the difference is that the Paihtê in Central Mizoram have lost their original language as opposed to Churachandpur and North-East Mizoram. The Hmâr people settled historically in the northern cities of Biate, Champhai and Vangchhia. Like the Lushai, they were composed of royal sub-clans and chiefdoms. The Maras in the South-East are known as Lakher by the Mizo.

== Language ==
Mizo is the official language of Mizoram, along with English. Mizo language, or Duhlián ṭawng, is a language belonging to the Sino-Tibetan family of languages, spoken natively by the Mizo people in Mizoram states of India and Chin State in Burma.

Mizo ṭawng is a tonal language. It consists of four tones, a high tone, a low tone, a rising tone and a falling tone for a syllable to be expressed in four different meanings.

Restraints on vocabulary have also introduced many English words into the language. Words for objects, professions and other entities prefacing Mizo culture after the impact of Westernisation are borrowed from English directly. As English is also an official language of Mizoram, established with the onset of Christianity, it is widespread in Mizoram and easy to integrate.

== Religion ==
=== Animism ===
Before the advent of Christian missionaries, Mizo communities believed in the primaeval Mizo religion known as Lushai Animism.

The Mizo religion is structured with a Supreme God known as Pathian and his wife, the Goddess Khuanu. It is accompanied by many other beings, both benevolent and malevolent. Benevolent spirits include Khuavang, Pu Vana, Vanchungnula, Sakhua and Khaltu. Malevolent spirits would include Ramhuai, Hmuithla, Phung and Khawring.

=== Christianity ===
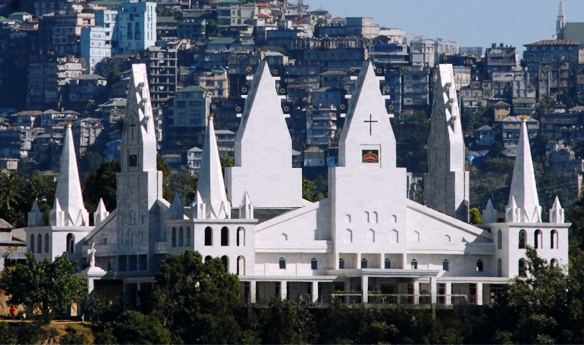
Solomon's Temple, Aizawl

Christianity was introduced via missionaries in 1984 via the Arthington Aborigines Mission. It marked the beginning of a cultural transformation in Mizoram through education and evangelisation. A Mizo alphabet was established in Roman script to allow the Mizo language to be written down. The missionaries also opened the first schools in Mizoram, which worked towards translating various gospels. The establishment of a Baptist Church under the Baptist Missionary Society of London expanded access to education and healthcare services.

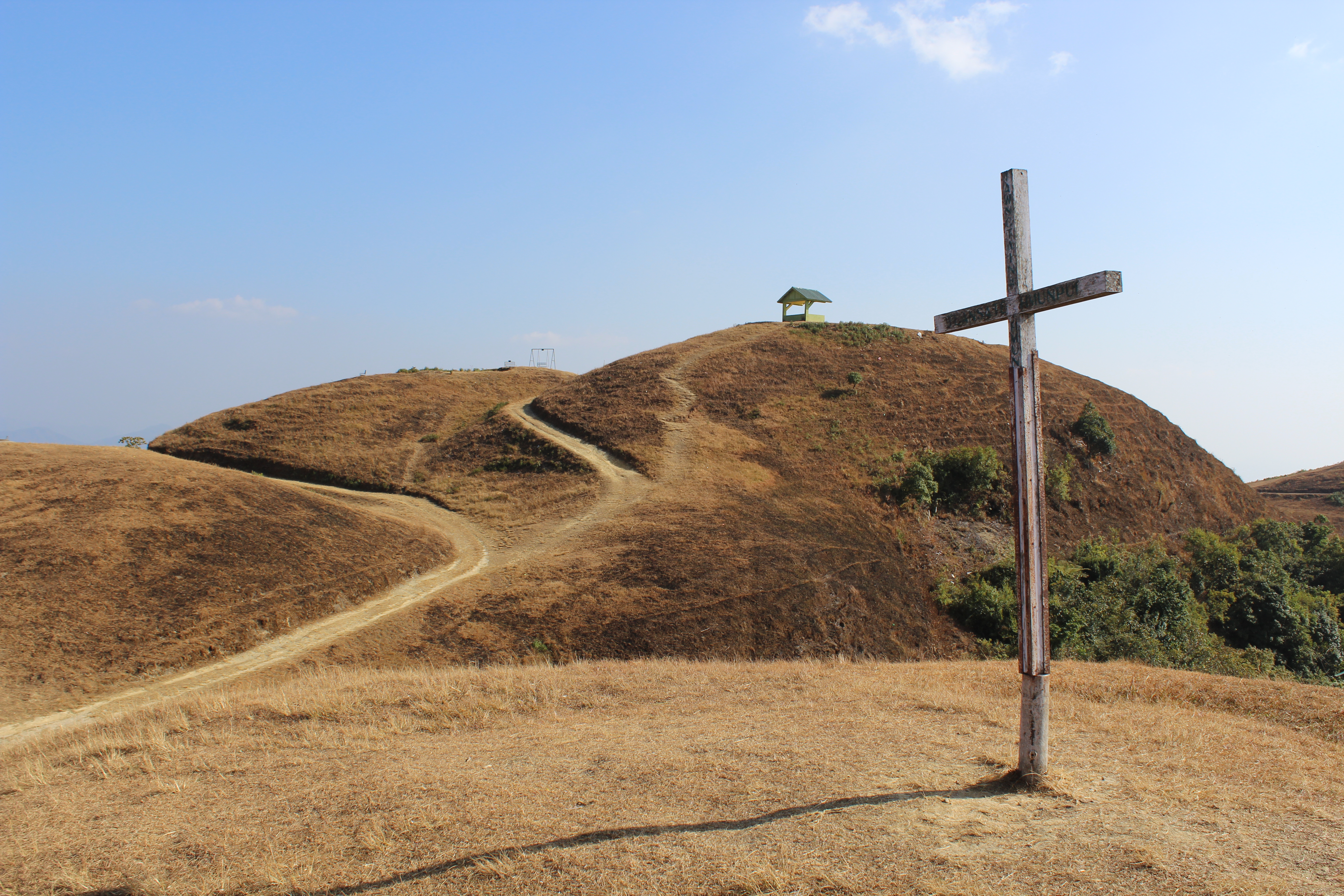
Hmunchung tlang, Sialsuk

One of the cultural symbols linked to Mizoram's Christian religion is the non-denominational Solomon's Temple which serves as a tourist attraction. The temple has been under construction for 20 years since the laying of its foundations in 1996 before inaugurating its opening in December 2017.

=== Bnei Menashe ===
The Bnei Menashe also known as Shinlung are a community of Indian Jews from the northeastern provinces. The movement was established in 1951 after a tribal leader had a dream of being one of the lost tribes of Israel and embracing the ideas of being Jews. Members of the Bnei Menashe mainly consist of Chin, Kuki and Mizo people. As a result of adopting Judaism, a significant number of approximately 5,000 of their 10,000 members have moved to Israel to continue their doctrine.

In 2005, the Shavei Israel organisation and the local council of Kiryat Arba supported the Bnei Menashe to open its first community centre in Israel. Several synagogues have been subsequently built in Mizoram, Manipur and other areas, including a mikveh (ritual bath) in Mizoram and Manipur with the guidance of Israeli rabbis.

== Folklore ==
Mizo folklore and mythology are varied and diverse across the several clans and tribes in the state. It ranges from stories of natural wonders and landscapes to individuals revered through oral legend. Several places in Mizoram often have a mythological story, including Kungawrhi puk, Sibuta Lung, Phulpui Grave and Chhingpui Memorial.

=== Creation myth ===
The origin myth of the Mizo people describes the creation of the natural world by the Goddess Khuazingnu. The story recounts how a representative couple of each human community and animal species were placed inside a cave sealed with the rock known as Chhînlung. The rock was lifted and the entrance was unsealed by Goddess Khuazingnu to repopulate the Earth. All the clans, tribes and different people exited this way until the Raltê clan exited with great noise. Due to this noise, the Chhînglung rock was placed back and sealed. This also led to the coining of Raltê bengchheng meaning noisy/rowdy Ralte.

=== Chhurbura ===
Chhurbura is a Mizo folklore character who is a culture hero. There are several stories of his exploits encompassing foolishness and wisdom.

== Literature ==
Mizo literature is the literature written in Mizo ṭawng, the principal language of the Mizo peoples, which has both written and oral traditions. It has undergone a considerable change in the 20th century. The language developed mainly from the Lusei dialect, with significant influence from Pawi language, Paihtê language and Hmâr language, especially at the literary level.

A genre unique to Mizo history and culture is that of Rambuai (transl. troubled land). This is a reference to all poetry, songs and literature associated with the Mizo Insurgency 1966-1986. Rambuai literature normally deals with the social and cultural traumas associated with the era such as sexual violence, air attacks, village groupings and curfews.

=== Mizo Hlakungpui Mual ===
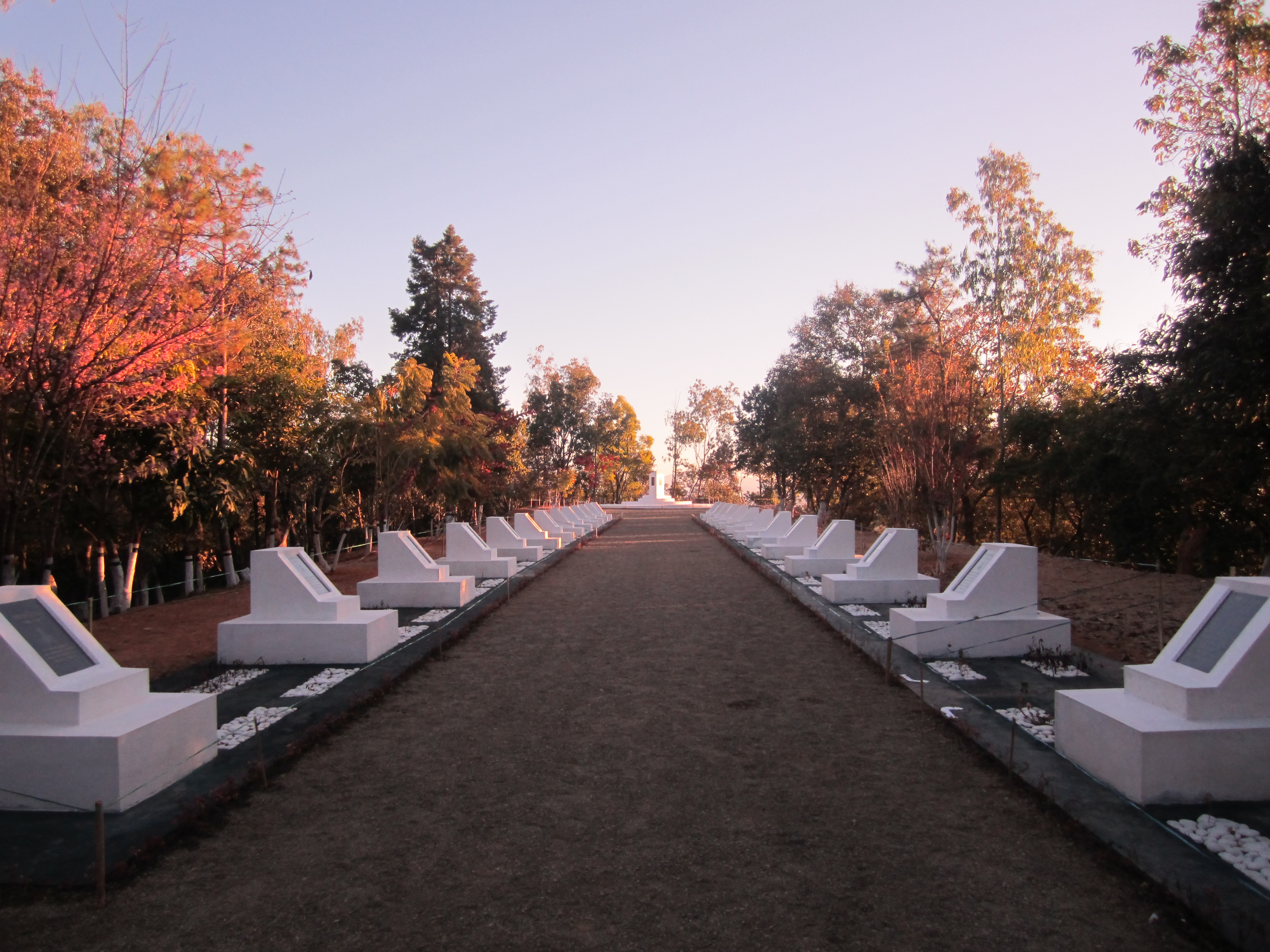
Mizo Hlakungpui Mual in Mizoram

To honour the contributions of Mizo poets and writers, the Mizo Hlakungpui Mual (transl. Mizo Poets square) was established in 1986. The Committee nominates memorials for poets with exceptional contributions to Mizo culture and writers with 3-4 books with prolonged influence on Mizo culture. Four phases of monuments have been erected, totalling 36 notable literature individuals memorialized.

== Cinema ==
The history of Mizo cinema begins with the arrival of Christianity with stills and movie cameras from the missionaries. One of the first cinematic events in Mizoram was the silent film on Mizoram, "Land of the Lushai's", possibly between 1940 and 1950.

Access to both Western and Hindi movies increased in the 1950s. Silent movies were introduced through movie halls such as 'Krishna Talkies' built-in Aizawl. Throughout the 70s, cinema halls further popularized Western movies and martial arts movies. Cinema culture, however, declined due to the low maintenance of cinema halls and the popularization of television.

In 1983, the "Young Stars Films Company" was established by film enthusiasts in Aizawl. The company produced the first full-featured Mizo film Phuba (transl. Revenge) in 8mm film. The movie was based on a novel of the same title published previously by the producer. Between 1983 and 1990, more low-budget films were produced under different Mizo filmmakers with both 8mm film and the newly introduced video camera. Due to a lack of skilled personnel locally in Mizoram, movie productions in the 90s declined with the inability to handle post-production and afford video cameras at high prices. The establishment of the Aizawl Films and Drama Cooperative Society saw a slight increase in film production from 1993 onwards.

Mizo movies began to experience a revival with the introduction of CD and DVD formats. Between 1999 and 2004, Mizo movies were in high demand, with approximately 50-70 Mizo films produced annually. The movie industry outside of Aizawl also began to grow in towns such as Champhai, Saiha and Khawzawl. Filmmakers such as Mapuia Changthu of Leitlang Pictures and Napoleon RZ Thanga began to produce high-quality films and formulate filmmaking as a profession in Mizoram. In 2008, the Government of Mizoram began to support the filmmaking industry of Mizoram.

== Visual arts ==
The first Mizo art organization was the Mizoram Painters Association on 13 August 1971. Painters would originally use their skills for commercial purposes such as signboards and memorial stones as opposed to fine art. On 30 May 1987 the Mizoram Painters Association was changed into the Mizoram Artists Society. The first art exhibition was held February 1888 organized by the Arts and Culture department of Mizoram. At the exhibition 70% of the art pieces consisted of enamel and poster colours. On 5 September 1992 the Mizoram Academy of Fine Arts was founded to promote fine arts and painting. Oil painting among Mizo artists became popular after 1986.

The development of Fine Arts in Mizoram has historically been stifled with low tourism and interest in local art. Six art exhibitions have been held in 1988 Aizawl, 1989 Lunglei, 1990 Aizawl, 1990 in the Northeast Zone Culture festive., 1992 New Delhi and 1995 in Aizawl. The Northeast Zone Culture centre organized art workshops in Mizoram seven times with painters from neighbouring northeastern states.

== Traditional music ==
Mizo music consists of three periods, namely Pipute Hla of pre-missionary era music, Sakhaw thar hla music developed within the missionary era, and Tunlai hlate of the contemporary era.

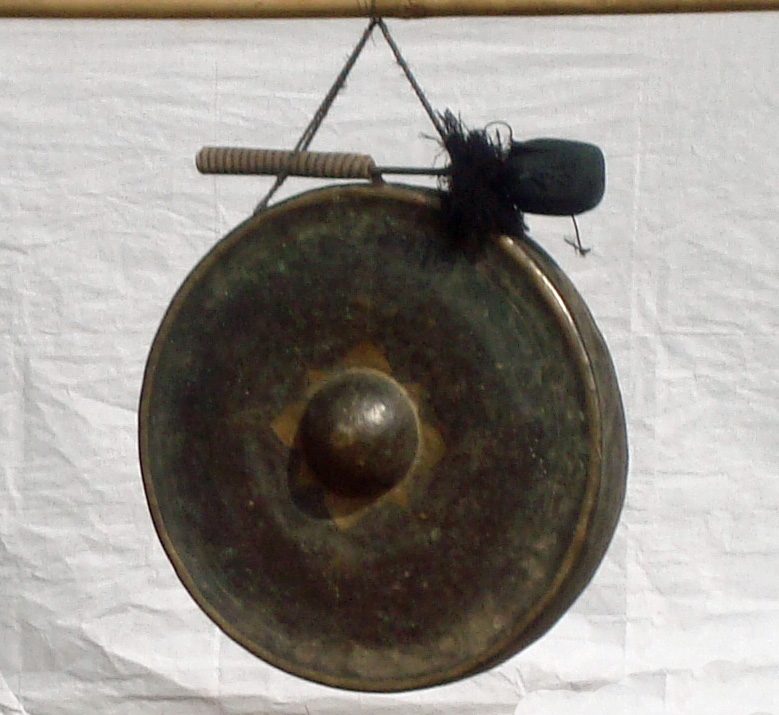
Darkhuang, Zamluang or jamluang – a traditional musical instrument found in Mizoram.Other instruments include khuang (drum), dar (cymbals), as well as bamboo-based phenglawng, tuium and tawtawrawt.

Mizo folk music consists of vocals (singing) accompanied by traditional drums, gong and other native percussion instruments. Traditional Mizo songs are classified for different purposes. Dar hla were songs accompanied by the Dar (traditional Mizo gong). These songs tended to use simple lyrics to accompany the gongs. Hlado were songs associated with warriors to hunt and celebrate victory upon returning to their villages. Similarly, Bawh Hla is sung by warriors upon successful war or raids that lead to the headhunting of enemies. Thiam Hla were religious songs taught in private to priests through oral teaching. They would be used for medicinal purposes, animal sacrifices or rituals involving the spirit world.

Mizo music began to diverge from its traditional ways with the introduction of Christianity and the changes to Mizo culture. The folk music environment transitioned into hymns, gospels and choir instead. Many Mizo songs became direct translations of British English hymns incorporating worship. Parallel to the impact of Christianity on Mizo music, it also led to a new genre known as Hnam hla. This genre focussed on songs and music based around nationalism. It was significant from the early 20th century to the creation of the Mizo Union and the Mizo Insurgency of 1966-1986. Notable composers of Hnam hla are known as Rokunga and include Laltanpuia, Kaphleia and Captain L.Z. Sailo, whose songs rally for solidarity and connection to the land.

== Traditional clothing ==
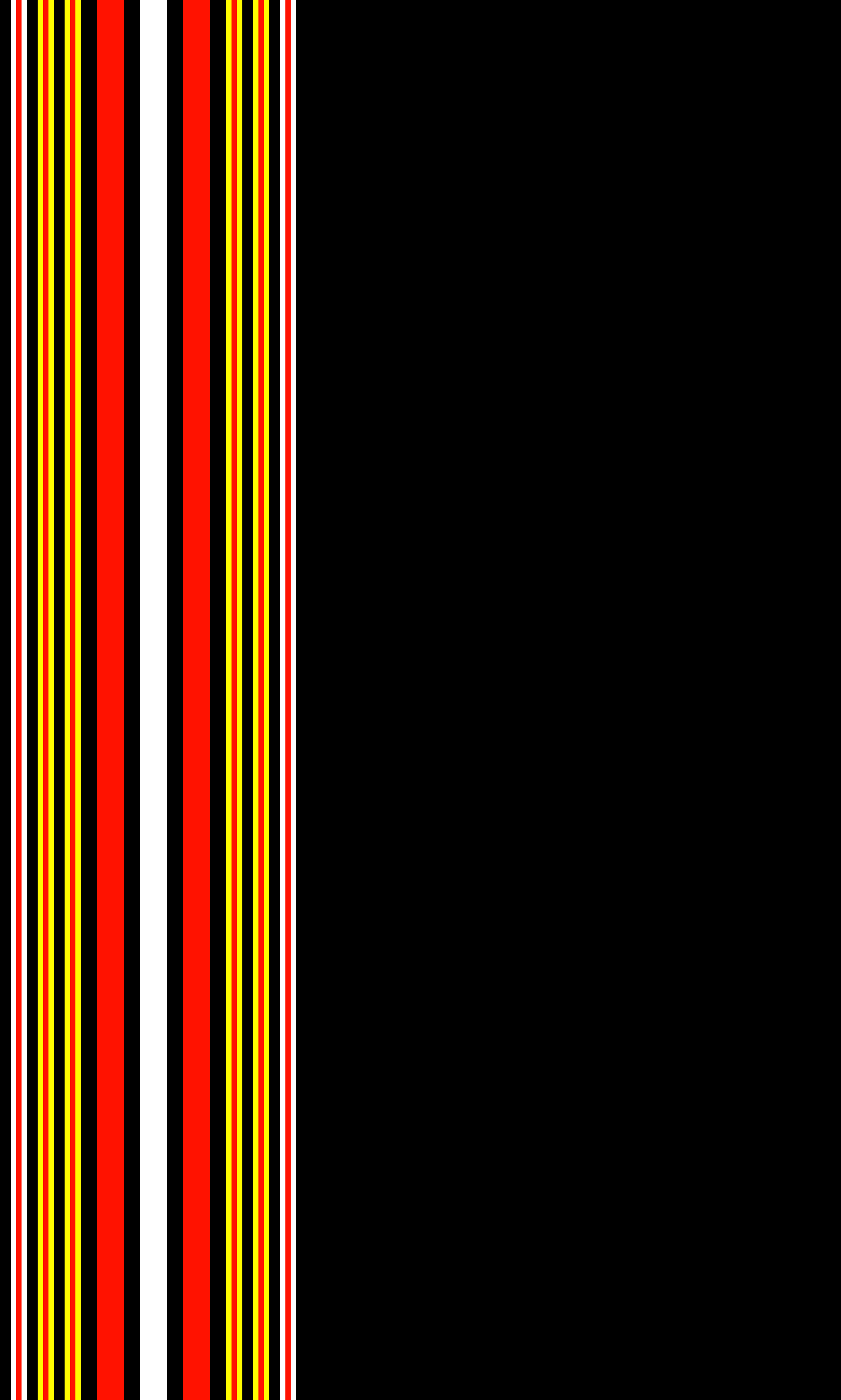
Example of Tawlhoh Puan (transl. Puan of No Retreat) pattern.

Handloom weaving is a traditional and widely practiced art in Mizo culture and communities. The most significant handloom product is the traditional fabric known as puan. The puan is still worn and utilised in key festivals and festivities. While traditionally, the puan was worn by both men and women, it is now predominantly worn by women. A typical ritual in Mizo society involves a woman to bring puan to the grooms house after marriage and name it Thuam Chhawm. There are five puans that have played a crucial part in distinguishing Mizo culture and given a geographic indicator tag. The five puans are: Hmaram, Pawndum, Puanchei, Ngotekherh and Tawlhloh puan.

A Puanchei is a multicolored striped Puan typically use as a traditional wedding garment for Mizo brides. The horizontal stripes of a puanchei are known as Sakeizangzia which allude to the stripes of a tiger. Common colour combinations of puanchei include red, green, yellow, black, blue, pink and white. Ngotekherh is traditionally known as Puan Hruih and consists of black and white stripes. It is worn for all festivals such as Chapchâr Kût, Mim Kût, and Pâwl Kût. Colour combinations for Ngotekherh are red, green, pink, black and white. Pawndum is usually woven in black, yellow and white stripes. It is typically included in the trousseau of a Mizo bride and traditionally used to cover her husband's body after his death. It is also used in mourning and condolence for respect of the dead. Tawlhloh Puan is an indigo-colored dress with red and green stripes. This is traditionally worn by warriors on the battleground but is treated as a prestige attire in current times.

Traditional Mizo clothing before the onset of Christianity saw the puan worn by both men and women, with jewellery being worn and adorned by men. The evolution of Western garb led to a decline in the use of the puan in male attire and the shedding of male jewellery by the 1960s. On the other hand, the evolution of women's fashion did not see a decline in the use of puan, even with the establishment of Christianity in Mizo culture. While some fashion trends were slow due to unaffordability or cultural values, the events of World War 2 saw many Mizo women integrate into the workforce, such as hospitality, medicine, and clerical work, which changed Mizo fashion. This led to a rise in Western clothing trends through working clothes such as uniforms made of skirts, coat suits, dresses, frocks and facial cosmetics.

== Performing arts ==
Cheraw Dance

Mizo people have a number of dances which are accompanied with few musical instrument like the gong and drum. The different dances of Mizoram are Cheraw dance, Khuallam, Chheihlam, Chailam, Tlanglam, Sarlamkai and Chawnglaizawn.

Cheraw dance means bamboo dance. It is the most famous dance among Mizo communities. Cheraw was performed as part of a sacrifice to appease bad spirits responsible for the death of a child. The dance was believed to usher safe passage and victorious entry to pialrâl. Women dance by stepping in and out between and across pairs of bamboo sticks held against the ground by people sitting face to face. Cheraw has shared a long history with Mizo tribes and have assumed to be around as early as their entry into the Chin Hills in the 13th Century. Before the onset of Christianity, Cheraw was used to appease ramhuai (transl. evil spirits) which were seen as responsible for all misfortune. The dance was traditionally performed as part of a sacrifice to propitiate the spirits on the death of a child. In the afterlife, a child has to encounter Pu Pawla (afterlife figure) to enter pialrâl. If a Cheraw is performed for the deceased child, then it is permitted to enter pialrâl safely. Cheraw was therefore a dance of sanctification and redemption.

Sarlamkai is a dance originating from Pawi and Lakher communities. This dance was used in the context of war. After a raid or battle, a ceremony is performed to deride the vanquished; beheaded warriors will remain slaves to the victors in their afterlife. There is no singing in the performance as it relies solely on rhythm from gongs, cymbals and drums. Boys and girls stand in a circle with the leader dressed as a warrior uttering slogans of victory.

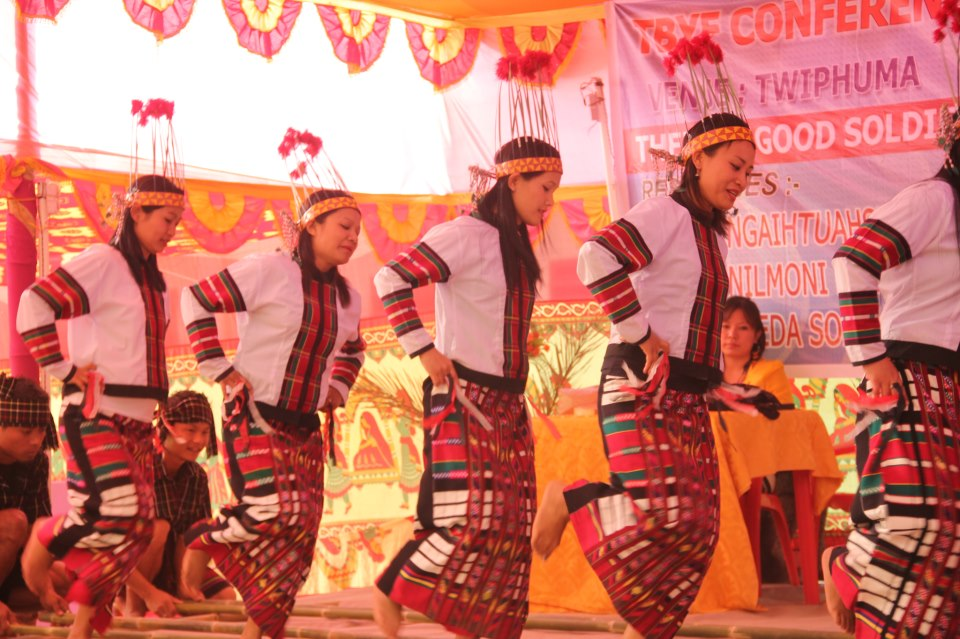

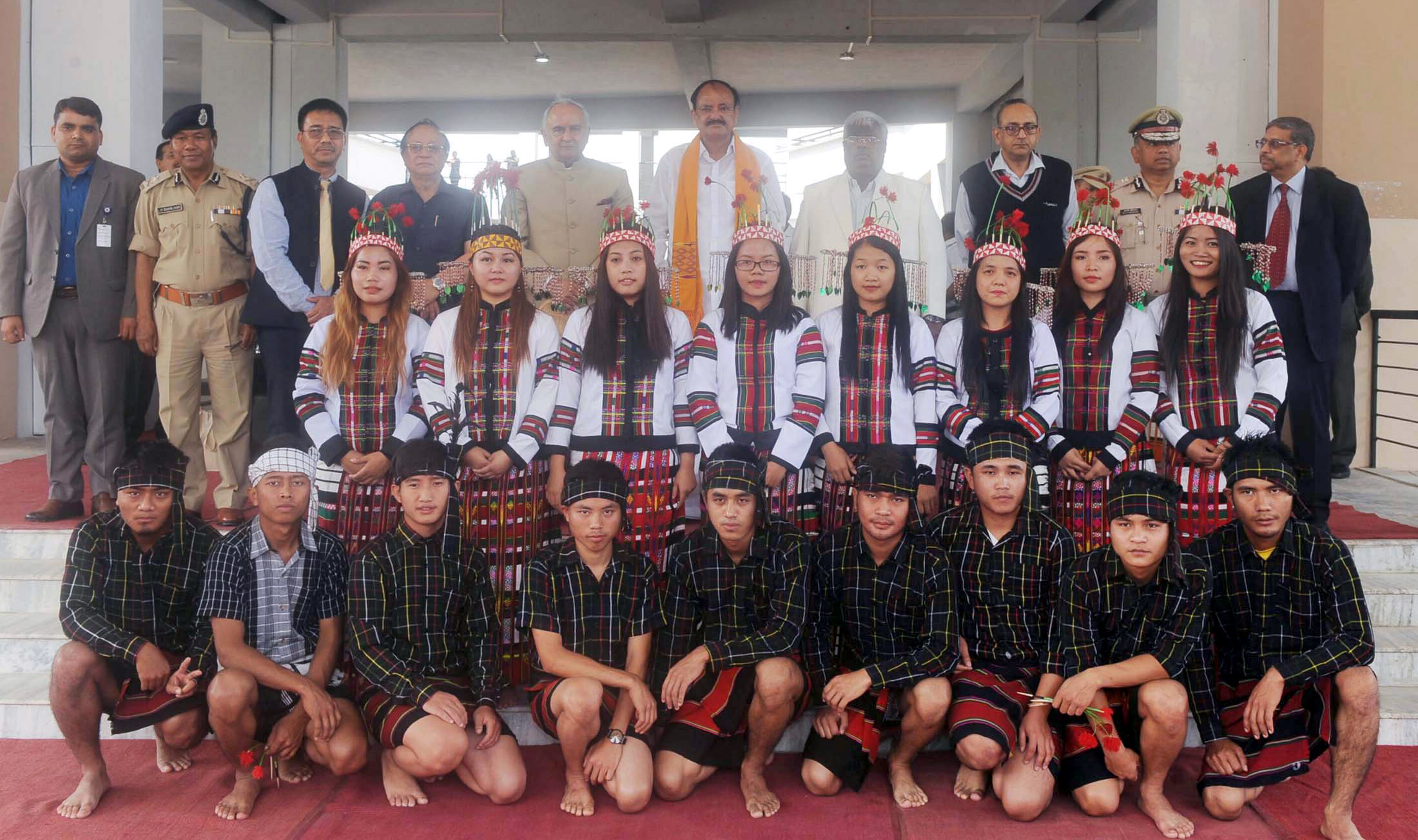

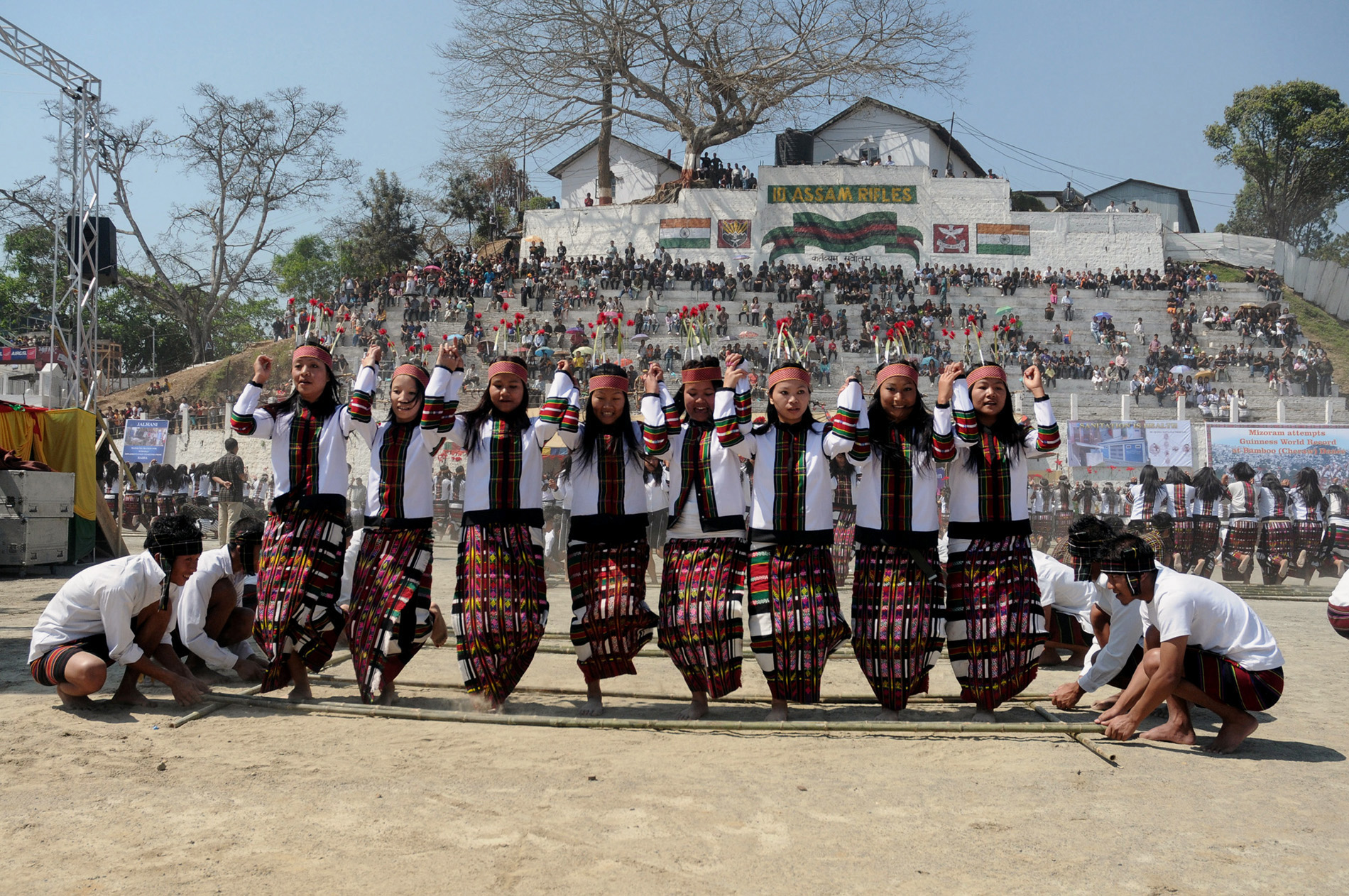

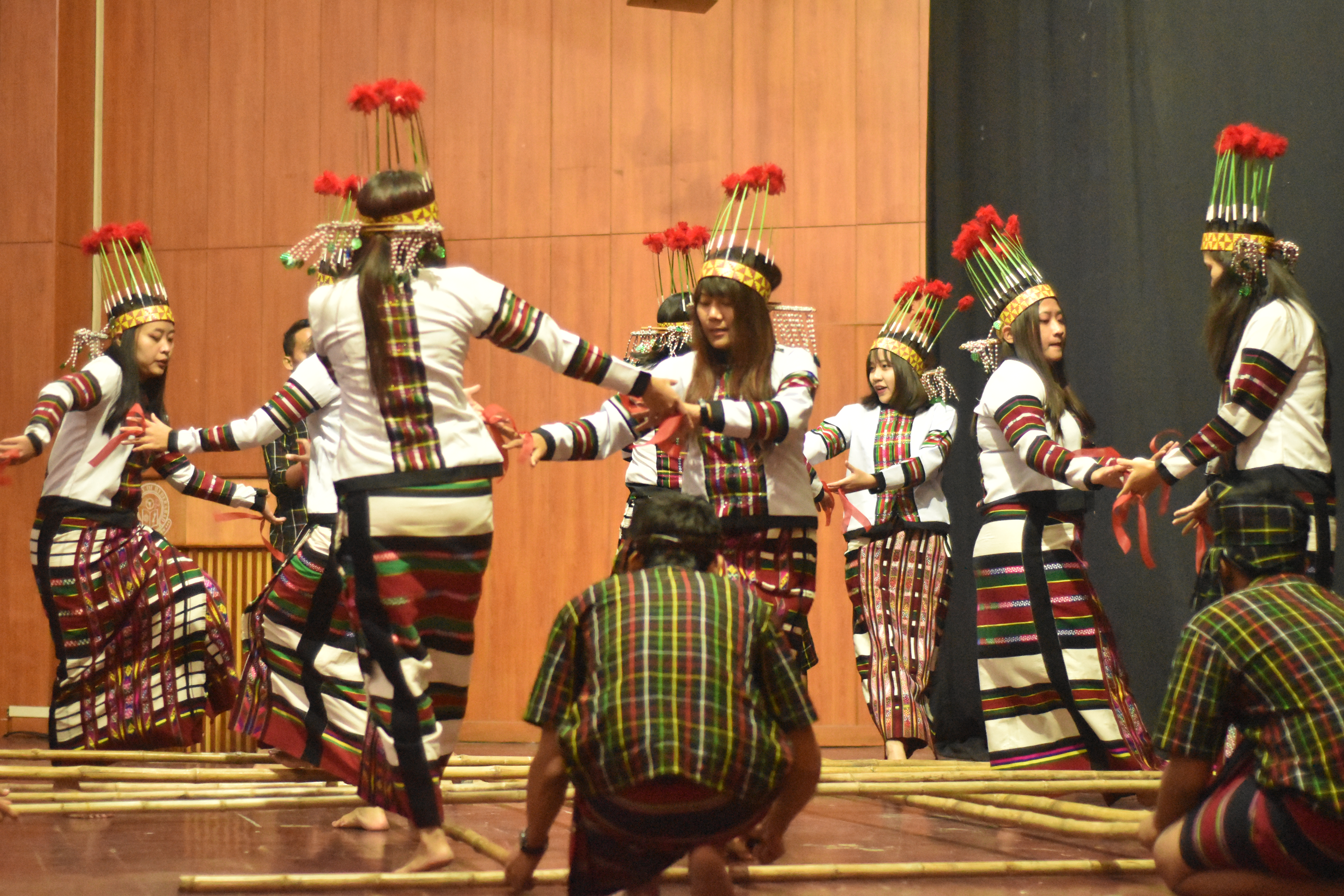

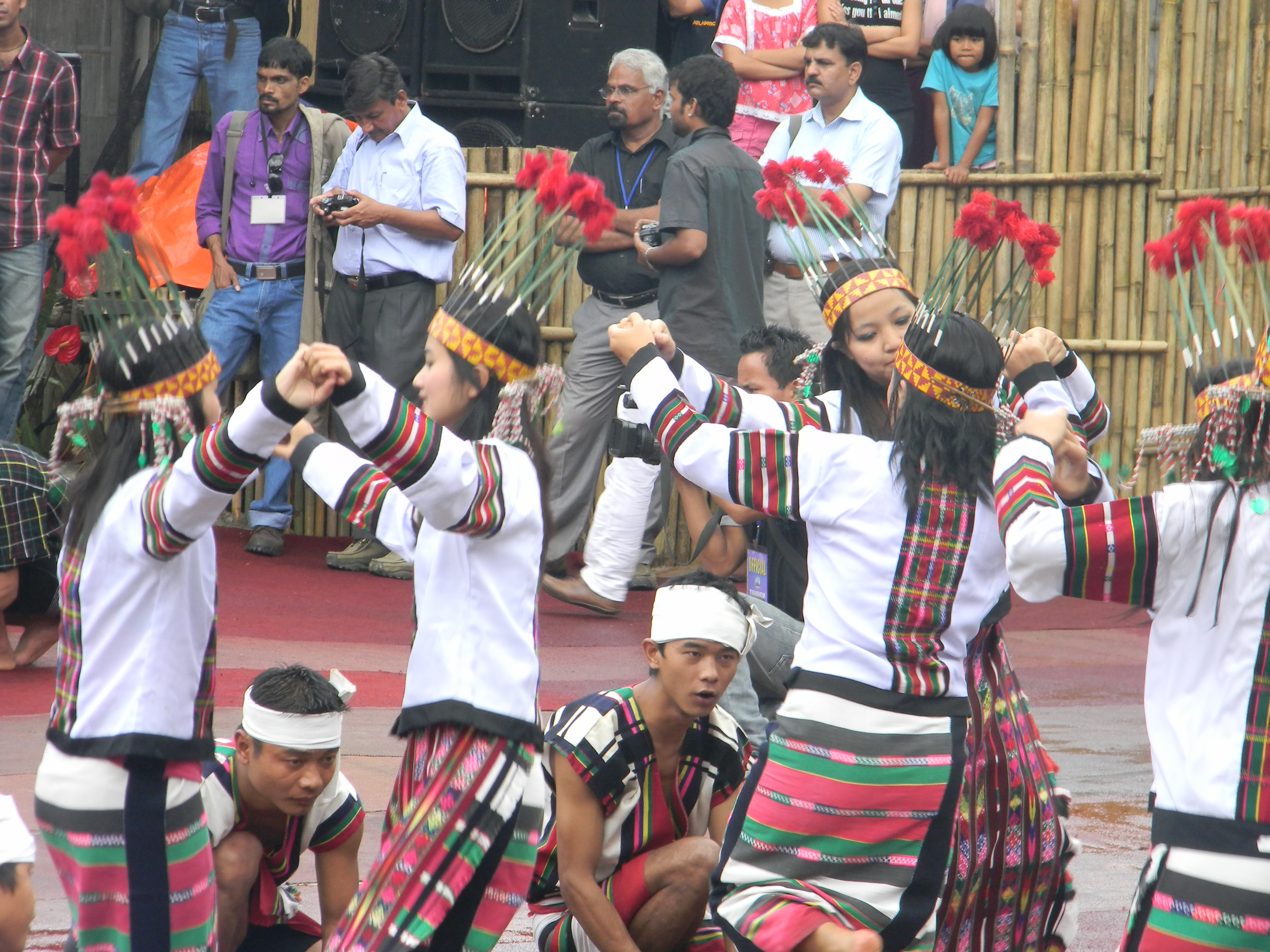

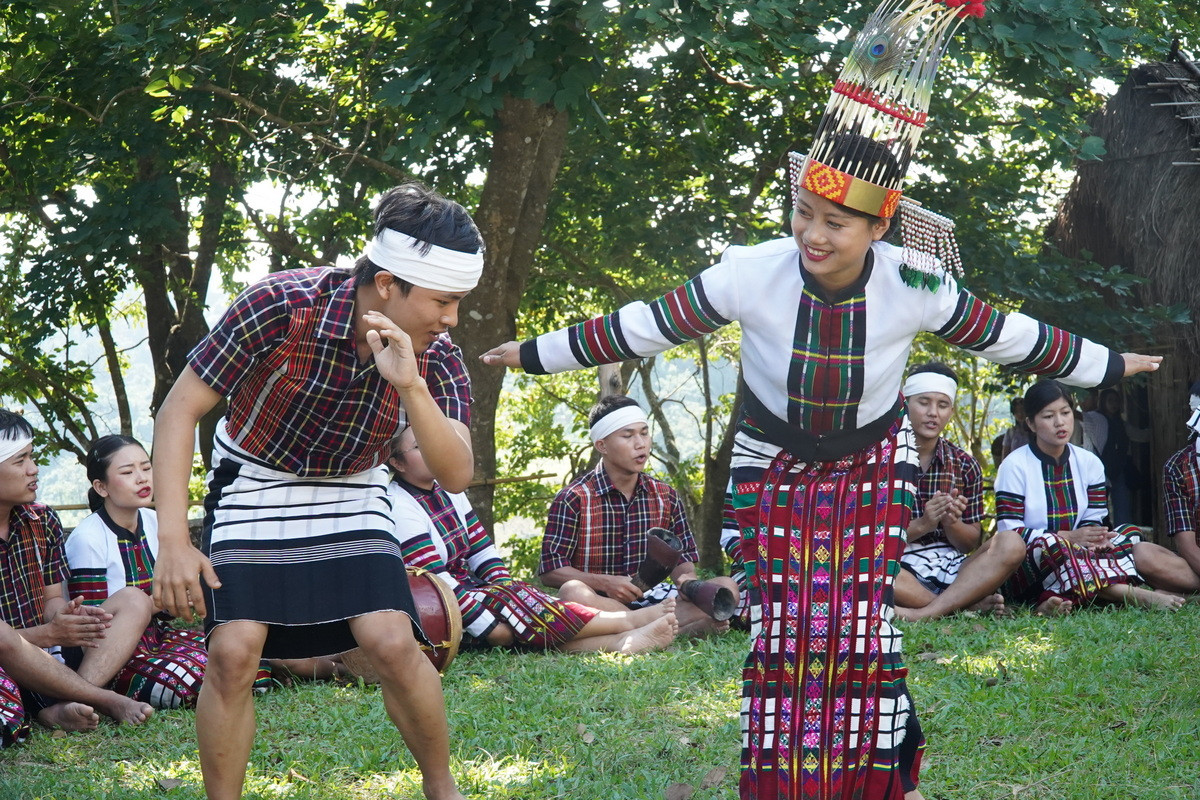

Khuallam means the guest dance. This dance was performed by a group of ten or more people. It was traditionally performed by honoured invitees while entering the arena of a feast known as khuangchawi. The party would dance in the village streets while wearing puandum. It was typically performed in a ceremony of a Thangchhuah to celebrate a hunter's success and prestige as an elite in traditional Mizo society. The feastgiver of the Khuangchawi festival was to kill two mithun and a pig for the village. The feastgiver would send a special message consisting of forked bamboo with ginger and white feathers. The messengers would observe strict silence and carry the message to the father-in-law to affix it into the wall in his house. It was obligatory for a father-in-law receiving the message to organize dancing party of young men and women who would travel to the feastgiver's village. As the party danced and entered the khuangchawi ceremony they became known as guests and hence khuallum a guest dance. This dance would traditionally be performed by men and include gongs.

Chai is the dance performed during the Chapchâr Kût festival. Boys and girls stand in a circle alternately with their hands on each other's shoulders. Inside the circle, musicians such as drummers and horn players would stand and play a rhythm to dance on. The Chai song is sung along the performance.

Tlang lam is a dance where boys and girls clap their hands together while moving. Leg movements included three steps forward and three steps back and were done to the tune of puma zai.

Chheih lam is a dance performed by a single person of either gender. A group would sit on short stools in a circle around the dancer until the dancer would become tired and request another dancer to tag in and continue the performance. The circle would clap while musicians beat drums in an out circle. It emerged after 1900 from a song known as puma zai and an older dance known as Tlangam. The dance is accompanied with a song called Chheih hla. The lyrics are impromptu and spontaneous improvisations recounting heroic deeds and escapatades. This was typically performed by the elderly folks with zû (rice beer). Cheih refers to an exclamation of joy or ecstasy in the context of making a big physical effort or to boost morale.

Chawnglaizawn is a popular dance with folk origins of the Pawi people. It is performed during a festival or to celebrate hunting trophies of hunters. Colourful shawls are used throughout the performance, and both boys and girls participate to the beat of a drum at a higher tempo than usual.

Zangtalam is a popular dance from the Pahitê clan. This dance is performed by both men and women. The dancers sing along, while the drummer is the leader and director of the dance and paces the performance. The dance consists of few steps.

Rallu Lam is a performance which can sometimes function as a dance. Traditionally when a pasalṭha returned from a raid they are celebrated by the village. The exploits of the pasaltha is performed and reenacted. Rallu Lam carries variation on a village by village basis.

Sakei Lu Lam refers to a ceremonial dance used in a Sai Ah ceremony when a tiger is killed. Since a tiger was a sacred animal, the spirit of one had to be appeased. The hunter would dress in female clothes and arm himself with a loaded gun. He would then eat a hard boiled egg to show fear of the tiger. The killed tiger's head would be brought a special spot decorated with bamboo posts demarcating the tiger's spirit. The hunter would do a blank at the tiger's head to start the consumption of zû and group dancing. The dance would function around the post erected for the tiger's head.

== Cuisine ==
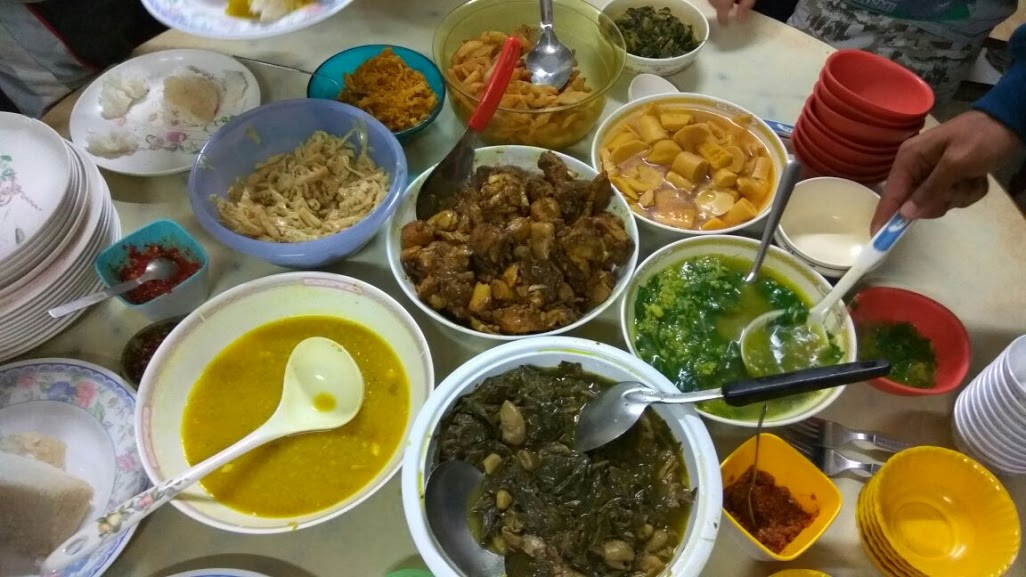
Typical Mizo Food Including stable rice, bai, non veg and hmarcha rawt

Mizoram shares characteristics to other regions of Northeast India and North India. The staple food of most of the Mizo people is rice, with meat and vegetables served on the side, ranging from the homely bai, a simple vegetable stew, non veg stew with sesame, garlic, onion and herbs.

Zû is also a traditional Mizo rice beer. It was made from husked rice through a distillation process. This responsibility was typically handled by the youth of the village such as zawlbûk men or maidens for festivals such as Chapchâr Kût, Mim Kût, Thalfavang Kût, marriage and feasts in the village. Zû was never used for commercial purposes; it was typically localised to collective drinking in zawlbûks (Male dormitories).

== Traditional calendar ==
The Mizo indigenous calendar was centred around the culture of Jhum cultivation. Thla denotes month in Mizo.

Mizo Indigenous Calendar
Month	Meaning
Pâwl kût thla (January)	Pawl means straw, while kût means festival. This is named after a festival before the felling of trees for the new jhum field.
Ramtuk thla (February)	Ram means forest or jungle while Tuk means cut or felling. This month oversaw the felling of trees after the jhum plots were selected.
Vau thla (March)	Vau is the flower of bauhinia variegata that flowered in this month. This showed the onset of a new season.
Tau thla (April)	Tau is a local berry (Rubus ellipticus) that ripens in this month. This month is for clearing the slash-burned logs and stums and preparing the jhum.
Tomir thla (May)	Tomir means rain which was decided as the best time for seeding the jhum fields with crops.
Nikir thla (June)	Nikir means the return of the sun, which is an acknowledgement of the summer solstice.
Vawkhniakzawn thla (July)	Vawkhniakzawn means the footsteps of pigs. This is an acknowledgment of the month with heaviest rainfall.
Thi tin thla (August)	Thi means die and tin means leaving. This was a sacred month for the mourning of family members and ancestors. This was due to the belief that when people died, they stayed in their village until this month arrived before making their journey to pialrâl.
Mim kût thla (September)	Mim means corn (job's tears) and kut is festival. Hence this month was dedicated to the celebration of harvesting corn.
Khuangchawi thla (October)	Khuangchawi is a concept in Mizo society where the rich and wealthy host celebrations and community feasts. This was a month of relaxation after the weeding of jhum fields.
Sahmulphah thla (November)	Sahmul means fur while phah means 'lay down', which indicated the onset of winter. Preparations for winter included harvesting of fur.
Pâwltlak thla (December)	Pâwl means straw and tlak means complete. This signified the harvesting of crops and rice paddies and the new years celebration.

== Sources ==
- Lianhmingthanga (1998). Material Culture of the Mizo. Mizoram: Tribal Research Institute.
- Lalthangliana, B.; Palkhiwala, Kalapana (2005). Culture and Folklore of Mizoram. Publications Division, Ministry of Information & Broadcasting, Government of India.
- Pachuau, Joy L. K. (2014). Being Mizo: Identity and Belonging in Northeast India. Oxford University Press. ISBN 9780199451159.
- Pachuau, Joy L. K.; van Schendel, Willem (2015). The Camera as Witness. Cambridge University Press. pp. 8–9. ISBN 978-1-107-07339-5.
- Verghese, C.G.; Thanzawna, R.L. (1997). A History of the Mizos. New Delhi: Vikas Publishing House.
