= 9th Mizoram Legislative Assembly =

2024 legislature of Mizoram, India

The 9th Mizoram Legislative Assembly was constituted in January, 2023. It represents the northeastern state of Mizoram, India. Election results were announced on 4 December 2023. The Zoram People's Movement, which was not represented in the 8th Assembly, won a majority of seats. The 9th Assembly marks the first time that more than one woman was elected to represent Mizoram since elections began in 1972.

== Members of Legislative Assembly ==
District	No.	Constituency	Name	Party	Remarks
Mamit	1	Hachhek	Robert Romawia Royte	Mizo National Front	
Mamit	2	Dampa	Lalrintluanga Sailo	Mizo National Front	Died on 21 July 2025
Mamit	2	Dampa	R. Lalthangliana	Mizo National Front	Elected on 14 November 2025
Mamit	3	Mamit	H. Lalzirliana	Mizo National Front	
Kolasib	4	Tuirial	K. Laldawngliana	Mizo National Front	
Kolasib	5	Kolasib	Lalfamkima	Zoram People's Movement	
Kolasib	6	Serlui	Lalrinsanga Ralte	Mizo National Front	
Aizawl	7	Tuivawl	Lalchhandama Ralte	Mizo National Front	Leader of Opposition
Aizawl	8	Chalfilh	Lalbiakzama	Zoram People's Movement	
Aizawl	9	Tawi	Lalnilawma	Zoram People's Movement	
Aizawl	10	Aizawl North 1	Vanlalhlana	Zoram People's Movement	
Aizawl	11	Aizawl North 2	Vanlalthlana	Zoram People's Movement	
Aizawl	12	Aizawl North 3	K. Sapdanga	Zoram People's Movement	
Aizawl	13	Aizawl East 1	Lalthansanga	Zoram People's Movement	
Aizawl	14	Aizawl East 2	B. Lalchhanzova	Zoram People's Movement	
Aizawl	15	Aizawl West 1	T. B. C. Lalvenchhunga	Zoram People's Movement	
Aizawl	16	Aizawl West 2	Lalnghinglova Hmar	Zoram People's Movement	
Aizawl	17	Aizawl West 3	V. L. Zaithanzama	Zoram People's Movement	
Aizawl	18	Aizawl South 1	C. Lalsawivunga	Zoram People's Movement	
Aizawl	19	Aizawl South 2	Lalchhuanthanga	Zoram People's Movement	
Aizawl	20	Aizawl South 3	Baryl Vanneihsangi	Zoram People's Movement	
Champhai	21	Lengteng	F. Rodingliana	Zoram People's Movement	
Champhai	22	Tuichang	W. Chhuanawma	Zoram People's Movement	
Champhai	23	Champhai North	H. Ginzalala	Zoram People's Movement	
Champhai	24	Champhai South	C. Lalhmingthanga	Zoram People's Movement	
Champhai	25	East Tuipui	Ramthanmawia	Mizo National Front	
Serchhip	26	Serchhip	Lalduhoma	Zoram People's Movement	Chief Minister
Serchhip	27	Tuikum	P. C. Vanlalruata	Zoram People's Movement	
Serchhip	28	Hrangturzo	Lalmuanpuia Punte	Zoram People's Movement	
Lunglei	29	South Tuipui	Jeje Lalpekhlua	Zoram People's Movement	
Lunglei	30	Lunglei North	V. Malsawmtluanga	Zoram People's Movement	
Lunglei	31	Lunglei East	Lalrinpuii	Zoram People's Movement	
Lunglei	32	Lunglei West	T. Lalhlimpuia	Zoram People's Movement	
Lunglei	33	Lunglei South	Lalramliana Papuia	Zoram People's Movement	
Lunglei	34	Thorang	R. Rohmingliana	Mizo National Front	
Lunglei	35	West Tuipui	Prova Chakma	Mizo National Front	
Lawngtlai	36	Tuichawng	Rasik Mohan Chakma	Mizo National Front	
Lawngtlai	37	Lawngtlai West	C. Ngunlianchunga	Indian National Congress	
Lawngtlai	38	Lawngtlai East	L. Lalpekliana Chinzah	Zoram People's Movement	
Saiha	39	Saiha	K. Beichhua	Bharatiya Janata Party	
Saiha	40	Palak	Pushpa K. Hrahmo	Bharatiya Janata Party	
