= 2018 Mizoram Legislative Assembly election =

State assembly election in India

- 28 November 2018

All 40 seats in the Mizoram Legislative Assembly 21 seats needed for a majority
- Turnout: 81.61% (▼1.8%)
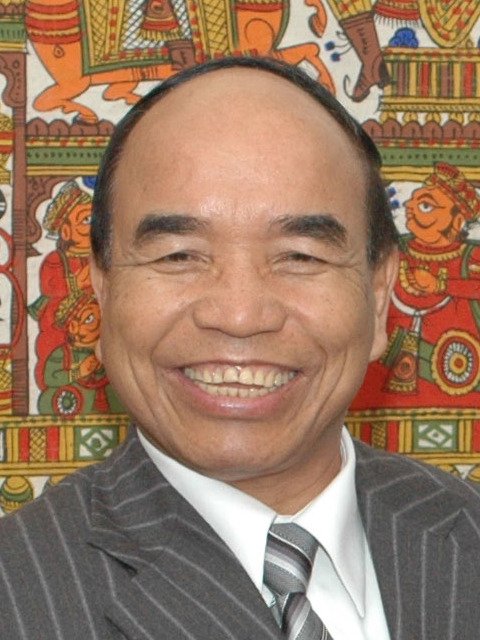

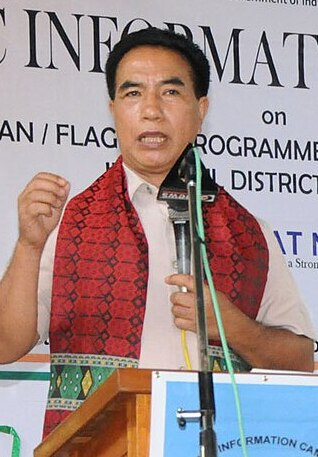

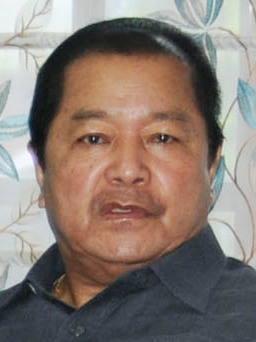
	Majority party	Minority party	Third party
Leader	Zoramthanga	Lalduhawma	Lal Thanhawla
Party	MNF	ZPM	INC
Leader since	2008	2018	2008
Leader's seat	Aizawl East 1	Serchhip	Champhai South and Serchhip (both lost)
Seats before	6	0	34
Seats won	26	8	5
Seat change	▲20	▲8	▼29
Percentage	37.70%	22.9%	29.98%
Swing	▲8.4%	▼1.5%	▼14.6%
CM before election
Lal Thanhawla
INC
Elected CM
Zoramthanga
MNF

The legislative assembly election was held on 28 November 2018 to elect members of the 40 constituencies in Mizoram. Mizo National Front won 26 seats in the election. This was the first time that Congress does not have any government in any of the states in Northeast India.

== Background ==
The tenure of Mizoram Legislative Assembly was due to end on 15 December 2018.

Four high-profile leaders of the Congress including the Speaker of the Legislative Assembly in Mizoram defected to the BJP before the polls.

== Schedule ==
The Election Commission of India has announced the poll dates on 6 October 2018. It was held in single phase on 28 November 2018. The result was declared on 11 December 2018.

Event	Date	Day
Date for Nominations	2 Nov 2018	Friday
Last Date for filing Nominations	9 Nov 2018	Friday
Date for scrutiny of nominations	12 Nov 2018	Monday
Last date for withdrawal of candidatures	14 Nov 2018	Wednesday
Date of poll	28 Nov 2018	Wednesday
Date of counting	11 Dec 2018	Tuesday
Date before which the election shall be completed	13 Dec 2018	Thursday

== Exit polls ==
Polling agency	BJP	INC	MNF	Others	Source
CVoter - Republic TV	NA	14-18	16-20	0-3	
CNX - Times Now	0	16	18	6	
Axis My India - India Today and Aaj Tak	NA	08-12	16-22	01-12	

== Protests against chief electoral officer ==
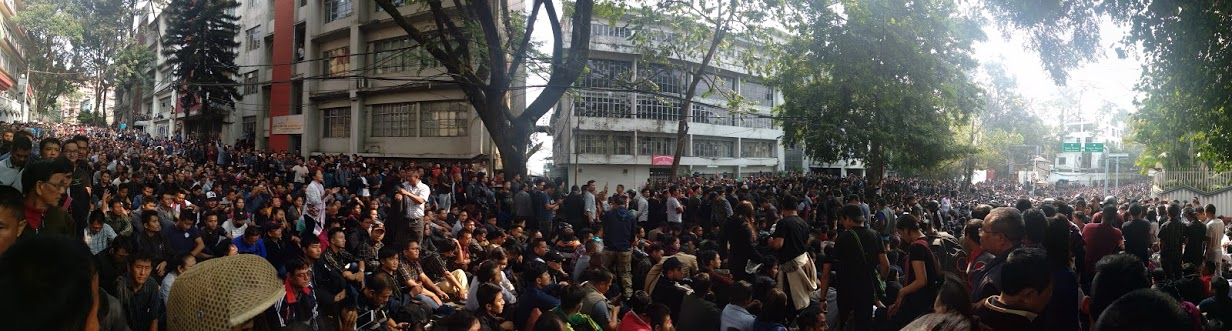
Protest against the Chief Electoral Officer in Aizawl

On the eve of the election, there were protests against the chief electoral officer (CEO) Sashank. The state government wanted the Reang people living in camps in the neighboring state of Tripura, who are registered voters for the elections in Mizoram, to travel to Mizoram, the CEO sided with the groups representing the Reang people, who wanted to vote from Tripura. The CEO alleged interference by the principal secretary Lalnunmawia Chuaungo and wrote to the election commission in the last week of October, alleging interference from the state government in the conduct of the elections. Subsequently, the election commission issued orders to the state government to remove Chuaungo with immediate effect. People led by Young Mizo Association and consisting of Mizo Hmeichhe Insuihkhawm Pawl and other student bodies, took to the streets in Aizawl demanding removal of CEO Sashank and reinstatement of Chaungo. Eventually the election commission recalled Sashank and appointed Ashish Kundra as the new CEO.

== Result ==
Parties and coalitions	Popular vote			Seats	
Parties and coalitions	Votes	%	± %	Won	+/−
Mizo National Front	2,38,168	37.7%	▲9.0	26	▲21
Indian National Congress	1,89,404	29.98%	▼14.6	5	▼29
Zoram People's Movement	1,44,925	22.9%	▼1.5	8	▲5
Bharatiya Janata Party	51,087	8.09%	▲7.6	1	▲1
Others	8,211	1.3%	▼0.7	0	0
Total	6,31,597	100.00		40	±0
Valid votes	6,31,597	99.90			
Invalid votes	658	0.10			
Votes cast / turnout	6,32,255	81.61			
Abstentions	1,42,502	18.39			
Registered voters	7,74,757				

=== District wise results ===
District	Seats				
District	Seats	MNF	ZPM	INC	BJP
Mamit	3	2	—N/a	1	—N/a
Kolasib	3	2	1	—N/a	—N/a
Aizawl	14	8	6	—N/a	—N/a
Champhai	5	5	—N/a	—N/a	—N/a
Serchhip	3	2	1	—N/a	—N/a
Lunglei	7	5	—N/a	2	—N/a
Lawngtlai	3	1	—N/a	1	1
Saiha	2	2	—N/a	—N/a	—N/a
Total	40	27	8	4	1

== Constituency results ==
Results
Assembly Constituency		Winner				Runner Up				Margin
#	Name	Candidate	Party	Votes	%	Candidate	Party	Votes	%	Margin
Mamit District
1	Hachhek	Lalrindika Râlte	INC	6202	33.32	Lalrinenga Sailo	MNF	5836	31.36	366
2	Dampa	Lalrintluanga Sailo	MNF	5840	37.99	Lalrobiaka	INC	4183	27.21	1657
3	Mamit	H. Lalzirliana	MNF	6874	35.39	John Rotluangliana	INC	6467	33.29	407
Kolasib District
4	Tuirial	Andrew H. Thangliana	ZPM	4387	30.80	Sailothanga Sailo	MNF	4183	29.36	204
5	Kolasib	K. Lalrinliana	MNF	5940	33.34	Lalfamkima	ZPM	5661	31.77	279
6	Serlui	Lalrinsanga Ralte	MNF	6128	38.17	Lalhmachhuana	INC	5201	32.39	927
Aizawl District
7	Tuivawl	Lalchhandama Ralte	MNF	5207	39.41	R. L. Pianmawia	INC	5204	39.39	3
8	Chalfilh	Lalrinliana Sailo	MNF	5541	36.99	F. Rualhleia	ZPM	4534	30.27	1007
9	Tawi	R Lalzirliana	MNF	4940	37.35	R. Lalthatluanga	ZPM	4756	35.96	184
10	Aizawl North 1	Vanlalhlana	ZPM	7094	40.09	Lalringliana	MNF	5929	33.51	1165
11	Aizawl North 2	Vanlalthlana	ZPM	7775	42.93	Laltlanzova Khiangte	MNF	5974	32.98	1801
12	Aizawl North 3	C. Lalmanpuia	MNF	5166	35.21	Lal Thanzara	INC	4732	32.25	434
13	Aizawl East 1	Zoramthanga	MNF	8358	42.75	K. Sapdanga	ZPM	5854	29.94	2504
14	Aizawl East 2	Robert Romawia Royte	MNF	5869	41.26	B. Lalchhanzova	ZPM	4377	30.77	1492
15	Aizawl West 1	Lalduhoma	ZPM	7889	38.71	K. Sangthuama	MNF	6829	33.51	1060
16	Aizawl West 2	Lalruatkima	MNF	7626	45.20	Lalmalsawma Nghaka	INC	4906	29.08	2720
17	Aizawl West 3	V. L. Zaithanzama	ZPM	6934	41.22	Vanlalzawma	MNF	5908	35.12	1026
18	Aizawl South 1	C. Lalsawivunga	ZPM	6808	39.59	K. Liantinga	MNF	5759	33.49	1049
19	Aizawl South 2	Lalchhuanthanga	ZPM	7294	37.44	Denghmingthanga	MNF	7115	36.52	179
20	Aizawl South 3	F. Lalnunmawia	MNF	7558	43.47	K. S. Shanga	INC	5470	31.46	2088
Champhai District
21	Lengteng	L. Thangmawia	MNF	6430	45.77	H. Rohluna	INC	4658	33.45	1772
22	Tuichang	Tawnluia	MNF	5146	39.52	W. Chhuanawma	ZPM	4407	33.85	739
23	Champhai North	Z. R. Thiamsanga	MNF	6057	41.08	T. T. Zothansanga	INC	4964	33.67	1093
24	Champhai South	T. J. Lalnantluanga	MNF	5212	36.45	Lal Thanhawla	INC	4163	29.11	1049
25	East Tuipui	Ramthanmawia	MNF	4384	37.32	C. Lalthanpuia	ZPM	3797	32.33	587
Sercchip District
26	Serchhip	Lalduhoma	ZPM	5481	35.26	Lal Thanhawla	INC	5071	32.63	410
27	Tuikum	Er. Lalrinawma	MNF	5439	39.85	Sangzela Tlau	INC	4042	29.62	1397
28	Hrangturzo	Lalchamliana	MNF	4572	35.62	Vanlalawmpuii Chawngthu	INC	3815	29.72	757
Lunglei District
29	South Tuipui	R Lalthangliana	MNF	6126	49.69	John Siamkunga	INC	4657	37.78	1469
30	Lunglei North	Vanlaltanpuia	MNF	5022	35.26	V. Malsawmtluanga	ZPM	4627	32.49	395
31	Lunglei East	Lawmawma Tochhawng	MNF	4063	32.91	Lalrinpuii	ZPM	3991	32.32	72
32	Lunglei West	C. Lalrinsanga	MNF	4093	34.44	Chalrosanga Ralte	INC	4016	33.79	77
33	Lunglei South	K. Pachhunga	MNF	6245	43.03	R. Lalnunthara	INC	3804	26.21	2441
34	Thorang	Zodintluanga Ralte	INC	4549	39.79	R. Rohmingliana	MNF	3276	28.66	1273
35	West Tuipui	Nihar Kanti Chakma	INC	5943	45.83	Kina Ranjan Chakma	BJP	3558	27.44	2385
Lawngtlai District
36	Tuichawng	Buddha Dhan Chakma	BJP	11419	43.68	Rasik Mohan Chakma	MNF	9825	37.59	1594
37	Lawngtlai West	C. Ngunlianchunga	INC	10681	48.87	C. Ramhluna	MNF	9885	45.23	796
38	Lawngtlai East	H. Biakzaua	MNF	8656	48.40	H. Zothangliana	INC	7712	43.12	944
Saiha District
39	Saiha	K. Beichhua	MNF	8109	49.82	S. Hiato	INC	5641	34.66	2468
40	Palak	M. Chakhu	MNF	5492	37.44	Hiphei	BJP	4648	31.68	844

== See also ==
- Elections in India
- 2018 elections in India
