= List of ministers of home affairs of Mizoram =

Government Ministry of Mizoram

Minister of Home Affairs
- Emblem of Mizoram

- Flag of India
- Incumbent; K. Sapdanga since 8 December 2023
- Home Department
- Style: The Honourable
- Abbreviation: HM
- Member of: Mizoram Legislative Assembly
- Reports to: Governor of Mizoram; Chief Minister of Mizoram
- Appointer: Governor on the advice of the Chief Minister
- Formation: 3 May 1972 (54 years ago)
- First holder: C. Chhunga

The Minister of Home Affairs (or simply, the Home Minister, short-form HM) is the head of Home Department of the Government of Mizoram. One of the senior-most officers in the Cabinet of Mizoram, the chief responsibility of the home minister is the maintenance of internal security and domestic policy. Occasionally, they are assisted by the Minister of State of Home Affairs.

The current minister is K. Sapdanga of the Zoram People's Movement who has been in office since 8 December 2023.

== List of home affairs ==
Legend: for each row, the color is that of the political party.

No.	Minister	Term of office			Political party	Ministry	Chief Minister
No.	Minister	From	To	Period	Political party	Ministry	Chief Minister
1	C. Chhunga	3 May 1972	10 May 1977	5 years, 7 days	Mizo Union	Chhunga	Self
2	T. Sailo	2 June 1978	10 November 1978	161 days	Mizoram People's Conference	Sailo I	Self
2	T. Sailo	8 May 1979	4 May 1984	4 years, 362 days	Mizoram People's Conference	Sailo II	Self
3	Lal Thanhawla	5 May 1984	20 August 1986	2 years, 107 days	Indian National Congress	Thanhawla I	Self
4	Laldenga	21 August 1986	19 February 1987	2 years, 17 days	Mizo National Front	Laldenga I	Self
4	Laldenga	20 February 1987	7 September 1988	2 years, 17 days	Mizo National Front	Laldenga II	Self
5	C. L. Ruala	24 January 1989	7 December 1993		Indian National Congress	Thanhawla II	Lal Thanhawla
6	J. Lalsangzuala	8 December 1993	3 December 1998		Indian National Congress	Thanhawla III	Lal Thanhawla
7	Tawnluia	3 December 1998	4 December 2003	10 years, 8 days	Mizo National Front	Zoramthanga I	Zoramthanga
7	Tawnluia	4 December 2003	11 December 2008	10 years, 8 days	Mizo National Front	Zoramthanga II	Zoramthanga
8	R. Lalzirliana	11 December 2008	11 December 2013	10 years, 3 days	Indian National Congress	Thanhawla IV	Lal Thanhawla
8	R. Lalzirliana	12 December 2013	14 December 2018	10 years, 3 days	Indian National Congress	Thanhawla V	Lal Thanhawla
9	Lalchamliana	15 December 2018	7 December 2023	4 years, 357 days	Mizo National Front	Zoramthanga III	Zoramthanga
10	K. Sapdanga	8 December 2023	Incumbent	2 years, 273 days	Zoram People's Movement	Lalduhoma	Lalduhoma
