= Third Zoramthanga ministry =

- 13th Ministry of Mizoram
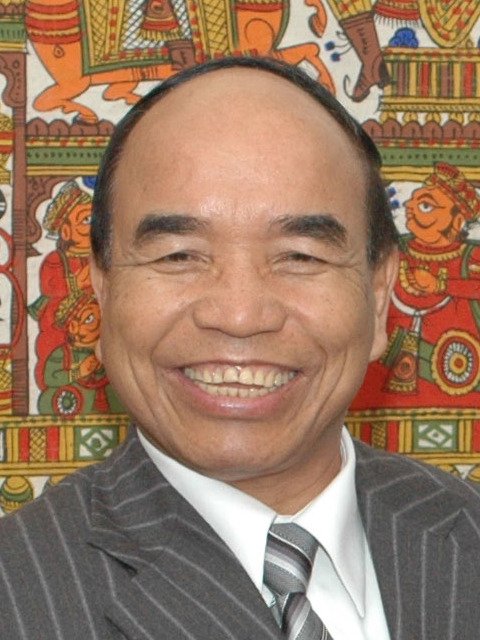
- Zoramthanga; Hon'ble Chief Minister of Mizoram
- Date formed: 15 December 2018
- Date dissolved: 3 December 2023

People and organisations
- Head of state: Governor; Kambhampati Hari Babu
- Head of government: Zoramthanga
- Deputy head of government: Tawnluia
- No. of ministers: 12
- Member parties: MNF
- Status in legislature: Majority
- Opposition party: ZPM
- Opposition leader: Lalduhawma

History
- Election: 2018
- Legislature term: 5 years
- Predecessor: Lal Thanhawla fifth ministry
- Successor: Lalduhoma ministry

The third Zoramthanga ministry is the third Cabinet assembled by Zoramthanga the then Chief Minister of Mizoram. His party, the Mizo National Front (MNF) secured an absolute majority in the 2018 elections.

Zoramthanga was elected leader of the party in the assembly and was sworn in as Chief Minister of Mizoram on 15 December 2018. He earlier served as Chief Minister for two terms from December 1998 to December 2008. The MNF captured 26 of the 40 seats in the state assembly.

== Council of Ministers ==
S.No	Name	Constituency	Department	Party
1.	Zoramthanga; Chief Minister	Aizawl East 1	Finance; Political & Cabinet; Planning & Programme Implementation; General Administration Department; Vigilance Department; Public Work Department; Horticulture Department	MNF
Deputy Chief Minister
2.	Tawnluia	Tuichang	Public Health Engineering Department; Urban Development & Poverty Alleviation Department; Personnel & Administrative Reforms	MNF
Cabinet Minister
3.	Dr. R Lalthangliana	South Tuipui	Health & Family Welfare; Higher & Technical Education; Commerce & Industry	MNF
4.	Lalchamliana	Hrangturzo	Home; Taxation; Disaster Management & Rehabilitation	MNF
5.	R Lalzirliana	Tawi	Power & Electricity; Arts & Culture; Land Resources, Soil & Water Conservation; District Council & Minority Affairs	MNF
6.	C Lalrinsanga	Lunglei West	Agriculture Dept.; Irrigation & Water Resources; Co-operation Department	MNF
7.	K Lalrinliana	Kolasib	Food, Civil Supplies & Consumer Affairs; LAD; Fisheries	MNF
8.	Lalchhandama Ralte	Tuivawl	School Education; Labour, Employment, Skill Development & Entrepreneurship; Printing & Stationery Department	MNF
9.	Lalruatkima	Aizawl West 2	Rural Development; Information & Public Relation; Land Revenue & Settlement Department	MNF
10.	Lalrinawma	Tuikum	Social Welfare & Tribal Affairs Department; Excise & Narcotics Department; Sericulture Department; Animal Husbandry &Veterinary Department	MNF

Ministers of State
SI No.	Name	Constituency	Department	Party
1.	T J Lalnuntluanga	Champhai South	Law & Judicial, Parliamentary Affairs; Transport; Environment, Forest & Climate Change Department	MNF
2.	Robert Romawia Royte	Aizawl East 2	Sports & Youth Services; Tourism; Information & Communication Technology	MNF
