= Government of Mizoram =

State government in India

- Seat of Government: Aizawl

Legislative branch
- Assembly: Mizoram Legislative Assembly
- Members in Assembly: 40

Executive branch
- Governor: V. K. Singh
- Chief Minister: Lalduhoma
- Chief Secretary: Khilli Ram Meena, IAS

Judiciary
- High Court: Aizawl Bench, Gauhati High Court
- Chief Justice: Ashutosh Kumar

The Government of Mizoram (Mizo: Mizoram Sawrkâr) also known as the State Government of Mizoram, or locally as State Government, is the supreme governing authority of the Indian state of Mizoram and its 11 districts. It consists of an executive, led by the Governor of Mizoram, a judiciary and a legislative branch.

Like other states of India, the head of the state of Mizoram is the Governor, appointed by the President of India on the advice of the Central government. The Chief Minister is the head of the government. Aizawl is the capital of Mizoram, and houses the Mizoram Legislative Assembly and the secretariat. The Gauhati High Court, located in Guwahati, Assam has an Aizawl Bench that exercises the jurisdiction and powers in respect of cases arising in the State of Mizoram.

The present Legislative Assembly of Mizoram is unicameral, consisting of 40 Member of the Legislative Assembly (M.L.A). Its term is 5 years, unless sooner dissolved.

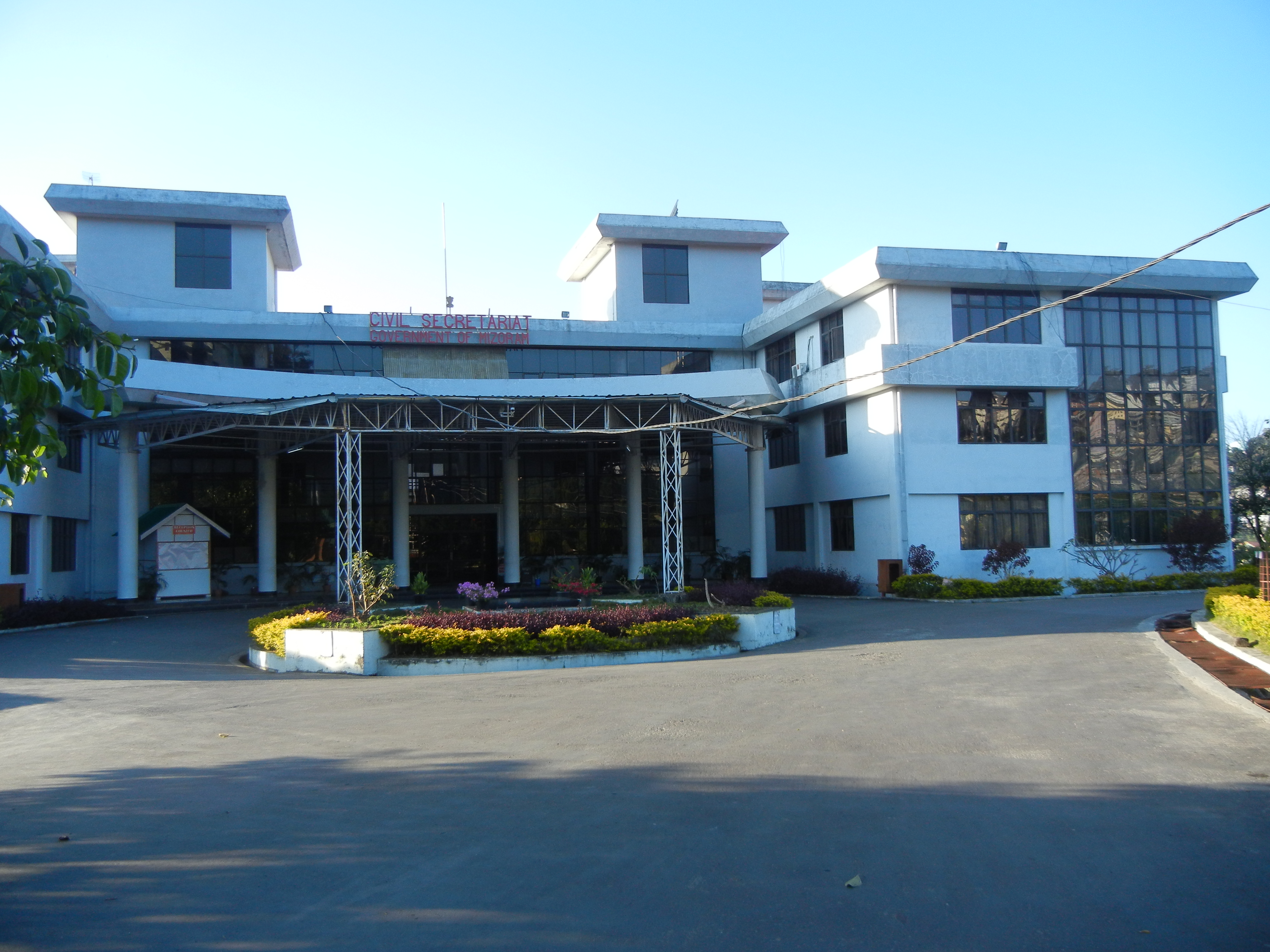
Mizoram Secretariat

== Council of Ministers ==
=== Cabinet Ministers ===
Portfolio	Minister	Took office	Left office	Party
Chief Minister and also in-charge of: Department of Finance; Department of Planning and Programme Implementation; Department of Vigilance; Department of General Administration; Department of Political and Cabinet; Department of Law and Judicial; And all other departments not specifically assigned to any minister.	Lalduhoma	8 December 2023	Incumbent	ZPM
Minister of Home; Minister of Urban Development and Poverty Alleviation; Minister of Personnel and Administrative Reforms; Minister of Disaster Management and Rehabilitation	K Sapdanga	8 December 2023	Incumbent	ZPM
Minister of Public Works; Minister of Transport; Minister of Parliamentary Affairs	Vanlalhlana	8 December 2023	Incumbent	ZPM
Minister of Local Administration; Minister of District Council and Minority Affairs; Minister of Art and Culture; Minister of Animal Husbandry and Veterinary	C. Lalsawivunga	8 December 2023	Incumbent	ZPM
Minister of Environment; Minister of Forests and Climate Change; Minister of Sericulture; Minister of Fisheries; Minister of Land Resources; Soil and Water Conservation	Lalthansanga	8 December 2023	Incumbent	ZPM
Minister of School Education; Minister of Higher and Technical Education; Minister of Taxation; Minister of Information and Public Relations; Minister of Information and Communication Technology	Vanlalthlana	8 December 2023	Incumbent	ZPM
Minister of Agriculture; Minister of Irrigation and Water Resources; Minister of Cooperation	P. C. Vanlalruata	8 December 2023	Incumbent	ZPM
Minister of Health and Family Welfare; Minister of Social Welfare and Tribal Affairs; Minister of Women and Child Development; Tourism	Lalrinpuii	8 December 2023	Incumbent	ZPM

=== Ministers of State (Independent Charge) ===
Portfolio	Minister	Took office	Left office	Party
Minister of State (Independent Charge) for Power and Electricity; Minister of State (Independent Charge) for Commerce and IndustriesMinister of State (Independent Charge) for Printing and Stationery	F. Rodingliana	8 December 2023	Incumbent	ZPM
Minister of State (Independent Charge) for Food, Civil Supplies and Consumer Affairs; Minister of State (Independent Charge) for Land Revenue and Settlement	B. Lalchhanzova	8 December 2023	Incumbent	ZPM
Minister of State (Independent Charge) for Rural Development; Minister of State (Independent Charge) for Horticulture; Minister of State (Independent Charge) for Public Health Engineering	Lalnilawma	8 December 2023	Incumbent	ZPM
Minister of State (Independent Charge) for Labour, Employment, Skill Development and Entrepreneurship; Minister of State (Independent Charge) for Sports and Youth Services; Minister of State (Independent Charge) for Excise and Narcotics	Lalnghinglova Hmar	8 December 2023	Incumbent	ZPM

== See also ==
- Government of India
- List of chief secretaries of Mizoram
