= 1998 Mizoram Legislative Assembly election =

Legislative Assembly election in Mizoram, India

- 25 November 1998

All 40 seats in the Mizoram Legislative Assembly 21 seats needed for a majority
- Registered: 445,366
- Turnout: 76.32%
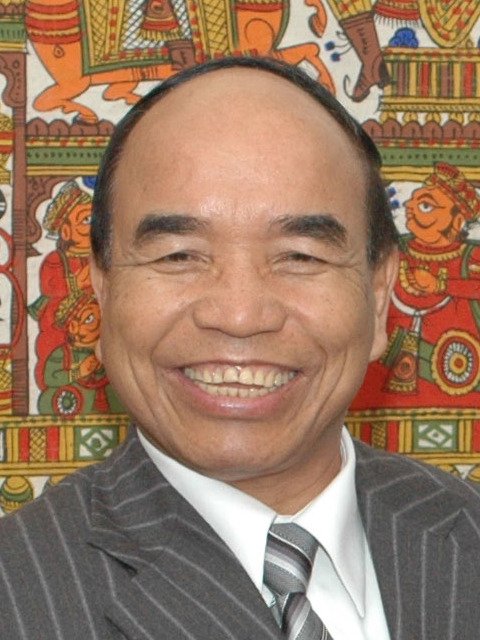

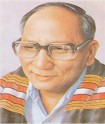

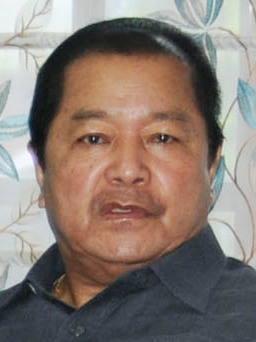
	Majority party	Minority party	Third party
Leader	Zoramthanga	T. Sailo	Lal Thanhawla
Party	MNF	MPC	INC
Leader's seat	Champhai	Mamit	Serchhip
Seats before	14	0	16
Seats won	21	12	6
Seat change	▲7	▲12	▼10
Popular vote	24.99%	20.44%	29.77%
CM before election
Lal Thanhawla
INC
Elected CM
Zoramthanga
MNF

Elections to the Mizoram Legislative Assembly were held in November 1998 to elect members of the 40 constituencies in Mizoram, India. The Mizo National Front won the most seats and formed a coalition with Mizoram People's Conference, but the coalition did not last long as MNF had gained enough seats to form a government on their own. The leader of MNF, Zoramthanga was appointed as the Chief Minister of Mizoram. The Indian National Congress won the popular vote. Zoramthanga had become the leader of the Mizo National Front in 1990, after the death of its previous leader, Laldenga.

== Parties Contested ==
No.	Party	Flag	Symbol	Leader	Seats contested
1.	Indian National Congress			Lal Thanhawla	40
2.	Mizo National Front			Zoramthanga	28
3.	Mizoram People's Conference			T. Sailo	28
4.	Mizoram National Front (Nationalist)				24
5.	Lok Shakti			Ramakrishna Hegde	15
6.	Bharatiya Janata Party			L. K. Advani	12
7.	Samata Party			George Fernandes	10
8.	Janata Dal			Vishwanath Pratap Singh	10
9.	Rashtriya Janata Dal			Lalu Prasad Yadav	8
10.	Maraland Democratic Front			P. P. Thawla	2
11.	Independents			collective leadership	44

== Result ==
Party	Votes	%	Seats	+/–
Mizo National Front	84,444	24.99	21	▲7
Mizoram People's Conference	69,078	20.44	12	New
Indian National Congress	100,608	29.77	6	▼10
Bharatiya Janata Party	8,448	2.50	0	0
Janata Dal	947	0.28	0	New
Samata Party	940	0.28	0	New
Lok Shakti	774	0.23	0	New
Rashtriya Janata Dal	588	0.17	0	New
Maraland Democratic Front	7,721	2.28	0	New
Mizo National Front (Nationalist)	31,190	9.23	0	New
Independents	33,200	9.82	1	▼9
Total	337,938	100.00	40	0
Valid votes	337,938	99.44		
Invalid/blank votes	1,913	0.56		
Total votes	339,851	100.00		
Registered voters/turnout	445,366	76.31		
Source: ECI

== Elected members ==
#	Constituency	Reserved for (ST/None)	Candidate	Party
1	Tuipang	ST	K. T. Rokhaw	Indian National Congress
2	Saiha	ST	Zakhu Hlychho	Indian National Congress
3	Sangau	ST	H. Rammawi	Independent
4	Lawngtlai	ST	C. Thanghluna	Indian National Congress
5	Chawngte	ST	N. P. Chakma	Indian National Congress
6	Tlabung	ST	Nihar Kanti	Indian National Congress
7	Buarpui	ST	Lalrinzuala	Mizoram People's Conference
8	Lunglei South	None	J. Lawmzuala	Mizoram People's Conference
9	Lunglei North	ST	Dr. R. Lalthangliana	Mizo National Front
10	Tawipui	ST	H. Ropuia	Mizo National Front
11	Vanva	ST	C. Lalrinsanga	Mizo National Front
12	Hnahthial	ST	F. Lalthanzuala	Mizoram People's Conference
13	North Vanlaiphai	ST	R. Lalawia	Mizo National Front
14	Khawbung	ST	Zoramthanga	Mizo National Front
15	Champhai	ST	Zoramthanga	Mizo National Front
16	Khawhai	ST	K. L. Lianchia	Mizoram People's Conference
17	Saitual	ST	R. Lalzirliana	Indian National Congress
18	Khawzawl	ST	Aichhinga	Mizo National Front
19	Ngopa	ST	P. B. Rosanga	Mizoram People's Conference
20	Suangpuilawn	ST	H. Laltanpuia	Mizoram People's Conference
21	Ratu	ST	Lalthankunga	Mizo National Front
22	Kawnpui	ST	Sanghmingthanga Pautu	Mizo National Front
23	Kolasib	ST	Rualchhina	Mizo National Front
24	Bilkhawthlir	ST	Lalchamliana	Mizo National Front
25	Lokicherra	ST	Tawnluia	Mizo National Front
26	Kawrthah	ST	K. Sangthuama	Mizo National Front
27	Mamit	ST	T. Sailo	Mizoram People's Conference
28	Phuldungsei	ST	J. Lalthangliana	Mizoram People's Conference
29	Sateek	ST	B. Lalthlengliana	Mizo National Front
30	Serchhip	ST	K. Thangzuala	Mizo National Front
31	Lungpho	ST	Vanlalhlana	Mizoram People's Conference
32	Tlungvel	ST	L. N. Tluanga	Mizoram People's Conference
33	Aizawl North 1	ST	Dr. Lalzama	Mizo National Front
34	Aizawl North 2	ST	F. Malsawma	Mizo National Front
35	Aizawl East 1	ST	Lalhmingthanga	Mizoram People's Conference
36	Aizawl East 2	ST	H. Vanlalauva	Mizo National Front
37	Aizawl West 1	ST	Col. Lalchungnunga Sailo	Mizoram People's Conference
38	Aizawl West 1	ST	Lalrinchhana	Mizo National Front
39	Aizawl South 1	ST	R. Tlanghmingthanga	Mizo National Front
40	Aizawl South 2	ST	C. Sangzuala	Mizo National Front

== See also ==
- List of constituencies of the Mizoram Legislative Assembly
- 1998 elections in India
