= 2003 Mizoram Legislative Assembly election =

Legislative Assembly election in Mizoram, India

- 20 November 2003

All 40 seats in the Mizoram Legislative Assembly 21 seats needed for a majority
- Registered: 532,028
- Turnout: 78.65%
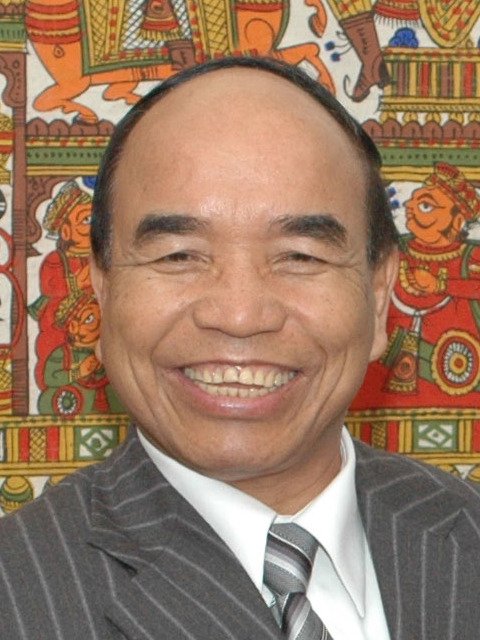

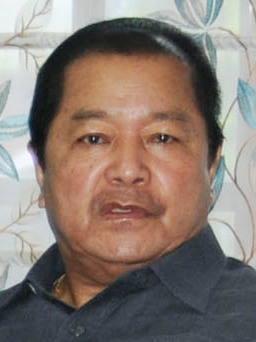

	Majority party	Minority party	Third party
Leader	Zoramthanga	Lal Thanhawla
Party	MNF	INC	MPC
Leader's seat	Champhai	Serchhip
Seats before	21	6	12
Seats won	21	12	3
Seat change	Steady	▲6	▼9
Popular vote	31.69%	30.06%	16.16%
CM before election
Zoramthanga
MNF
Elected CM
Zoramthanga
MNF

Elections to the Mizoram Legislative Assembly were held in November 2003 to elect members of the 40 constituencies in Mizoram, India. The Mizo National Front won the most seats and its leader, Zoramthanga was appointed as the Chief Minister of Mizoram for his second term.

== Parties Contested ==
No.	Party	Flag	Symbol	Leader	Seats contested
1.	Indian National Congress			Lal Thanhawla	40
2.	Mizo National Front			Zoramthanga	39
3.	Mizoram People's Conference			T. Sailo	28
4.	Janata Dal (United)			Sharad Yadav	28
5.	Zoram Nationalist Party				27
6.	Bharatiya Janata Party			L. K. Advani	8
7.	Communist Party of India			Ardhendu Bhushan Bardhan	4
8.	Ephraim Union				3
9.	Maraland Democratic Front			P. P. Thawla	2
10.	Hmar People's Convention				1
11.	Independents			collective leadership	12

== Result ==
Party	Votes	%	Seats	+/–
Mizo National Front	132,507	31.69	21	0
Indian National Congress	125,690	30.06	12	▲6
Mizoram People's Conference	67,576	16.16	3	▼9
Zoram Nationalist Party	61,466	14.70	2	New
Maraland Democratic Front	8,146	1.95	1	▲1
Hmar People's Convention	2,195	0.52	1	New
Bharatiya Janata Party	7,823	1.87	0	0
Janata Dal (United)	1,864	0.45	0	New
Communist Party of India	124	0.03	0	New
Ephraim Union	123	0.03	0	New
Independents	10,599	2.53	0	▼1
Total	418,113	100.00	40	0
Valid votes	418,113	99.93		
Invalid/blank votes	307	0.07		
Total votes	418,420	100.00		
Registered voters/turnout	532,028	78.65		
Source: ECI

== Elected members ==
#	Constituency	Reserved for (ST/None)	Candidate	Party
1	Tuipang	ST	P. P. Thawla	Maraland Democratic Front
2	Saiha	ST	S. Hiato	Indian National Congress
3	Sangau	ST	H. Rammawi	Mizo National Front
4	Lawngtlai	ST	H. Vanlalthaliana	Mizo National Front
5	Chawngte	ST	Rashik Mohan Chakma	Mizo National Front
6	Tlabung	ST	Nihar Kanti	Indian National Congress
7	Buarpui	ST	Zodintluanga	Indian National Congress
8	Lunglei South	None	Lalhmingthanga	Mizoram People's Conference
9	Lunglei North	ST	Dr R. Lalthangliana	Mizo National Front
10	Tawipui	ST	Z. H. Ropuia	Mizo National Front
11	Vanva	ST	C. Lalrinsanga	Mizo National Front
12	Hnahthial	ST	F. Lalthanzuala	Mizoram People's Conference
13	North Vanlaiphai	ST	D. Thangliana	Mizo National Front
14	Khawbung	ST	K. Vanlalauva	Mizo National Front
15	Champhai	ST	Zoramthanga	Mizo National Front
16	Khawhai	ST	Lalrinliana Sailo	Indian National Congress
17	Saitual	ST	R. Lalzirliana	Indian National Congress
18	Khawzawl	ST	Andrew Lalherliana	Zoram Nationalist Party
19	Ngopa	ST	H. Rohluna	Indian National Congress
20	Suangpuilawn	ST	H. Lalsangzuala	Hmar People's Convention
21	Ratu	ST	Lalduhawma	Zoram Nationalist Party
22	Kawnpui	ST	Sailothanga Sailo	Mizoram People's Conference
23	Kolasib	ST	Zoramthanga	Mizo National Front
24	Bilkhawthlir	ST	Lalchamliana	Mizo National Front
25	Lokicherra	ST	Tawnluia	Mizo National Front
26	Kawrthah	ST	Saikapthianga	Indian National Congress
27	Mamit	ST	Lalthlengliana	Mizo National Front
28	Phuldungsei	ST	Liansuama	Indian National Congress
29	Sateek	ST	B. Lalthlengliana	Mizo National Front
30	Serchhip	ST	Lal Thanhawla	Indian National Congress
31	Lungpho	ST	K. Lianzuala	Indian National Congress
32	Tlungvel	ST	Sainghaka	Indian National Congress
33	Aizawl North 1	ST	Dr Lalzama	Mizo National Front
34	Aizawl North 2	ST	H. Liansailova	Indian National Congress
35	Aizawl East 1	ST	K. Sangthuama	Mizo National Front
36	Aizawl East 2	ST	H. Vanlalauva	Mizo National Front
37	Aizawl West 1	ST	Aichhinga	Mizo National Front
38	Aizawl West 2	ST	Lalrinchhana	Mizo National Front
39	Aizawl South 1	ST	R. Tlanghmingthanga	Mizo National Front
40	Aizawl South 2	ST	R. Khawpuithanga	Mizo National Front

== See also ==
- List of constituencies of the Mizoram Legislative Assembly
- 2003 elections in India
