= Lalduhoma ministry =

First cabinet headed by Zoram People' Movement

- 14th Ministry of Mizoram

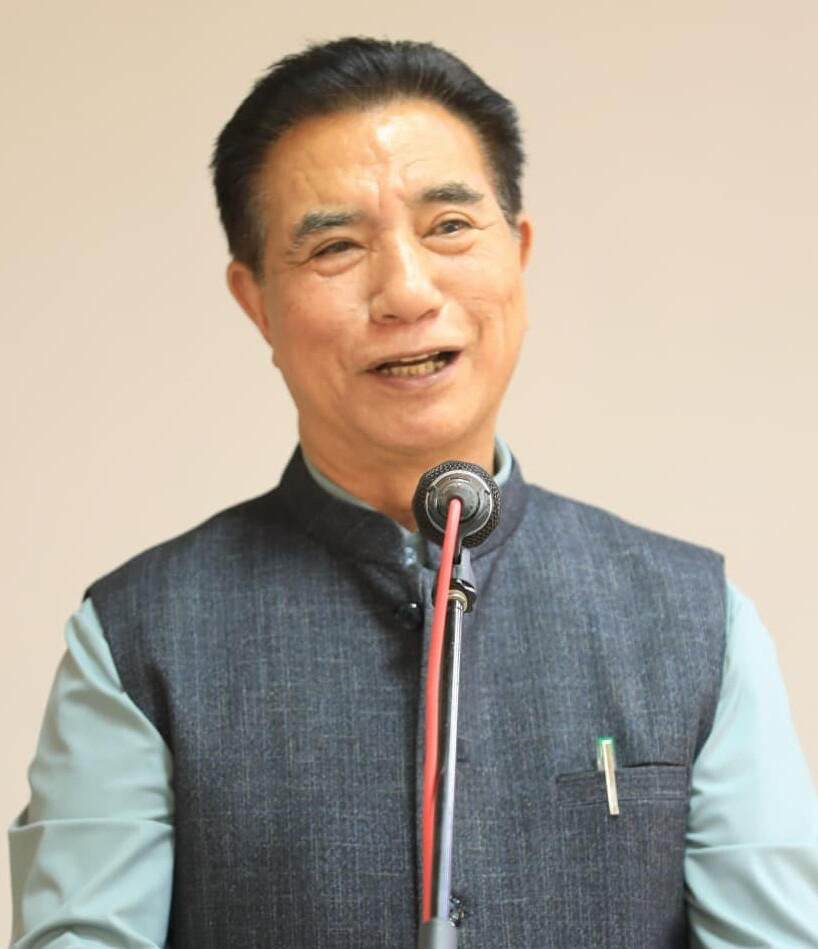
- Lalduhoma; Hon'ble Chief Minister of Mizoram
- Date formed: 8 December 2023

People and organisations
- Head of state: V. K. Singh Governor
- Head of government: Lalduhoma; Chief Minister
- No. of ministers: 12 (Including Chief Minister)
- Member parties: Zoram People's Movement
- Status in legislature: Majority
- Opposition party: Mizo National Front
- Opposition leader: Lalchhandama Ralte

History
- Election: 2023
- Outgoing election: 2023
- Legislature term: 5 years
- Predecessor: Third Zoramthanga ministry

The Lalduhoma ministry represents the formation of the cabinet of the Indian state Mizoram under the leadership of Lalduhoma, who is elected as the second Chief Minister of Mizoram. The Zoram People's Movement (ZPM), led by Lalduhoma, secured an absolute majority in the 2023 Mizoram Legislative Assembly election, winning 27 out of the 40 seats in the state assembly.

Lalduhoma assumed the office of Chief Minister of Mizoram in a swearing-in ceremony held at Rajbhawan, Mizoram on 8 December 2023. The oath of office and secrecy was administered to him and his eleven member cabinet by Governor Kambhampati Hari Babu.

== Council of Ministers ==
=== Cabinet Ministers ===
Portfolio	Minister	Took office	Left office	Party
Chief Minister and also in-charge of: Department of Finance; Department of Planning and Programme Implementation; Department of Vigilance; Department of General Administration; Department of Political and Cabinet; Department of Law and Judicial; And all other departments not specifically assigned to any minister.	Lalduhoma	8 December 2023	Incumbent	ZPM
Minister of Home; Minister of Urban Development and Poverty Alleviation; Minister of Personnel and Administrative Reforms; Minister of Disaster Management and Rehabilitation	K Sapdanga	8 December 2023	Incumbent	ZPM
Minister of Public Works; Minister of Transport; Minister of Parliamentary Affairs	Vanlalhlana	8 December 2023	Incumbent	ZPM
Minister of Local Administration; Minister of District Council and Minority Affairs; Minister of Art and Culture; Minister of Animal Husbandry and Veterinary	C. Lalsawivunga	8 December 2023	Incumbent	ZPM
Minister of Environment; Minister of Forests and Climate Change; Minister of Sericulture; Minister of Fisheries; Minister of Land Resources; Soil and Water Conservation	Lalthansanga	8 December 2023	Incumbent	ZPM
Minister of School Education; Minister of Higher and Technical Education; Minister of Taxation; Minister of Information and Public Relations; Minister of Information and Communication Technology	Vanlalthlana	8 December 2023	Incumbent	ZPM
Minister of Agriculture; Minister of Irrigation and Water Resources; Minister of Cooperation	P. C. Vanlalruata	8 December 2023	Incumbent	ZPM
Minister of Health and Family Welfare; Minister of Social Welfare and Tribal Affairs; Minister of Women and Child Development; Tourism	Lalrinpuii	8 December 2023	Incumbent	ZPM

=== Ministers of State (Independent Charge) ===
Portfolio	Minister	Took office	Left office	Party
Minister of State (Independent Charge) for Power and Electricity; Minister of State (Independent Charge) for Commerce and IndustriesMinister of State (Independent Charge) for Printing and Stationery	F. Rodingliana	8 December 2023	Incumbent	ZPM
Minister of State (Independent Charge) for Food, Civil Supplies and Consumer Affairs; Minister of State (Independent Charge) for Land Revenue and Settlement	B. Lalchhanzova	8 December 2023	Incumbent	ZPM
Minister of State (Independent Charge) for Rural Development; Minister of State (Independent Charge) for Horticulture; Minister of State (Independent Charge) for Public Health Engineering	Lalnilawma	8 December 2023	Incumbent	ZPM
Minister of State (Independent Charge) for Labour, Employment, Skill Development and Entrepreneurship; Minister of State (Independent Charge) for Sports and Youth Services; Minister of State (Independent Charge) for Excise and Narcotics	Lalnghinglova Hmar	8 December 2023	Incumbent	ZPM
