= 2008 Mizoram Legislative Assembly election =

Legislative Assembly election in Mizoram, India

- 2 December 2008

All 40 seats in the Mizoram Legislative Assembly 21 seats needed for a majority
- Registered: 611,618
- Turnout: 82.35%
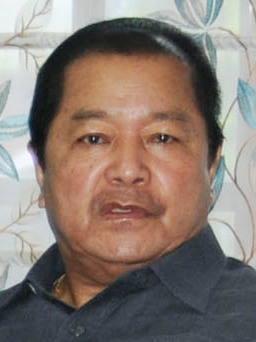

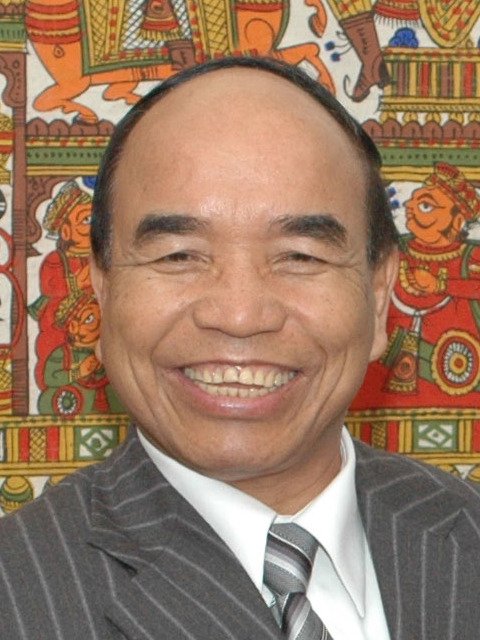
	Majority party	Minority party
Leader	Lal Thanhawla	Zoramthanga
Party	INC	MNF
Alliance	UPA	NDA
Leader's seat	Serchhip	Champhai North and Champhai South (both lost)
Seats before	12	21
Seats won	32	3
Seat change	▲20	▼18
Popular vote	38.89%	30.65%
- Results by constituency
CM before election
Zoramthanga
MNF
Elected CM
Pu Lalthanhawla
INC

Elections to the Mizoram Legislative Assembly were held on 2 December 2008, the counting was done on 8 December 2008. There were 40 seats for the assembly elections. The Indian National Congress swept the elections by winning 32 seats, Mizo National Front 3, others 5.

== Parties and alliances ==
=== MNF Alliance ===
MNF-led Alliance
Party	Flag	Symbol	Leader	Seats
Mizo National Front			Zoramthanga	39
Maraland Democratic Front			P. P. Thawla	1
Total				40

=== United Progressive Alliance ===
Indian National Congress
Party	Flag	Symbol	Leader	Seats
Indian National Congress			Lal Thanhawla	40

=== ZNP + MPC Alliance ===
ZNP + MPC
Party	Flag	Symbol	Leader	Seats
Zoram Nationalist Party			H. Lalrinmawia	17
Mizoram People's Conference				16
Total				33

=== Others ===
No.	Party	Flag	Symbol	Leader	Seats contested
1.	Lok Jan Shakti Party			Ram Vilas Paswan	38
2.	Bharatiya Janata Party			Rajnath Singh	9
3.	Nationalist Congress Party			Sharad Pawar	6
4.	Lok Bharati				5
5.	Janata Dal (United)			Sharad Yadav	2

== List of Candidates ==
List Of Candidates
Constituency		INC		MNF + MDF		ZNP + MPC	
No.	Name	Party	Candidate	Party	Candidate	Party	Candidate
1	Hachhek (ST)	INC	Lalrinmawia Ralte	MNF	H. Lalenvela	MPC	John Lalngilneia
2	Dampa (ST)	INC	Lalrobiaka	MNF	Lalrintluanga Sailo	ZNP	Lalhmingthanga Sailo
3	Mamit (ST)	INC	John Rotluangliana	MNF	Lalthlengliana	ZNP	Laltanpuia
4	Tuirial (ST)	INC	Hmingdailova Khiangte	MNF	Lalliankima	MPC	Sailothanga Sailo
5	Kolasib (ST)	INC	P. C. Zoram Sangliana	MNF	K. Lalrinliana	MPC	Lalrawna Sailo
6	Serlui (ST)	INC	K. Lalrinthanga	MNF	D. Thangliana	ZNP	H. L. Hluna
7	Tuivawl (ST)	INC	R. L. Pianmawia	MNF	Gogo Lalremtluanga	ZNP	Lalduhawma
8	Chalfilh (ST)	INC	Chawngtinthanga	MNF	J. C. Chhuanliana	MPC	Lalvenhima Hmar
9	Tawi (ST)	INC	R. Lalzirliana	MNF	Lalchhandama Ralte	MPC	Dr. Kenneth Chawngliana
10	Aizawl North - I (ST)	INC	R. Romawia	MNF	Dr. Lalzama	ZNP	Vanlalhruaia
11	Aizawl North - II (ST)	INC	H. Liansailova	MNF	Lalchamliana	MPC	Lalthanliana
12	Aizawl North - III (ST)	INC	Lal Thanzara	MNF	K. Sangthuama	MPC	Rosiamngheta
13	Aizawl East - I	INC	R. Lalrinawma	MNF	F. Malsawma	ZNP	Zarzoliana
14	Aizawl East - II (ST)	INC	Lalsawta	MNF	H. Vanlalauva	MPC	V. Laichhinga
15	Aizawl West - I (ST)	INC	Andrew Lalherliana	MNF	R. Tlanghmingthanga	ZNP	Lalduhawma
16	Aizawl West - II (ST)	INC	Zothankimi	MNF	Lalruatkima	MPC	Brig. T. Sailo
17	Aizawl West - III (ST)	INC	R. Selthuama	MNF	K. Vanlalauva	MPC	Col. Lalchungnunga Sailo
18	Aizawl South - I (ST)	INC	R. Vanlalvena	MNF	Vanlalzawma	ZNP	K. Liantlinga
19	Aizawl South - II (ST)	INC	Lt. Col. Zosangzuala	MNF	R. Khawpuithanga	ZNP	Denghmingthanga
20	Aizawl South - III (ST)	INC	K. S. Thanga	MNF	Tawnluia	Did not contest	
21	Lengteng (ST)	INC	H. Rohluna	MNF	L. Thangmawia	Did not contest	
22	Tuichang (ST)	INC	Lalrinliana Sailo	MNF	R. Lalawia	ZNP	Rualkhuma Hmar
23	Champhai North (ST)	INC	T. T. Zothansanga	MNF	Zoramthanga	MPC	Zosiama Pachuau
24	Champhai South (ST)	INC	J. H. Rothuama	MNF	Zoramthanga	ZNP	Lalhmingthangi Hmar
25	East Tuipui (ST)	INC	H. Thangchuanga	MNF	B. Lalthlengliana	ZNP	Dr. R. Rotluanga
26	Serchhip (ST)	INC	Lal Thanhawla	MNF	R. Lalhnuna	ZNP	C. Lalramzauva
27	Tuikum (ST)	INC	K. Lianzuala	MNF	T. C. Pachhunga	MPC	Vanlalhlana
28	Hrangturzo (ST)	INC	Ronald Sapa Tlau	MNF	Lalhlimpuii	MPC	Lalthansanga
29	South Tuipui (ST)	INC	Lalthanhawla	MNF	F. Lalthanzuala	ZNP	J. Lalchhuana
30	Lunglei North (ST)	INC	P. C. Lalthanliana	MNF	C. Lalrinsanga	MPC	Lalrinzuala
31	Lunglei East (ST)	INC	Joseph Lalhimpuia	MNF	Samson Zoramthanga	ZNP	Vanneia Hnamte
32	Lunglei West (ST)	INC	J. Lawmzuala	MNF	Dr. R. Lalthangliana	MPC	C. Zokhuma
33	Lunglei South (ST)	INC	S. Laldingliana	MNF	Z. H. Ropuia	ZNP	Saitlawma
34	Thorang (ST)	INC	Zodintluanga	MNF	Lalnuntluanga Sailo	Did not contest	
35	West Tuipui (ST)	INC	Nihar Kanti	MNF	Alak Bikash Chakma	Did not contest	
36	Tuichawng (ST)	INC	Nirupam Chakma	MNF	Rasik Mohan Chakma	Did not contest	
37	Lawngtlai West (ST)	INC	L. H. Chhuanawma	MNF	C. Ramhluna	Did not contest	
38	Lawngtlai East (ST)	INC	H. Zothangliana	MNF	H. Rammawi	Did not contest	
39	Saiha (ST)	INC	S. Hiato	MNF	H. C. Lalmalsawma Zasai	ZNP	F. Lalhmachhuana
40	Palak (ST)	INC	T. T. Vakhu	MDF	P. P. Thawla	MPC	N. Beikhai

== Result ==
Party	Votes	%	Seats	+/–
Indian National Congress	195,614	40.03	32	▲20
Mizo National Front	154,132	31.54	3	▼17
Mizoram People's Conference	38,684	7.92	2	▼1
Zoram Nationalist Party	51,403	10.52	2	0
Maraland Democratic Front	4,206	0.86	1	0
Others	5,988	1.23	0	0
Independents	38,684	7.92	0	0
Total	488,711	100.00	40	0
Valid votes	488,711	99.86		
Invalid/blank votes	709	0.14		
Total votes	489,420	100.00		
Registered voters/turnout	611,618	80.02		
Source: ECI

== Elected members ==
Constituency		Winner				Runner Up				Margin	%
#	Name	Candidate	Party	Votes	%	Candidate	Party	Votes	%	Margin	%
1	Hachhek	Lalrinmawia Ralte	INC	6,990	51.96	H. Lalenvela	MNF	4,373	32.51	2,617	19.45
2	Dampa	Lalrobiaka	INC	5,004	41.12	Lalrintluanga Sailo	MNF	4,324	35.53	680	5.59
3	Mamit	John Rotluangliana	INC	4,421	31.98	Lalthlengliana	MNF	2,274	16.45	2,147	15.53
4	Tuirial	Hmingdailova Khiangte	INC	4,717	39.58	Sailothanga Sailo	MPC	3,695	31.01	1,022	8.57
5	Kolasib	P. C. Zoram Sangliana	INC	5,510	40.92	K. Lalrinliana	MNF	4,462	33.14	1,048	7.78
6	Serlui	K. Lalrinthanga	INC	4,536	37.35	D. Thangliana	MNF	3,612	29.74	924	7.61
7	Tuivawl	R. L. Pianmawia	INC	4,276	36.69	Gogo Lalremtluanga	MNF	3,803	32.64	473	4.05
8	Chalfilh	Chawngtinthanga	INC	4,924	37.31	Lalvenhima Hmar	MPC	4,381	33.19	543	4.12
9	Tawi	R. Lalzirliana	INC	4,710	41.29	Lalchhandama Ralte	MNF	3,499	30.67	1,211	10.62
10	Aizawl North - I	R. Romawia	INC	4,948	36.89	Dr. Lalzama	MNF	3,911	29.16	1,037	7.73
11	Aizawl North-II	H. Liansailova	INC	5,207	36.52	Lalthanliana	MPC	4,941	34.65	266	1.87
12	Aizawl North-III	Lal Thanzara	INC	4,109	36.20	K. Sangthuama	MNF	3,603	31.74	506	4.46
13	Aizawl East-I	R. Lalrinawma	INC	5,084	37.61	F. Malsawma	MNF	3,995	29.55	1,089	8.06
14	Aizawl East-II	Lalsawta	INC	4,794	41.77	H. Vanlalauva	MNF	3,445	30.02	1,349	11.75
15	Aizawl West-I	Lalduhawma	ZNP	5,705	38.98	R. Tlanghmingthanga	MNF	4,963	33.91	742	5.07
16	Aizawl West-II	Brig. T. Sailo	MPC	4,654	36.92	Zothankimi	INC	4,156	32.97	498	3.95
17	Aizawl West-III	R. Selthuama	INC	5,233	40.82	Col. Lalchungnunga Sailo	MPC	4,120	32.13	1,113	8.69
18	Aizawl South-I	K. Liantlinga	ZNP	4,498	31.82	R. Vanlalvena	INC	4,470	31.62	28	0.20
19	Aizawl South-II	Lt. Col. Zosangzuala	INC	5,159	36.34	Denghmingthanga	ZNP	4,670	32.90	489	3.44
20	Aizawl South-III	K. S. Thanga	INC	5,284	37.74	Tawnluia	MNF	4,934	35.24	350	2.50
21	Lengteng	H. Rohluna	INC	4,776	38.92	L. Thangmawia	MNF	3,990	32.51	786	6.41
22	Tuichang	Lalrinliana Sailo	INC	4,428	39.02	Rualkhuma Hmar	ZNP	3,547	31.25	881	7.77
23	Champhai North	T. T. Zothansanga	INC	5,699	44.75	Zoramthanga	MNF	4,443	34.89	1,256	9.86
24	Champhai South	J. H. Rothuama	INC	5,345	44.96	Zoramthanga	MNF	4,287	36.06	1,058	8.90
25	East Tuipui	B. Lalthlengliana	MNF	3,787	35.58	H. Thangchuanga	INC	3,320	31.19	467	4.39
26	Serchhip	Lal Thanhawla	INC	4,744	39.68	C. Lalramzauva	ZNP	3,792	31.72	952	7.96
27	Tuikum	K. Lianzuala	INC	4,265	36.81	Vanlalhlana	MPC	3,863	33.34	402	3.47
28	Hrangturzo	Lalthansanga	MPC	4,431	37.80	Ronald Sapa Tlau	INC	3,979	33.95	452	3.85
29	South Tuipui	Lalthanhawla	INC	3,772	35.45	J. Lalchhuana	ZNP	3,676	34.55	96	0.90
30	Lunglei North	PC Lalthanliana	INC	4,914	40.55	C. Lalrinsanga	MNF	4,209	34.74	705	5.81
31	Lunglei East	Joseph Lalhimpuia	INC	3,898	39.80	Samson Zoramthanga	MNF	3,475	35.48	423	4.32
32	Lunglei West	Dr. R. Lalthangliana	MNF	4,156	40.84	J. Lawmzuala	INC	3,433	33.73	723	7.11
33	Lunglei South	S. Laldingliana	INC	5,276	44.54	Z. H. Ropuia	MNF	4,235	35.75	1,041	8.79
34	Thorang	Zodintluanga	INC	4,442	46.31	Lalnuntluanga Sailo	MNF	2,613	27.24	1,829	19.07
35	West Tuipui	Nihar Kanti	INC	5,052	56.73	Alak Bikash Chakma	MNF	3,512	39.43	1,540	17.30
36	Tuichawng	Nirupam Chakma	INC	10,421	56.44	Rasik Mohan Chakma	MNF	7,309	39.59	3,112	16.85
37	Lawngtlai West	C. Ramhluna	MNF	6,086	35.97	Lh. Chhuanawma	INC	5,286	31.24	800	4.73
38	Lawngtlai East	H. Zothangliana	INC	6,294	41.44	H. Rammawi	MNF	5,383	35.44	911	6.00
39	Saiha	S. Hiato	INC	4,772	36.94	H. C. Lalmalsawma Zasai	MNF	4,669	36.15	103	0.79
40	Palak	P. P. Thawla	MDF	4,206	33.37	T. T. Vakhu	INC	4,122	32.71	84	0.66
