= 1993 Mizoram Legislative Assembly election =

Legislative Assembly election in Mizoram, India

- 30 November 1993

All 40 seats in the Mizoram Legislative Assembly 21 seats needed for a majority
- Registered: 401,669
- Turnout: 80.75%
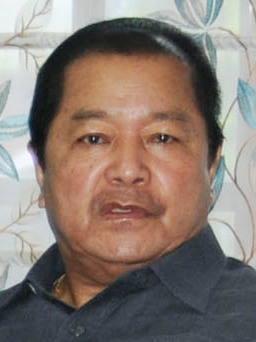

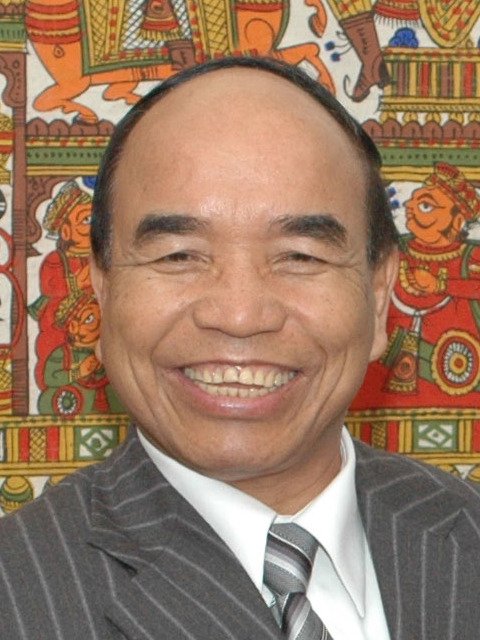
	Majority party	Minority party
Leader	Lal Thanhawla	Zoramthanga
Party	INC	MNF
Leader's seat	Serchhip	Champhai
Seats before	23	14
Seats won	16	14
Seat change	▼7	Steady
Popular vote	33.10%	40.41%
CM before election
Lal Thanhawla
INC
Elected CM
Lal Thanhawla
INC

Elections to the Mizoram Legislative Assembly were held in November 1993 to elect members of the 40 constituencies in Mizoram, India. The Indian National Congress won the most seats and formed a coalition with Mizo Janata Dal, whose MLAs contested as independent candidates. The leader of Indian National Congress in Mizoram, Lal Thanhawla was appointed as the Chief Minister of Mizoram for the third time. Mizo National Front won the popular vote.

The term of the assembly formed after the previous election in 1989, was supposed to end in 1994, but the election was held ahead of schedule, owing to the Gospel Centenary celebrations, the centenary of the introduction of the gospel to the Mizo people.

== Result ==
Party	Votes	%	Seats	+/–
Indian National Congress	106,320	33.10	16	▼7
Mizo National Front	129,813	40.41	14	0
Bharatiya Janata Party	10,004	3.11	0	New
Independents	75,097	23.38	10	▲8
Total	321,234	100.00	40	0
Valid votes	321,234	99.05		
Invalid/blank votes	3,089	0.95		
Total votes	324,323	100.00		
Registered voters/turnout	401,669	80.74		
Source: ECI

== Elected members ==
#	Constituency	Reserved for (ST/None)	Candidate	Party
1	Tuipang	ST	K. Rokhaw	Independent
2	Saiha	ST	Zakhu Hlychho	Mizo National Front
3	Sangau	ST	S. T. Rualyapa	Indian National Congress
4	Lawngtlai	ST	T Hranghluta	Mizo National Front
5	Chawngte	ST	Nirupam	Indian National Congress
6	Tlabung	ST	Harikristo Chakma	Indian National Congress
7	Buarpui	ST	P. Lalbiaka	Indian National Congress
8	Lunglei South	None	H. Lalruata	Mizo National Front
9	Lunglei North	ST	R. Lalthangliana	Mizo National Front
10	Tawipui	ST	F. Lalzuala	Mizo National Front
11	Vanva	ST	H. Thangkima	Independent
12	Hnahthial	ST	L. P. Thangzika	Mizo National Front
13	North Vanlaiphai	ST	C. L. Ruala	Indian National Congress
14	Khawbung	ST	Hrangthanga Colney	Independent
15	Champhai	ST	Zoramthanga	Mizo National Front
16	Khawhai	ST	Lalbiakzuala	Indian National Congress
17	Saitual	ST	C. Chawngkunga	Independent
18	Khawzawl	ST	C. Vulluaia	Independent
19	Ngopa	ST	H. Zathuama	Independent
20	Suangpuilawn	ST	F. Lawmkiam	Independent
21	Ratu	ST	Lalrinchhana	Mizo National Front
22	Kawnpui	ST	R. L. Valla	Indian National Congress
23	Kolasib	ST	Zosiama Pachuau	Independent
24	Bilkhawthlir	ST	Vaivenga	Indian National Congress
25	Lokicherra	ST	John Rotluangliana	Indian National Congress
26	Kawrthah	ST	Saikapthianga	Indian National Congress
27	Mamit	ST	Lalthuthanga	Indian National Congress
28	Phuldungsei	ST	Liansuama	Indian National Congress
29	Sateek	ST	B. Lalthengliana	Mizo National Front
30	Serchhip	ST	Lal Thanhawla	Indian National Congress
31	Lungpho	ST	P. C. Bawitluanga	Indian National Congress
32	Tlungvel	ST	P. C. Zoramsangliana	Indian National Congress
33	Aizawl North 1	ST	Lalhmingthanga	Independent
34	Aizawl North 2	ST	F. Malsawma	Mizo National Front
35	Aizawl East 1	ST	J. Lalsangzuala	Indian National Congress
36	Aizawl East 2	ST	F. Lalremsiama	Mizo National Front
37	Aizawl West 1	ST	Lalkhana	Mizo National Front
38	Aizawl West 2	ST	J. V. Hluna	Independent
39	Aizawl South 1	ST	R. Tlanghmingthanga	Mizo National Front
40	Aizawl South 2	ST	Lalsawta	Mizo National Front

== See also ==
- List of constituencies of the Mizoram Legislative Assembly
