= Aizawl North 2 Assembly constituency =

Constituency of the Mizoram legislative assembly in India

Coordinates: 23.738°N 92.728°E

Aizawl North 2
- Constituency No. 11 for the Mizoram Legislative Assembly
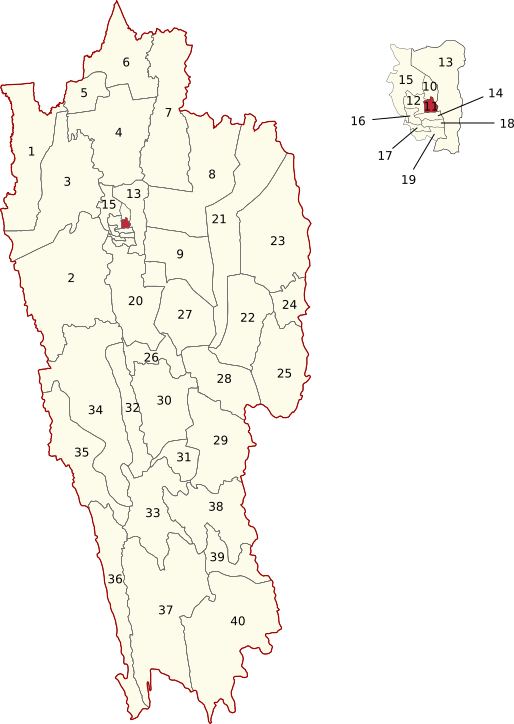

Constituency details
- Country: India
- Region: Northeast India
- State: Mizoram
- District: Aizawl
- Lok Sabha constituency: Mizoram
- Established: 1987
- Total electors: 20,524
- Reservation: ST

Member of Legislative Assembly
- 9th Mizoram Legislative Assembly
- Incumbent Vanlalthlana
- Party: ZPM
- Elected year: 2023

Aizawl North 2 is one of the 40 Legislative Assembly constituencies of Mizoram state in India.

It is part of Aizawl district and is reserved for candidates belonging to the Scheduled tribes.

== Members of the Legislative Assembly ==
Year	Member	Party
1987	Laldenga	Mizo National Front
1989	H. Thansanga	Indian National Congress
1993	F. Malsawma	Mizo National Front
1998	F. Malsawma	Mizo National Front
2003	H. Liansailova	Indian National Congress
2008	H. Liansailova	Indian National Congress
2013	Lalthanliana	Mizoram People's Conference
2018	Vanlalthlana	Zoram People's Movement
2023	Vanlalthlana	Zoram People's Movement

== Election results ==
=== 2023 ===
2023 Mizoram Legislative Assembly election: Aizawl North 2
Party	Candidate	Votes	%	±%
ZPM	Dr. Vanlalthlana			
MNF	Vanlalsawma			
INC	R. Lalrinmawia			
NOTA	None of the Above			
Majority				
Turnout				
		Swing		

=== 2018 ===
2018 Mizoram Legislative Assembly election: Aizawl North 2
Party	Candidate	Votes	%	±%
ZPM	Vanlalthlana	7,775	42.93	New
MNF	Laltlanzova Khiangte	5974	32.98	New
INC	H. Liansailova	4106	22.67	▼16.98
Independent	Lalhrilzeli Hlawndo	98	0.54	New
BJP	C. Lalnunziri	69	0.38	▲0.02
PRISM	Rochungnunga	39	0.22	New
NOTA	None of the Above	51	0.28	▼0.46
Majority		1801	9.97	
Turnout		18112	80.01	▼0.10
ZPM gain from MPC		Swing		

=== 2013 ===
2013 Mizoram Legislative Assembly election: Aizawl North 2
Party	Candidate	Votes	%	±%
MPC	Lalthanliana	6,875	41.53	▲6.88
INC	H. Liansailova	6564	39.65	▲3.13
ZNP	Lalchhanhima Pautu	2931	17.71	New
BJP	C. Lalnunziri	60	0.36	▼0.25
NOTA	None of the Above	123	0.74	New
Majority		311	1.89	
Turnout		16553	80.11	▼0.09
MPC gain from INC		Swing		

=== 2008 ===
2008 Mizoram Legislative Assembly election: Aizawl North 2
Party	Candidate	Votes	%	±%
INC	H. Liansailova	5,207	36.52	
MPC	Lalthanliana	4941	34.65	
MNF	Lalchamliana	3944	27.66	
BJP	C. Lalnunziri	87	0.61	
LJP	Gabriel Lalruathlua	80	0.56	
Majority		266	1.87	
Turnout		14259	80.2	
INC hold		Swing		
