= Federation Enclave =

Housing complex in Aizawl, Mizoram, India

- Interactive map of the Federation Enclave area

General information
- Status: Under construction
- Type: Housing complex
- Location: PMMR+GW9, Govt. Complex, Luangmual, Aizawl, Mizoram 796009, India.
- Coordinates: 23°43′57″N 92°41′27″E

Design and construction
- Architect: Prof. Christopher Charles Benninger
- Developer: Blue Mountain Construction Engineering & Services Pvt. Ltd.

Federation Enclave will be a housing complex located in Aizawl, Mizoram, in northeastern India. It will be built for government employees of the state and will be a collaborative project between the Federation of Mizoram Government Employees & Workers (FMGE&W) and the Government of Mizoram.

The then-Chief Minister of Mizoram, Zoramthanga, launched the construction on 15 July 2022. On the same day, booking for flat flats/apartments commenced with a 10% payment.

Upon completion, the housing complex will comprise 344 residences of varying sizes, offering two-bedroom, three-bedroom, and four-bedroom options. Modern amenities, including a fire safety network, 24-hour electric power backup, water recycling plant, vehicle parking, parks, and a clubhouse, will be integrated into the complex. The Japanese Rocco Housing method will also be utilised for earthquake safety.
