= Aizawl North 1 Assembly constituency =

Constituency of the Mizoram legislative assembly in India

Coordinates: 23.757°N 92.728°E

Aizawl North 1
- Constituency No. 10 for the Mizoram Legislative Assembly
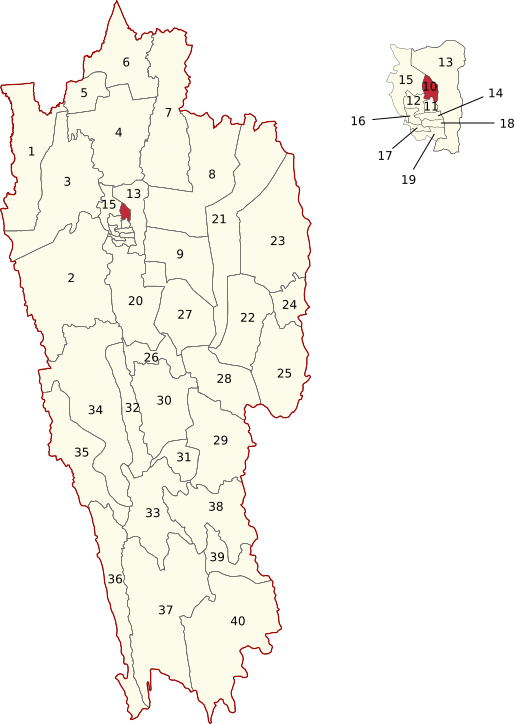

Constituency details
- Country: India
- Region: Northeast India
- State: Mizoram
- District: Aizawl
- Lok Sabha constituency: Mizoram
- Established: 1987
- Total electors: 20,216
- Reservation: ST

Member of Legislative Assembly
- 9th Mizoram Legislative Assembly
- Incumbent Vanlalhlana
- Party: Zoram People's Movement
- Elected year: 2023

Aizawl North 1 is one of the 40 Legislative Assembly constituencies of Mizoram state in India.

It is part of Aizawl district and is reserved for candidates belonging to the Scheduled tribes.

== Members of the Legislative Assembly ==
Year	Member	Party
1987	Lalhlimpuii	MNF
1989	Rosangliana	INC
1993	Lalhmingthanga	Independent
1998	Lalzama	MNF
2003	Lalzama	MNF
2008	R. Romawia	INC
2013	R. Romawia	INC
2018	Vanlalhlana	ZPM
2023	Vanlalhlana	ZPM

== Election results ==
=== 2023 ===
2023 Mizoram Legislative Assembly election: Aizawl North 1
Party	Candidate	Votes	%	±%
ZPM	Vanlalhlana			
MNF	R. Lalzirliana			
INC	Lalnunmawia Chuaungo			
NOTA	None of the Above			
Majority				
Turnout				
		Swing		

=== 2018 ===
2018 Mizoram Legislative Assembly election: Aizawl North 1
Party	Candidate	Votes	%	±%
ZPM	Vanlalhlana	7,094	40.09	▼21.26
MNF	Lalringliana	5929	33.51	New
INC	C. Lalhlimpuia	3595	20.32	▼16.76
Independent	Lalruatfeli Hlawndo	700	3.96	New
BJP	David Lalfakzuala	225	1.27	▲0.42
PRISM	Vanlalruata	77	0.44	New
NOTA	None of the Above	74	0.42	▼0.29
Majority		1165	6.61	
Turnout		17694	76.50	▼2.59
ZPM gain from INC		Swing		

=== 2013 ===
2013 Mizoram Legislative Assembly election: Aizawl North 1
Party	Candidate	Votes	%	±%
INC	R. Romawia	5,970	37.08	▲0.29
MPC	Vanlalhlana	5313	33.00	New
ZNP	C. Lalmalsawma	4564	28.35	▲4.81
BJP	David Lalfakzuala	137	0.85	New
NOTA	None of the Above	115	0.71	New
Majority		657	4.11	
Turnout		16099	79.09	▲1.89
INC hold		Swing		

=== 2008 ===
2008 Mizoram Legislative Assembly election: Aizawl North 1
Party	Candidate	Votes	%	±%
INC	R. Romawia	4,948	36.89	
MNF	Lalzama	3911	29.16	
ZNP	Vanlalhruaia	3158	23.54	
Independent	M. Lalmanzuala	1158	8.63	
NCP	Chawngroliana	155	1.16	
LJP	Lalsailova Sailo	84	0.63	
Majority		1037	7.73	
Turnout		13414	77.2	
INC win (new seat)				
