= Sesawng =

- Village
- Location within Mizoram Location within India
- Coordinates: 23.754°N 92.853°E
- Country: India
- State: Mizoram
- District: Aizawl
- Established: 1850
- Founder: Lallianvunga

Government
  - Body: Village Council I to III

Population (2025)
  - Total: 5,022
- Time zone: UTC+5:30 (IST)
- Postal code: 796017
- Vehicle registration: MZ
- Website: mizoram.nic.in

Sesawng is a village in Aizawl district in the Indian state of Mizoram.

== Demographics ==
As of the 2011 India census, Sesawng had a population of 2,722 spread over 562 households.
