= Aizawl South 1 Assembly constituency =

Constituency of the Mizoram legislative assembly in India

Coordinates: 23.724°N 92.721°E

Aizawl South 1
- Constituency No. 18 for the Mizoram Legislative Assembly
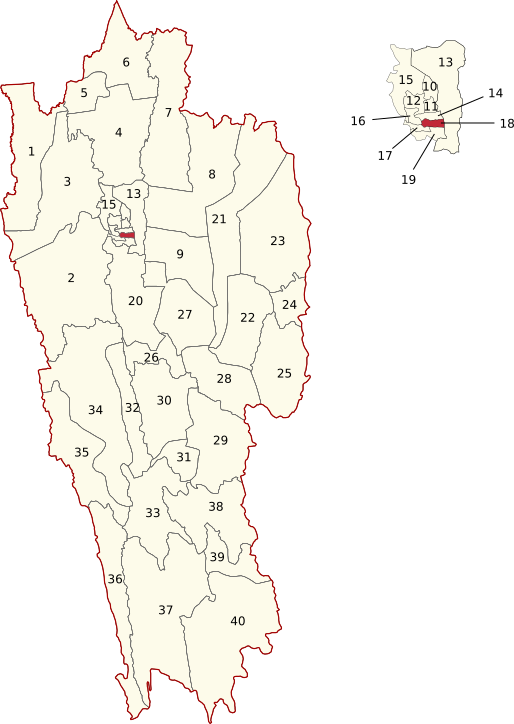

Constituency details
- Country: India
- Region: Northeast India
- State: Mizoram
- District: Aizawl
- Lok Sabha constituency: Mizoram
- Established: 1987
- Total electors: 23,066
- Reservation: ST

Member of Legislative Assembly
- 9th Mizoram Legislative Assembly
- Incumbent C. Lalsawivunga
- Party: ZPM
- Elected year: 2023

Aizawl South 1 Assembly constituency is one of the 40 Legislative Assembly constituencies of Mizoram state in India.

It is part of Aizawl district and is reserved for candidates belonging to the Scheduled tribes. As of 2023, it is represented by C Lalsawivunga of the Zoram People's Movement party.

== Members of the Legislative Assembly ==
| Year | Con. No. | Res. | Member | Party |
|---|---|---|---|---|
| 1987 | 39 | ST | R. Tlanghmingthanga | Independent |
| 1989 | 39 | ST | R. Tlagghmingthanga | Mizo National Front |
| 1993 | 39 | ST | R. Tlanghmingthanga | Mizo National Front |
| 1998 | 39 | ST | R. Tlanghmingthanga | Mizo National Front |
| 2003 | 39 | ST | R. Tlanghmingthanga | Mizo National Front |
| 2008 | 18 | ST | K. Liantlinga | Zoram Nationalist Party |
| 2013 | 18 | ST | R. Vanlalvena | Indian National Congress |
| 2018 | 18 | ST | C. Lalsawivunga | Independent |
| 2023 | 18 | ST | C. Lalsawivunga | Zoram People's Movement |

== Election results ==
=== 1987 ===
1987 Mizoram Legislative Assembly election : Aizawl South - I
| Party | Candidate | Votes | % | ±% |
|---|---|---|---|---|
| Independent | R. Tlanghmingthanga | 3,119 | 47.25 | |
| INC | Sainghaka | 1,791 | 27.13 | |
| MPC | Vanlalhlana | 1,313 | 19.89 | |
| Independent | B. Zodinpuii | 378 | 5.73 | |
| Margin of victory | | 1,328 | 20.12 | |
| Total valid votes | | 6,601 | | |
| Rejected ballots | | 54 | 0.81 | |
| Turnout | | 6,655 | 66.48 | |
| Registered electors | | 10,011 | | |
| Independent win (new seat) | | | | |

=== 1989 ===
1989 Mizoram Legislative Assembly election : Aizawl South - I
| Party | Candidate | Votes | % | ±% |
|---|---|---|---|---|
| MNF | R. Tlagghmingthanga | 2,495 | 36.66 | |
| INC | V. L. Tluanga | 2,442 | 35.88 | |
| MPC | Zairemthanga | 1,578 | 23.19 | |
| Independent | B. Lalmawia | 291 | 4.28 | |
| Margin of victory | | 53 | 0.78 | |
| Total valid votes | | 6,806 | | |
| Rejected ballots | | 68 | 0.99 | |
| Turnout | | 6,874 | 78.74 | |
| Registered electors | | 8,730 | | |
| MNF gain from Independent | | Swing | | |

=== 1993 ===
1993 Mizoram Legislative Assembly election : Aizawl South - I
| Party | Candidate | Votes | % | ±% |
|---|---|---|---|---|
| MNF | R. Tlanghmingthanga | 5,228 | 52.81 | |
| INC | F. Lalthlamunana | 4,671 | 47.19 | |
| Margin of victory | | 557 | 5.63 | |
| Total valid votes | | 9,899 | | |
| Rejected ballots | | 57 | 0.57 | |
| Turnout | | 9,956 | 79.00 | |
| Registered electors | | 12,603 | | |
| MNF hold | | Swing | | |

=== 1998 ===
1998 Mizoram Legislative Assembly election : Aizawl South - I
| Party | Candidate | Votes | % | ±% |
|---|---|---|---|---|
| MNF | R. Tlanghmingthanga | 3,790 | 35.26 | |
| MPC | Dr. J. V. Hluna | 3,031 | 28.20 | |
| INC | Lalthlengliana | 2,193 | 20.40 | |
| Mizo National Front (Nationalist) | F. Lalnienga | 1,718 | 15.98 | |
| JD | Lalkhumi | 16 | 0.15 | |
| Margin of victory | | 759 | 7.06 | |
| Total valid votes | | 10,748 | | |
| Rejected ballots | | 33 | 0.31 | |
| Turnout | | 10,781 | 76.40 | |
| Registered electors | | 14,112 | | |
| MNF hold | | Swing | | |

=== 2003 ===
2003 Mizoram Legislative Assembly election : Aizawl South - I
| Party | Candidate | Votes | % | ±% |
|---|---|---|---|---|
| MNF | R. Tlanghmingthanga | 5,312 | 37.24 | |
| ZNP | K. Liantlinga | 4,774 | 33.47 | |
| INC | Hiphei | 4,109 | 28.81 | |
| Ephraim Union | K. Zodingliani | 68 | 0.48 | |
| Margin of victory | | 538 | 3.77 | |
| Total valid votes | | 14,263 | | |
| Rejected ballots | | 35 | 0.24 | |
| Turnout | | 14,298 | 75.98 | |
| Registered electors | | 18,817 | | |
| MNF hold | | Swing | | |

=== 2008 ===
2008 Mizoram Legislative Assembly election : Aizawl South-I
| Party | Candidate | Votes | % | ±% |
|---|---|---|---|---|
| ZNP | K. Liantlinga | 4,498 | 31.82 | |
| INC | R. Vanlalvena | 4,470 | 31.62 | |
| MNF | Vanlalzawma | 3,998 | 28.28 | |
| Independent | A. Lalvunga | 1,043 | 7.38 | |
| LJP | Z. D. Lalhriata | 67 | 0.47 | |
| NCP | H. Hauliana | 60 | 0.42 | |
| Margin of victory | | 28 | 0.20 | |
| Total valid votes | | 14,136 | | |
| Rejected ballots | | 47 | | |
| Turnout | | 14,183 | 80.6 | |
| Registered electors | | 17,536 | | |
| ZNP gain from MNF | | Swing | | |

=== 2013 ===
2013 Mizoram Legislative Assembly election : Aizawl South I
| Party | Candidate | Votes | % | ±% |
|---|---|---|---|---|
| INC | R. Vanlalvena | 6,463 | 39.59 | |
| MNF | R. K. Lianzuala | 5,167 | 31.65 | |
| ZNP | K Liantlinga | 4,616 | 28.27 | |
| NOTA | None of the Above | 80 | 0.49 | |
| Margin of victory | | 1,296 | 7.98 | |
| Total valid votes | | 16,326 | | |
| Rejected ballots | | 36 | | |
| Turnout | | 16,362 | 81.30 | |
| Registered electors | | 20,082 | | |
| INC gain from ZNP | | Swing | | |

=== 2018 ===
2018 Mizoram Legislative Assembly election : Aizawl South I
| Party | Candidate | Votes | % | ±% |
|---|---|---|---|---|
| Independent | C. Lalsawivunga | 6,808 | 39.59 | |
| MNF | K. Liantlinga | 5,759 | 33.49 | |
| INC | R. Vanlalvena | 4,208 | 24.47 | |
| BJP | Dr Zonuntluanga | 177 | 1.03 | |
| Peoples Representation for Identity and Status of Mizoram (PRISM) Party | HK Liansawta | 111 | 0.65 | |
| Independent | Lalthlamuani | 69 | 0.40 | |
| NOTA | None of the Above | 64 | 0.37 | |
| Margin of victory | | 1,049 | 6.12 | |
| Total valid votes | | 17,196 | | |
| Rejected ballots | | 13 | | |
| Turnout | | 17,209 | 79.44 | |
| Registered electors | | 21,664 | | |
| Independent gain from INC | | Swing | | |

=== 2023 ===
2023 Mizoram Legislative Assembly election : Aizawl South-I
| Party | Candidate | Votes | % | ±% |
|---|---|---|---|---|
| ZPM | C. Lalsawivunga | 9,124 | 50.07 | |
| MNF | K. Vanlalvena | 5,499 | 30.18 | |
| INC | Vanlalawmpuii Chawngthu | 3,124 | 17.14 | |
| BJP | F.lalremsangi | 234 | 1.28 | |
| AAP | Lalngaihawma Pachuau | 103 | 0.57 | |
| Independent | Zosangliana | 84 | 0.46 | |
| NOTA | None of the Above | 54 | 0.3 | |
| Margin of victory | | 3,625 | 19.87 | |
| Total valid votes | | 18,222 | | |
| Rejected ballots | | 20 | | |
| Turnout | | 18,242 | 79.09 | |
| Registered electors | | 23,066 | | |
| gain from Independent | | Swing | | |

== See also ==
- List of constituencies of the Mizoram Legislative Assembly
