= K. Sapdanga =

Indian politician

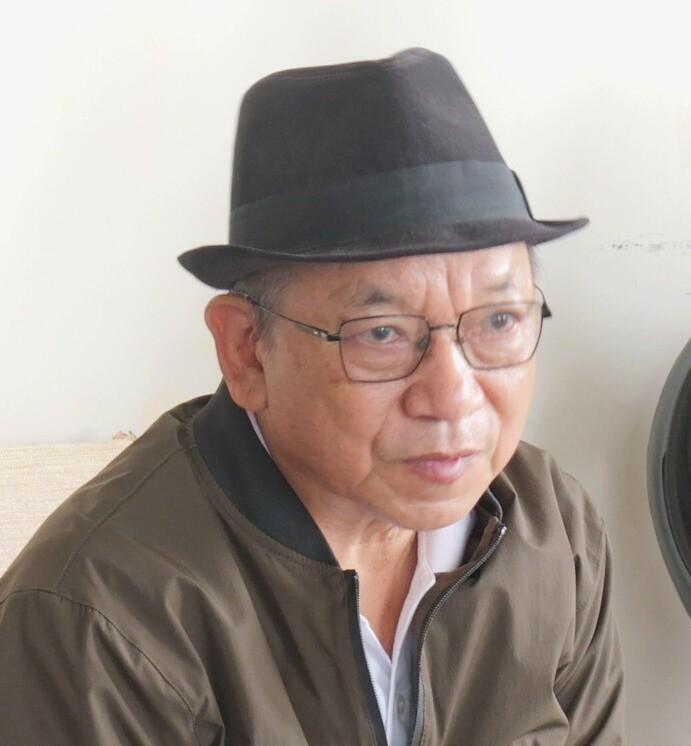
- Sapdanga in 2025

Minister of Home Affairs of Mizoram
- Incumbent
- Assumed office 8 December 2023
- Governor: Kambhampati Hari Babu; V. K. Singh
- Chief Minister: Lalduhoma
- Preceded by: Lalchamliana

Minister of Personnel and Administrative Reforms of Mizoram
- Incumbent
- Assumed office 8 December 2023
- Governor: Kambhampati Hari Babu; V. K. Singh
- Chief Minister: Lalduhoma
- Preceded by: Tawnluia

Minister of Disaster Management and Rehabilitation of Mizoram
- Incumbent
- Assumed office 8 December 2023
- Governor: Kambhampati Hari Babu; V. K. Singh
- Chief Minister: Lalduhoma
- Preceded by: Lalchamliana

Minister of Urban Development and Poverty Alleviation of Mizoram
- Incumbent
- Assumed office 8 December 2023
- Governor: Kambhampati Hari Babu; V. K. Singh
- Chief Minister: Lalduhoma
- Preceded by: Tawnluia

Member of the Mizoram Legislative Assembly
- Incumbent
- Assumed office December 2023
- Preceded by: C Lalmuanpuia
- Constituency: Aizawl North 3

Personal details
- Born: 15 November 1958 (age 67)
- Party: Zoram People's Movement (since 2017)
- Parent: Chalthuama (father)
- Education: BA
- Alma mater: North-Eastern Hill University

K. Sapdanga (born 1958) is an Indian politician and a journalist who serves as a Member of the Mizoram Legislative Assembly following his election in December 2023 from the Aizawl North 3 Assembly constituency. He is a Cabinet Minister under the Zoram People's Movement government led by Chief Minister Lalduhoma, with the following portfolios allocated to Sapdanga - Home Department, Urban Development & Poverty Alleviation Department, Department of Personnel & Administrative Reforms and Disaster Management & Rehabilitation Department. He is the working president of the Zoram People's Movement.

== Career ==
K. Sapdanga is also the Editor and Publisher of Vanglaini, the newspaper with the largest circulation in Mizoram. He is also the co-founder of Zonet cable TV.
