= Aizawl East 1 Assembly constituency =

Constituency of the Mizoram legislative assembly in India

Coordinates: 23.844°N 92.786°E

Aizawl East 1
- Constituency No. 12 for the Mizoram Legislative Assembly
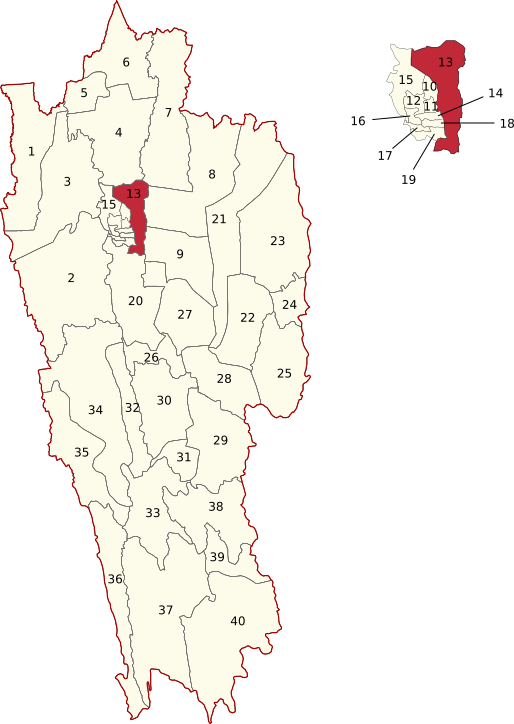

Constituency details
- Country: India
- Region: Northeast India
- State: Mizoram
- District: Aizawl
- Lok Sabha constituency: Mizoram
- Established: 1987
- Total electors: 29,044
- Reservation: None

Member of Legislative Assembly
- 9th Mizoram Legislative Assembly
- Incumbent Lalthansanga
- Party: Zoram People's Movement
- Elected year: 2023

Aizawl East 1 is one of the 40 Legislative Assembly constituencies of Mizoram state in India.

It is part of the Aizawl district.

== Members of the Legislative Assembly ==
Year	Member	Party
1987	Saingura Sailo	MNF
1989	J. Lalsangzuala	INC
1993	J. Lalsangzuala	INC
1998	Lalhmingthanga	MPC
2003	K. Sangthuama	MNF
2008	R. Lalrinawma	INC
2013	R. Lalrinawma	INC
2018	Zoramthanga	MNF
2023	Lalthansanga	ZPM

== Election results ==
=== 2023 ===
2023 Mizoram Legislative Assembly election: Aizawl East 1
Party	Candidate	Votes	%	±%
ZPM	Lalthansanga	10,727	47.88	New
MNF	Zoramthanga	8,626	38.5	▼4.25
INC	Lalsanglura Ralte	2,520	11.25	▼13.14
Independent	Lalruatfeli Hlawndo	441	1.97	New
NOTA	None of the Above	90	0.4	▲0.08
Majority		2,101	9.38	▼3.41
Turnout		22,404		
ZPM gain from MNF		Swing		

=== 2018 ===
2018 Mizoram Legislative Assembly election: Aizawl East 1
Party	Candidate	Votes	%	±%
MNF	Zoramthanga	8,358	42.75	New
ZPM	K. Sapdanga	5854	29.94	▼31.24
INC	K. Vanlalrawna	4768	24.39	▼13.33
BJP	Laldinliana Sailo	260	1.33	▲0.74
Independent	Zosangliana	146	0.75	New
NCP	K. Lalrinpuii	102	0.52	New
NOTA	None of the Above	63	0.32	▼0.20
Majority		2504	12.85	
Turnout		19551	80.30	▲0.89
Registered electors		24,348		
MNF gain from INC		Swing		

=== 2013 ===
2013 Mizoram Legislative Assembly election: Aizawl East 1
Party	Candidate	Votes	%	±%
INC	R. Lalrinawma	6,221	37.72	▲0.11
MPC	Lalhmangaiha Sailo	5799	35.16	New
ZNP	Zarzoliana	4291	26.02	▼1.08
BJP	Thangchungnunga	98	0.59	New
NOTA	None of the Above	85	0.52	New
Majority		422	2.57	
Turnout		16494	81.12	▲0.03
INC hold		Swing		

=== 2008 ===
2008 Mizoram Legislative Assembly election: Aizawl East 1
Party	Candidate	Votes	%	±%
INC	R. Lalrinawma	5,084	37.61	
MNF	F. Malsawma	3995	29.55	
ZNP	Zarzoliana	3664	27.10	
Independent	Lalthazuala Rawite	337	2.49	
LJP	J. F. Rothangliana	269	1.99	
Independent	Rualpawla	97	0.72	
NCP	Suakdailova	73	0.54	
Majority		1089	8.06	
Turnout		13519	79.7	
INC win (new seat)				
