= Lalthansanga =

Indian politician

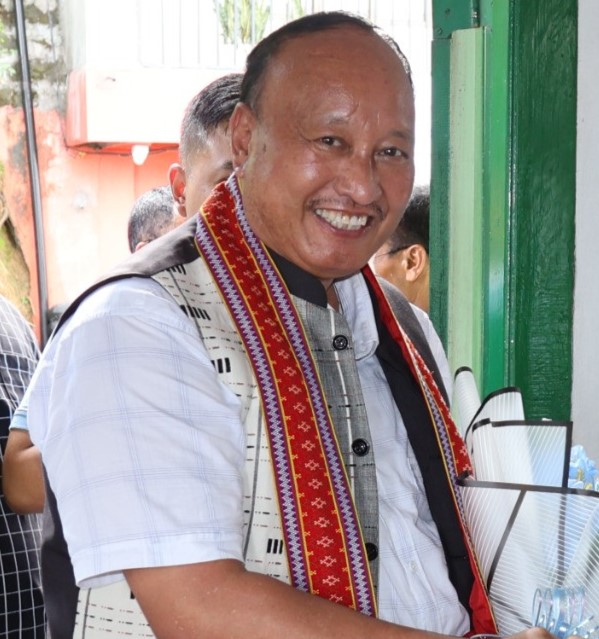
- Lalthansanga in 2025

Minister of Sericulture of Mizoram
- Incumbent
- Assumed office 8 December 2023
- Governor: Kambhampati Hari Babu; V. K. Singh
- Chief Minister: Lalduhoma
- Preceded by: Lalrinawma

Minister of Fisheries of Mizoram
- Incumbent
- Assumed office 8 December 2023
- Governor: Kambhampati Hari Babu; V. K. Singh
- Chief Minister: Lalduhoma
- Preceded by: K Lalrinliana

Minister of Environment, Forests and Climate Change of Mizoram
- Incumbent
- Assumed office 8 December 2023
- Governor: Kambhampati Hari Babu; V. K. Singh
- Chief Minister: Lalduhoma
- Preceded by: T J Lalnuntluanga

Minister of Land Resources, Soil and Water Conservation of Mizoram
- Incumbent
- Assumed office 8 December 2023
- Governor: Kambhampati Hari Babu; V. K. Singh
- Chief Minister: Lalduhoma
- Preceded by: R Lalzirliana

Member of the Mizoram Legislative Assembly
- Incumbent
- Assumed office December 2023
- Preceded by: Zoramthanga
- Constituency: Aizawl East 1

Personal details
- Born: 9 January 1963 (age 63) Zarkawt, Aizawl
- Party: Zoram People's Movement (since 2017)
- Spouse: Malsawmtluangi
- Parent: Lianzama (father)
- Education: B.A (2nd year)
- Occupation: Farming

Lalthansanga is an Indian politician from Mizoram, who is currently the Cabinet Minister for Environment Forests & Climate Change, Sericulture, Fisheries, Land Resources, Soil & Water Conservation Departments for the Government of Mizoram.

He was elected to the Mizoram Legislative Assembly for the Aizawl East 1 Assembly constituency in the 2023 general election as a candidate for the Zoram People's Movement.

== Career ==
Lalthansanga was previously a member of the Mizoram People's Conference. He was the vice president of the MPC, but resigned from the party to join the Zoram People's Movement in 2019.
