= V. Malsawmtluanga =

Indian politician

Member of the Mizoram Legislative Assembly

V. Malsawmtluanga (born 1989) is an Indian politician from Mizoram. He is an MLA from the Lunglei North Assembly constituency, which is reserved for Scheduled Tribe community, in Lunglei district. He won the 2023 Mizoram Legislative Assembly election, representing the Zoram People's Movement.

== Early life and education ==
Malsawmtluanga is from Lunglei, Mizoram. He is the son of V. Lalrinmawia. His wife is a teacher. He completed his Master of Arts in physical education in 2016 at the Global Open University, Dimapur, Nagaland.

== Career ==
Malsawmtluanga won the Lunglei North Assembly constituency representing the Zoram People's Movement in the 2023 Mizoram Legislative Assembly election. He polled 7,369 votes and defeated his nearest rival, Vanlaltanpuia of the Mizo National Front, by a margin of 1,975 votes.
