= C. Lalsawivunga =

Indian politician

C.Lalsawivunga
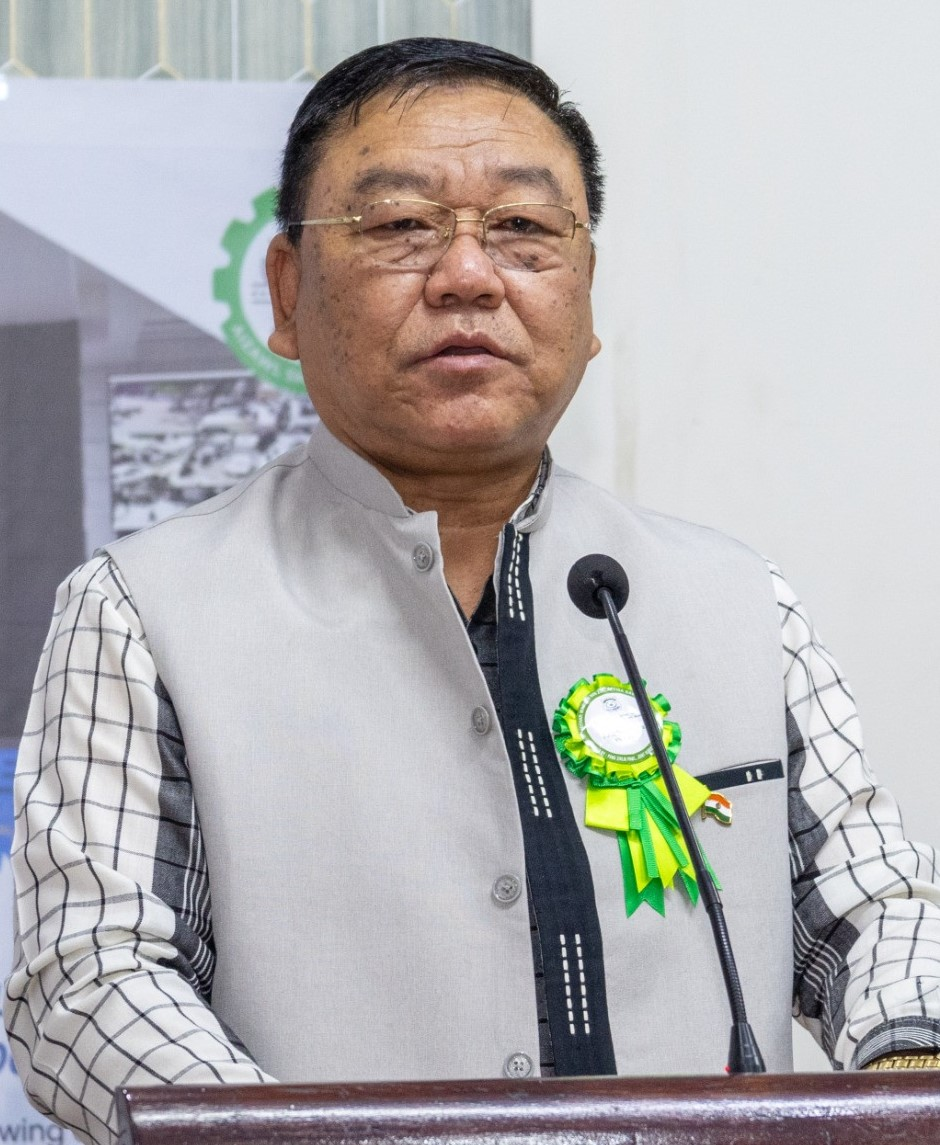
- C. Lalsawivunga in 2025

Minister of Art and Culture of Mizoram
- Incumbent
- Assumed office 8 December 2023
- Governor: Kambhampati Hari Babu; V. K. Singh
- Chief Minister: Lalduhoma
- Preceded by: R Lalzirliana

Minister of Local Administration of Mizoram
- Incumbent
- Assumed office 8 December 2023
- Governor: Kambhampati Hari Babu; V. K. Singh
- Chief Minister: Lalduhoma
- Preceded by: Zoramthanga

Minister of District Council and Minority Affairs of Mizoram
- Incumbent
- Assumed office 8 December 2023
- Governor: Kambhampati Hari Babu; V. K. Singh
- Chief Minister: Lalduhoma
- Preceded by: R Lalzirliana

Minister of Animal Husbandry and Veterinary of Mizoram
- Incumbent
- Assumed office 8 December 2023
- Governor: Kambhampati Hari Babu; V. K. Singh
- Chief Minister: Lalduhoma
- Preceded by: Lalrinawma

Member of the Mizoram Legislative Assembly
- Incumbent
- Assumed office November 2018
- Preceded by: R. Vanlalvena
- Constituency: Aizawl South 1

Personal details
- Born: 18 April 1962 (age 63)
- Party: Zoram People's Movement (since 2017)
- Spouse: Vanlalliani Sailo
- Children: 5
- Parent: C. Lalsailova (father)
- Education: BA
- Alma mater: North-Eastern Hill University

C.Lalsawivunga is an Indian politician from Mizoram, who is currently the Cabinet Minister for Local Administration, District Council & Minority Affairs, Art & Culture, Animal Husbandry & Veterinary Departments for the Government of Mizoram.

He was elected to the Mizoram Legislative Assembly for the Aizawl South 1 Assembly constituency in the 2023 general election as a candidate for the Zoram People's Movement.

== Education ==
C.Lalsawivunga completed his Bachelor's from North-Eastern Hill University in 1992.
