= Mizo Janata Dal =

Indian political party

Mizo Janata Dal, a political party in Mizoram, India. In spite of its name, MJD had no relation with the All India Janata Dal. MJD was led by Brig. T. Sailo. Colney Hrangthanga was the Vice President of MJD 1991–1992. MJD contested the 1993 state elections together with Indian National Congress. MJD won eight seats. With the support of the MJD legislators, INC was able to form a government in the state.

Sailo later revived his Mizo People's Conference.
