= H. Lalzirliana =

Indian politician

Member of the Mizoram Legislative Assembly

H. Lalzirliana (born 4 January 1970) is an Indian politician from Mizoram. He is an MLA from the Mamit Assembly constituency, which is reserved for Scheduled Tribe community, in Mamit district. He won the 2023 Mizoram Legislative Assembly election, representing the Mizo National Front.

== Early life and education ==
Lalzirliana is born in Mamit, Mizoram. He is the son of late. H. Thanzauva. He married C. Lalfamkimi and they have two daughters and a son. He completed his B.Tech. in 1996 at the North Eastern Regional Institute of Science & Technology.

== Career ==
Lalzirliana won the Mamit Assembly constituency representing the Mizo National Front in the 2023 Mizoram Legislative Assembly election. He polled 7,167 votes and defeated his nearest rival, K. Lalthanzama of the Indian National Congress, by a margin of 1,792 votes. He first became an MLA winning the 2018 Mizoram Legislative Assembly election, defeating John Rotluangliana of the Indian National Congress, by a margin of 407 votes.
