= Vanlalthlana =

Indian politician

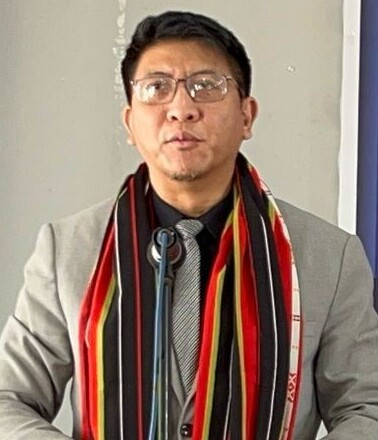
- Vanlalthlana in 2025

Minister of Taxation of Mizoram
- Incumbent
- Assumed office 8 December 2023
- Governor: V.K. Singh
- Chief Minister: Lalduhoma
- Preceded by: Lalchamliana

Minister of School Education of Mizoram
- Incumbent
- Assumed office 8 December 2023
- Governor: V. K. Singh
- Chief Minister: Lalduhoma
- Preceded by: Lalchhandama Ralte

Minister of Information and Public Relation of Mizoram
- Incumbent
- Assumed office 8 December 2023
- Governor: V. K. Singh
- Chief Minister: Lalduhoma
- Preceded by: Lalruatkima

Minister of Higher and Technical Education of Mizoram
- Incumbent
- Assumed office 8 December 2023
- Governor: V. K. Singh
- Chief Minister: Lalduhoma
- Preceded by: R. Lalthangliana

Minister of Information and Communication Technology of Mizoram
- Incumbent
- Assumed office 8 December 2023
- Governor: V. K. Singh
- Chief Minister: Lalduhoma
- Preceded by: Robert Romawia Royte

Member of the Mizoram Legislative Assembly
- Incumbent
- Assumed office December 2018
- Preceded by: Lalthanliana
- Constituency: Aizawl North 2

Personal details
- Born: 27 October 1978 (age 47)
- Party: Independent politician
- Other political affiliations: Zoram People's Movement
- Spouse: Evelyn Lalhmangaihi
- Children: 4
- Parent: Rev. C. Biakmawia (father)
- Education: Mizoram University

Vanlalthlana (born 27 October 1978) is an academic and politician from Mizoram, India. He is currently the Cabinet Minister for School Education, Higher & Technical Education, Taxation, Information & Public Relations and Information & Communication Technology. He was assistant professor of commerce at Pachhunga University College, Mizoram University. He is the founding member of the Zoram People's Movement, a regional political party in Mizoram. He was elected to the Mizoram Legislative Assembly from the Aizawl North 2 constituency in the 2018 general election and the 2023 general election.

== Family ==
Vanlalthlana is the son of Rev. C. Biakmawia, a church minister who had served as Moderator of the Mizoram Presbyterian Church Synod and Principal of Aizawl Theological College. With his wife, Evelyn Lalhmangaihi, and three daughters and one son, he resides at Ramhlun North, Aizawl, Mizoram.

== Education ==
Vanlalthlana studied commerce and obtained an M.Com. and a PhD from Mizoram University. He joined the faculty of commerce at Pachhunga University College in 2005. In 2020, the Bharatiya Chhatra Sansad (Indian Youth/Students Parliament) Foundation under the Maharashtra Institute of Technology awarded him the honour "Ideal Youth MLA."
