= Lalchamliana =

Indian politician

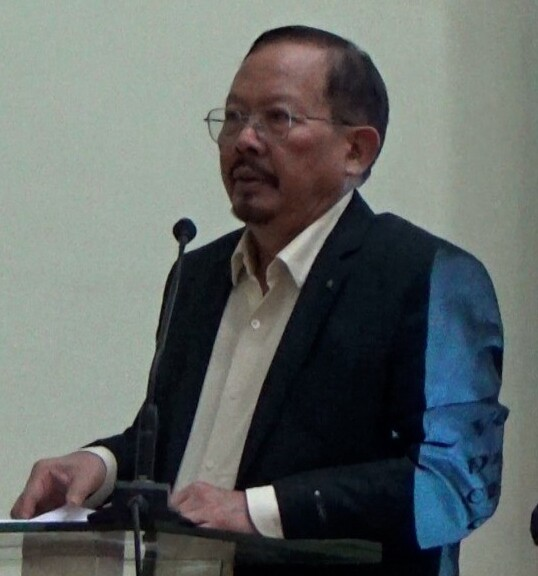
- Lalchamliana in 2022

Cabinet Minister Government of Mizoram
- In office 15 December 2018 – 3 December 2023
- Minister: Home, Taxation, Disaster Management & Rehabilitation
- Chief Minister: Zoramthanga

Personal details
- Born: 17 August 1949 (age 77)
- Party: Mizo National Front
- Children: 4
- Education: NEHU

Lalchamliana is a Mizo National Front politician from Mizoram. He was a cabinet minister in the Third Zoramthanga ministry.

== Career ==
He was a member of the Mizo National Front movement from 1966 to 1974, holding the rank of Lieutenant, and then joined Pachhunga University College from 1984 onward. He first ran for the MLA in 1989 under the Mizoram People's Conference party unsuccessfully and thereafter was elected on Mizo National Front in 1998, 2003 and 2018. He was the 11th Speaker of Mizoram Legislative Assembly in 2003. He retired from politics and did not seek re-election in the 2023 Mizoram Legislative Assembly election.

== Education ==
He completed his M.A. in political science from North-Eastern Hill University in 1981, winning a gold medal.

== Personal life ==
He married Nuchhungi, and they have two sons and two daughters.
