= Vanlalhlana =

Indian politician

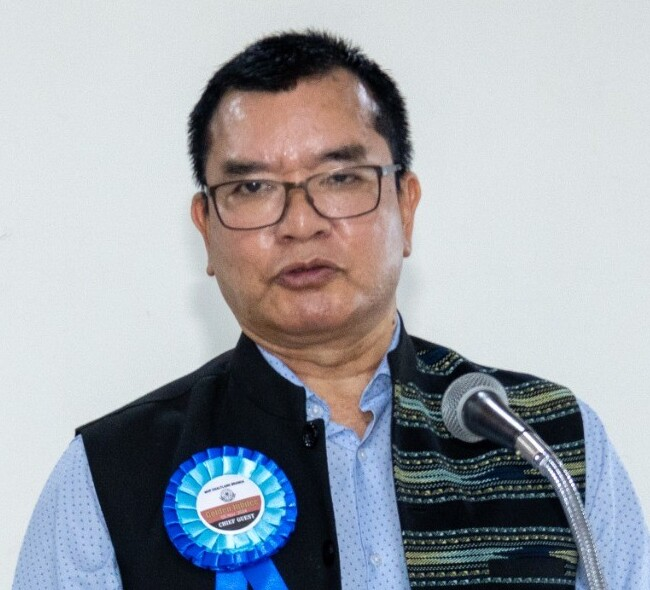
- Vanlalhlana in 2024

Minister of Transport of Mizoram
- Incumbent
- Assumed office 8 December 2023
- Governor: Kambhampati Hari Babu (formerly)
- Chief Minister: Lalduhoma
- Preceded by: T J Lalnuntluanga

Minister of Public Works of Mizoram
- Incumbent
- Assumed office 8 December 2023
- Governor: Kambhampati Hari Babu
- Chief Minister: Lalduhoma
- Preceded by: Zoramthanga

Minister of Parliamentary of Mizoram
- Incumbent
- Assumed office 8 December 2023
- Governor: Kambhampati Hari Babu
- Chief Minister: Lalduhoma
- Preceded by: T J Lalnuntluanga

Member of the Mizoram Legislative Assembly
- Incumbent
- Assumed office December 2023
- Preceded by: R. Romawia
- Constituency: Aizawl North 1

Personal details
- Born: 26 March 1959 (age 67)
- Party: Zoram People's Movement (since 2017)
- Spouse: Lalremmawii
- Children: 3
- Parent: Thanzama (father)
- Education: MA (Economics)
- Alma mater: North-Eastern Hill University

Vanlalhlana is an Indian politician from Mizoram, who is currently the Cabinet Minister for Public Works, Transport and Parliamentary Affairs Department for the Government of Mizoram.

He was elected to the Mizoram Legislative Assembly for the Aizawl North 1 Assembly constituency in the 2023 general election as a candidate for the Zoram People's Movement.

== Education ==
Vanlalhlana completed his Post Graduate in MA (Anthropology) from North-Eastern Hill University in 1984.
