= Aizawl district =

- District
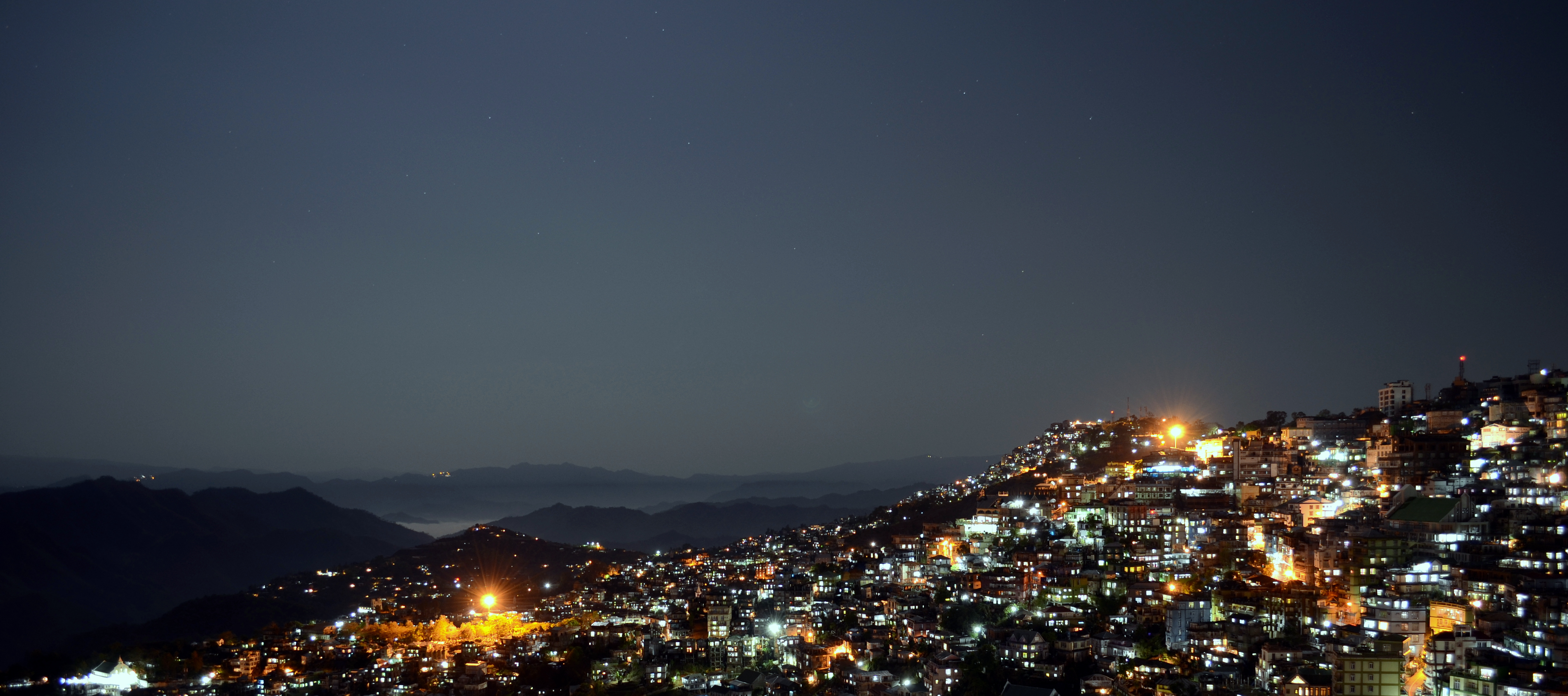
- Aizawl at Night
- Interactive map of Aizawl district
- Coordinates (Aizawl): 23°52′30″N 92°51′30″E
- Country: India
- State: Mizoram
- Headquarters: Aizawl

Government
  - District Collector: Er. Lalhriatpuia, IAS
  - Superintendent of Police: Zosangliana, IPS

Area
  - Total: 3,577 km^{2} (1,381 sq mi)

Population (2023)
  - Total: 1,023,678
  - Density: 286.2/km^{2} (741.2/sq mi)

Demographics
  - Literacy: 98.64%
  - Sex ratio: 1009
- Time zone: UTC+05:30 (IST)
- Website: aizawl.nic.in

Aizawl district is one of the eleven districts of Mizoram state in India. The district headquarters is Aizawl.

== Geography ==
Aizawl

Climate chart (precipitation, max. and min. temperature)
J	F	M	A	M	J	J	A	S	O	N	D
5.9 21 11	27 22 14	78 25 16	158 27 18	247 27 19	477 25 19	276 25 19	305 26 19	285 26 20	240 25 18	40 23 15	7 21 13
- █ Average max. and min. temperatures in °C
- █ Precipitation totals in mm
- Source: IMD
Imperial conversion
J	F	M	A	M	J	J	A	S	O	N	D
0.2 69 53	1 72 56	3.1 78 60	6.2 81 64	9.7 80 65	19 78 67	11 78 67	12 78 67	11 78 67	9.5 76 65	1.6 73 59	0.3 70 55
- █ Average max. and min. temperatures in °F
- █ Precipitation totals in inches

== Divisions ==
The district has 5 R.D. Blocks, Aibawk, Darlawn, Phullen, Thingsulthliah and Tlangnuam.

The district has 14 legislative assembly constituencies. These are Tuivawl, Chalfilh, Tawi, Aizawl North 1, Aizawl North 2, Aizawl North 3, Aizawl East 1, Aizawl East 2, Aizawl West 1, Aizawl West 2, Aizawl West 3, Aizawl South 1, Aizawl South 2 and Aizawl South 3.

== Demographics ==
Historical population
Year	Pop.	±% p.a.
1971	88,298	—
1981	148,607	+5.34%
1991	235,879	+4.73%
2001	325,676	+3.28%
2011	400,309	+2.08%

According to the 2011 census Aizawl district has a population of 400,309, roughly equal to the nation of Brunei. This gives it a ranking of 557th in India (out of a total of 640). The district has a population density of 113 inhabitants per square kilometre (290/sq mi). Its population growth rate over the decade 2001-2011 was 24.07%. Aizawl has a sex ratio of 1009 females for every 1000 males, and a literacy rate of 98.5%.

Religions in Aizawl District
Religion	Percent
Christianity	94.71%
Hinduism	3.31%
Islam	1.31%
Buddhism	0.39%
Others	0.28%
