= Zoram People's Movement =

Political party in India

- Abbreviation: ZPM
- Leader: Lalduhoma
- President: Lalliansawta
- Rajya Sabha Leader: K Laltluangkima
- Lok Sabha Leader: Richard Vanlalhmangaiha
- Founded: 2017 (registered party in 2019; recognized state party in 2023)
- Headquarters: Aizawl, Mizoram
- Youth wing: Jeje Lalpekhlua
- Women's wing: Pi Lalrinpuii
- Ideology: Alcohol prohibition; Christian minority rights; Secularism
- Political position: Centre-right
- Colours: Yellow
- ECI status: State Party
- Seats in Rajya Sabha: 1 / 245
- Seats in Lok Sabha: 1 / 543
- Seats in Mizoram Legislative Assembly: 27 / 40

Election symbol
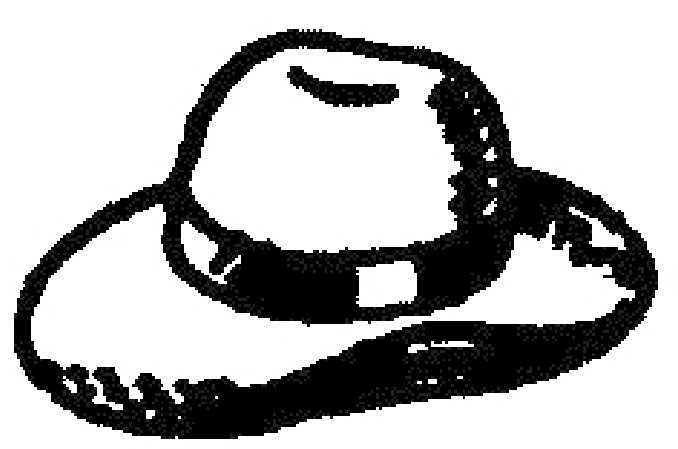

The Zoram People's Movement (ZPM) is a regional political party in the Indian state of Mizoram. It was formed as an alliance of six regional parties under the leadership of Lalduhoma in 2017. The party advocates for secularism and the protection of religious minorities in India.

In its first ever elections in 2018 Mizoram Legislative Assembly election, the alliance won eight seats. It was reformed as a political party and registered with the election commission in 2019. In the 2023 Mizoram Legislative Assembly election, the party won 27 out of 40 seats in the state legislature and Lalduhoma became the chief minister.

== History ==
Zoram People's Movement started as an alliance of six regional parties: the Mizoram People's Conference, Zoram Nationalist Party, Zoram Exodus Movement, Zoram Decentralisation Front, Zoram Reformation Front, and Mizoram People's Party, under the leadership of Lalduhoma. It was created as a political alternative to the Mizo National Front and the Indian National Congress in Mizoram. It advocated for secularism, protection of religious minorities, and for re-imposing a ban on liquor in Mizoram. The alliance contested 36 out of 40 seats and won eight seats in the 2018 Mizoram Legislative Assembly election.

The party was officially registered with the Election Commission of India in July 2019 after submitting a request on 21 January 2019. The Mizoram People's Conference, one of the parties of the initial alliance, and some members of the Zoram Nationalist Party left it thereafter. In the 2023 Mizoram Legislative Assembly election, the party won 27 out of 40 seats in the state legislature and Lalduhoma became the chief minister. In the 2023 local body elections, the party won all the 11 wards in the newly formed Lunglei Municipal Council.

== Electoral performance ==
Election year	Votes	% votes	Seats contested	Seats won
2023 Mizoram Legislative Assembly election	266,127	37.87	40	27
2024 Indian general election	206,377	42.39	1	1

== Positions held ==
=== Chief minister of Mizoram ===
Election	Chief minister	Image	Term start	Term end	Constituency	Cabinet
2023	Lalduhoma		8-Dec-2023	Incumbent	Serchhip	Lalduhoma ministry

=== Leader of the opposition in the Mizoram Legislative Assembly ===
Election	Image	Name	Term start	Term end	Constituency
2018		Lalduhoma	2018	28-Nov-2020	Serchhip
2018		Lalduhoma	2021	5-Dec-2023	Serchhip

=== Member of Parliament ===
Election	Lok Sabha	Member	Constituency	Vote margin
2024	18th	Richard Vanlalhmangaiha	Mizoram	66,845

=== Members of Legislative Assembly ===
No.	Constituency	Name	Remarks
1	Kolasib	Lalfamkima	
2	Chalfilh	Lalbiakzama	
3	Tawi	Lalnilawma	
4	Aizawl North 1	Vanlalhlana	
5	Aizawl North 2	Vanlalthlana	
6	Aizawl North 3	K. Sapdanga	
7	Aizawl East 1	Lalthansanga	
8	Aizawl East 2	B. Lalchhanzova	
9	Aizawl West 1	T. B. C. Lalvenchhunga	
10	Aizawl West 2	Lalnghinglova Hmar	
11	Aizawl West 3	V. L. Zaithanzama	
12	Aizawl South 1	C. Lalsawivunga	
13	Aizawl South 2	Lalchhuanthanga	
14	Aizawl South 3	Baryl Vanneihsangi	
15	Lengteng	F. Rodingliana	
16	Tuichang	W. Chhuanawma	
17	Champhai North	H. Ginzalala	
18	Champhai South	C. Lalhmingthanga	
19	Serchhip	Lalduhoma	Chief Minister
20	Tuikum	P. C. Vanlalruata	
21	Hrangturzo	Lalmuanpuia Punte	
22	South Tuipui	Jeje Lalpekhlua	
23	Lunglei North	V. Malsawmtluanga	
24	Lunglei East	Lalrinpuii	
25	Lunglei West	T. Lalhlimpuia	
26	Lunglei South	Lalramliana Papuia	
27	Lawngtlai East	L. Lalpekliana Chinzah	

== See also ==
- List of political parties in India
