= Kambhampati Hari Babu =

Indian politician and former Governor of Odisha

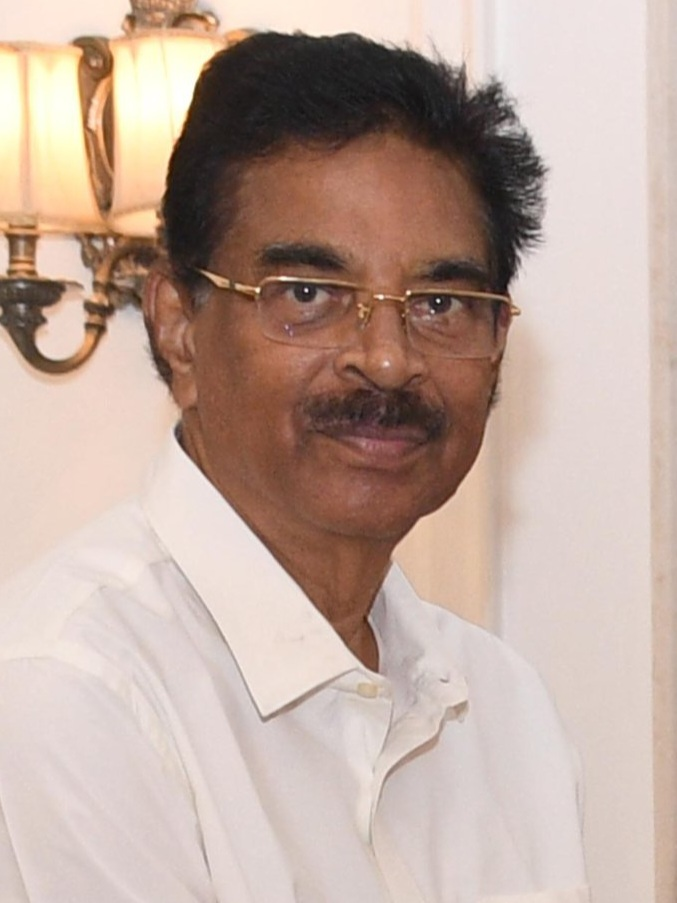
- Kambhampati Hari Babu, c. 2026

Governor of Odisha
- In office 3 January 2025 – 18 October 2026
- Chief Minister: Mohan Charan Majhi
- Preceded by: Raghubar Das
- Succeeded by: Braj Mohan Ram

15th Governor of Mizoram
- In office 9 October 2024 – 2 January 2025
- Chief Minister: Lalduhoma
- Preceded by: N. Indrasena Reddy (additional charge)
- Succeeded by: V. K. Singh
- In office 6 November 2021 – 30 September 2024
- Chief Minister: Zoramthanga; Lalduhoma
- Preceded by: B. D. Mishra (additional charge)
- Succeeded by: N. Indrasena Reddy (additional charge)
- In office 19 July 2021 – 10 August 2021
- Chief Minister: Zoramthanga
- Preceded by: P. S. Sreedharan Pillai
- Succeeded by: B. D. Mishra (additional charge)

10th President of Bharatiya Janata Party, Andhra Pradesh
- In office 2 June 2014 – 13 May 2018
- National President: Amit Shah
- Preceded by: Kishan Reddy (United Andhra Pradesh)
- Succeeded by: Kanna Lakshminarayana

Member of Parliament, Lok Sabha
- In office 16 May 2014 – 23 May 2019
- Preceded by: Daggubati Purandeswari
- Succeeded by: M. V. V. Satyanarayana
- Constituency: Visakhapatnam, Andhra Pradesh

Member of Andhra Pradesh Legislative Assembly
- In office 1999–2004
- Preceded by: Abdul Rehman Shaik
- Succeeded by: Dronamraju Satyanarayana
- Constituency: Visakhapatnam-I

Personal details
- Born: 15 June 1953 (age 73) Thimmasamudram, Madras State, India (present-day Andhra Pradesh)
- Party: Bharatiya Janata Party
- Spouse: Kambhampati Jayasree
- Parents: Venkateswarulu (father); Seethamma (mother)
- Education: Andhra University

Dr. Kambhampati Hari Babu (born 15 June 1953) is an Indian politician who served as the Governor of Odisha from 3 January 2025 to 18 October 2026. He was succeeded by Braj Mohan Ram, who was appointed to the office by President Droupadi Murmu on 12 October 2026 and assumed office on 18 October 2026.

Kambhampati was the first person from the bifurcated state of Andhra Pradesh and the first Telugu person to serve as the Governor of Mizoram. He served as a Member of Parliament in the 16th Lok Sabha, representing the Visakhapatnam Lok Sabha constituency in Andhra Pradesh. He won the 2014 Indian general election as a candidate of the Bharatiya Janata Party. He previously served as the President of the Bharatiya Janata Party in Andhra Pradesh from 2014 to 2018 and was the first president of the party in the bifurcated state of Andhra Pradesh.

== Early life and academic career ==
Hari Babu was born in the village of Thimmasamudram in the Prakasam district of Andhra Pradesh. He moved to Visakhapatnam to pursue higher education at Andhra University (AU). At the university's engineering college, he completed a Bachelor of Engineering (B.E.) degree in Electronics and Communication Engineering, followed by a Master of Engineering (M.E.) degree with a specialization in Electrical and Control Systems. He subsequently completed a Doctor of Philosophy (PhD) degree focused on Control Systems at the same institution.

During the mid-1970s, while studying at Andhra University, Hari Babu participated in student politics and student leadership roles associated with the movements led by Jayaprakash Narayan. During this period, he was a student contemporary of Venkaiah Naidu, who was also involved in student politics at the university.

Following his postgraduate studies, Hari Babu joined the faculty of the Andhra University Engineering College. He taught core engineering subjects and served as a faculty member for 24 years, eventually reaching the rank of Associate Professor. In 1993, he took voluntary retirement from university service to enter full-time public service and electoral politics.

== Political career ==
Hari Babu began his political career during his student years when he participated in the Jai Andhra movement in support for the creation of Andhra State . As a student leader, he worked alongside other leaders such as Tenneti Viswanadham, Gouthu Latchanna, and Venkaiah Naidu. He also served as the Secretary of the Students' Union at Andhra University Engineering College from 1972 to 1973.

During 1974 to 1975, Hari Babu joined the Lok Sangharsh Samithi agitation led by Jayaprakash Narayan, protesting against the Emergency. He was arrested under the Maintenance of Internal Security Act (MISA) and imprisoned for six months in Visakhapatnam Central Jail and Mushirabad Jail.

In 1977, he became a member of the Andhra Pradesh State Executive Committee of the Janata Party and served as the Vice President of the Andhra Pradesh State Janata Yuva Morcha in 1978. By the early 1990s, he had aligned with the Bharatiya Janata Party, serving as a member of the Andhra Pradesh State Executive Committee from 1991 to 1993 and as the General Secretary of the state unit from 1993 to 2003.

In 1999, Hari Babu was elected as a Member of Legislative Assembly from the Visakhapatnam-I Assembly constituency and became the floor leader for Bharatiya Janata Legislature Party in Andhra Pradesh in 2003. In March 2014, he was elected as the President of the state unit. He won the 2014 Indian general election from the Visakhapatnam Lok Sabha constituency as a BJP candidate, defeating YSR Congress Party candidate Y. S. Vijayamma by a margin of 90,488 votes.

== Governorships (2021 - 2026) ==
=== Governor of Mizoram (2021 - 2025) ===
On 19 July 2021, Hari Babu was appointed the Governor of Mizoram.

=== Governor of Odisha (2025 - 2026) ===
On 24 December 2024, he was appointed the Governor of Odisha.

== Electoral history ==
Election results
Year	Office	Constituency	Party	Votes	%	Opponent	Party	Votes	%	Result
1999	MLA	Visakhapatnam-I	Bharatiya Janata Party	34,696	46.10	Sabbam Hari	Indian National Congress	26,285	34.93	Won
2004	MLA	Visakhapatnam-I	Bharatiya Janata Party	24,885		Dronamraju Satyanarayana	Indian National Congress	41,652		Lost
2014	MP	Visakhapatnam	Bharatiya Janata Party	566,832	48.71	Y. S. Vijayamma	YSR Congress Party	476,344	40.94	Won

== Development works ==
Hari Babu prioritized the use of his MPLADS funds on key areas such as health, education, drinking water, and skill development. He has advocated for transparency in the utilization of MPLADS funds and implementation of large, long-term projects aimed at addressing persistent issues. Notable projects include provision of toilets and furniture in government schools, drinking water facilities in areas not under the purview of Greater Visakhapatnam Municipal Corporation. To encourage people's participation, he organized the "One MP–One Idea" contest.

Lok Sabha
Preceded by Daggubati Purandeswari	Member of Parliament for Visakhapatnam; 2014 – 2019	Succeeded by M. V. V. Satyanarayana
Government offices
Preceded by P. S. Sreedharan Pillai	Governor of Mizoram; 19 July 2021 - 10 August 2021	Succeeded by B. D. Mishra
Preceded by B. D. Mishra	Governor of Mizoram; 7 November 2021 - 15 January 2025	Succeeded by V. K. Singh
Preceded by Raghubar Das	Governor of Odisha; 3 January 2025 - Present	Incumbent
