= Zoram Nationalist Party =

Political party in India

Zoram National Party
- Abbreviation: ZNP
- President: H. Lalrinmawia
- Founded: 1997
- Headquarters: Treasury Square, Aizawl, Mizoram
- ECI status: State Party
- Alliance: Mizoram Secular Alliance; INDIA (Aug 2023–present)

Election symbol
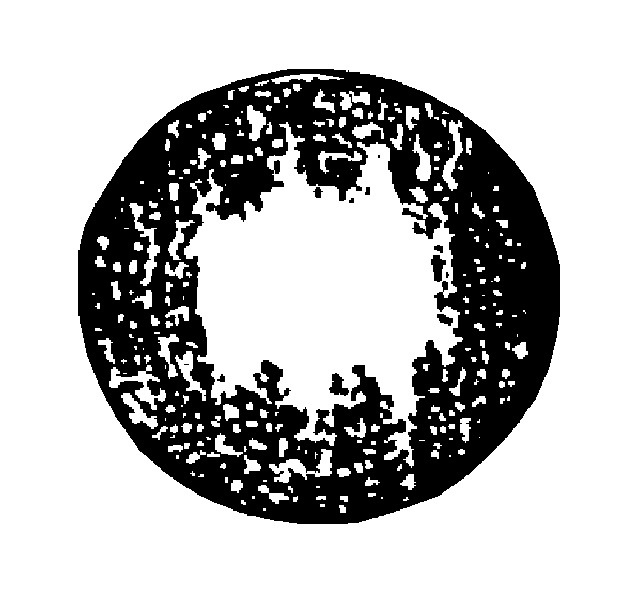

Zoram Nationalist Party is a political party in Mizoram, India. The party was formerly known as Mizo National Front (Nationalist). It was founded by former MP Lalduhoma. MNF(N) was formed in 1997 through a split in the Mizo National Front.

The party won two seats in the state assembly in both the 2003 and 2008 state elections. In 2018, it merged with various regional parties to form Zoram People's Movement (ZPM), but left ZPM in 2020.

ZNP formed alliance with Indian National Congress and Mizoram People's Conference before 2023 assembly elections, against NDA partner and ruling party Mizo National Front named "Mizoram Secular Alliance".

== See also ==
- List of political parties in India
