= Mizoram Legislative Assembly =

State legislature of Mizoram, India

- 9th Mizoram Assembly

Type
- Type: Unicameral
- Term limits: 5 years

History
- Founded: 10 May 1972 (54 years ago)

Leadership
- Speaker of the House: Lalbiakzama, ZPM since 2023
- Deputy Speaker of the House: Lalfamkima, ZPM since 2023
- Leader of the House (Chief Minister): Lalduhoma, ZPM since 2023
- Leader of the Opposition: Lalchhandama Ralte, MNF since 2023

Structure
- Seats: 40
- Political groups: Government (27): ZPM (27); Opposition (13): MNF (10); BJP (2); INC (1)

Elections
- Voting system: First past the post
- Last election: 7 November 2023
- Next election: 2028

Meeting place
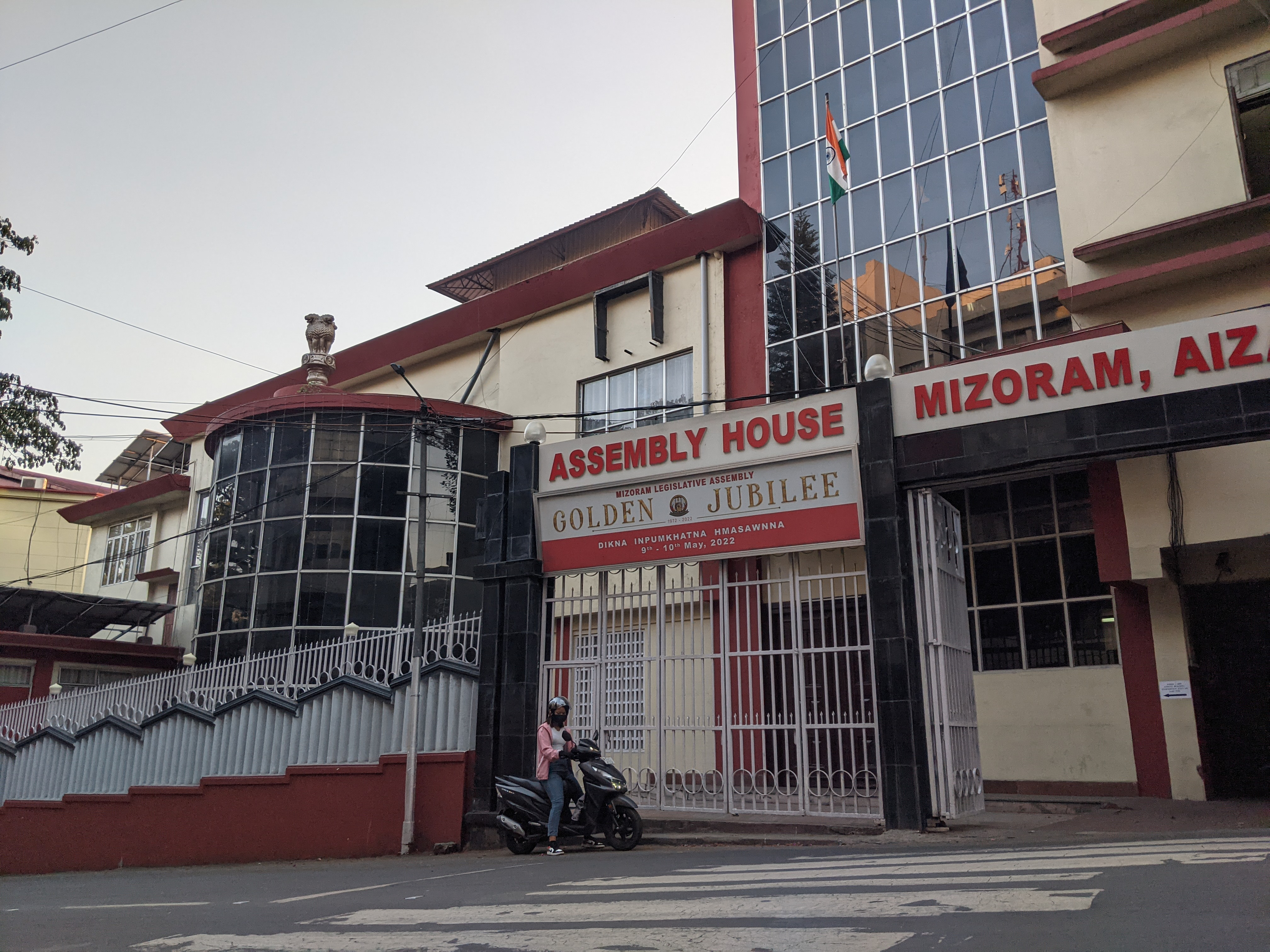
- Legislative Assembly House, Aizawl, Mizoram, India – 796001

Website
- Legislative Assembly of Mizoram

The Mizoram Legislative Assembly is the unicameral state legislature of Mizoram in India. The seat of the Legislative Assembly is at Aizawl, the capital of the state. The Legislative Assembly is composed of 40 members, who are directly elected from single-seat constituencies. The current legislature was elected in 2023 Mizoram Legislative Assembly election, and its term will last until 2028.

== List of assemblies ==
Assembly	Tenure	Party	Chief Minister
1st	1987–1989	Independent/MNF 24 seats	Laldenga
2nd	1989–1993	Indian National Congress 23 seats	Lal Thanhawla
3rd	1993–1998	Indian National Congress 16 seats	Lal Thanhawla
4th	1998–2003	Mizo National Front 21 seats	Zoramthanga
5th	2003–2008	Mizo National Front 21 seats	Zoramthanga
6th	2008–2013	Indian National Congress 32 seats	Lal Thanhawla
7th	2013–2018	Indian National Congress 34 seats	Lal Thanhawla
8th	2018 – 2023	Mizo National Front 28 seats	Zoramthanga
9th	2023– Present	Zoram People's Movement 27 Seats	Lalduhoma

== Members of Legislative Assembly ==
District	No.	Constituency	Name	Party	Remarks
Mamit	1	Hachhek	Robert Romawia Royte	Mizo National Front	
Mamit	2	Dampa	Lalrintluanga Sailo	Mizo National Front	Died on 21 July 2025
Mamit	2	Dampa	R. Lalthangliana	Mizo National Front	Elected on 14 November 2025
Mamit	3	Mamit	H. Lalzirliana	Mizo National Front	
Kolasib	4	Tuirial	K. Laldawngliana	Mizo National Front	
Kolasib	5	Kolasib	Lalfamkima	Zoram People's Movement	
Kolasib	6	Serlui	Lalrinsanga Ralte	Mizo National Front	
Aizawl	7	Tuivawl	Lalchhandama Ralte	Mizo National Front	Leader of Opposition
Aizawl	8	Chalfilh	Lalbiakzama	Zoram People's Movement	
Aizawl	9	Tawi	Lalnilawma	Zoram People's Movement	
Aizawl	10	Aizawl North 1	Vanlalhlana	Zoram People's Movement	
Aizawl	11	Aizawl North 2	Vanlalthlana	Zoram People's Movement	
Aizawl	12	Aizawl North 3	K. Sapdanga	Zoram People's Movement	
Aizawl	13	Aizawl East 1	Lalthansanga	Zoram People's Movement	
Aizawl	14	Aizawl East 2	B. Lalchhanzova	Zoram People's Movement	
Aizawl	15	Aizawl West 1	T. B. C. Lalvenchhunga	Zoram People's Movement	
Aizawl	16	Aizawl West 2	Lalnghinglova Hmar	Zoram People's Movement	
Aizawl	17	Aizawl West 3	V. L. Zaithanzama	Zoram People's Movement	
Aizawl	18	Aizawl South 1	C. Lalsawivunga	Zoram People's Movement	
Aizawl	19	Aizawl South 2	Lalchhuanthanga	Zoram People's Movement	
Aizawl	20	Aizawl South 3	Baryl Vanneihsangi	Zoram People's Movement	
Champhai	21	Lengteng	F. Rodingliana	Zoram People's Movement	
Champhai	22	Tuichang	W. Chhuanawma	Zoram People's Movement	
Champhai	23	Champhai North	H. Ginzalala	Zoram People's Movement	
Champhai	24	Champhai South	C. Lalhmingthanga	Zoram People's Movement	
Champhai	25	East Tuipui	Ramthanmawia	Mizo National Front	
Serchhip	26	Serchhip	Lalduhoma	Zoram People's Movement	Chief Minister
Serchhip	27	Tuikum	P. C. Vanlalruata	Zoram People's Movement	
Serchhip	28	Hrangturzo	Lalmuanpuia Punte	Zoram People's Movement	
Lunglei	29	South Tuipui	Jeje Lalpekhlua	Zoram People's Movement	
Lunglei	30	Lunglei North	V. Malsawmtluanga	Zoram People's Movement	
Lunglei	31	Lunglei East	Lalrinpuii	Zoram People's Movement	
Lunglei	32	Lunglei West	T. Lalhlimpuia	Zoram People's Movement	
Lunglei	33	Lunglei South	Lalramliana Papuia	Zoram People's Movement	
Lunglei	34	Thorang	R. Rohmingliana	Mizo National Front	
Lunglei	35	West Tuipui	Prova Chakma	Mizo National Front	
Lawngtlai	36	Tuichawng	Rasik Mohan Chakma	Mizo National Front	
Lawngtlai	37	Lawngtlai West	C. Ngunlianchunga	Indian National Congress	
Lawngtlai	38	Lawngtlai East	L. Lalpekliana Chinzah	Zoram People's Movement	
Saiha	39	Saiha	K. Beichhua	Bharatiya Janata Party	
Saiha	40	Palak	Pushpa K. Hrahmo	Bharatiya Janata Party	

== Past Composition ==
1972–1978

6	24
INC (I)	Ind

1978–1979

22	8
MPC	Ind

1979–1984

5	18	2	5
INC (I)	MPC	JP	Ind

1984–1987

20	8	2
INC (I)	MPC	Ind

1987–1989

13	3	24
INC	MPC	MNF

1989–1993

23	1	14	2
INC	MPC	MNF	Ind

1993-1998

16	14	10
INC	MNF	Ind

1998-2003

6	12	21	2
INC	MPC	MNF	Ind

2003-2008

12	3	2	1	1	21
INC	MPC	ZNP	MDF	HPC	MNF

2008-2013

32	2	2	1	3
INC	MPC	ZNP	MDF	MNF

2013-2018

34	1	5
INC	MPC	MNF

2018-2023

5	8	26	1
INC	ZPM	MNF	BJP

2023-Present

1	27	10	2
INC	ZPM	MNF	BJP

== See also ==
- State governments of India
- Government of Mizoram
