= 8th Mizoram Legislative Assembly =

The 8th Mizoran Legislative Assembly was constituted in 2018 and held twelve sessions before being succeeded by the 9th assembly in 2024. It represented the northeastern state of Mizoram, India. The Mizo National Front, led by Pu Zoramthanga, won an absolute majority. Pu Lalrinliana Sailo served as Speaker.

== Members of Legislative Assembly ==
District	No.	Constituency	Name	Party	Remarks
Mamit	1	Hachhek	Lalrindika Ralte	Indian National Congress	
Mamit	2	Dampa	Lalrintluanga Sailo	Mizo National Front	
Mamit	3	Mamit	H Lalzirliana	Mizo National Front	
Kolasib	4	Tuirial	Andrew H. Thangliana	Zoram People's Movement	Death of Andrew H. Thangliana
Kolasib	4	Tuirial	K Laldawngliana	Mizo National Front	Won in 2021 bypoll
Kolasib	5	Kolasib	K Lalrinliana	Mizo National Front	
Kolasib	6	Serlui	Lalrinsanga Ralte	Mizo National Front	
Aizawl	7	Tuivawl	Lalchhandama Ralte	Mizo National Front	
Aizawl	8	Chalfilh	Lalrinliana Sailo	Mizo National Front	Speaker of the Mizoram Legislative Assembly
Aizawl	9	Tawi	R Lalzirliana	Mizo National Front	
Aizawl	10	Aizawl North 1	Vanlalhlana	Zoram People's Movement	
Aizawl	11	Aizawl North 2	Dr Vanlalthlana	Zoram People's Movement	
Aizawl	12	Aizawl North 3	C Lalmuanpuia	Mizo National Front	
Aizawl	13	Aizawl East 1	Zoramthanga	Mizo National Front	Chief Minister
Aizawl	14	Aizawl East 2	Robert Romawia Royte	Mizo National Front	
Aizawl	15	Aizawl West 1	Lalduhoma	Independent	Resignation by Lalduhoma.
Aizawl	15	Aizawl West 1	Zothantluanga	Mizo National Front	Won in 2019 bypoll
Aizawl	16	Aizawl West 2	Lalruatkima	Mizo National Front	
Aizawl	17	Aizawl West 3	Vl Zaithanzama	Zoram People's Movement	
Aizawl	18	Aizawl South 1	C Lalsawivunga	Zoram People's Movement	
Aizawl	19	Aizawl South 2	Lalchhuanthanga	Zoram People's Movement	
Aizawl	20	Aizawl South 3	F Lalnunmawia	Mizo National Front	
Champhai	21	Lengteng	Lthangmawia	Mizo National Front	
Champhai	22	Tuichang	Tawnluia	Mizo National Front	Deputy Chief Minister
Champhai	23	Champhai North	Dr Zrthiamsanga	Mizo National Front	
Champhai	24	Champhai South	Tj Lalnuntluanga	Mizo National Front	
Champhai	25	East Tuipui	Ramthanmawia	Mizo National Front	
Serchhip	26	Serchhip	Lalduhoma	Zoram People's Movement	Won in 2021 bypoll necessitated after he was disqualified for violating the anti-defection law. Leader of the Opposition
Serchhip	27	Tuikum	Er Lalrinawma	Mizo National Front	
Serchhip	28	Hrangturzo	Lalchamliana	Mizo National Front	
Lunglei	29	South Tuipui	Dr R. Lalthangliana	Mizo National Front	
Lunglei	30	Lunglei North	Vanlaltanpuia	Mizo National Front	
Lunglei	31	Lunglei East	Lawmawma Tochhawng	Mizo National Front	
Lunglei	32	Lunglei West	C Lalrinsanga	Mizo National Front	
Lunglei	33	Lunglei South	K Pachhunga	Mizo National Front	
Lunglei	34	Thorang	Zodintluanga Ralte	Indian National Congress	Leader of the Congress Legislature Party (CLP)
Lunglei	35	West Tuipui	Nihar Kanti Chakma	Indian National Congress	
Lawngtlai	36	Tuichawng	Buddha Dhan Chakma	Bharatiya Janata Party	
Lawngtlai	37	Lawngtlai West	C Ngunlianchunga	Indian National Congress	
Lawngtlai	38	Lawngtlai East	H. Biakzaua	Mizo National Front	Deputy speaker
Saiha	39	Saiha	K. Beichhua	Mizo National Front	
Saiha	40	Palak	Kt Rokhaw	Indian National Congress	

== See also ==
- 2018 Mizoram Legislative Assembly election
