= 2023 Mizoram Legislative Assembly election =

Legislative Assembly election of Mizoram in 2023

- 7 November 2023

All 40 seats in the Mizoram Legislative Assembly 21 seats needed for a majority
- Opinion polls
- Turnout: 80.66% (▼0.95 pp)
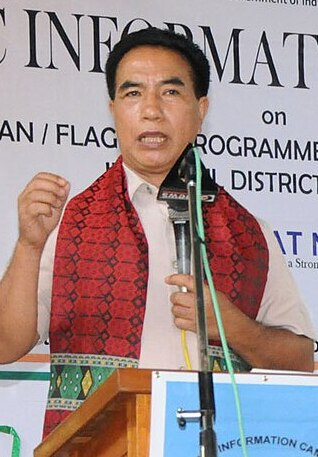

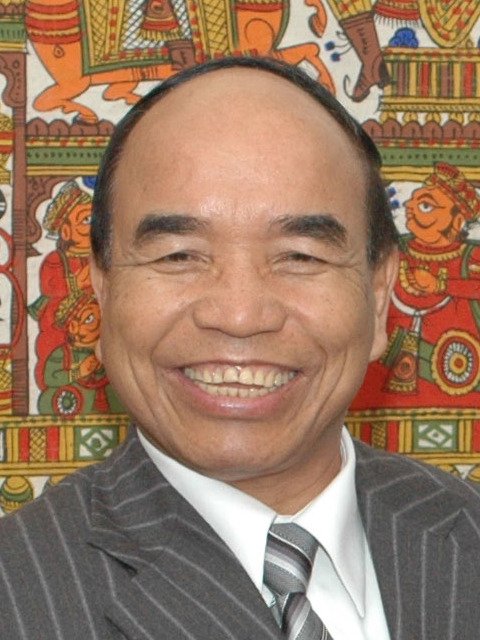

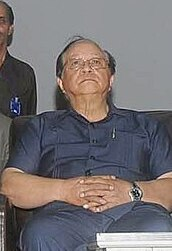
	Majority party	Minority party
Leader	Lalduhoma	Zoramthanga
Party	ZPM	MNF
Leader since	2018	1998
Leader's seat	Serchhip (won)	Aizawl East 1 (lost)
Last election	22.9%, 8 seats	37.7%, 26 seats
Seats won	27	10
Seat change	▲19	▼16
Popular vote	2,65,755	2,46,338
Percentage	37.86%	35.10%
Swing	▲14.96 pp	▼2.6 pp
	Third party	Fourth party
Leader	Vanlalhmuaka	Lalsawta
Party	BJP	INC
Leader since	2018	2018
Leader's seat	Dampa (lost)	Aizawl West 3 (lost)
Last election	8.09%, 1 seat	28.9%, 5 seats
Seats won	2	1
Seat change	▲1	▼4
Popular vote	35,524	1,46,113
Percentage	5.06%	20.82%
Swing	▼3.03 pp	▼9.16 pp

- Structure of the Mizoram Legislative Assembly after the election
Chief Minister before election
Zoramthanga
MNF
Chief Minister after election
Lalduhoma
ZPM

Legislative Assembly elections were held in Mizoram on 7 November 2023 to elect all 40 members of Mizoram Legislative Assembly, which had 174 candidates and saw 80.66% voter turnout. The votes were counted on 4 December 2023 which showed the Zoram People's Movement's victory winning 27 seats out of 40.

== Background ==
The tenure of Mizoram Legislative Assembly is scheduled to end on 17 December 2023. The previous assembly elections were held in November 2018. After the election, Mizo National Front formed the state government, with Zoramthanga becoming Chief Minister.

The total number of voters in Mizoram is 856,297, comprising 414,777 male, 441,520 female.

== Schedule ==
The election schedule was announced by the Election Commission of India on 9 October 2023. The date of counting of votes was postponed from 3 December 2023 to 4 December 2023.

Poll event	Schedule
Notification date	13 October 2023
Start of nomination	13 October 2023
Last date for filing nomination	20 October 2023
Scrutiny of nomination	21 October 2023
Last date for withdrawal of nomination	23 October 2023
Date of poll	7 November 2023
Date of Counting of Votes	4 December 2023

== Parties and alliances ==
Party	Flag	Symbol	Leader	Seats contested
Mizo National Front			Zoramthanga	40
Indian National Congress			Lalsawta	40
Zoram People's Movement			Lalduhawma	40
Bharatiya Janata Party			Vanlalhmuaka	23
Aam Aadmi Party			Andrew Lalremkima	4
INDEPENDENT				27

== Candidates ==
District	Constituency									
District	Constituency		MNF		INC		BJP		ZPM	
Mamit	1	Hachhek	MNF	Robert Romawia Royte	INC	Lalrindika Ralte	BJP	Malsawmtluanga	ZPM	KJ Lalbiakngheta
Mamit	2	Dampa	MNF	Lalrintluanga Sailo	INC	Lalhmingthanga Sailo	BJP	Vanlalhmuaka	ZPM	Vanlalsailova
Mamit	3	Mamit	MNF	Er. H. Lalzirliana	INC	K. Lalthanzama	BJP	Lalrinliana Sailo	ZPM	H.Zorempuia
Kolasib	4	Tuirial	MNF	K. Laldawngliana	INC	Henry Zodinliana Pachuau	BJP	F. Vanhmingthanga	ZPM	Laltlanmawia
Kolasib	5	Kolasib	MNF	K. Lalrinliana	INC	S. Lalrinawma	BJP	R. Lalthangliana	ZPM	Lalfamkima
Kolasib	6	Serlui	MNF	Lalrinsanga Ralte	INC	Lalhmachhuana	BJP	Robinson Malsawmtluanga Hmar	ZPM	Jimmy Laltlanmawia
Aizawl	7	Tuivawl	MNF	Lalchhandama Ralte	INC	R. L. Pianmawia	BJP	K Changliana	ZPM	JMS Dawngliana
Aizawl	8	Chalfilh	MNF	K. Lalhmangaiha	INC	Vanneihthanga	BJP	Dr. Zonuntluanga	ZPM	Lalbiakzama
Aizawl	9	Tawi	MNF	Lairinenga Sailo	INC	Lalringliana Khiangte	BJP		ZPM	Lalnilawma
Aizawl	10	Aizawl North 1	MNF	R. Lalzirliana	INC	Lalnunmawia Chuaungo	BJP		ZPM	Vanlalhlana
Aizawl	11	Aizawl North 2	MNF	Vanlalsawma	INC	R. Lalrinmawia	BJP		ZPM	Vanlalthlana
Aizawl	12	Aizawl North 3	MNF	C. Lalmuanpuial	INC	Lal Thanzara	BJP	Chawnghmingthanga	ZPM	K. Sapdanga
Aizawl	13	Aizawl East 1	MNF	Zoramthanga	INC	Lalsanglura Ralte	BJP		ZPM	Lalthansanga
Aizawl	14	Aizawl East 2	MNF	B. Lalawmpuii	INC	P. C. Lalhmingthanga	BJP		ZPM	B. Lalchhanzova
Aizawl	15	Aizawl West 1	MNF	Zothantluanga	INC	H. Lalbiakthanga	BJP		ZPM	T. B. C. Lalvenchhunga
Aizawl	16	Aizawl West 2	MNF	Lalruatkima	INC	Ngurdingliana	BJP		ZPM	Lainghinglova Hmar
Aizawl	17	Aizawl West 3	MNF	Er. K. Lalsawmvela	INC	Lalsawta	BJP		ZPM	V. L. Zaithanzama
Aizawl	18	Aizawl South 1	MNF	K. Vanlalvena	INC	Vanlalawmpuii Chawngthu	BJP	F Lalremsangi	ZPM	C. Lalsawivunga
Aizawl	19	Aizawl South 2	MNF	Denghmingthanga	INC	Lalmalsawma Nghaka	BJP		ZPM	Lalchhuanthanga
Aizawl	20	Aizawl South 3	MNF	F. Lalnunmawia	INC	Rosiamngheta	BJP		ZPM	Baryl Vanneihsangi
Champhai	21	Lengteng	MNF	L. Thangmawia	INC	Lalhmingthanga Pachuau	BJP	B. Suanzalang	ZPM	F.Rodingliana
Champhai	22	Tuichang	MNF	Tawnluia	INC	C. Lalhriatpuia	BJP		ZPM	W. Chhuanawma
Champhai	23	Champhai North	MNF	Z. R. Thiamsanga	INC	K. Lalnunmawia	BJP	PS Zatluanga	ZPM	Er. Ginzalala
Champhai	24	Champhai South	MNF	T. J. Lalnuntluanga	INC	Lallianchhunga	BJP		ZPM	Clement Lalhmingthanga
Champhai	25	East Tuipui	MNF	Ramthanmawia	INC	C. Lalnunthanga	BJP		ZPM	C. Lalrammawia
Serchhip	26	Serchhip	MNF	J. Malsawmzuala Vanchhawng	INC	R. Vanlaltluanga	BJP	K. Vanlalruati	ZPM	Lalduhoma
Serchhip	27	Tuikum	MNF	Lalrinawma	INC	T. T. Zothansanga	BJP		ZPM	P. C. Vanlalruata
Serchhip	28	Hrangturzo	MNF	Lalremruata Chhangte	INC	F. Lalroenga	BJP	Lalmalsawma	ZPM	Lalmuanpula Punte
Lunglei	29	South Tuipui	MNF	R. Lalthangliana	INC	C. Laldintluanga	BJP		ZPM	Jeje Lalpekhlua
Lunglei	30	Lunglei North	MNF	Vanlaltanpuia	INC	Eric R. Zomuanpuia	BJP		ZPM	V. Malsawmtluanga
Lunglei	31	Lunglei East	MNF	Lawmawma Tochhawng	INC	Joseph Lalhimpuia	BJP		ZPM	Lalrinpull
Lunglei	32	Lunglei West	MNF	C Lalrinsanga	INC	P. C. Lalthanliana	BJP	R. Lalbiaktluangi	ZPM	T. Lalhlimpuia
Lunglei	33	Lunglei South	MNF	K. Pachhunga	INC	Meriam L. Hrangchal	BJP	T. Biaksailova	ZPM	Lalramliana
Lunglei	34	Thorang	MNF	R. Rohmingliana	INC	Zodintluanga Ralte	BJP	Shanti Bikash Chakma	ZPM	C. Lalnunnema
Lunglei	35	West Tuipui	MNF	Prova Chakma	INC	Nihar Kanti Chakma	BJP	T. Lalengthanga	ZPM	Kawlhnuna IFS (Rtd)
Lawngtlai	36	Tuichawng	MNF	Rasik Mohan Chakma	INC	Hara Prasad Chakma	BJP	Durjya Dhan Chakma	ZPM	Shanti Jiban Chakma
Lawngtlai	37	Lawngtlai West	MNF	V. Zirsanga	INC	C. Ngunlianchunga	BJP	R. Lalbiaktluangi	ZPM	Lalnunsema
Lawngtlai	38	Lawngtlai East	MNF	H. Biakzaua	INC	H. Zothangliana	BJP	NC Muankima	ZPM	Lorrain Lalpekliana Chinzah
Saiha	39	Saiha	MNF	HC Lalmalsawma Zasai	INC	N. Chakhai	BJP	K. Beichhua	ZPM	KH Beithie
Saiha	40	Palak	MNF	KT Rokhaw	INC	I. P. Junior	BJP	K. Hrahmo	ZPM	K. Robinson

== Campaigns ==
Violence between the Kuki (who constitute the majority in the state) Christian and the Meitei Hindu in the neighbouring state of Manipur that year was a major political issue alongside clashes between police personnel of the state & that of the neighbouring state of Assam over border disputes in 2021.

=== Mizo National Front ===
==== Manifesto ====
MNF Election Manifesto:

- Unification of Zo people across the world under one government with "higher authority" in accordance with the UN's 2007 Declaration on the Rights of the Indigenous People.
- Implementation of all clauses of the Mizoram Peace Accord of 1986
- Border Protection

=== Indian National Congress ===
==== Manifesto ====
Mizoram PCC Election Manifesto:

- Reintroduction of the Old Pension Scheme
- Subsidized LPG cylinders at Rs 750 for poor households
- 'Tang Puihna' scheme - Rs 2 lakh financial assistance to farmers and entrepreneurs to develop sustainable economic and livelihood activities.
- Budgetary provision of Rs 5 crore every year, for Cancer patients.
- 'Young Mizo entrepreneurs programme' to fund startups.
- Old-age pension of Rs 2,000 per month.
- Health insurance cover of Rs 15 lakh per family for Hospital treatments.

=== Bharatiya Janata Party ===
==== Manifesto ====
BJP Mizoram Election Manifesto:

- “Mission EDU Upgrade or Education upgrade" and “Zirlai Simathawana Mission" with budget of ₹250 crore and ₹350 crore respectively to renovate the government schools and colleges.
- Establishment of Mizoram sports academy.
- Scholarships for athletes.
- Launching of Mizoram Olympic mission
- Upgrading the Zoram medical college in Mizoram as the regional institute of medical sciences
- Launching "Operation Drug Free Mizoram" to curb the drug addiction among youth.
- Women empowerment scheme to give ₹1.5 lakh financial assistance to every girl child.
- 33% reservation for women in government jobs Urban and Rural infrastructure
- 'Mizoram Urban Infrastructure Development Mission' and 'Mizoram Rural Infrastructure Development Mission' with a budget of ₹400 crore and ₹950 crore respectively.
- Introduction of Mizo Agri Infra Mission with ₹1000 crore investment to revamp the agricultural infrastructure.
- Resolving long-standing border with Assam government.

== Voting ==
=== Turnout ===
The highest voter participation was at Serchhip district at (84.78%), followed by the Mamit district (84.23%) and the Hnahthial district (84.1%). The Assembly constituency with highest turnout was Tuikum at 87.32%.

The female voters had a slightly higher turnout (81.25%) than male voters (80.04%).

=== Re-polling ===
Re-polling was done in the Muallungthu voting centre in Aizawl South-III constituency on 10 November 2023 because the voting personnel did not clear the mock poll data from the Electronic Voting Machine (EVM).

== Surveys and polls ==
=== Opinion polls ===
Seat share
Polling agency	Date published	Margin of error	Sample size					Majority
Polling agency	Date published	Margin of error	Sample size	MNF	INC	ZPM	BJP	Majority
ABP News-CVoter	9 October 2023	±3–5%	1,758	13-17	10-14	9-13	1-3	Hung
ABP News-CVoter	4 November 2023	±3–5%	2,246	17-21	6-10	10-14	0-2	MNF

Vote share
Polling agency	Date published	Margin of error	Sample size					Lead
Polling agency	Date published	Margin of error	Sample size	MNF	INC	ZPM	BJP	Lead
ABP News-CVoter	9 October 2023	±3–5%	1,758	30.5%	28.3%	27.1%	14.2%	1.2%
ABP News-CVoter	4 November 2023	±3–5%	2,246	34.7%	30.1%	25.8%	9%	4.6%

=== Exit polls ===
Opinion polls were released on 30 November 2023.

Polling Agency					Majority
Polling Agency	MNF	INC	ZPM	BJP	Majority
India TV-CNX	14-18	8-10	12-16	0-2	Hung
Jan Ki Baat	10-14	5-9	15-25	0-2	Hung
India Today-Axis My India	3-7	2-4	28-35	0-2	ZPM
ABP News-CVoter	15-21	2-8	12-18	0-5	Hung
Republic TV-Matrize	17-22	7-10	7-12	1-2	Hung
Times Now-ETG	14-18	9-13	10-14	0-2	Hung
Poll of Polls	14	7	17	2	Hung
Actual Results	10	1	27	2	ZPM

== Results ==
Results were initially scheduled to be published on 3 December alongside those of Madhya Pradesh, Chhattisgarh, Rajasthan & Telangana but was rescheduled to 4 December, because of 3 December being a major holiday for the Christian majority in Mizoram that year.

=== Results by party ===
Party	Popular vote			Seats		
Party	Votes	%	±pp	Contested	Won	+/−
Zoram People's Movement	266,127	37.87%	▲37.87	40	27	▲19
Mizo National Front	246,676	35.11%	▼2.59	40	10	▼16
Indian National Congress	146,172	20.80%	▼9.18	40	1	▼4
Bharatiya Janata Party	35,524	5.05%	▼3.04	23	2	▲1
Aam Aadmi Party	615	0.09%	▲0.09	4	–	Steady
Independents	4,753	0.68%	▼22.26	27	–	Steady
NOTA	2,779	0.40%	▼0.06			
Total	702,646	100%	-	174	40	-
Vote statistics
Valid votes	702,646	99.66%				
Invalid votes	2,411	0.34%				
Votes cast/turnout	705,057	82.26%				
Abstentions	152,006	17.74				
Registered voters	857,063					

=== Results by district ===
District	Seats				
District	Seats	ZPM	MNF	BJP	INC
Mamit	3	—N/a	3	—N/a	—N/a
Kolasib	3	1	2	—N/a	—N/a
Aizawl	14	13	1	—N/a	—N/a
Champhai	5	4	1	—N/a	—N/a
Serchhip	3	3	—N/a	—N/a	—N/a
Lunglei	7	5	2	—N/a	—N/a
Lawngtlai	3	1	1	—N/a	1
Saiha	2	—N/a	—N/a	2	—N/a
Total	40	27	10	2	1

=== Results by constituency ===
District	Constituency		Winner				Runner-up				Margin	
District	No.	Name	Candidate	Party	Votes	%	Candidate	Party	Votes	%	Margin	
Mamit	1	Hachhek	Robert Romawia Royte	MNF	5,705	32.42	K.J. Lalbiakngheta	ZPM	5,399	30.68	Margin	306
Mamit	2	Dampa	Lalrintluanga Sailo	MNF	6,218	35.65	Vanlalsailova	ZPM	5,926	33.97	292	
Mamit	3	Mamit	H. Lalzirliana	MNF	7,167	34.90	K. Lalthanzama	INC	5,375	26.17	1,792	
Kolasib	4	Tuirial	K. Laldawngliana	MNF	6,610	41.69	Laltlanmawia	ZPM	6,597	41.61	13	
Kolasib	5	Kolasib	Lalfamkima	ZPM	8,657	43.96	K. Lalrinliana	MNF	7,488	38.02	1,169	
Kolasib	6	Serlui	Lalrinsanga Ralte	MNF	7,242	39.74	Lalhmachhuana	INC	6,336	34.77	906	
Aizawl	7	Tuivawl	Lalchhandama Ralte	MNF	6,501	44.18	JMS Dawngliana	ZPM	4,482	30.48	2,019	
Aizawl	8	Chalfilh	Lalbiakzama	ZPM	6,637	43.26	K. Lalhmangaiha	MNF	4,804	31.31	1,833	
Aizawl	9	Tawi	Lalnilawma	ZPM	6,991	47.45	Lalrinenga Sailo	MNF	5,439	36.91	1,552	
Aizawl	10	Aizawl North 1	Vanlalhlana	ZPM	10,772	51.27	R.Lalzirliana	MNF	5,287	25.16	5,485	
Aizawl	11	Aizawl North 2	Vanlalthlana	ZPM	11,040	55.94	Vanlalsawma	MNF	4,533	22.97	6,507	
Aizawl	12	Aizawl North 3	K. Sapdanga	ZPM	6,783	42.10	C. Lalmuanpuia	MNF	4,913	30.50	1,870	
Aizawl	13	Aizawl East 1	Lalthansanga	ZPM	10,727	47.88	Zoramthanga	MNF	8,626	38.50	2,101	
Aizawl	14	Aizawl East 2	B. Lalchhanzova	ZPM	7,289	48.41	B. Lalawmpuii	MNF	4,533	30.11	2,756	
Aizawl	15	Aizawl West 1	T. B. C. Lalvenchhunga	ZPM	11,872	49.68	Zothantluanga	MNF	7,205	30.15	4,667	
Aizawl	16	Aizawl West 2	Lalnghinglova Hmar	ZPM	10,398	58.95	Lalruatkima	MNF	5,579	31.63	4,819	
Aizawl	17	Aizawl West 3	V. L. Zaithanzama	ZPM	9,202	49.46	K.Lalsawmvela	MNF	4,620	24.83	4,582	
Aizawl	18	Aizawl South 1	C. Lalsawivunga	ZPM	9,124	50.07	K. Vanlalvena	MNF	5,499	30.18	3,625	
Aizawl	19	Aizawl South 2	Lalchhuanthanga	ZPM	9,117	41.20	Lalmalsawma Nghaka	INC	7,478	33.79	1,639	
Aizawl	20	Aizawl South 3	Baryl Vanneihsangi Tlau	ZPM	9,370	47.67	F. Lalnunmawia	MNF	7,956	40.48	1,414	
Champhai	21	Lengteng	F. Rodingliana	ZPM	6,171	41.48	L. Thangmawia	MNF	6,124	41.16	47	
Champhai	22	Tuichang	W. Chhuanawma	ZPM	6,988	47.03	Tawnluia	MNF	6,079	40.91	909	
Champhai	23	Champhai North	H. Ginzalala	ZPM	7,134	43.63	Z. R. Thiamsanga	MNF	6,424	39.28	710	
Champhai	24	Champhai South	Clement Lalhmingthanga	ZPM	7,323	42.16	T. J. Lalnuntluanga	MNF	6,994	40.27	329	
Champhai	25	East Tuipui	Ramthanmawia	MNF	6,075	47.11	C. Lalrammawia	ZPM	5,915	45.87	160	
Serchhip	26	Serchhip	Lalduhoma	ZPM	8,314	45.86	J. Malsawmzuala Vanchhawng	MNF	5,332	29.41	2,982	
Serchhip	27	Tuikum	P. C. Vanlalruata	ZPM	7,136	47.58	Er. Lalrinnawma	MNF	4,975	33.17	2,161	
Serchhip	28	Hrangturzo	Lalmuanpuia Punte	ZPM	6,280	44.92	Lalremruata Chhangte	MNF	5,025	35.94	1,255	
Lunglei	29	South Tuipui	Jeje Lalpekhlua	ZPM	5,468	39.57	R. Lalthangliana	MNF	5,333	38.59	135	
Lunglei	30	Lunglei North	V. Malsawmtluanga	ZPM	7,369	48.02	Vanlaltanpuia	MNF	5,394	35.15	1,975	
Lunglei	31	Lunglei East	Lalrinpuii	ZPM	5,641	41.53	Joseph Lalhimpuia	INC	3,995	29.41	1,646	
Lunglei	32	Lunglei West	T. Lalhlimpuia	ZPM	5,029	38.60	C. Lalrinsanga	MNF	3,747	28.76	1,282	
Lunglei	33	Lunglei South	Lalramliana Papuia	ZPM	6,531	40.81	K. Pachhunga	MNF	5,305	33.15	1,226	
Lunglei	34	Thorang	R. Rohmingliana	MNF	4,141	31.24	Zodintluanga	INC	4,079	30.77	62	
Lunglei	35	West Tuipui	Prova Chakma	MNF	7,167	48.62	Nihar Kanti Chakma	INC	6,456	43.80	711	
Lawngtlai	36	Tuichawng	Rasik Mohan Chakma	MNF	13,346	44.55	Durjya Dhan Chakma	BJP	12,695	42.38	651	
Lawngtlai	37	Lawngtlai West	C. Ngunlianchunga	INC	11,296	45.30	V. Zirsanga	MNF	10,864	43.57	432	
Lawngtlai	38	Lawngtlai East	L. L. Chinzah	ZPM	10,072	49.66	H. Biakzaua	MNF	7,971	39.30	2,101	
Saiha	39	Saiha	K. Beichhua	BJP	6,740	35.83	H.C. Lalmalsawma Zasai	MNF	6,124	32.56	616	
Saiha	40	Palak	Pushpa K. Hrahmo	BJP	6,064	37.80	K. T. Rokhaw	MNF	4,823	30.06	1,241	
