= List of speakers of the Mizoram Legislative Assembly =

Presiding officer of the Mizoram Legislative Assembly

Speaker of The Mizoram Legislative Assembly
- Seal of the state of Mizoram

- Flag of India
- Incumbent; Lalbiakzama since 12 December 2023
- Mizoram Legislative Assembly
- Style: The Hon’ble (formal); Speaker (informal)
- Member of: Mizoram Legislative Assembly
- Reports to: Government of Mizoram
- Seat: Mizoram Legislative Assembly
- Appointer: Members of the Mizoram Legislative Assembly
- Term length: During the life of the vidhan Sabha (five years maximum)
- Constituting instrument: Article 93 of the Constitution of India
- Formation: 10 May 1972; 54 years ago
- Deputy: Lalfamkima
- Website: -

The Speaker of the Mizoram Legislative Assembly is the title given to the presiding officer (chair) of the Mizoram Legislative Assembly. The Speaker's official role is to moderate debate, make rulings on procedure, announce the results of votes, etc. The Speaker decides who may speak and has the powers to discipline members who break the procedures of the Assembly. The Speaker often also represents the body in person, as the voice of the body in ceremonial and some other situations. Many bodies also have a speaker pro tempore or deputy speaker, designated to fill in when the speaker is not available.

== Role in the Legislative Assembly ==
The Speaker presides over the sessions of the Legislative Assembly and conducts the business in the Assembly. He decides whether a bill is a money bill or a non-money bill. He maintains discipline and decorum in the Assembly and can punish a member for their unruly behaviour by suspending them. He permits the moving of various kinds of motions and resolutions like the motion of no confidence, motion of adjournment, motion of censure and calling attention notice as per the rules. The Speaker decides on the agenda to be taken up for discussion during the meeting. The date of election of the Speaker is fixed by the Governor.

Although the members of the Legislative Assembly represent their constituencies, the Speaker represents the whole Assembly.

While the office of Speaker is vacant, the duties of the office are performed by the Deputy Speaker or, if the office of Deputy Speaker is also vacant, by such member of the Assembly as the Governor may appoint for the purpose.

During the absence of the Speaker from any sitting of the Assembly the Deputy Speaker or, if he is also absent, such person as may be determined by the Assembly, or, if no such person is present, such other person as may be determined by the Assembly, shall act as Speaker.

== Election of the Speaker ==
In the Legislative Assembly, a simple majority vote in the Assembly in which all present members participate determine both the Speaker and the Deputy Speaker — the presiding officers — who are also its members.

The party in power proposes the name of their candidate after its candidate after titular hearings with Leaders of other Parties who are a part of the Assembly. This ensures that the Speaker is accepted by all political Parties belonging to the Assembly. The name of the candidate determined by the party in power is usually proposed by the Chief Minister or the Minister of Parliamentary Affairs. The pro-tem Speaker chairs the session in which the election for the post of the Speaker takes place.

The Deputy Speaker chairs sessions where the election takes place towards the end of Legislative Assembly. Once the election is over, the person who is presiding declares the chosen candidate to be Speaker of the Assembly, without latter motions being voted upon. Once the final tally of votes is declared, the Chief Minister and Leader of the Opposition escort the Speaker elect to the Chair. His speech, in which he thanks the Assembly, marks the start of the tenure of the new Speaker.

== Term of office ==
The term of office of the Speaker ranges from the day he is elected to the dissolution of the Legislative Assembly. When the Assembly is dissolved, the Speaker terminates his tenure as a member of the Assembly, but does not quit his position as Speaker. He stands eligible for re-election.

A member holding office as Speaker or Deputy Speaker of an Assembly shall vacate his office if his tenure as member of the Assembly is terminated; or may at any time by writing under his hand addressed, if such members is the Speaker, to the Deputy Speaker, and if such member is the Deputy Speaker, to the Speaker, resign his office; and may be removed from his office by a resolution of the Assembly provided that no resolution shall be moved unless at least fourteen days' notice has been given.

Further, whenever the Assembly is dissolved, the speaker shall not vacate his office until immediately prior to the Legislation Assembly's first meeting after the dissolution.

At any sitting of the Legislative Assembly, while any resolution for the removal of the Speaker from his office is under consideration, the Speaker, or while any resolution for the removal of the Deputy Speaker from his office is under consideration, the Deputy Speaker, shall not, though he is present, preside, and during the absence of the Speaker from any sitting of the Assembly the Deputy Speaker in relation to every such sitting as they apply in relation to a sitting from which the Speaker or, as the case may be, the Deputy Speaker, is absent.

The Speaker shall have the right to speak and take part in discussions in the Legislative Assembly while any resolution for his removal from office is under consideration in the Assembly and shall be entitled to vote only in the first instance on such resolution or on any other matter during such proceedings but not in the case of an equality of votes.

== List of speakers ==
#	Name	Constituency	Tenure			Assembly	Party
#	Name	Constituency	Term starts	Term ends	Term	Assembly	Party
1	H. Thansanga	Suangpuilwan	10 May 1972	17 October 1975	3 years, 160 days	1st	Independent
2	Vaivenga	Serchhip	7 November 1975	20 June 1978	2 years, 225 days	1st	Independent
3	Thingridema	Hnahthial	21 June 1978	24 May 1979	337 days	2nd	Mizoram People's Conference
4	Kenneth Chawngliana	Kawnpui	25 May 1979	8 May 1984	4 years, 349 days	3rd	Mizoram People's Conference
(1)	H. Thansanga	Suangpuilawn	9 May 1984	9 March 1987	2 years, 304 days	4th	Indian National Congress
5	J. Thanghuama	Lokicherra	10 March 1987	29 January 1989	1 year, 325 days	1st	Independent
6	Hiphei	Tuipang	30 January 1989	14 July 1990	1 year, 165 days	2nd	Indian National Congress
7	Rokamlova	Aizawl East 2	17 July 1990	9 December 1993	3 years, 145 days	2nd	Indian National Congress
(2)	Vaivenga	Bilkhawthlir	10 December 1993	7 December 1998	4 years, 362 days	3rd	Indian National Congress
8	R. Lalawia	North Vanlaiphai	8 December 1998	3 December 2003	4 years, 360 days	4th	Mizo National Front
9	Lalchamliana	Bilkhawthlir	15 December 2003	10 December 2008	4 years, 361 days	5th	Mizo National Front
10	R. Romawia	Aizawl North 1	16 December 2008	15 December 2013	4 years, 364 days	6th	Indian National Congress
(6)	Hiphei	Palak	16 December 2013	5 November 2018	4 years, 324 days	7th	Indian National Congress
11	Lalrinliana Sailo	Chalfilh	18 December 2018	12 December 2023	4 years, 359 days	8th	Mizo National Front
12	Lalbiakzama	Chalfilh	12 December 2023	Incumbent	2 years, 269 days	9th	Zoram People's Movement

== List of Deputy Speakers ==
#	Name	Constituency	Tenure			Assembly	Party
#	Name	Constituency	Term starts	Term ends	Term	Assembly	Party
?	R. Lalrinawma	Aizawl East 1	19 December 2013	5 November 2018	4 years, 321 days	7th	Indian National Congress
?	Lalrinawma	Tuikum	20 December 2018	17 December 2022	3 years, 362 days	8th	Mizo National Front
?	H. Biakzaua	Lawngtlai East	8 February 2023	12 November 2023	277 days	8th	Mizo National Front
?	Lalfamkima	Kolasib	15 December 2023	Incumbent	2 years, 266 days	9th	Zoram People's Movement

== Pro tem Speaker ==
=== List of Pro tem Speakers ===
Lalfamkima 2018 and 2023
