= Lalfamkima =

Zoram People's Movement politician from Mizoram

- Official portrait, 2024

Deputy Speaker of the Mizoram Legislative Assembly
- Incumbent
- Assumed office 15 December 2023
- Governor: V. K. Singh
- Chief Minister: Lalduhoma
- Speaker: Lalbiakzama
- Preceded by: H. Biakzaua

Personal details
- Born: 5 December 1966 (age 59)
- Party: Zoram People's Movement
- Occupation: Politician

Lalfamkima (born 5 December 1966) is an Indian politician from Mizoram. Representing the Zoram People's Movement, he is the current Deputy Speaker of Mizoram Legislative Assembly.

== Early life and education ==
Lalfamkima was born on 5 December 1966. He has completed his education up to Bachelor of Arts from North-Eastern Hill University in 1995.

== Political career ==
In the 2023 legislative election, Lalfamkima was elected to the Mizoram Legislative Assembly from Kolasib Assembly constituency as candidate of Zoram People's Movement. He was then elected Deputy Speaker of the Mizoram Legislative Assembly.
