= Lorrain Lalpekliana Chinzah =

Indian politician (born 1981)

Member of the Mizoram Legislative Assembly for Lawngtlai East Assembly constituency
- Incumbent
- Assumed office December 2023
- Preceded by: H. Biakzaua

Personal details
- Born: 15 November 1981 (age 44)
- Party: Zoram People's Movement (since 2017)
- Parent: Rev. C. Vanlawma (father)
- Education: MBBS
- Alma mater: Gauhati Medical College and Hospital

Lorrain Lalpekliana Chinzah (born 1981) is an Indian politician in the state of Mizoram. He is serving as adviser to chief minister on health & family welfare, and agriculture.

== Political career ==
He was elected as a member of the Mizoram Legislative Assembly from the Lawngtlai East constituency of Lawngtlai district. In the 2023 Mizoram Legislative Assembly elections he defeated sitting MLA H. Biakzaua by a huge margin of 2,101 votes.

He contested as a Zoram People's Movement candidate and won the Lawngtlai East seat. He was an independent member of the Lai Autonomous District Council before he joined the ZPM.

== Education ==
Lorrain completed his MBBS from Gauhati Medical College and Hospital in 2010.
