= Lalrinsanga Ralte =

Indian politician

Member of the Mizoram Legislative Assembly

Lalrinsanga Ralte (born 26 May 1978) is an Indian politician from Mizoram. He is a member of the Mizoram Legislative Assembly from the Serlui Assembly constituency, which is reserved for Scheduled Tribe community, in Kolasib district. He was elected in the 2023 Mizoram Legislative Assembly election, representing the Mizo National Front.

== Early life and education ==
Ralte is from Dinthar Veng, Aizwal, Mizoram. He is the son of Rosanga Ralte. He married Lalhminghlui and they have three children. He completed his Bachelor of Arts in 2001 at Aizawl West College, Aizawl, which is affiliated with North Eastern Hills University. He declared assets of Rs.57 lakhs to the Election Commission of India, before the election.

== Career ==
Ralte won the Serlui Assembly constituency representing the Mizo National Front in the 2023 Mizoram Legislative Assembly election. He polled 7,242 votes and defeated his nearest rival, Lalhmachhuana of the Indian National Congress, by a margin of 906 votes. He started his political journey as a student leader and first became an MLA in 2018. He won the 2018 Mizoram Legislative Assembly election from the Serlui Assembly constituency on the Mizo National Front ticket and defeated his nearest rival, Lalhmachhuana of the Indian National Congress party by a margin of 927 votes.
