= V. L. Zaithanzama =

Indian politician

Member of the Mizoram Legislative Assembly

V. L. Zaithanzama (born 30 July 1958) is an Indian politician from Mizoram. He is an MLA from the Aizwal West 3 Assembly constituency, which is reserved for Scheduled Tribe community in Aizwal district. He won the 2023 Mizoram Legislative Assembly election, representing the Zoram People's Movement.

== Early life and education ==
Zaithanzama is from Sialhawk, Champhai District, Mizoram. He is the son of the late V.L. Siama. He completed Class 10 in 1978 at Mizo High School, Shillong.

== Career ==
Zaithanzama was elected from the Aizwal West 3 Assembly constituency representing the Zoram People's Movement in the 2023 Mizoram Legislative Assembly election. He polled 9,202 votes and defeated his nearest rival, K. Lalsawmvela of the Mizo National Front, by a margin of 4,582 votes. He first became an MLA winning the 2018 Mizoram Legislative Assembly election defeating Vanlalzawma of the MNF, by a margin of 1026 votes.
