= C. Ngunlianchunga =

Indian politician (born 1960)

Member of Mizoram Legislative Assembly
- Incumbent
- Assumed office 2013
- Preceded by: C. Ramlunha
- Constituency: Lawngtlai West

Personal details
- Born: 22 September 1960 (age 65)
- Party: Indian National Congress

C. Ngunlianchunga (born 22 September 1960) is an Indian politician from Mizoram. He is a three-time consecutive member of the Mizoram Legislative Assembly from the Lawngtlai West constituency of Lawngtlai district. He was elected in the 2023 Mizoram Legislative Assembly election representing the Indian National Congress.

== Early life and education ==
Ngunlianchunga was born in Lawngtlai and currently resides at Tuikhuahtlang, Aizawl. He studied Class 8 at the Government Regional High School, Lawngtlai, Mizoram and passed the examinations in 1976. He later discontinued his studies and became a businessman. He declared assets worth Rs. 5.9 crore in his election declaration to the Election Commission of India. He married K.R. Chhingpuii and together they have two children.

== Career ==
Ngunlianchunga was elected from the Lawngtlai West Assembly constituency representing the Indian National Congress in the 2023 Mizoram Legislative Assembly election. He polled 11,296 votes and defeated his nearest rival, Zirsanga of the Mizo National Front, by a margin of 432 votes. He became an MLA for the first time winning the 2013 Mizoram Legislative Assembly election and retained the seat for the Indian National Congress in the 2018 Mizoram Legislative Assembly election. In 2018, he defeated C. Ramhluna of the Mizo National Front, by a margin of 796 votes.
