= Lalchhuanthanga =

Indian politician (born 1957)

Member of the Mizoram Legislative Assembly

Lalchhuanthanga (born 8 August 1957) is an Indian politician from Mizoram. He is an MLA from Aizwal South 2 Assembly constituency, which is reserved for Scheduled Tribe community, in Aizawl district. He won the 2023 Mizoram Legislative Assembly election, representing the Zoram People's Movement.

== Early life and education ==
Lalchhuanthanga was born in Tlangnuam, Aizawl, Mizoram. He is the son of D. Buanga. He married Lalliankimi and they have four children. He completed his B.A. in 1999 at North-Eastern Hill University.

== Career ==
Lalchhuanthanga was elected from the Aizwal South 2 Assembly constituency representing the Zoram People's Movement in the 2023 Mizoram Legislative Assembly election. He polled 9,117 votes and defeated his nearest rival, Lalmalsawma Nghaka of the Indian National Congress, by a margin of 1,639 votes. He first became an MLA winning the 2018 Mizoram Legislative Assembly election defeating Lalmalsawma Nghaka of the Indian National Congress, by a margin of 179 votes.
