= Ramthanmawia =

Indian politician

Member of the Mizoram Legislative Assembly

Ramthanmawia (born 25 February 1957) is an Indian politician from Mizoram. He is an MLA from the East Tuipui Assembly constituency, which is reserved for Scheduled Tribes, in Champhai District. He won the 2023 Mizoram Legislative Assembly election, representing the Mizo National Front.

== Early life and education ==
Ramthanmawia is from Aizawl District, Mizoram. He is the son of the late Sena. He married Lalchawithangi and they have five children. He completed his diploma in Radio Electronics Engineering in 1980 at the B. R. C. Radio Institute, Rangoon, Burma.

== Career ==
Ramthanmawia was elected from the East Tuipui Assembly constituency representing the Mizo National Front in the 2023 Mizoram Legislative Assembly election. He polled 6,075 votes and defeated his nearest rival, C. Lalrammawia of the Zoram People's Movement, by a margin of 160 votes. He first became an MLA winning the 2018 Mizoram Legislative Assembly election, defeating C. Lalthanpuia of the Zoram People's Movement, by a margin of 587 votes.
