= Zosiama Pachuau =

Indian politician

Zosiama Pachuau (15 August 1944 – 25 January 2017) was an Indian politician and member of the Mizoram People's Conference. Pachuau was a member of the Mizoram Legislative Assembly from the Kolasib constituency in Kolasib district. He served as minister of Education. He was a teacher by profession and a member of the Mizoram Board of School Education as chief academic officer before joining politics.
