= P. C. Vanlalruata =

Indian politician

P.C.Vanlalruata
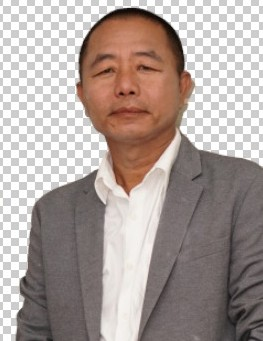
- Official portrait of Vanlalruata

Minister of Agriculture of Mizoram
- Incumbent
- Assumed office 8 December 2023
- Governor: Kambhampati Hari Babu; V. K. Singh
- Chief Minister: Lalduhoma
- Preceded by: C Lalrinsanga

Minister of Co-operation of Mizoram
- Incumbent
- Assumed office 8 December 2023
- Governor: Kambhampati Hari Babu; V. K. Singh
- Chief Minister: Lalduhoma
- Preceded by: C Lalrinsanga

Minister of Irrigation and Water Resources of Mizoram
- Incumbent
- Assumed office 8 December 2023
- Governor: Kambhampati Hari Babu; V. K. Singh
- Chief Minister: Lalduhoma
- Preceded by: C Lalrinsanga

Member of the Mizoram Legislative Assembly
- Incumbent
- Assumed office December 2023
- Preceded by: Lalrinawma
- Constituency: Tuikum

Personal details
- Born: 28 August 1973 (age 52) Chhingchhip, Mizoram
- Party: Zoram People's Movement (since 2017)
- Spouse: Vanlalenghluni
- Children: 1
- Parent: P.C. Rinthanga (father)
- Education: MA (Economics)
- Alma mater: North-Eastern Hill University

P. C. Vanlalruata is an Indian politician from Mizoram, who is currently the Cabinet Minister for Agriculture, Irrigation & Water Resources Cooperation Department for the Government of Mizoram.

He was elected to the Mizoram Legislative Assembly for the Tuikum Assembly constituency in the 2023 general election as a candidate for the Zoram People's Movement.

== Education ==
P. C. Vanlalruata completed his Post Graduate degree in MA (Economics) from North-Eastern Hill University in 1999.
