= Lalbiakzama =

Zoram People's Movement politician from Mizoram

- Official Portrait

15th Speaker of the Mizoram Legislative Assembly
- Incumbent
- Assumed office 12 December 2023
- Chief Minister: Lalduhoma
- Deputy Spekar: Lalfamkima
- Preceded by: Lalrinliana Sailo

Personal details
- Born: 1 January 1965 (age 61)
- Party: Zoram People's Movement
- Other political affiliations: Mizoram People's Conference
- Parent: L.T Zauva (father)
- Education: B.Com
- Occupation: Politician

Lalbiakzama is a Zoram People's Movement politician and 15th current Speaker of Mizoram Legislative Assembly from 2023. He had been elected to the Mizoram Legislative Assembly from the Chalfilh Assembly constituency as candidate of the Zoram People's Movement.

== Education ==
He obtained his Bachelor of Commerce degree from North-Eastern Hill University in 1998.
