= Clement Lalhmingthanga =

Indian politician

Member of the Mizoram Legislative Assembly

Clement Lalhmingthanga (born 24 November 1965) is an Indian politician from Mizoram. He is an MLA from the Champhai South Assembly constituency, which is reserved for Scheduled Tribe community, in Champhai district. He won the 2023 Mizoram Legislative Assembly election, representing the Zoram People's Movement.

== Early life and education ==
Lalhmingthanga is from Aizwal, Mizoram. He is the son of Thanzauva. He completed his B.A. at Jawaharlal Nehru University, Delhi. He is a retired lieutenant colonel in the Indian Army. His wife is an engineer in Mizo government service.

== Career ==
Lalhmingthanga won the Champhai South Assembly constituency representing the Zoram People's Movement in the 2023 Mizoram Legislative Assembly election. He polled 7,323 votes and defeated his nearest rival, T. J. Lalnuntluanga of the Mizo National Front, by a margin of 329 votes.
