= T. Lalhlimpuia =

Indian politician

Member of the Mizoram Legislative Assembly
- Incumbent
- Assumed office 2023
- Constituency: Lunglei West

Personal details
- Born: 1977 (age 48–49) Lunglei West, Mizoram, India
- Party: Zoram People's Movement
- Parent: Hrangvunga (father)
- Education: Savitribai Phule Pune University (M.A. Economics, 2000)
- Occupation: Politician

T. Lalhlimpuia (born 1977) is an Indian politician from Mizoram. He is an MLA from the Lunglei West Assembly constituency, which is reserved for Scheduled Tribe community, in Lunglei district. He won the 2023 Mizoram Legislative Assembly election, representing the Zoram People's Movement.

== Early life and education ==
Lalhlimpuia is from Lunglei West, Mizoram. He is the son of Hrangvunga. He completed his M.A. in economics in 2000 at Pune University. His wife is an associate professor at the Lunglei Government College.

== Career ==
Lalhlimpuia won the Lunglei West Assembly constituency representing the Zoram People's Movement in the 2023 Mizoram Legislative Assembly election. He polled 5,029 votes and defeated his nearest rival, C. Lalrinsanga of the Mizo National Front, by a margin of 1,282 votes.
