= Mamit Assembly constituency =

Constituency of the Mizoram legislative assembly in India

Coordinates: 23.92°N 92.49°E

Mamit
- Constituency No. 3 for the Mizoram Legislative Assembly
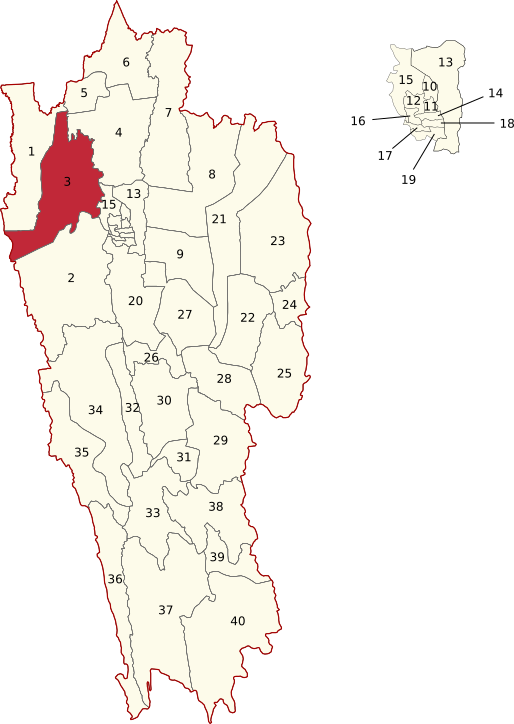

Constituency details
- Country: India
- Region: Northeast India
- State: Mizoram
- District: Mamit
- Lok Sabha constituency: Mizoram
- Established: 1987
- Total electors: 19,739
- Reservation: ST

Member of Legislative Assembly
- 9th Mizoram Legislative Assembly
- Incumbent H. Lalzirliana
- Party: Mizo National Front
- Elected year: 2023

Mamit is one of the 40 Legislative Assembly constituencies of Mizoram state in India.

It is part of Mamit district and is reserved for candidates belonging to the Scheduled Tribes.

== Members of the Legislative Assembly ==
Year	Member	Party
1987	K. Zahungliana	Mizo National Front
1989	Lalthuthanga	Indian National Congress
1993	Lalthuthanga	Indian National Congress
1998	T. Sailo	Mizoram People's Conference
2003	Lalthlengliana	Mizo National Front
2008	John Rotluangliana	Indian National Congress
2013	John Rotluangliana	Indian National Congress
2018	H. Lalzirliana	Mizo National Front

== Election results ==
=== 2023 ===
2023 Mizoram Legislative Assembly election: Mamit
Party	Candidate	Votes	%	±%
MNF	H. Lalzirliana	7,167	34.90	
INC	K. Lalthanzama	5,375	26.17	
ZPM	H. Zorempuia	5,359	26.09	
BJP	Lalrinliana Sailo	2,454	11.95	
NOTA	None of the Above	95	0.46	
Majority		1,792	8.73	
Turnout				
MNF hold		Swing		

=== 2018 ===
2018 Mizoram Legislative Assembly election: Mamit
Party	Candidate	Votes	%	±%
MNF	H. Lalzirliana	6,874	35.39	▲4.20
INC	John Rotluangliana	6467	33.29	▼12.52
BJP	Malsawmtluanga	4528	23.31	▲22.72
ZPM	C. Zothansanga	1122	5.78	▼1.83
NPP	Lianzuala	90	0.46	New
NCP	Lalawmpuia Chhangte	80	0.41	▼13.50
Independent	B. Lalhmunzawnga	75	0.39	New
NOTA	None of the Above	190	0.98	▲0.28
Majority		407	2.12	
Turnout		19,426	82.05	▼4.00
MNF gain from INC		Swing		

=== 2013 ===
2013 Mizoram Legislative Assembly election: Mamit
Party	Candidate	Votes	%	±%
INC	John Rotluangliana	7,798	45.81	▲13.83
MNF	H. B. Lianmunga	5308	31.19	▲14.74
NCP	Biakthuama Molshoy	2368	13.91	▲13.14
ZNP	Lalrimawia	1296	7.61	▼7.62
BJP	R. Laltawnliana	100	0.59	▼1.09
NOTA	None of the Above	151	0.89	New
Majority		2490	14.76	
Turnout		17021	86.05	▲1.15
INC hold		Swing		

=== 2008 ===
2008 Mizoram Legislative Assembly election: Mamit
Party	Candidate	Votes	%	±%
INC	John Rotluangliana	4,421	31.98	
MNF	Lalthlengliana	2274	16.45	
Independent	Lallawmsanga Apetow	2211	15.99	
ZNP	Laltanpuia	2106	15.23	
Independent	Lalromawia	1893	13.69	
Independent	R. Lalhmunmawia	366	2.65	
BJP	Lalhluna	232	1.68	
NCP	Mathew Lalnunpuia	107	0.77	
LB	Suresbihari	89	0.64	
LJP	M. Zarzoliana	68	0.49	
JD(U)	T. Lalsanga	57	0.41	
Majority		2147	15.53	
Turnout		13824	84.9	
INC gain from MNF		Swing		

=== 2003 ===
2003 Mizoram Legislative Assembly election: Mamit
Party	Candidate	Votes	%	±%
MNF	Lalthlengliana	2,805	35.1	
INC	John Rotluangliana	2,638	33.1	
MPC	K. L. Berema	2,494	31.2	
JD(U)	Hauliana	46	0.6	
Majority		167	2.1	
Turnout		7,986	80.9	
MNF gain from MPC		Swing	3.9	
