= Lalramliana Papuia =

Indian politician (born 1974)

Member of the Mizoram Legislative Assembly

Lalramliana Papuia (born 22 September 1974) is an Indian politician from the state of Mizoram. He is a first time member of the Mizoram Legislative Assembly from the Lunglei South Assembly constituency which is reserved for the Scheduled Tribe community in Lunglei district in the 2023 Mizoram Legislative Assembly elections. He defeated sitting MLA K. Pachhunga by a margin of 1,226 votes.

== Early life and education ==
Papuia is from Salem Veng, Lunglei district, Mizoram, India. He is the son of Zairemkunga. He completed his Master of Arts in political science at the Savitribai Phule University of Pune in the year 2001. He married Lalrinzuali Pachuau, a government middle school teacher. Together, they have three children. He is self-employed and declared assets worth Rs. 99.8 lakhs in his election affidavit to the Election Commission of India before the election.

== Career ==
Papuia made his electoral debut and was first elected as an MLA winning the Lunglei South Assembly constituency in the 2023 Mizoram Legislative Assembly election. He contested as a Zoram People Movement (ZPM) candidate and polled 6,531 votes, defeating his nearest rival and sitting MLA, K. Pachhunga, a doctor from the Mizo National Front, who got 5,305 votes. He won by a margin of 1,226 votes and garnered a vote share of 40.81 per cent.

Before becoming an MLA, he was a news presenter with All India Radio for 17 years and a member of the village council for four consecutive terms. He also served in the Young Mizo Association, the largest NGO in Mizoram, for four years.
