= Kolasib Assembly constituency =

Constituency of the Mizoram legislative assembly in India

Coordinates: 24.22°N 92.68°E

Kolasib
- Constituency No. 5 for the Mizoram Legislative Assembly
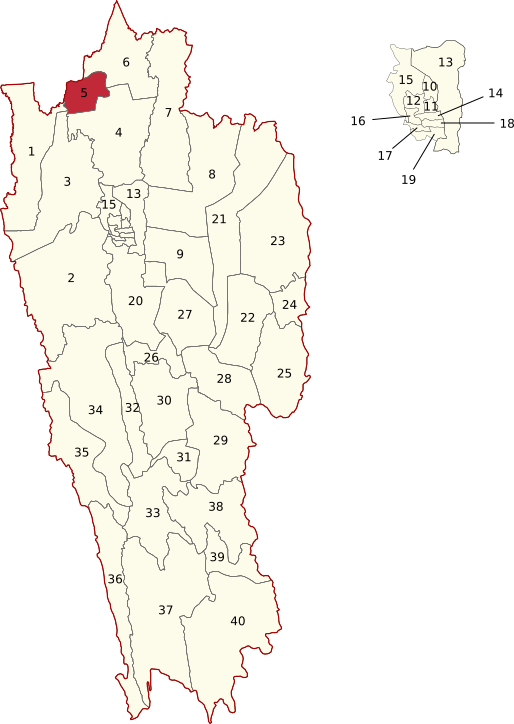

Constituency details
- Country: India
- Region: Northeast India
- State: Mizoram
- District: Kolasib
- Lok Sabha constituency: Mizoram
- Established: 1972
- Total electors: 18,934
- Reservation: ST

Member of Legislative Assembly
- 9th Mizoram Legislative Assembly
- Incumbent Lalfamkima
- Party: Zoram People's Movement
- Elected year: 2023

Kolasib is one of the 40 Legislative Assembly constituencies of Mizoram state in India.

It is part of Kolasib district and is reserved for candidates belonging to the Scheduled Tribes.

== Members of the Legislative Assembly ==
Year	Member	Party
1972	C. Chhunga	Mizo Union
1978	Chawngkunga	MPC
1979	Chawngkunga	MPC
1984	Zalawma	INC
1987	Aichhinga	MNF
1989	Aichhinga	MNF
1993	Zosiama Pachuau	Independent
1998	Rualchhina	MNF
2003	Zoramthanga	MNF
2008	PC Zoramsangliana	INC
2013	PC Zoramsangliana	INC
2018	K. Lalrinliana	MNF
2023	Lalfamkima	ZPM

== Election results ==
=== 2023 ===
2023 Mizoram Legislative Assembly election: Kolasib
Party	Candidate	Votes	%	±%
MNF	K. Lalrinliana			
ZPM	Lalfamkima			
INC	S. Lalrinawma			
BJP	R. Lalthangliana			
NOTA	None of the Above			
Majority				
Turnout				
		Swing		

=== 2018 ===
2018 Mizoram Legislative Assembly election: Kolasib
Party	Candidate	Votes	%	±%
MNF	K. Lalrinliana	5,940	33.34	▼0.99
ZPM	Lalfamkima	5661	31.77	▲5.92
INC	Ngurdingliana	5232	29.36	▼8.70
BJP	B. Lianthlira	504	2.83	▲1.83
NPP	John Lalremruata	288	1.62	New
PRISM	Zodinsanga	80	0.45	New
NOTA	None of the Above	114	0.64	▼0.12
Majority		279	1.58	
Turnout		17,819	81.84	▼4.00
MNF gain from INC		Swing		

=== 2013 ===
2013 Mizoram Legislative Assembly election: Kolasib
Party	Candidate	Votes	%	±%
INC	Zoramsangliana	6,078	38.06	▼2.86
MNF	Lalchamliana	5483	34.33	▲1.19
ZNP	Lalduhoma	4128	25.85	New
BJP	Ramfangzauvi	159	1.00	▲0.06
NOTA	None of the Above	122	0.76	New
Majority		595	3.75	
Turnout		15970	83.85	▲0.25
INC hold		Swing		

=== 2008 ===
2008 Mizoram Legislative Assembly election: Kolasib
Party	Candidate	Votes	%	±%
INC	Zoramsangliana	5,510	40.92	
MNF	K. Lalrinliana	4462	33.14	
MPC	Lalrawna Sailo	2805	20.83	
Independent	Lalfamkima	471	3.50	
BJP	Ramfangzauvi	126	0.94	
LJP	R. Lalrinawmi	91	0.68	
Majority		1048	7.78	
Turnout		13465	84.1	
INC gain from MNF		Swing		

== See also ==
- Kolasib
- Mizoram
- Mizoram (Lok Sabha constituency)
