= Lawngtlai West Assembly constituency =

Constituency of the Mizoram legislative assembly in India

Coordinates: 22.163°N 92.806°E

Lawngtlai West
- Constituency No. 37 for the Mizoram Legislative Assembly
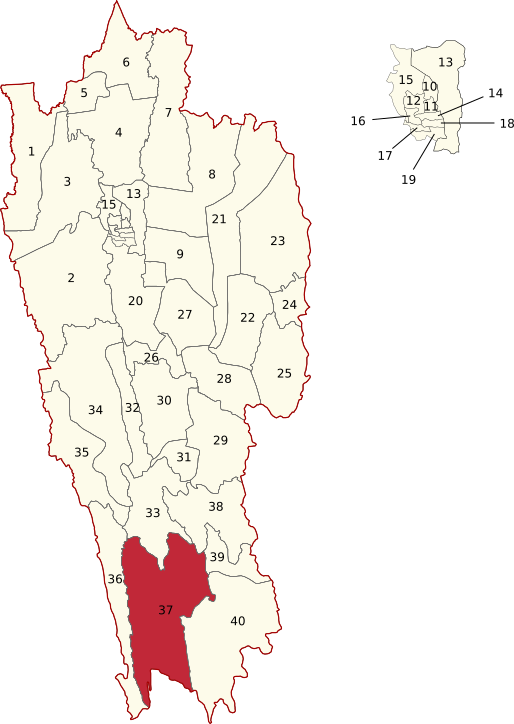

Constituency details
- Country: India
- Region: Northeast India
- State: Mizoram
- District: Lawngtlai
- Lok Sabha constituency: Mizoram
- Established: 2008
- Total electors: 29,542
- Reservation: ST

Member of Legislative Assembly
- 9th Mizoram Legislative Assembly
- Incumbent C. Ngunlianchunga
- Party: Indian National Congress
- Elected year: 2023

Lawngtlai West is one of the 40 Legislative Assembly constituencies of Mizoram state in India. It was established in 2008 after the passing of the Delimitation of Parliamentary and Assembly Constituencies Order, 2008.

It is part of Lawngtlai district, and is reserved for candidates belonging to the Scheduled Tribes. As of 2023, it is represented by C. Ngunlianchunga of the Indian National Congress party.

== Members of the Legislative Assembly ==
Year	Name	Party
2008	C. Ramlunha	Mizo National Front
2013	C. Ngunlianchunga	Indian National Congress
2018	C. Ngunlianchunga	Indian National Congress
2023	C. Ngunlianchunga	Indian National Congress

== Election results ==
=== 2023 ===
2023 Mizoram Legislative Assembly election: Lawngtlai West
Party	Candidate	Votes	%	±%
INC	C. Ngunlianchunga	11,296	45.30	▼3.57
MNF	V. Zirsanga	10,864	43.57	
ZPM	Lalnunsema	2,312	9.27	
BJP	J. B. Rualchhinga	319	1.28	
NOTA	None of the Above	81	0.28	
Majority		432	1.37	
Turnout		24,856	42.1	
INC hold		Swing		

=== 2018 ===
2018 Mizoram Legislative Assembly election: Lawngtlai West
Party	Candidate	Votes	%	±%
INC	C. Ngunlianchunga	10,678	49.18	
MNF	C. Ramhluna	9,883	45.52	
BJP	J. B. Rualchhinga	973	4.48	
Independent	Vanlalthaa	177	0.82	
NOTA	None of the Above	136		
Majority		795	3.7	
Turnout		21,711	86.4	
INC hold		Swing		

=== 2013 ===
2013 Mizoram Legislative Assembly election: Lawngtlai West
Party	Candidate	Votes	%	±%
INC	C. Ngunlianchunga	10,323	53.13	
MNF	C. Ramhluna	8,788	45.23	
ZNP	Mc. Lalramchhana	320	1.65	
NOTA	None of the Above	150		
Majority		1,535	7.9	
Turnout		19,431	84.4	
INC gain from MNF		Swing		

=== 2008 ===
2008 Mizoram Legislative Assembly election: Lawngtlai West
Party	Candidate	Votes	%	±%
MNF	C. Ramhluna	6,086	35.97	
INC	L. H. Chhuanawma	5,286	31.24	
Independent	H. Vanlalthaliana	2,625	15.52	
Independent	J. B. Rualchhinga	2,413	14.26	
BJP	F. Hrangkhuma	273	1.61	
LJP	Lalremruata	235	1.39	
Majority		800	4.7	
Turnout		16,918	84.8	
MNF win (new seat)				
