= East Tuipui Assembly constituency =

Constituency of the Mizoram legislative assembly in India

Coordinates: 23.245°N 93.250°E

East Tuipui
- Constituency No. 25 for the Mizoram Legislative Assembly
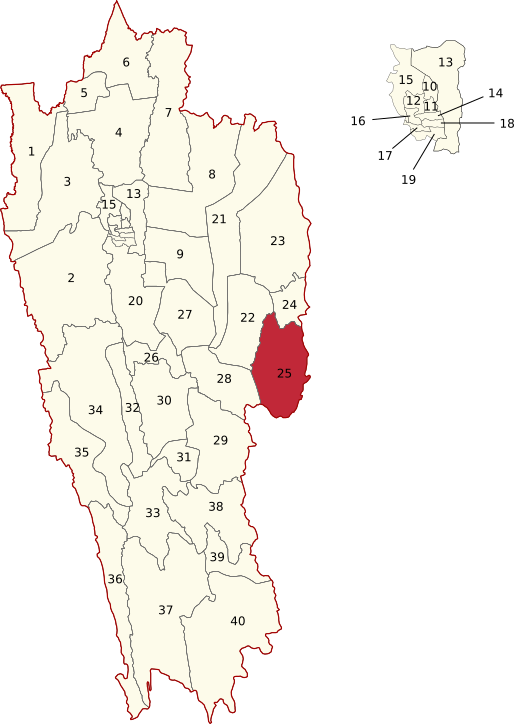

Constituency details
- Country: India
- Region: Northeast India
- State: Mizoram
- District: Champhai
- Lok Sabha constituency: Mizoram
- Established: 2008
- Total electors: 13,825
- Reservation: ST

Member of Legislative Assembly
- 9th Mizoram Legislative Assembly
- Incumbent Ramthanmawia
- Party: Mizo National Front
- Elected year: 2023

East Tuipui is one of the 40 Legislative Assembly constituencies of Mizoram state in India. It is part of Champhai district and is reserved for candidates belonging to the Scheduled Tribes.

== Members of the Legislative Assembly ==
Election	Name	Party
2008	B. Lalthlengliana	Mizo National Front
2013	T. Sangkunga	Indian National Congress
2018	Ramthanmawia	Mizo National Front
2023	Ramthanmawia	Mizo National Front

== Election results ==
=== 2023 ===
2023 Mizoram Legislative Assembly election: East Tuipui
Party	Candidate	Votes	%	±%
MNF	Ramthanmawia	6,075	47.11	
ZPM	Dr. C. Lalrammawia	5,915	45.87	
INC	C. Lalnunthanga	869	6.74	
NOTA	None of the Above	36	0.28	
Majority		160	1.24	
Turnout				
MNF hold		Swing		

=== 2018 ===
2018 Mizoram Legislative Assembly election: East Tuipui
Party	Candidate	Votes	%	±%
MNF	Ramthanmawia			
NOTA	None of the Above			
Majority				
Turnout				
MNF hold		Swing		
