= Lunglei South Assembly constituency =

Constituency of the Mizoram legislative assembly in India

Coordinates: 22.618°N 92.872°E

Lunglei South
- Constituency No. 33 for the Mizoram Legislative Assembly
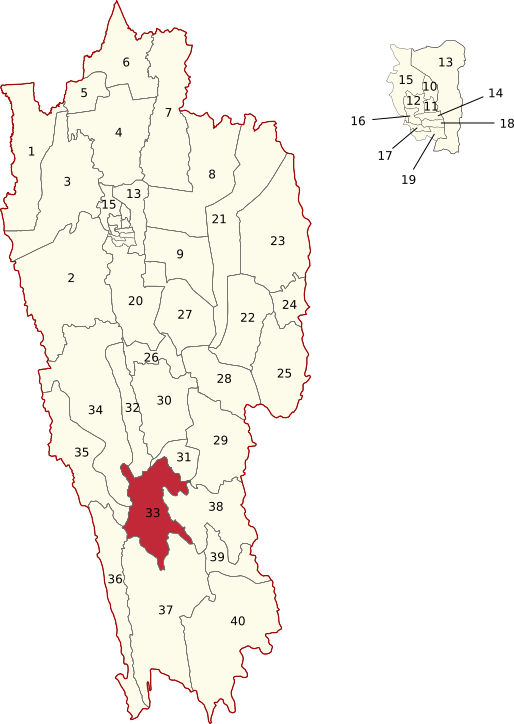

Constituency details
- Country: India
- Region: Northeast India
- State: Mizoram
- District: Lunglei
- Lok Sabha constituency: Mizoram
- Established: 1987
- Total electors: 19,050
- Reservation: ST

Member of Legislative Assembly
- 9th Mizoram Legislative Assembly
- Incumbent Lalramliana Papuia
- Party: Zoram People's Movement
- Elected year: 2023

Lunglei South is one of the 40 Legislative Assembly constituencies of Mizoram state in India. It was first established before the 1987 Mizoram Legislative Assembly election.

It is part of Lunglei district, and is reserved for candidates belonging to the Scheduled Tribes. As of 2018, it is represented by Lalramliana Papuia of the Zoram People's Movement party.

== Members of the Legislative Assembly ==
Year	Name	Party
2008	S. Laldingliana	Indian National Congress
2013	S. Laldingliana	Indian National Congress
2018	K Pachhunga	Mizo National Front
2023	Lalramliana Papuia	Zoram People's Movement

== Election results ==
=== 2023 ===
2023 Mizoram Legislative Assembly election: Lunglei South
Party	Candidate	Votes	%	±%
ZPM	Lalramliana Papuia			
MNF	Dr. K. Pachhunga			
INC	Meriam L. Hrangchal			
BJP	T. Biaksailova			
NOTA	None of the Above			
Majority				
Turnout				
		Swing		

=== 2018 ===
2018 Mizoram Legislative Assembly election: Lunglei South
Party	Candidate	Votes	%	±%
MNF	K Pachhunga			
NOTA	None of the Above			
Majority				
Turnout				
MNF gain from INC		Swing		
