= Aizawl West 3 Assembly constituency =

Constituency of the Mizoram legislative assembly in India

Coordinates: 23.717°N 92.712°E

Aizawl West 3
- Constituency No. 17 for the Mizoram Legislative Assembly
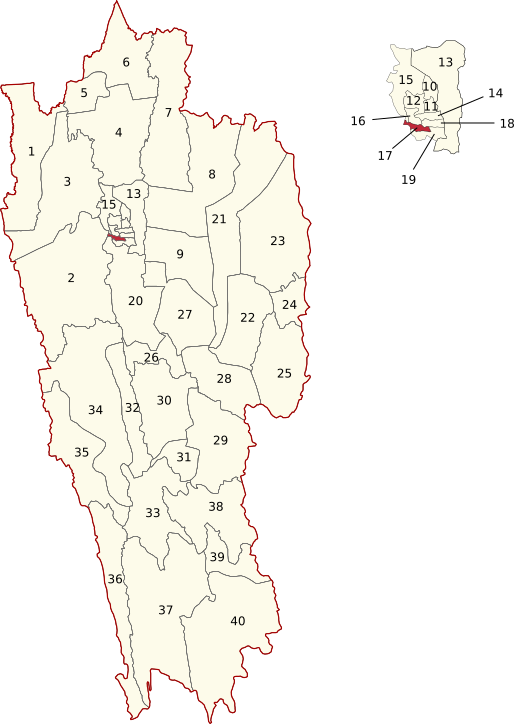

Constituency details
- Country: India
- Region: Northeast India
- State: Mizoram
- District: Aizawl
- Lok Sabha constituency: Mizoram
- Established: 1978
- Total electors: 19,043
- Reservation: ST

Member of Legislative Assembly
- 9th Mizoram Legislative Assembly
- Incumbent V. L. Zaithanzama
- Party: Zoram People's Movement
- Elected year: 2023

Aizawl West 3 is one of the 40 Legislative Assembly constituencies of Mizoram state in India.

It is part of Aizawl district and is reserved for candidates belonging to the Scheduled Tribes.

== Members of the Legislative Assembly ==
Year	Member	Party
2008	R. Selthuama	Indian National Congress
2013	Vanlalzawma	Mizo National Front
2018	V. L. Zaithanzama	Zoram People's Movement
2023	V. L. Zaithanzama	Zoram People's Movement

== Election results ==
=== 2023 ===
2023 Mizoram Legislative Assembly election: Aizawl West 3
Party	Candidate	Votes	%	±%
ZPM	V. L. Zaithanzama	9.202	49.46	
MNF	K. Lalsawmvela	4,620	24.83	
INC	Lalsawta	4,369	23.48	
AAP	Joseph Biakthianghlima	220	1.18	
NOTA	None of the Above	43	0.23	
Majority		4,582	24.63	
Turnout			76.24	
ZPM hold		Swing		

=== 2018 ===
2018 Mizoram Legislative Assembly election: Aizawl West 3
Party	Candidate	Votes	%	±%
ZPM	V. L. Zaithanzama	6,934	41.22	
MNF	Vanlalzawma	5,908	35.12	
INC	Dr. C.T. Tluanga	3,521	20.93	
NOTA	None of the Above	57	0.34	
Majority		1,026	6.1	
Turnout		16,820	78.00	
ZPM gain from MNF		Swing		

== See also ==
- List of constituencies of the Mizoram Legislative Assembly
- Aizawl district
