= Aizawl South 2 Assembly constituency =

Constituency of the Mizoram legislative assembly in India

Coordinates: 23.712°N 92.720°E

Aizawl South 2
- Constituency No. 19 for the Mizoram Legislative Assembly
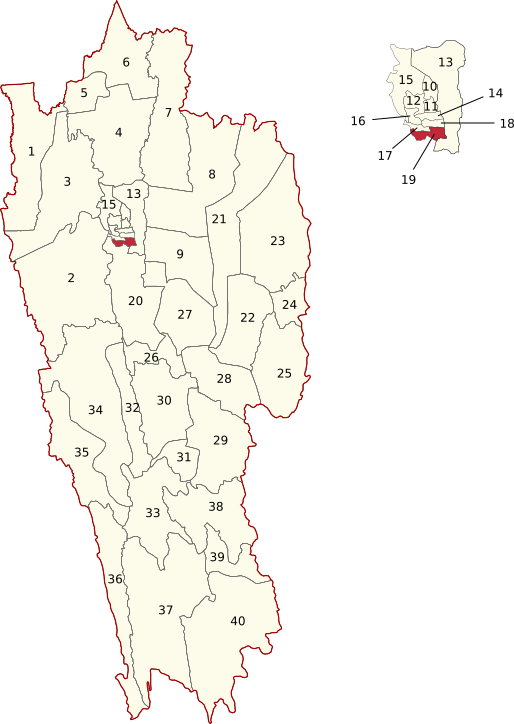

Constituency details
- Country: India
- Region: Northeast India
- State: Mizoram
- District: Aizawl
- Lok Sabha constituency: Mizoram
- Established: 2008
- Total electors: 21,232
- Reservation: ST

Member of Legislative Assembly
- 9th Mizoram Legislative Assembly
- Incumbent Lalchhuanthanga
- Party: Zoram People's Movement
- Elected year: 2023

Aizawl South 2 is one of the 40 Legislative Assembly constituencies of Mizoram state in India.

It is part of Aizawl district and is reserved for candidates belonging to the Scheduled Tribes.

== Members of the Legislative Assembly ==
Year	Name	Party
1989	Laldenga	Mizo National Front
2008	Zosangzuala	Indian National Congress
2013	Zosangzuala	Indian National Congress
2018	Lalchhuanthanga	Zoram People's Movement
2023	Lalchhuanthanga	Zoram People's Movement

== Election results ==
=== 2023 ===
2023 Mizoram Legislative Assembly election: Aizawl South 2
Party	Candidate	Votes	%	±%
ZPM	Lalchhuanthanga			
MNF	Denghmingthanga			
INC	Dr. Lalmalsawma Nghaka			
NOTA	None of the Above			
Majority				
Turnout				
		Swing		

=== 2018 ===
2018 Mizoram Legislative Assembly election: Aizawl South 2
Party	Candidate	Votes	%	±%
ZPM	Lalchhuanthanga			
NOTA	None of the Above			
Majority				
Turnout				
gain from		Swing		
