= F. Rodingliana =

Indian politician

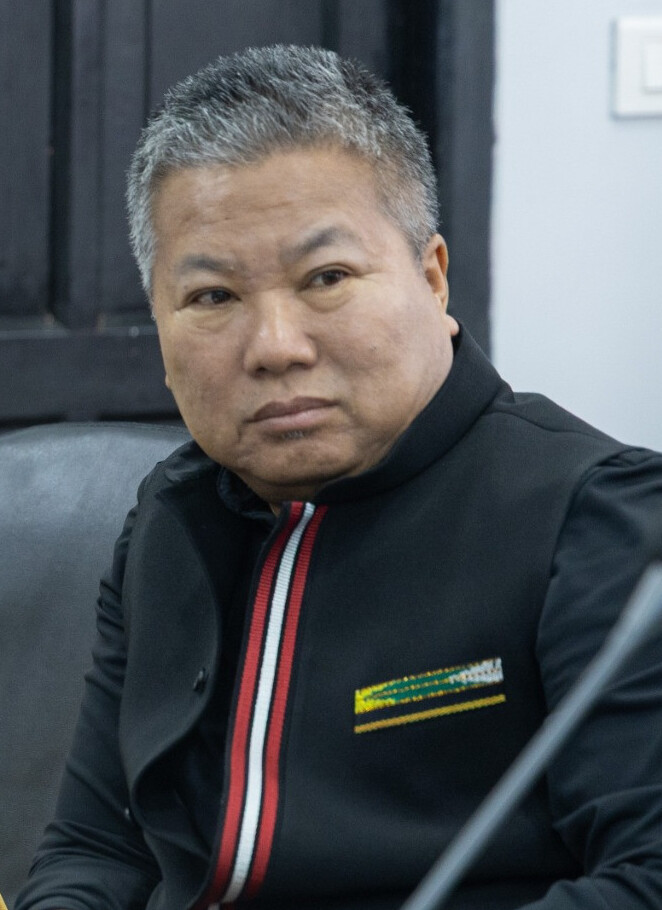
- F. Rodingliana in 2025

Member of the Mizoram Legislative Assembly
- Incumbent
- Assumed office December 2023
- Preceded by: Lthangmawia
- Constituency: Lengteng

Personal details
- Born: 15 November 1964 (age 61)
- Party: Zoram People's Movement (since 2017)
- Parent: F. Kapsanga (father)

F. Rodingliana is an Indian politician from Mizoram, who is currently the Minister of State for Power & Electricity Commerce & Industries Department and Printing & Stationery Department for the Government of Mizoram.

He was elected to the Mizoram Legislative Assembly for the Lengteng Assembly constituency in the 2023 general election as a candidate for the Zoram People's Movement.
