= Serlui Assembly constituency =

Constituency of the Mizoram legislative assembly in India

Coordinates: 24.462716°N 92.759729°E

Serlui
- Constituency No. 6 for the Mizoram Legislative Assembly
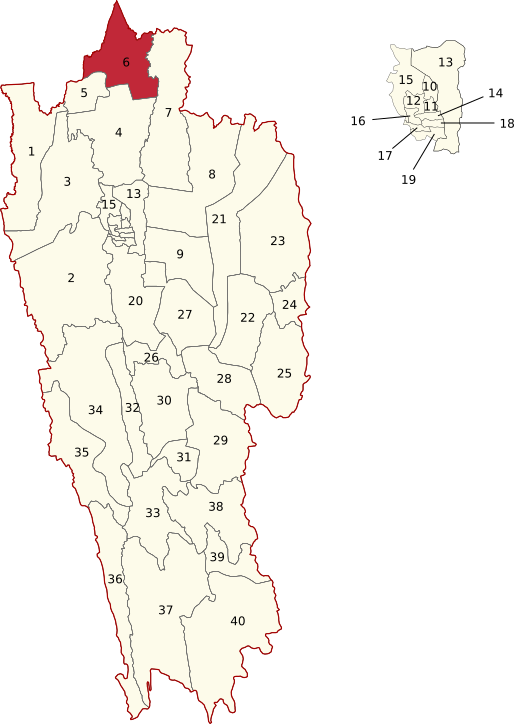

Constituency details
- Country: India
- Region: Northeast India
- State: Mizoram
- District: Kolasib
- Lok Sabha constituency: Mizoram
- Established: 2008
- Total electors: 16,627
- Reservation: ST

Member of Legislative Assembly
- 9th Mizoram Legislative Assembly
- Incumbent Lalrinsanga Ralte
- Party: Mizo National Front
- Elected year: 2023

Serlui is one of the 40 Legislative Assembly constituencies of Mizoram state in India.

It is part of Kolasib district and is reserved for candidates belonging to the Scheduled Tribes.

== Members of the Legislative Assembly ==
Year	Member	Party
2008	K. Lalrinthanga	Indian National Congress
2013	K. Lalrinthanga	Indian National Congress
2018	Lalrinsanga Ralte	Mizo National Front

== Election results ==
=== 2023 ===
2023 Mizoram Legislative Assembly election: Serlui
Party	Candidate	Votes	%	±%
MNF	Lalrinsanga Ralte			
INC	Lalhmachhuana			
ZPM	C. Lalthanfela			
BJP	Robinson Malsawmtluanga Hmar			
NOTA	None of the Above			
Majority				
Turnout				
		Swing		

=== 2018 ===
2018 Mizoram Legislative Assembly election: Serlui
Party	Candidate	Votes	%	±%
MNF	Lalrinsanga Ralte	6,128	38.17	▲7.71
INC	Lalhmachhuana	5201	32.39	▼8.13
ZPM	Lalmuanpuia Punte	1995	12.43	▼12.96
BJP	Vanlalhmuaka	1959	12.20	▲9.67
NPP	Hmingchungnunga	638	3.97	New
NOTA	None of the Above	134	0.83	▼0.28
Majority		927	5.82	
Turnout		16,055	83.82	▲0.89
MNF gain from INC		Swing		

=== 2013 ===
2013 Mizoram Legislative Assembly election: Serlui
Party	Candidate	Votes	%	±%
INC	K. Lalrinthanga	5,664	40.52	▲3.17
MNF	Lalhmingliana	4258	30.46	▲0.72
ZNP	R. Lalawia	3549	25.39	▲5.78
BJP	H. A. Dawngliana	354	2.53	New
NOTA	None of the Above	155	1.11	New
Majority		1406	10.17	
Turnout		13980	82.93	▲0.03
INC hold		Swing		

=== 2008 ===
2008 Mizoram Legislative Assembly election: Serlui
Party	Candidate	Votes	%	±%
INC	K. Lalrinthanga	4,536	37.35	
MNF	D. Thangliana	3612	29.74	
ZNP	H. L. Hluna	2381	19.61	
Independent	Vanlalhmuaka	1370	11.28	
LB	Laldawmliana	169	1.39	
LJP	David Lalrosanga	76	0.63	
Majority		924	7.61	
Turnout		12144	82.9	
INC win (new seat)				
