= Lunglei West Assembly constituency =

Constituency of the Mizoram legislative assembly in India

Coordinates: 22.877°N 92.713°E

Lunglei West
- Constituency No. 32 for the Mizoram Legislative Assembly
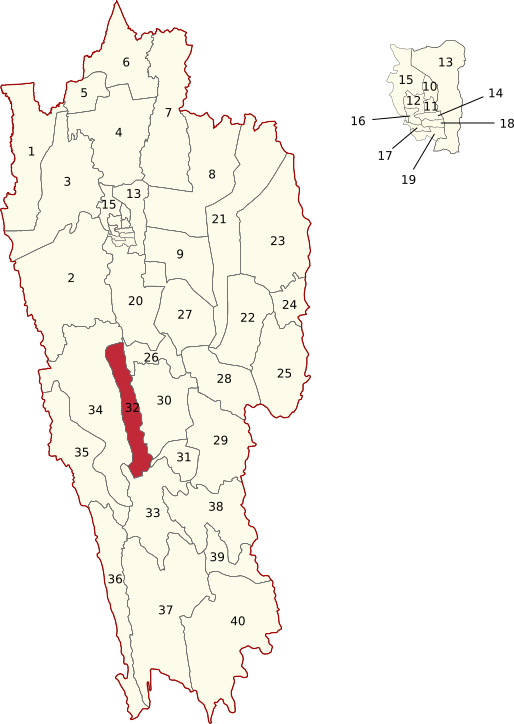

Constituency details
- Country: India
- Region: Northeast India
- State: Mizoram
- District: Lunglei
- Lok Sabha constituency: Mizoram
- Established: 2008
- Total electors: 13,102
- Reservation: ST

Member of Legislative Assembly
- 9th Mizoram Legislative Assembly
- Incumbent T. Lalhlimpuia
- Party: Zoram People's Movement
- Elected year: 2023

Lunglei West is one of the 40 Legislative Assembly constituencies of Mizoram state in India.

It is part of Lunglei district and is reserved for candidates belonging to the Scheduled Tribes.

== Members of the Legislative Assembly ==
Year	Name	Party
2008	Lalthangliana	Mizo National Front
2013	Chalrosanga Ralte	Indian National Congress
2018	C. Lalrinsanga	Mizo National Front
2023	T. Lalhlimpuia	Zoram People's Movement

== Election results ==
=== 2023 ===
2023 Mizoram Legislative Assembly election: Lunglei West
Party	Candidate	Votes	%	±%
MNF	C. Lalrinsanga			
INC	P. C. Lalthanliana			
BJP	R. Lalbiaktluangi			
ZPM	T. Lalhlimpuia			
NOTA	None of the Above			
Majority				
Turnout				
		Swing		

=== 2018 ===
2018 Mizoram Legislative Assembly election: Lunglei West
Party	Candidate	Votes	%	±%
MNF	C. Lalrinsanga			
NOTA	None of the Above			
Majority				
Turnout				
gain from		Swing		
