= Champhai South Assembly constituency =

Constituency of the Mizoram legislative assembly in India

Coordinates: 23.366°N 93.383°E

Champhai South
- Constituency No. 24 for the Mizoram Legislative Assembly
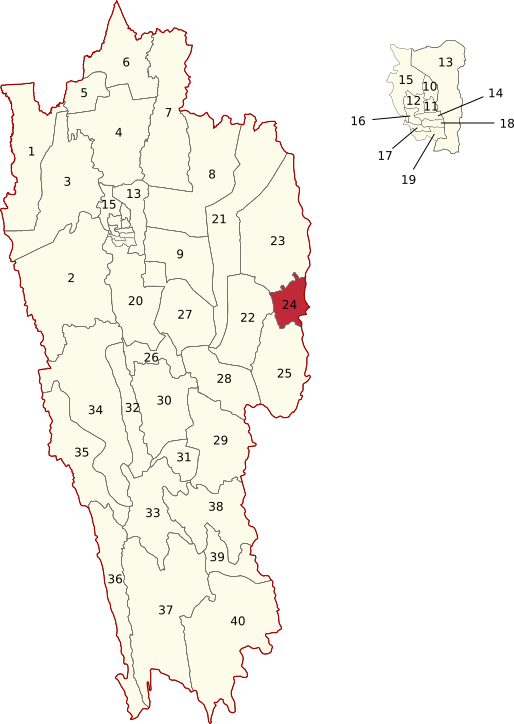

Constituency details
- Country: India
- Region: Northeast India
- State: Mizoram
- District: Champhai
- Lok Sabha constituency: Mizoram
- Established: 2008
- Total electors: 15,590
- Reservation: ST

Member of Legislative Assembly
- 9th Mizoram Legislative Assembly
- Incumbent Clement Lalhmingthanga
- Party: ZPM
- Elected year: 2023

Champhai South is one of the 40 Legislative Assembly constituencies of Mizoram state in India. It comprises Wards 4-8 and 11-15 of Champhai town, and a few other parts of Champhai district and is reserved for candidates belonging to the Scheduled Tribes.

== Members of the Legislative Assembly ==
Year	Name	Party
2008	J. H. Rothuama	Indian National Congress
2013	J. H. Rothuama	Indian National Congress
2018	T.J. Lalnuntluanga	Mizo National Front
2023	Clement Lalhmingthanga	Zoram People's Movement

== Election results ==
=== 2023 ===
2023 Mizoram Legislative Assembly election: Champhai South
Party	Candidate	Votes	%	±%
ZPM	Lt. Col. Clement Lalhmingthanga	7,323	42.16	
MNF	T. J. Lalnuntluanga	6,994	40.27	
INC	Dr. Lallianchhunga	2,956	17.02	
NOTA	None of the Above	96	0.55	
Majority				
Turnout		17,369	80.67	
ZPM gain from MNF		Swing		

=== 2018 ===
2018 Mizoram Legislative Assembly election: Champhai South
Party	Candidate	Votes	%	±%
MNF	T. J. Lalnuntluanga			
NOTA	None of the Above			
Majority				
Turnout				
MNF gain from INC		Swing		

== See also ==
- Champhai district
- List of constituencies of the Mizoram Legislative Assembly
