= Lunglei North Assembly constituency =

Constituency of the Mizoram legislative assembly in India

Coordinates: 22.977°N 92.820°E

Lunglei North
- Constituency No. 30 for the Mizoram Legislative Assembly
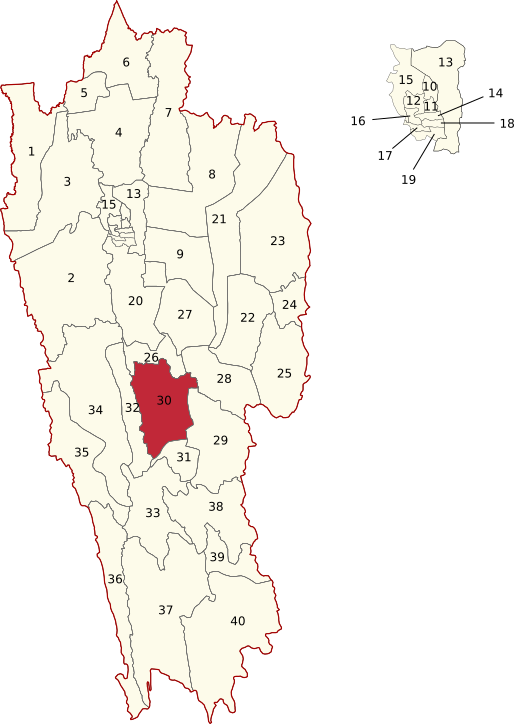

Constituency details
- Country: India
- Region: Northeast India
- State: Mizoram
- District: Lunglei
- Lok Sabha constituency: Mizoram
- Established: 1987
- Total electors: 14,737
- Reservation: ST

Member of Legislative Assembly
- 9th Mizoram Legislative Assembly
- Incumbent V. Malsawmtluanga
- Party: Zoram People's Movement
- Elected year: 2023

Lunglei North is one of the 40 Legislative Assembly constituencies of Mizoram state in India.

It is part of Lunglei district and is reserved for candidates belonging to the Scheduled Tribes.

== Members of the Legislative Assembly ==
Election	Name	Party
2003	R Lalthangliana	Mizo National Front
2008	P C Lalthanliana	Indian National Congress
2013	P C Lalthanliana	Indian National Congress
2018	Vanlaltanpuia	Mizo National Front
2023	V. Malsawmtluanga	Zoram People's Movement

== Election results ==
=== 2023 ===
2023 Mizoram Legislative Assembly election: Lunglei North
Party	Candidate	Votes	%	±%
ZPM	V. Malsawmtluanga	7,369	48.02	
MNF	Dr. Vanlaltanpuia	5,394	35.15	
INC	Eric R. Zomuanpuia			
NOTA	None of the Above			
Majority				
Turnout				
		Swing		

=== 2018 ===
2018 Mizoram Legislative Assembly election: Lunglei North
Party	Candidate	Votes	%	±%
MNF	Vanlaltanpuia			
NOTA	None of the Above			
Majority				
Turnout				
gain from		Swing		
