= Champhai North Assembly constituency =

Constituency of the Mizoram legislative assembly in India

Coordinates: 23.479°N 93.311°E

Champhai North
- Constituency No. 23 for the Mizoram Legislative Assembly
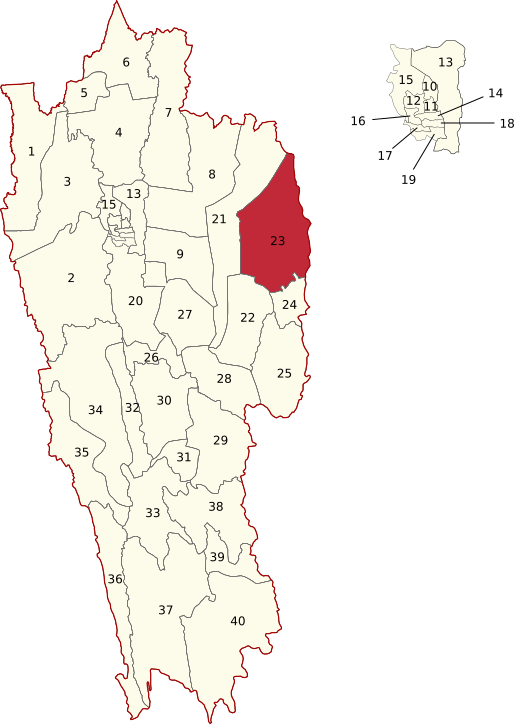

Constituency details
- Country: India
- Region: Northeast India
- State: Mizoram
- District: Champhai
- Lok Sabha constituency: Mizoram
- Established: 2008
- Total electors: 16,858
- Reservation: ST

Member of Legislative Assembly
- 9th Mizoram Legislative Assembly
- Incumbent Er. H Ginzalala
- Party: Zoram People's Movement
- Elected year: 2023

Champhai North is one of the 40 Legislative Assembly constituencies of Mizoram state in India.

It is part of Champhai district and is reserved for candidates belonging to the Scheduled Tribes.

== Members of the Legislative Assembly ==
Year	Name	Party
2008	T. T. Zothansanga	Indian National Congress
2013	T. T. Zothansanga	Indian National Congress
2018	Z R Thiamsanga	Mizo National Front
2023	Er. H. Ginzalala	Zoram People's Movement

== Election results ==
=== 2023 ===
2023 Mizoram Legislative Assembly election: Champhai North
Party	Candidate	Votes	%	±%
ZPM	H. Ginzalala			
MNF	Dr. Z.R. Thiamsanga			
BJP	P.S. Zatluanga			
INC	K. Lalnunmawia			
NOTA	None of the Above			
Majority				
Turnout				
		Swing		

=== 2018 ===
2018 Mizoram Legislative Assembly election: Champhai North
Party	Candidate	Votes	%	±%
MNF	ZR Thiamsanga			
NOTA	None of the Above			
Majority				
Turnout				
gain from		Swing		
