= Lengteng Assembly constituency =

Constituency of the Mizoram legislative assembly in India

Coordinates: 23.81°N 93.25°E

Lengteng
- Constituency No. 21 for the Mizoram Legislative Assembly
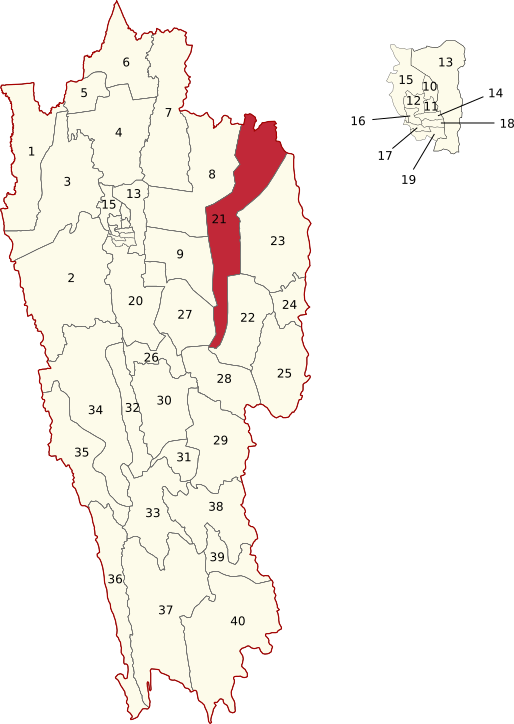

Constituency details
- Country: India
- Region: Northeast India
- State: Mizoram
- District: Champhai
- Lok Sabha constituency: Mizoram
- Established: 2008
- Total electors: 16,016
- Reservation: ST

Member of Legislative Assembly
- 9th Mizoram Legislative Assembly
- Incumbent F. Rodingliana
- Party: ZPM
- Elected year: 2023

Lengteng is one of the 40 Legislative Assembly constituencies of Mizoram state in India. It was created after the passing of the Delimitation of Parliamentary and Assembly Constituencies Order, 2008.

It is part of Champhai district, and is reserved for candidates belonging to the Scheduled Tribes. As of 2018, it is represented by F. Rodingliana of the Zoram People's Movement.

== Members of the Legislative Assembly ==
| Year | name | Picture | Party |
|---|---|---|---|
| 2008 | H. Rohluna | | Indian National Congress |
| 2013 | H. Rohluna | | Indian National Congress |
| 2018 | Lthangmawia | | Mizo National Front |
| 2023 | F.Rodingliana | | Zoram People's Movement |

== Election results ==
=== 2023 ===
2023 Mizoram Legislative Assembly election: Lengteng
| Party | Candidate | Votes | % | ±% |
|---|---|---|---|---|
| MNF | L. Thangmawia | | | |
| INC | Lalhmingthanga Pachuau | | | |
| BJP | B. Suanzalang | | | |
| ZPM | F.Rodingliana | | | |
| NOTA | None of the Above | | | |
| Majority | | | | |
| Turnout | | | | |
| | | Swing | | |

=== 2018 ===
2018 Mizoram Legislative Assembly election: Lengteng
| Party | Candidate | Votes | % | ±% |
|---|---|---|---|---|
| MNF | Lthangmawia | | | |
| NOTA | None of the Above | | | |
| Majority | | | | |
| Turnout | | | | |
| MNF gain from INC | | Swing | | |

== See also ==
- Champhai district
- List of constituencies of the Mizoram Legislative Assembly
