= Tuirial Assembly constituency =

Constituency of the Mizoram legislative assembly in India

Coordinates: 24.124°N 92.690°E

Tuirial
- Constituency No. 4 for the Mizoram Legislative Assembly
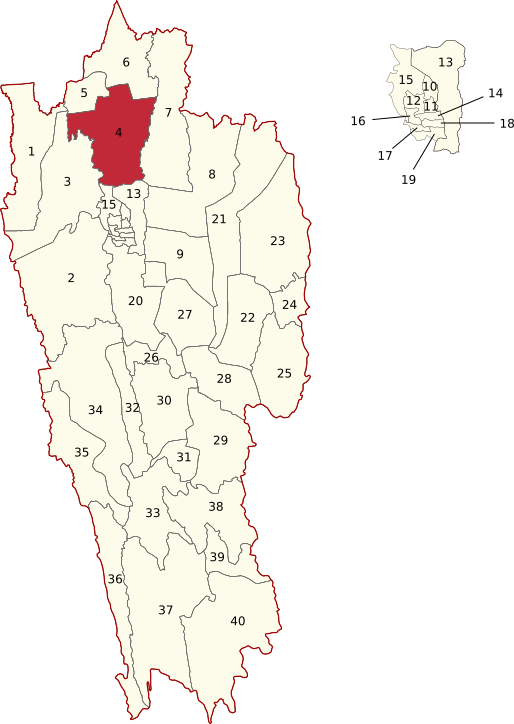

Constituency details
- Country: India
- Region: Northeast India
- State: Mizoram
- District: Kolasib
- Lok Sabha constituency: Mizoram
- Established: 2008
- Total electors: 15,569
- Reservation: ST

Member of Legislative Assembly
- 9th Mizoram Legislative Assembly
- Incumbent K. Laldawngliana
- Party: Mizo National Front
- Elected year: 2023

Tuirial is one of the 40 Legislative Assembly constituencies of Mizoram state in India.

It is part of Kolasib district and is reserved for candidates belonging to the Scheduled Tribes.

== Members of the Legislative Assembly ==
Year	Member	Party
2008	Hmingdailova Khiangte	Indian National Congress
2013	Hmingdailova Khiangte	Indian National Congress
2018	Andrew H. Thangliana	Zoram People's Movement
2021^	K. Laldawngliana	Mizo National Front

^by-election

== Election results ==
=== 2023 ===
2023 Mizoram Legislative Assembly election: Tuirial
Party	Candidate	Votes	%	±%
MNF	K. Laldawngliana	6,610	41.69	
ZPM	Laltlanmawia	6,597	41.61	
INC	Dr. Henry Zodinliana Pachuau	2,503	15.79	
BJP	F. Vanhmingthanga	73	0.46	
NOTA	None of the Above	72	0.45	
Majority		13	0.08	
Turnout				
MNF hold		Swing		

=== 2021 by-election ===
2021 Tuirial by-election
Party	Candidate	Votes	%	±%
MNF	K. Laldawngliana	5,820	39.89	▲10.53
ZPM	Laltlanmawia	4536	31.09	▲0.29
INC	Chalrosanga Ralte	3927	26.92	▲0.61
BJP	K. Laldinthara	246	1.69	▼1.73
NOTA	None of the Above	61	0.42	▼0.01
Majority		1284	8.80	
Turnout		14,590		
MNF gain from ZPM		Swing		

=== 2018 ===
2018 Mizoram Legislative Assembly election: Tuirial
Party	Candidate	Votes	%	±%
ZPM	Andrew H. Thangliana	4,387	30.80	▼29.71
MNF	Sailothanga Sailo	4183	29.36	New
INC	Joseph L. Ralte	3748	26.31	▼12.81
NPP	Hmingdailova Khiangte	1209	8.49	New
BJP	Jacob T. Vanlawma	487	3.42	New
PRISM	B. Vanlalhruaia	104	0.73	New
Independent	V. Lalennawma	66	0.46	New
NOTA	None of the Above	63	0.43	▼0.36
Majority		204	1.44	
Turnout		14,245	83.78	▲0.54
ZPM gain from INC		Swing		

=== 2013 ===
2013 Mizoram Legislative Assembly election: Tuirial
Party	Candidate	Votes	%	±%
INC	Hmingdailova Khiangte	5,119	39.12	▼0.46
ZNP	Joseph L. Ralte	4880	37.30	New
MPC	Kenneth Chawngliana	2982	22.79	▼8.22
NOTA	None of the Above	103	0.79	New
Majority		239	1.84	
Turnout		13084	83.24	▲1.15
INC hold		Swing		

=== 2008 ===
2008 Mizoram Legislative Assembly election: Tuirial
Party	Candidate	Votes	%	±%
INC	Hmingdailova Khiangte	4,717	39.58	New
MPC	Sailothanga Sailo	3695	31.01	New
MNF	Lalliankima	3204	26.89	New
Independent	Lalhluna	188	1.58	New
Independent	Moses Malsawmtluanga	78	0.65	New
LJP	Zoramsangzela	35	0.29	New
Majority		1022	8.58	
Turnout		11917	81.9	
INC win (new seat)				
