= Aizawl South 3 Assembly constituency =

Constituency of the Mizoram legislative assembly in India

Coordinates: 23.657°N 92.727°E

Aizawl South 3
- Constituency No. 20 for the Mizoram Legislative Assembly
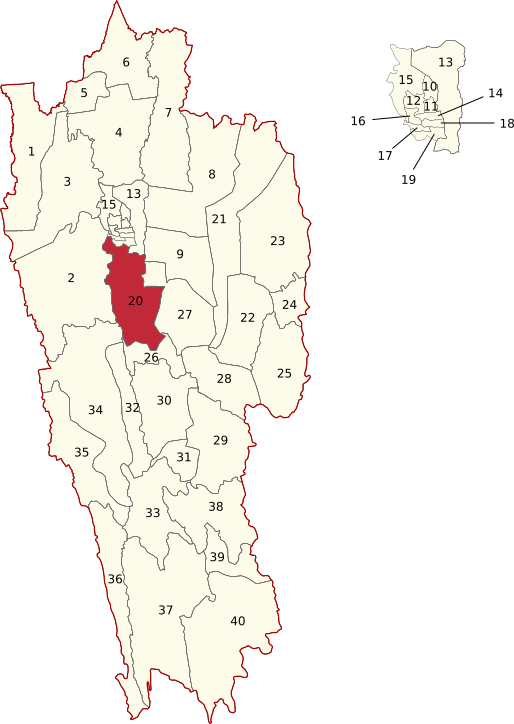

Constituency details
- Country: India
- Region: Northeast India
- State: Mizoram
- District: Aizawl
- Lok Sabha constituency: Mizoram
- Established: 2008
- Total electors: 17,619
- Reservation: ST

Member of Legislative Assembly
- 9th Mizoram Legislative Assembly
- Incumbent Baryl Vanneihsangi
- Party: ZPM
- Elected year: 2023

Aizawl South 3 is one of the 40 Legislative Assembly constituencies of Mizoram state in India.

It is part of Aizawl district and is reserved for candidates belonging to the Scheduled Tribes.

== Members of the Legislative Assembly ==
Election	Name	Party
2008	K. S. Thanga	Indian National Congress
2013	K. S. Thanga	Indian National Congress
2018	F Lalnunmawia	Mizo National Front
2023	Baryl Vanneihsangi	ZPM

== Election results ==
=== 2023 ===
2023 Mizoram Legislative Assembly election: Aizawl South 3
Party	Candidate	Votes	%	±%
MNF	F. Lalnunmawia	7956	41.03	
INC	Rosiamngheta	2066	10.68	
ZPM	Baryl Vanneihsangi	9,370	48.29	
NOTA	None of the Above			
Majority				
Turnout				
Baryl Vanneihsangi hold		Swing		

=== 2018 ===
2018 Mizoram Legislative Assembly election: Aizawl South 3
Party	Candidate	Votes	%	±%
MNF	F Lalnunmawia	7,558		
INC	KS Thanga	5470		
Majority				
Turnout				
gain from		Swing		
