= B. Lalchhanzova =

Indian politician and social worker

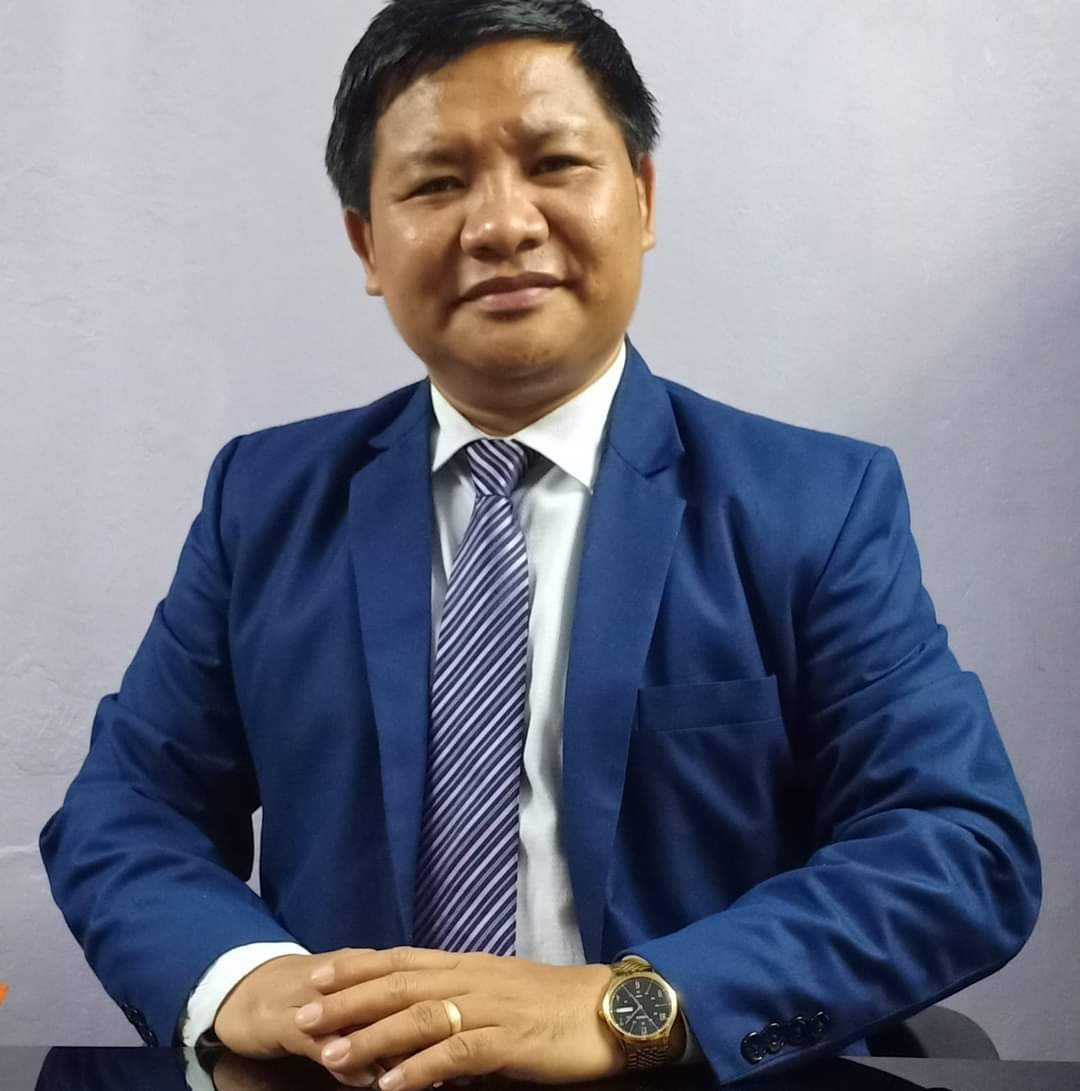
- Lalchhanzova in 2023

Minister of State, Government of Mizoram

Member of the Mizoram Legislative Assembly for Aizawl East 2
- Incumbent
- Assumed office 8 December 2023
- Portfolio: Food, Civil Supplies & Consumer Affairs; Land Revenue & Settlement
- Preceded by: Robert Romawia Royte
- Incumbent
- Assumed office 8 December 2023

Personal details
- Born: 15 November 1973 (age 52) Aizawl, Mizoram, India
- Party: Zoram People's Movement (since 2017)
- Parent: B. Lalthuamliana (father)
- Education: Master of Arts in Social Work
- Alma mater: Mizoram University
- Occupation: Politician, social worker
- Profession: Social worker
- Known for: Minister of State, Founder Director of Cod-Nerc

B. Lalchhanzova (born 15 November 1973) is an Indian politician and social worker from Mizoram, India. He is the Minister of State for Food, Civil Supplies & Consumer Affairs and Land Revenue & Settlement for the Government of Mizoram. He was elected to the Mizoram Legislative Assembly for the Aizawl East 2 constituency in the 2023 general election as a candidate for the Zoram People's Movement. He is also the founder director of Cod-Nerc, a non-governmental organization established in 1992 focused on sustainable development and community welfare in Mizoram.

== Education ==
B. Lalchhanzova completed his Master of Arts in Social Work at Mizoram University in 2005, equipping him with expertise in community development and social welfare.

== Career ==
Lalchhanzova founded Cod-Nerc (Community Development of North East Region Consultancy) in 1992, an NGO dedicated to sustainable development in Mizoram. Cod-Nerc focuses on welfare initiatives, including education, health, and environmental sustainability, benefiting Mizoram’s tribal and rural communities and contributing to Northeast India’s broader welfare goals. His leadership in Cod-Nerc reflects his commitment to grassroots development and social equity.

In politics, Lalchhanzova joined the Zoram People's Movement (ZPM) in 2017 and won the Aizawl East 2 constituency in the 2023 Mizoram Legislative Assembly election, defeating MNF candidate B. Lalawmpuii by 2,756 votes. Appointed Minister of State on 8 December 2023 in the Lalduhoma-led ZPM cabinet, he oversees the Food, Civil Supplies & Consumer Affairs department, ensuring food security, and the Land Revenue & Settlement department, promoting equitable land management for Mizoram’s communities.
