= Hachhek Assembly constituency =

Constituency of the Mizoram legislative assembly in India

Coordinates: 24.175668°N 92.372431°E

Hachhek
- Constituency No. 1 for the Mizoram Legislative Assembly
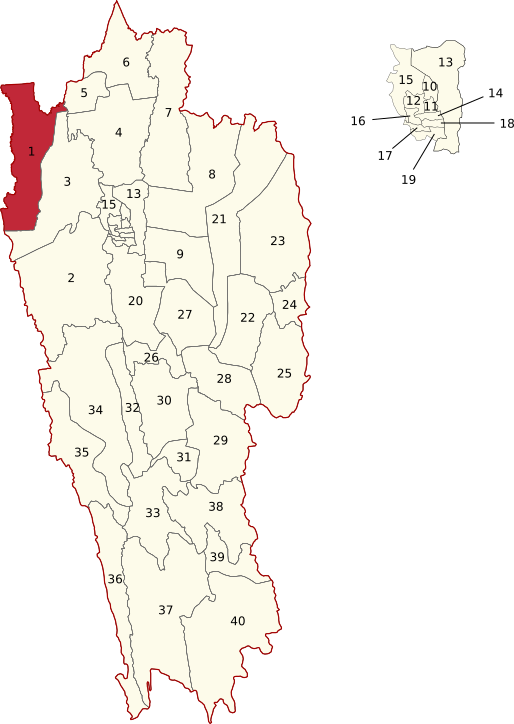

Constituency details
- Country: India
- Region: Northeast India
- State: Mizoram
- District: Mamit
- Lok Sabha constituency: Mizoram
- Established: 2008
- Total electors: 21,136
- Reservation: ST

Member of Legislative Assembly
- 9th Mizoram Legislative Assembly
- Incumbent Robert Romawia Royte
- Party: Mizo National Front
- Elected year: 2023

Hachhek is one of the 40 Legislative Assembly constituencies of Mizoram state in India.

It is part of Mamit district and is reserved for candidates belonging to the Scheduled tribes.

== Members of the Legislative Assembly ==
| Election | Name | Party |
|---|---|---|
| 2008 | Lalrinmawia Ralte | Indian National Congress |
| 2013 | Lalrinmawia Ralte | Indian National Congress |
| 2018 | Lalrindika Ralte | Indian National Congress |
| 2023 | Robert Romawia Royte | Mizo National Front |

== Election results ==
=== 2023 ===
2023 Mizoram Legislative Assembly election: Hachhek
| Party | Candidate | Votes | % | ±% |
|---|---|---|---|---|
| MNF | Robert Romawia Royte | 5,705 | 32.42 | ▲1.06 |
| ZPM | KJ Lalbiakngheta | 5,399 | 30.68 | ▲23.3 |
| INC | Lalrindika Ralte | 5,105 | 29.01 | ▼4.32 |
| BJP | Malsawmtluanga | 1,259 | 7.15 | ▼16.49 |
| NOTA | None of the Above | 130 | 0.74 | ▼0.6 |
| Majority | | 306 | 1.74 | ▲0.78 |
| Turnout | | 17,958 | | |
| MNF gain from INC | | Swing | | |

=== 2018 ===
2018 Mizoram Legislative Assembly election: Hachhek
| Party | Candidate | Votes | % | ±% |
|---|---|---|---|---|
| INC | Lalrindika Ralte | 6,202 | 33.32 | ▼12.03 |
| MNF | Lalrinenga Sailo | 5836 | 31.36 | ▼0.51 |
| BJP | Vanlalruata Pachuau | 4399 | 23.64 | ▲22.74 |
| ZPM | H. Lallianzuala | 1373 | 7.38 | ▲0.80 |
| PRISM | Eddy Zosangliana Colney | 250 | 1.34 | New |
| Independent | Lalzenghaki | 133 | 0.71 | New |
| Independent | J. Lalsailova | 91 | 0.49 | New |
| NCP | C. Ramkinlova | 78 | 0.42 | ▼13.83 |
| NOTA | None of the Above | 250 | 1.34 | ▲0.28 |
| Majority | | 366 | 0.96 | |
| Turnout | | 18,612 | 78.29 | ▼3.55 |
| INC hold | | Swing | | |

=== 2013 ===
2013 Mizoram Legislative Assembly election: Hachhek
| Party | Candidate | Votes | % | ±% |
|---|---|---|---|---|
| INC | Lalrinmawia Ralte | 7,852 | 45.35 | ▼6.61 |
| MNF | Saikapthianga | 5,519 | 31.87 | ▼0.64 |
| NCP | Lalhmingthanga | 2,467 | 14.25 | New |
| ZNP | Lalzamlova Tochhawng | 1,139 | 6.58 | New |
| BJP | Pazawna | 155 | 0.90 | New |
| NOTA | None of the Above | 183 | 1.06 | New |
| Majority | | 2,333 | 13.58 | |
| Turnout | | 17,315 | 81.84 | ▼2.06 |
| INC hold | | Swing | | |

=== 2008 ===
2008 Mizoram Legislative Assembly election: Hachhek
| Party | Candidate | Votes | % | ±% |
|---|---|---|---|---|
| INC | Lalrinmawia Ralte | 6,990 | 51.96 | New |
| MNF | H. Lalenvela | 4,373 | 32.51 | New |
| MPC | John Lalngilneia | 1,840 | 13.68 | New |
| JD(U) | Laldinliana | 139 | 1.03 | New |
| LJP | P. C. Lalthanpuia | 111 | 0.83 | New |
| Majority | | 2,615 | 19.45 | |
| Turnout | | 13,453 | 83.9 | |
| INC win (new seat) | | | | |
