= Baryl Vanneihsangi =

Indian TV presenter, radio jockey and politician

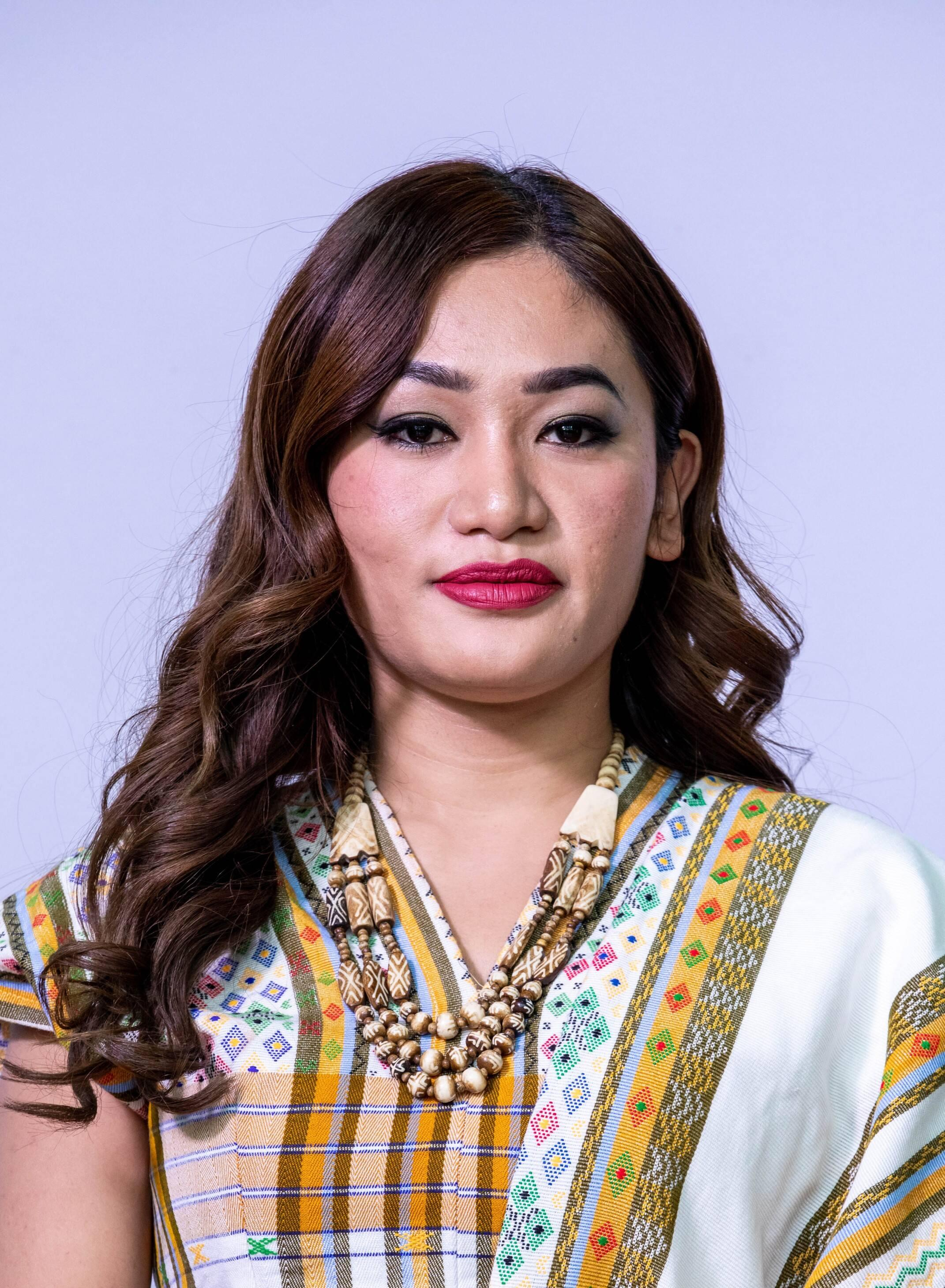

Member of the Mizoram Legislative Assembly
- Incumbent
- Assumed office 8 December 2023
- Preceded by: F. Lalnunmawia
- Constituency: Aizawl South 3

Corporator, Aizawl Municipal Corporation
- Incumbent
- Assumed office 18 February 2021
- Preceded by: C. Lalthansanga
- Constituency: Ward no. 19

Personal details
- Born: Baryl Vanneihsangi Tlau; 28 February 1991 (age 35) Aizawl, Mizoram
- Party: Zoram People's Movement
- Education: Master of Arts (history)
- Alma mater: North-Eastern Hill University
- Occupation: TV presenter, radio jockey, politician
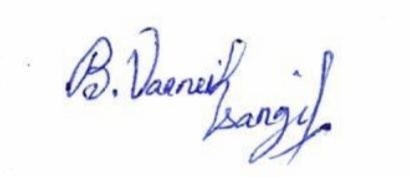
- Signature

Baryl Vanneihsangi Tlau (born 28 February 1991) is an Indian TV presenter, radio jockey and politician. She is a member of the 9th Mizoram Assembly in India and represents the South 3 constituency of the Aizawl district as a member of the Zoram People's Movement Party. She also serves as an elected corporator in Aizawl Municipal Corporation (AMC).

She became the first woman to preside over the Mizoram Legislative Assembly.

== Early life and education ==
Baryl Vanneihsangi Tlau was born on 28 February 1991 to Vanrochhuanga in Aizawl. In 2014, she earned a Master of Arts degree in history from North Eastern Hill University in Shillong.

Before starting her political career, she was a TV presenter and radio jockey.

== Political career ==
In the 2021 Aizawl Municipal Corporation elections, Vanneihsangi was elected as a councillor from Ward Number XIX, representing the Zoram People's Movement.

In the 2023 9th Mizoram Assembly elections, she secured a seat as a Member of the Legislative Assembly for Mizoram, representing the Aizawl South 3 Assembly constituency as a candidate for the Zoram People's Party. She was the youngest member of the Mizoram Legislative Assembly elected in 2023.

Vanneihsangi became the first woman to preside over the 40-member Mizoram Legislative Assembly on 7 March 2024.

== Awards ==
In 2025, Vanneihsangi, received the Women Achievers Award by the FICCI Ladies Organisation (FLO) for her contributions to politics and women's empowerment.
