= H. Ginzalala =

Indian politician

Member of the Mizoram Legislative Assembly

Ginzalala Hauzel (born 15 March 1973) is an Indian politician from Mizoram. He is an MLA from the Champhai North Assembly constituency, in Champhai district. He was elected in the 2023 Mizoram Legislative Assembly election, representing the Zoram People's Movement.

== Early life and education ==
Ginzalala is from Hunthar, Aizawl, Mizoram. He is the son of the late H. Chinzapau, a pastor. He married Donny M.S Dawngliani and they have three children.

He holds a Bachelor of Technology (BTech) from NERIST, and a Master's in Engineering (Thermal Engineering) from Delhi College of Engineering/Delhi University. He also completed a certificate in Environmental Science, reflecting his interest in sustainable development and environmental stewardship.

== Political career ==
After contesting unsuccessfully the Lengteng constituency on two occasions, Ginzalala was elected from the Champhai North Assembly constituency representing the Zoram People's Movement in the 2023 Mizoram Legislative Assembly election. He polled 7,134 votes and defeated his nearest rival, Z. R. Thiamsanga of the Mizo National Front, by a margin of 710 votes.

He serves as an Adviser to the Chief Minister (Technical) of Mizoram and is associated with the Public Works Department (PWD), working alongside Minister Vanlalhlana.

== Engineering career ==
During his work with the Mizoram Government, he was involved in overseeing the regulatory processes of the Bairabi Thermal Project, Bairabi. He later founded and led P&V Engineers, which implemented solar-powered water supply systems across remote Himalayan regions, including Mizoram and Sikkim, providing safe drinking water to thousands of rural villages.
