= Tuikum Assembly constituency =

Constituency of the Mizoram legislative assembly in India

Coordinates: 23.467°N 92.855°E

Tuikum
- Constituency No. 27 for the Mizoram Legislative Assembly
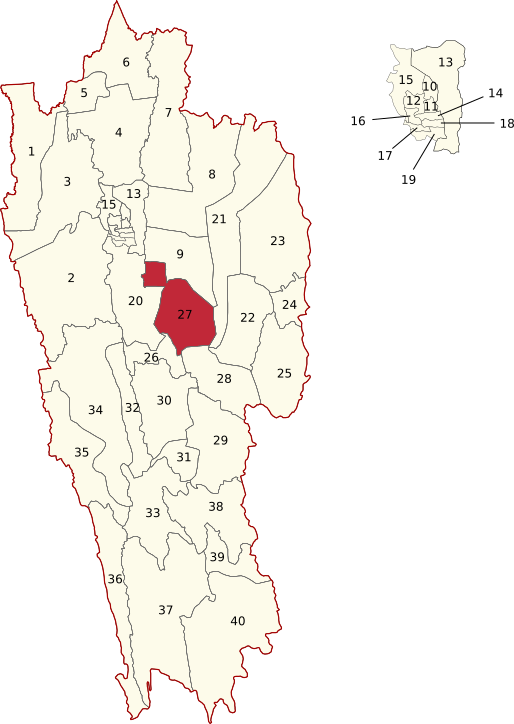

Constituency details
- Country: India
- Region: Northeast India
- State: Mizoram
- District: Serchhip
- Lok Sabha constituency: Mizoram
- Established: 2008
- Total electors: 14,255
- Reservation: ST

Member of Legislative Assembly
- 9th Mizoram Legislative Assembly
- Incumbent P. C. Vanlalruata
- Party: Zoram People's Movement
- Elected year: 2023

Tuikum is one of the 40 Legislative Assembly constituencies of Mizoram state in India.

It is part of Serchhip district and is reserved for candidates belonging to the Scheduled Tribes.

== Members of the Legislative Assembly ==
| Election | Name | Party |
|---|---|---|
| 2008 | K. Lianzuala | Indian National Congress |
| 2013 | Lalrinawma | Mizo National Front |
| 2018 | Lalrinawma | Mizo National Front |
| 2023 | P. C. Vanlalruata | Zoram People's Movement |

== Election results ==
=== 2023 ===
2023 Mizoram Legislative Assembly election: Tuikum
| Party | Candidate | Votes | % | ±% |
|---|---|---|---|---|
| ZPM | P. C. Vanlalruata | 7,136 | 47.58 | |
| MNF | Lalrinawma | 4,975 | 33.17 | |
| INC | T. T. Zothansanga | 2,679 | 17.86 | |
| NOTA | None of the Above | 42 | 0.28 | |
| Majority | | 2,161 | 14.41 | |
| Turnout | | | 87.32 | |
| ZPM gain from MNF | | Swing | | |

=== 2018 ===
2018 Mizoram Legislative Assembly election: Tuikum
| Party | Candidate | Votes | % | ±% |
|---|---|---|---|---|
| MNF | Lalrinawma | 5,439 | 39.85 | |
| NOTA | None of the Above | 59 | 0.43 | |
| Majority | | | | |
| Turnout | | 13,647 | 87.65 | |
| MNF hold | | Swing | | |
