= K. Lalrinliana =

Indian politician

K. Lalrinliana is an Indian politician who is serving as Member of Mizoram Legislative Assembly and Minister of State for Food, Civil Supplies & Consumer Affairs, LAD, Fisheries.

== Personal life ==
He was born on 1 January 1960, in Kolasib to K. Thanhawla. In 28 September 2021, he was tested positive for COVID-19.
