= Chalfilh Assembly constituency =

Constituency of the Mizoram legislative assembly in India

Coordinates: 23.926°N 93.121°E

Chalfilh
- Constituency No. 8 for the Mizoram Legislative Assembly
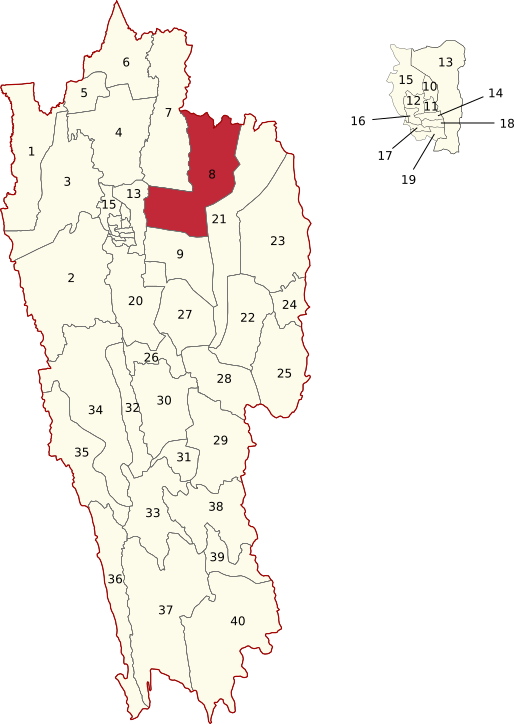

Constituency details
- Country: India
- Region: Northeast India
- State: Mizoram
- District: Aizawl
- Lok Sabha constituency: Mizoram
- Established: 2008
- Total electors: 17,039
- Reservation: ST

Member of Legislative Assembly
- 9th Mizoram Legislative Assembly
- Incumbent Lalbiakzama
- Party: Zoram People's Movement
- Elected year: 2023

Chalfilh is one of the 40 Legislative Assembly constituencies of Mizoram state in India.

It is part of Aizawl district and is reserved for candidates belonging to the Scheduled Tribes.

== Members of the Legislative Assembly ==
Year	Member	Party
2008	Chawngtinthanga	INC
2013	Ngurdingliana	INC
2018	Lalrinliana Sailo	MNF
2023	Lalbiakzama	ZPM

== Election results ==
=== 2023 ===
2023 Mizoram Legislative Assembly election: Chalfilh
Party	Candidate	Votes	%	±%
ZPM	Lalbiakzama	6,637	43.26	
MNF	K. Lalhmangaiha	4,804	31.31	
INC	Vanneihthanga	3,731	24.32	
BJP	Dr. Zonuntluanga	97	0.63	
NOTA	None of the Above	72	0.47	
Majority		1,833	11.95	
Turnout				
ZPM gain from MNF		Swing		

=== 2018 ===
2018 Mizoram Legislative Assembly election: Chalfilh
Party	Candidate	Votes	%	±%
MNF	Lalrinliana Sailo	5,541	36.99	New
ZPM	F. Rualhleia	4534	30.27	▼18.02
INC	L. T. Hrangchal	4144	27.67	▼23.17
BJP	P. Sanghmingthanga	678	4.53	New
NOTA	None of the Above	81	0.54	▼0.33
Majority		1007	6.76	
Turnout		14978	80.61	▲0.89
MNF gain from INC		Swing		

=== 2013 ===
2013 Mizoram Legislative Assembly election: Chalfilh
Party	Candidate	Votes	%	±%
INC	Ngurdingliana	7,174	50.84	▲23.53
MPC	L. T. Kima Fanai	3446	24.42	▼8.77
ZNP	J. Lalchhanhima	3368	23.87	New
NOTA	None of the Above	123	0.87	New
Majority		3728	26.65	
Turnout		14111	81.86	▼0.14
INC hold		Swing		

=== 2008 ===
2008 Mizoram Legislative Assembly election: Chalfilh
Party	Candidate	Votes	%	±%
INC	Chawngtinthanga	4,924	37.31	
MPC	Lalvenhima Hmar	4381	33.19	
MNF	J. C. Chhuanliana	3374	25.56	
BJP	C. Ramkinlova	374	2.83	
LB	Vanlalhmingchhuangi	60	0.45	
Independent	J. Neikhuma	46	0.35	
LJP	K. Zothansanga	39	0.30	
Majority		543	4.11	
Turnout		13198	82.0	
INC win (new seat)				
