= Robert Romawia Royte =

Indian politician

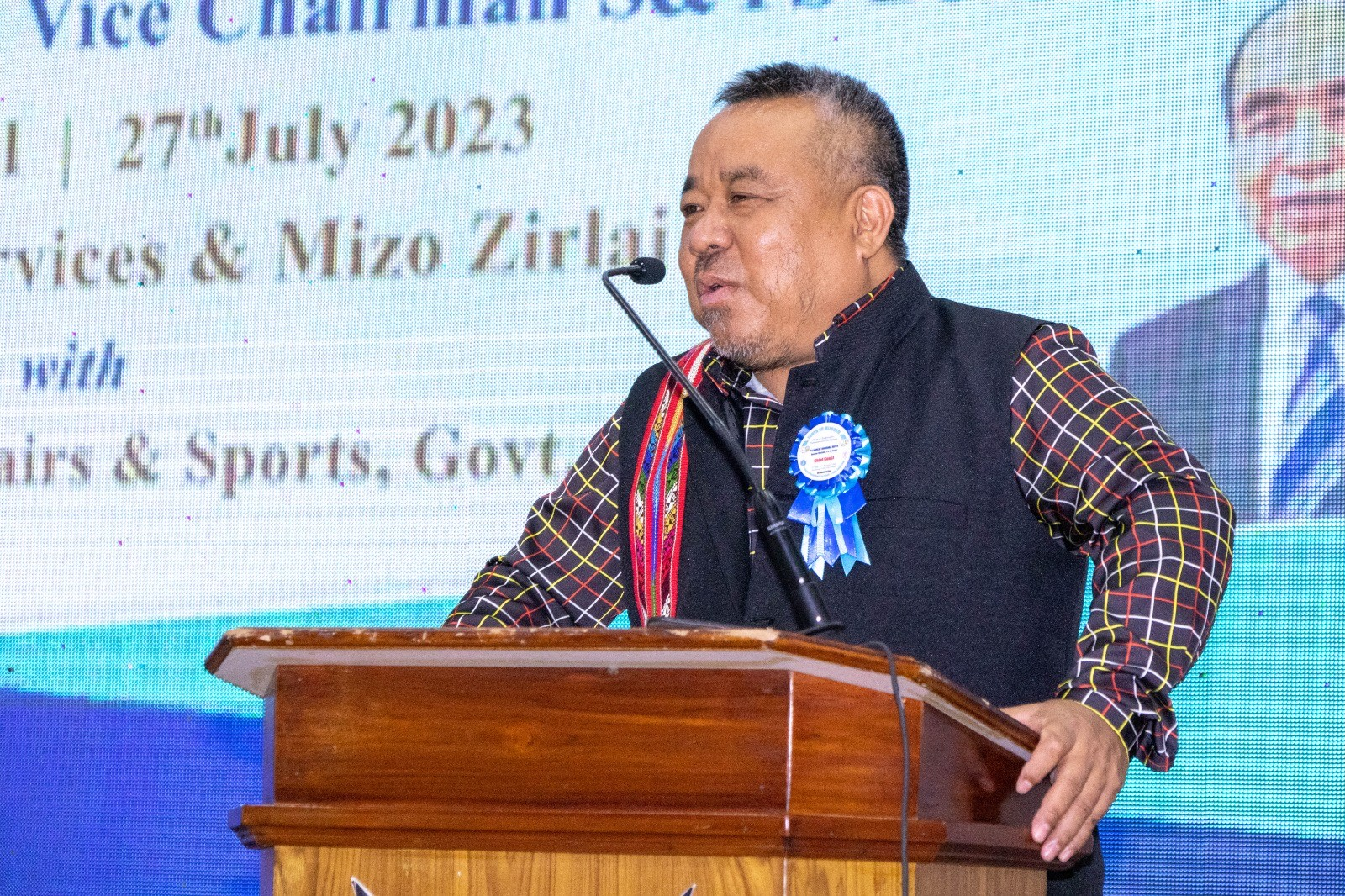
- RRR in 2023

Member of the Mizoram Legislative Assembly for Aizawl East 2
- In office December 2018 – December 2023
- Preceded by: Lalsawta
- Succeeded by: B. Lalchhanzova

Member of the Mizoram Legislative Assembly for Hachhek
- Incumbent
- Assumed office 2023

Personal details
- Born: 29 January 1967 (age 59)
- Party: Mizo National Front (since 2013)
- Education: NEHU

Robert Romawia Royte is an Indian politician from Aizawl, Mizoram. He had been elected to the Mizoram Legislative Assembly in 2018 from the Aizawl East - II Constituency, and from Hachek Constituency from the Mizoram Legislative Assembly in 2023. He was the Minister of State in the MNF ministry and held the portfolios of Sports and Youth Services, Tourism and Information and Communication Technology.

== Personal ==
Robert Romawia is the son of Than Thuama Royte and Lalbiakveli and was born on January 29, 1967. He is married to Lalrampari Hnamte, a high school teacher, and has 4 children.

== Education ==
He completed his M.A. and M.Phil in Political Science at NEHU, Shillong.

== Career ==
He is currently the Minister of State for three departments: Sports and Youth Services, Tourism and Information and Communication Technology.

He is the founder of TT ROYTE Group, and was the proprietor and chief managing director of Northeast Consultancy Services in Aizawl before his career shifted to politics. He is also the owner of I-League champion club Aizawl FC.

== Awards and achievements ==
- Appreciation Certificate for outstanding achievement by Govt. of Nagaland & Nagaland Education Mission Society, 2010.
- “Zothansiamtu Award” All Mizoram Educated Federation Award, 2010.
- Mizo of the Year, 2012, by Lelte Weekly Magazine.
- Award for Most Successful Person in Mizoram, 2013 by Mizoram Periodical Journalist Association, Gen. Hqrs. Aizawl.
- Editor's Award for Excellence by Sports Illustrated Magazine 2018.
- Achiever's Award by Pratidin Time Group 2017.
- National Nagri Award 2019.
- Northeast Man of the Year 2017 by Byatikram Group and Telegraph.
