= Aizawl East 2 Assembly constituency =

Constituency of the Mizoram legislative assembly in India

Coordinates: 23.731°N 92.722°E

Aizawl East 2
- Constituency No. 14 for the Mizoram Legislative Assembly
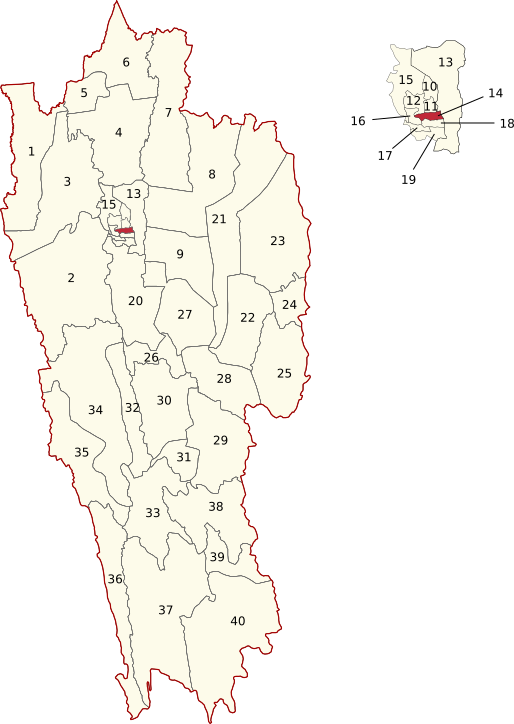

Constituency details
- Country: India
- Region: Northeast India
- State: Mizoram
- District: Aizawl
- Lok Sabha constituency: Mizoram
- Established: 2008
- Total electors: 16,258
- Reservation: ST

Member of Legislative Assembly
- 9th Mizoram Legislative Assembly
- Incumbent B. Lalchhanzova
- Party: Zoram People's Movement
- Elected year: 2023

Aizawl East 2 is one of the 40 Legislative Assembly constituencies of Mizoram state in India.

It comprises wards 18-21 and 27-29 of Aizawl city and is reserved for candidates belonging to the Scheduled Tribes.

== Members of the Legislative Assembly ==
Year	Member	Party
2008	Lalsawta	Indian National Congress
2013	Lalsawta	Indian National Congress
2018	Robert Romawia Royte	Mizo National Front
2023	B. Lalchhanzova	Zoram People's Movement

== Election results ==
=== 2023 ===
2023 Mizoram Legislative Assembly election: Aizawl East 2
Party	Candidate	Votes	%	±%
ZPM	B. Lalchhanzova	7,289	48.41	
MNF	B. Lalawmpuii	4,533	30.11	
NOTA	None of the Above	54	0.36	
Majority				
Turnout		15,057	78.56	
ZPM gain from MNF		Swing		

=== 2018 ===
2018 Mizoram Legislative Assembly election: Aizawl East 2
Party	Candidate	Votes	%	±%
MNF	Robert Romawia Royte	5,869	41.26	
ZPM	B. Lalchhanzova	4,377	30.77	
NOTA	None of the Above	47	0.33	
Majority				
Turnout		14,223	79.94	
MNF gain from INC		Swing		

== See also ==
- List of constituencies of the Mizoram Legislative Assembly
- Aizawl district
