= K. Laldawngliana =

Indian politician

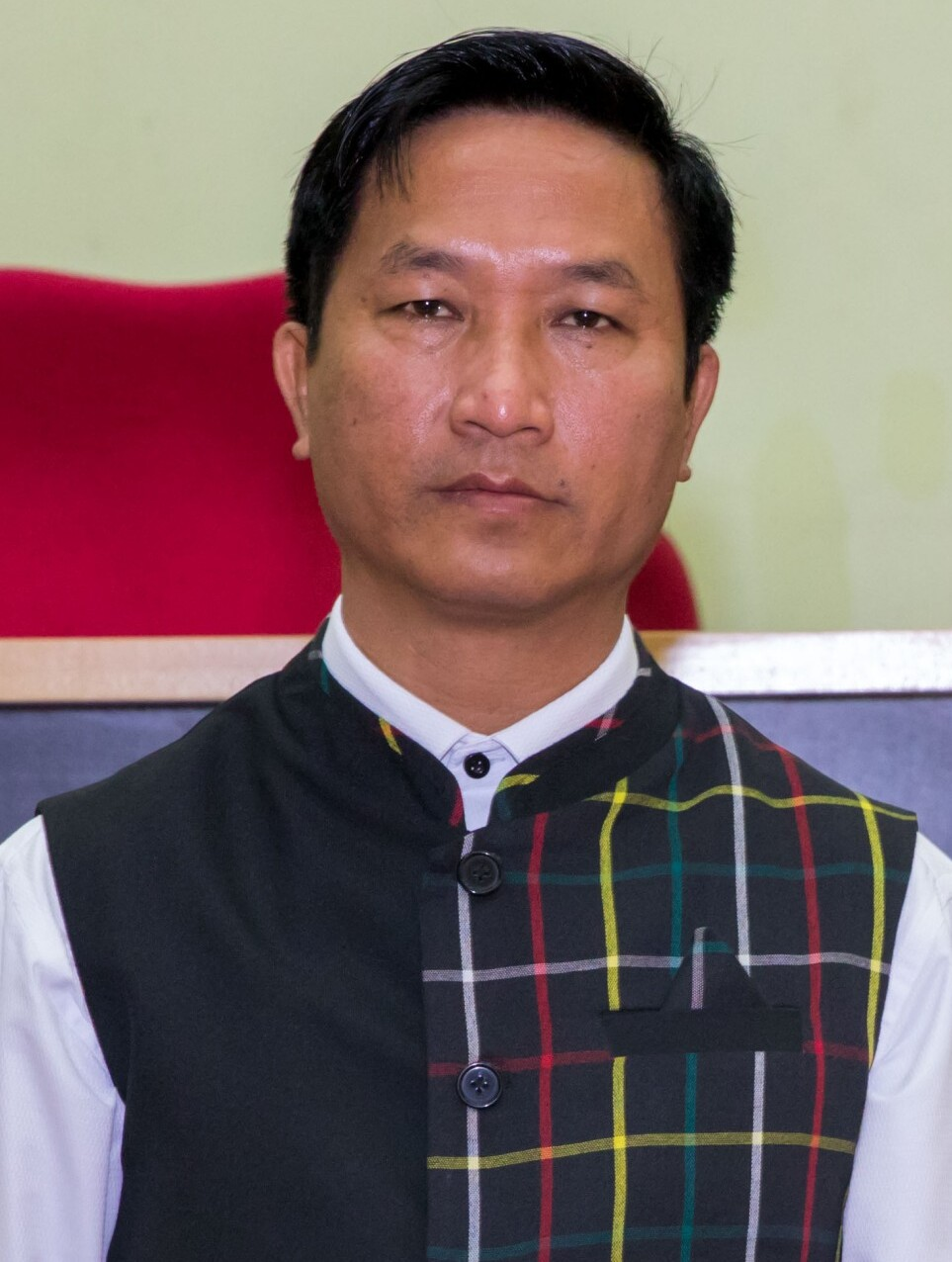
- K Laldawngliana in 2021

Member of Mizoram Legislative Assembly
- Incumbent
- Assumed office 5 November 2021
- Preceded by: Andrew H. Thangliana
- Constituency: Tuirial

Personal details
- Born: 16 September 1972 (age 53)

K. Laldawngliana is an Indian politician who is serving as a member of Mizoram Legislative Assembly from the Tuirial Assembly constituency. He was reelected from the same constituency as a member of the Mizoram Legislative Assembly in December 2023.

== Personal life ==
He was born on 16 September 1972.
