= Lawngtlai East Assembly constituency =

Constituency of the Mizoram legislative assembly in India

Coordinates: 22.750°N 92.958°E

Lawngtlai East
- Constituency No. 38 for the Mizoram Legislative Assembly
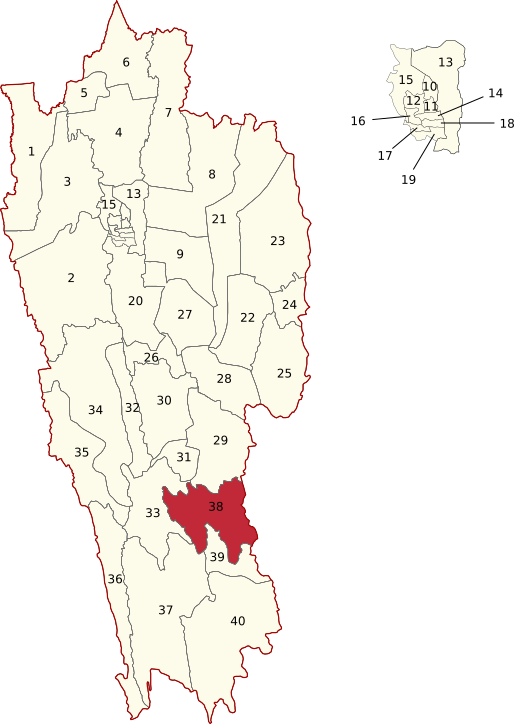

Constituency details
- Country: India
- Region: Northeast India
- State: Mizoram
- District: Lawngtlai
- Lok Sabha constituency: Mizoram
- Established: 2008
- Total electors: 21,234
- Reservation: ST

Member of Legislative Assembly
- 9th Mizoram Legislative Assembly
- Incumbent Lorrain Lalpekliana Chinzah
- Party: Zoram People's Movement
- Elected year: 2023

Lawngtlai East is one of the 40 Legislative Assembly constituencies of Mizoram state in India.

It is part of Lawngtlai district and is reserved for candidates belonging to the Scheduled Tribes.

== Members of the Legislative Assembly ==
Year	Name	Party
2008	H. Zothangliana	Indian National Congress
2013	H. Zothangliana	Indian National Congress
2018	H. Biakzaua	Mizo National Front
2023	Lorrain Lalpekliana Chinzah	Zoram People's Movement

== Election results ==
=== 2023 ===
2023 Mizoram Legislative Assembly election: Lawngtlai East
Party	Candidate	Votes	%	±%
ZPM	Lorrain Lalpekliana Chinzah	10,072	49.66	
MNF	H. Biakzaua	7,971	39.30	
INC	H. Zothangliana	1,761	8.68	
BJP	N.C. Muankima	368	1.81	
NOTA	None of the Above	108	0.53	
Majority		2,101	10.36	
Turnout		20,172	38.9	
ZPM gain from MNF		Swing		

=== 2018 ===
2018 Mizoram Legislative Assembly election: Lawngtlai East
Party	Candidate	Votes	%	±%
MNF	H. Biakzaua	8,656	48.56	
INC	H. Zothangliana	7,712	43.26	
BJP	Vanupa Zathang	1,086	6.09	
Independent	Mc. Lalramchhana	209	1.17	
Independent	C. Biakchhunga	169	0.92	
NOTA	None of the Above	58		
Majority		944	5.3	
Turnout		17,827	78.3	
MNF gain from INC		Swing		

=== 2013 ===
2013 Mizoram Legislative Assembly election: Lawngtlai East
Party	Candidate	Votes	%	±%
INC	H. Zothangliana	8,191	48.90	
MNF	Vanupa Zathang	7,918	47.27	
ZNP	F. Sangdawna	642	3.83	
NOTA	None of the Above	86		
Majority		273	1.6	
Turnout		16,751	78.9	
INC hold		Swing		

=== 2008 ===
2008 Mizoram Legislative Assembly election: Lawngtlai East
Party	Candidate	Votes	%	±%
INC	H. Zothangliana	6,294	41.44	
MNF	H. Rammawi	5,383	35.44	
Independent	Manghmunga Chinzah	3,363	22.14	
Lok Bharati	R. Zoramchhana	62	0.41	
LJP	Zaliana	56	0.37	
Independent	C. Lalbiakthanga	31	0.20	
Majority		911	6.0	
Turnout		15,189	78.2	
INC win (new seat)				
