= F. Lalnunmawia =

Indian politician

Dr. F. Lalnunmawia

Member of the Mizoram Legislative Assembly for Aizawl South 3
- In office December 2018 – December 2023
- Preceded by: KS Thanga
- Succeeded by: Baryl Vanneihsangi

Personal details
- Born: 1973 (age 52–53)
- Party: Mizo National Front (since 2013)
- Education: Mizoram University

Dr. F. Lalnunmawia is a Mizo National Front politician from Mizoram and resides at Samtlang, Aizawl, Mizoram. He represented Aizawl South 3 Constituency in the Mizoram Legislative Assembly from 2018 to 2023. He was an associate professor at Mizoram University prior to his election to the Mizoram Legislative Assembly.

== Education ==
He obtained his M.A. at NEHU, Shillong and his Ph.D. from Mizoram University in Botany.
