= Lalrinawma =

Indian politician

Cabinet Minister of the Mizoram Legislative Assembly
- Incumbent
- Assumed office 20 December 2018
- Constituency: Tuikum

Personal details
- Party: Mizo National Front

Lalrinawma is a Mizo National Front politician from Mizoram. He was elected in Mizoram Legislative Assembly election in 2018 from the Tuikum constituency, as a candidate of the Mizo National Front. He is currently a Cabinet Minister of the Mizoram Legislative Assembly.
