= H. Biakzaua =

Indian politician (born 1965)

Deputy Speaker of the Mizoram Legislative Assembly
- In office 8 February 2023 – 3 December 2023
- Constituency: Lawngtlai East

Personal details
- Born: 15 May 1965 (age 61) Lungtian, Mizoram, India
- Party: Mizo National Front
- Spouse: S. Hmingsangberi

H. Biakzaua (born 15 May 1965) is an Indian politician from Mizoram. He had been elected in the 2018 Mizoram Legislative Assembly election from Lawngtlai East as a candidate of the Mizo National Front. He is a former deputy speaker of the Mizoram Legislative Assembly.

== Early life ==
Biakzaua was born on 15 May 1965 in the village of Lungtian in the Lawngtlai district of Mizoram.

== Political career ==
In the 2018 legislative election, Biakzaua was elected to the MLA from the Lawngtlai East constituency. He was elected deputy speaker of the Mizoram Legislative Assembly on 8 February 2023.

== Personal life ==
Biakzaua is married to S. Hmingsangberi, and they have four children.
