= Lalrinliana Sailo =

Indian politician

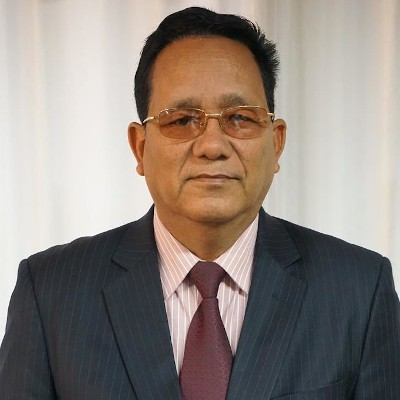
- Lalrinliana Sailo in 2020

Speaker of the Mizoram Legislative Assembly
- In office 17 December 2018 – 3 December 2023
- Constituency: Chalfilh

Personal details
- Party: Bharatiya Janata Party (2023-present); Mizo National Front (2018-2023) Indian National Congress (till 2018)
- Spouse: T.Lalthangpuii

Lalrinliana Sailo is a Bharatiya Janata Party politician from Mizoram. He was elected in the 2018 Mizoram Legislative Assembly election from Chalfilh as a candidate of the Mizo National Front. He is a former speaker of Mizoram Legislative Assembly. Prior to this, he served as Health Minister during the Congress' reign and had already been elected as an MLA even before that. He is one of the most well-known political figures in Mizoram. He joined the BJP on 12 October 2023.
