= Fifth Lal Thanhawla ministry =

Council of Ministers of Mizoram (2013–2018)

- 12th Ministry of Mizoram

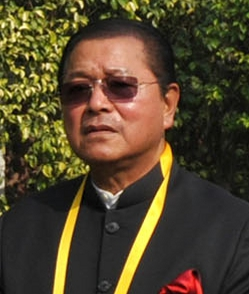
- Chief Minister Pu Lal Thanhawla
- Date formed: 14 December 2013
- Date dissolved: 14 December 2018

People and organisations
- Governor: Vakkom Purushothaman (until 2014); Kamla Beniwal (2014); Vinod Kumar Duggal (2014); Krishan Kant Paul (2014–2015); Aziz Qureshi (2015); Keshari Nath Tripathi (2015); Nirbhay Sharma (2015–2018); Kummanam Rajasekharan (2018)
- Chief Minister: Lal Thanhawla
- Member parties: Indian National Congress
- Status in legislature: Majority

History
- Election: 2013
- Outgoing election: 2018
- Legislature term: 5 years
- Predecessor: Lal Thanhawla IV
- Successor: Zoramthanga III

The Fifth Lal Thanhawla ministry was the 12th council of ministers of the Indian state of Mizoram and the fifth ministry under chief minister Pu Lal Thanhawla of the Indian National Congress which was formed on 14 December 2013 following the party's decisive victory in the state legislative assembly election. Chief Minister Lal Thanhawla returned to power for a consecutive second term and was sworn-in into office along with his cabinet on 14 December 2013 by Governor Vakkom Purushothaman.

The ministry remained in office until the party's defeat in the 2018 election and the subsequent resignation of the chief minister.

== Background ==
The ruling Indian National Congress party under the leadership of chief minister Lal Thanhawla returned to power for a second consecutive term after winning 34 of the 40 seats in the Mizoram Legislative Assembly. Following the party's victory, the chief minister was re-elected as the party's leader in the legislative assembly and subsequently sworn-in into office as chief minister for the fifth term.

== Cabinet formation and reshuffle ==
The cabinet was formed on 14 December 2013, composed of eleven ministers who were sworn-in into office along with the chief minister. Seven ministers held cabinet rank which included R. Lalzirliana, R. Romawia, Lalsawta, H. Rohluna, Zodintluanga Ralte, P. C. Lalthanliana, and John Rotluangliana, while four ministers were sworn-in as ministers of state which included Lal Thanzara, Lalrinmawia Ralte, C. Ngunlianchunga, and Buddha Dhan Chakma. The portfolios were assigned on 16 December 2013.

Minister of State (Independent Charge) for Fisheries and Sericulture Buddha Dhan Chakma resigned from the council of ministers on 21 August 2017 in protest against the denial of medical seats to ethnic Chakma tribe students. A cabinet reshuffle was carried out in the following month, on 20 September, in which Lal Thanzara was promoted to cabinet rank, and two ministers of state were inducted which included K.S. Thanga and Vanlalawmpuii Chawngthu, while Lalrinmawia Ralte was dropped from the cabinet.

On 14 October 2018, Home Minister R. Lalzirliana resigned from the cabinet.

== Ministers ==
=== Cabinet Ministers ===
Portfolio	Minister	Took office	Left office	Party
Chief Minister and also incharge of: Department of Political and Cabinet; Department of Vigilance; Department of General Administration; Department of Secretariat Administration; Department of Personnel and Administrative Reforms; Department of District Council and Minority Affairs; All other departments not assigned to any other Minister.	Lal Thanhawla	14 December 2013	14 December 2018	INC
Minister of Power and Electricity	Lal Thanhawla, CM	14 December 2013	27 September 2017	INC
Minister of Power and Electricity	R. Lalzirliana	27 September 2017	14 October 2018	INC
Minister of Power and Electricity	Lal Thanhawla, CM	14 October 2018	14 December 2018	INC
Minister of Information and Public Relations; Minister of Public Works	Lal Thanhawla	14 December 2013	27 September 2017	INC
Minister of Information and Public Relations; Minister of Public Works	Lal Thanzara	27 September 2017	14 December 2018	INC
Minister of Home (including Prisons, Sainik Welfare and Resettlements); Minister of Rural Development; Minister of Excise and Narcotics	R. Lalzirliana	14 December 2013	14 October 2018	INC
Minister of Home (including Prisons, Sainik Welfare and Resettlements); Minister of Rural Development; Minister of Excise and Narcotics	Lal Thanhawla, CM	14 October 2018	14 December 2018	INC
Minister of Agriculture	R. Lalzirliana	14 December 2013	27 September 2017	INC
Minister of Agriculture	K. S. Thanga, MoS (I/C)	27 September 2017	14 December 2018	INC
Minister of Higher and Technical Education; Minister of Art and Culture; Minister of Land Revenue and Settlement; Minister of Parliamentary Affairs	R. Romawia	14 December 2013	14 December 2018	INC
Minister of Finance; Minister of Planning and Programme Implementation; Minister of Taxation; Minister of Law and Judicial	Lalsawta	14 December 2013	14 December 2018	INC
Minister of School Education; Minister of Commerce and Industries (including Geology and Mineral Resources)	H. Rohluna	14 December 2013	14 December 2018	INC
Minister of Urban Development and Poverty Alleviation; Minister of Sports and Youth Services; Minister of Public Health Engineering	Zodintluanga Ralte	14 December 2013	14 December 2018	INC
Minister of Horticulture; Minister of Local Administration; Minister of Social Welfare	P. C. Lalthanliana	14 December 2013	14 December 2018	INC
Minister of Food, Civil Supplies and Consumer Affairs; Minister of Transport; Minister of Tourism	John Rotluangliana	14 December 2013	14 December 2018	INC
Minister of Health and Family Welfare	Lal Thanzara, MoS (I/C)	14 December 2013	27 September 2017	INC
Minister of Health and Family Welfare	Lal Thanzara	27 September 2017	14 December 2018	INC
Minister of Information and Communication Technology	Lal Thanzara, MoS (I/C)	14 December 2013	27 September 2017	INC
Minister of Information and Communication Technology	Zodintluanga Ralte	27 September 2017	14 December 2018	INC
Minister of Environment, Forest and Climate Change	Lalrinmawia Ralte, MoS (I/C)	14 December 2013	27 September 2017	INC
Minister of Environment, Forest and Climate Change	Lal Thanhawla, CM	27 September 2017	14 December 2018	INC
Minister of Labour, Employment, Skill Development and Entrepreneurship	Lalrinmawia Ralte, MoS (I/C)	14 December 2013	27 September 2017	INC
Minister of Labour, Employment, Skill Development and Entrepreneurship	H. Rohluna	27 September 2017	14 December 2018	INC

=== Ministers of State ===
Portfolio	Minister	Took office	Left office	Party
Minister of State (Independent Charge) of Cooperation	Lalrinmawia Ralte	14 December 2013	27 September 2017	INC
Minister of State (Independent Charge) of Cooperation	Vanlalawmpuii	27 September 2017	14 December 2018	INC
Minister of State (Independent Charge) of Land Resources, Soil and Water Conservation	Lalrinmawia Ralte	14 December 2013	27 September 2017	INC
Minister of State (Independent Charge) of Land Resources, Soil and Water Conservation	K.S. Thanga	27 September 2017	14 December 2018	INC
Minister of State (Independent Charge) of Animal Husbandry and Veterinary; Minister of State (Independent Charge) of Disaster Management and Rehabilitation; Minister of State (Independent Charge) of Printing and Stationery	C. Ngunlianchunga	14 December 2013	14 December 2018	INC
Minister of State (Independent Charge) of Sericulture; Minister of State (Independent Charge) of Fisheries	Buddha Dhan Chakma	14 December 2013	21 August 2017	INC
Minister of State (Independent Charge) of Sericulture; Minister of State (Independent Charge) of Fisheries	Vanlalawmpuii	27 September 2017	14 December 2018	INC
Minister of State for Public Works; Minister of State for Power and Electricity	Lal Thanzara	14 December 2013	27 September 2017	INC
