= Miss Mizoram =

Beauty pageant in Mizoram, India

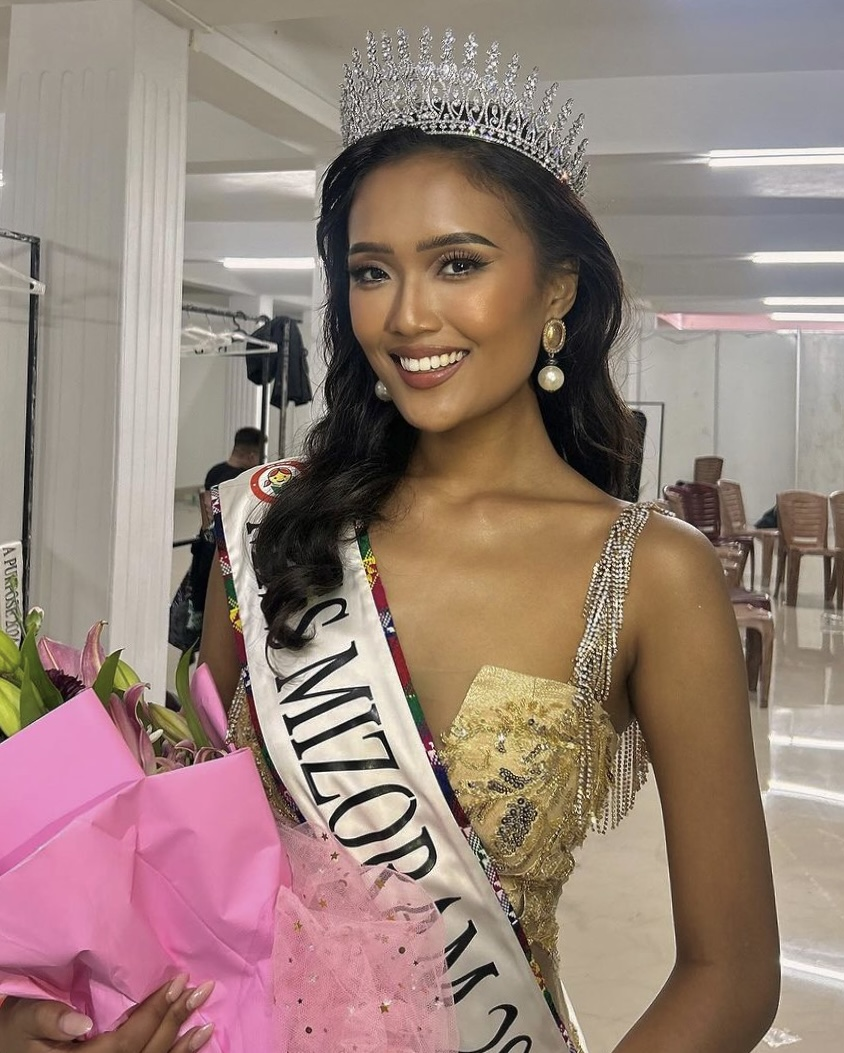
- Jennifer Renthlei, Miss Mizoram 2024
- Formation: 1983
- Type: Beauty Pageant
- Headquarters: Aizawl
- Location: Mizoram, India
- Official language: English, Mizo
- Company: Zonet TV Pvt.Ltd, Mizoram Journalists Association
- Key people: LV Lalthantluanga, Owner Zonet
- Budget: 20 Lakhs

Miss Mizoram is a beauty pageant contest for single women in the State of Mizoram in India.

After its inception, the pageant was organized by the Mizoram Journalists Association. After reaching its 10th year, Lelte Weekly, a weekly magazine, took over its organization. In 2014, IHM has served as the main organizer and was later franchised by Zonet TV Pvt Ltd with association of Mizoram Journalists Association.

The latest edition of Miss Mizoram was concluded on 26 April 2024. Jennifer Lalrinzuali Renthlei from Aizawl was crowned as the new Miss Mizoram.

== Title Holders ==
Edition	Miss Mizoram	1st Runner Up	2nd Runner Up
2024	Jennifer Lalrinzuali Renthlei	Evelyn Zachhingpuii	Rebecca Zothanpuii
2020	Zirsangpuii	Baby Zomuanpuii	Lalmuansangi Varte
2018	T. Ramthanmawii	C. Lallawmzuali	Malsawmsangi
2017	Rody H Vanlalhriatpuii	Esther vanlalnunpuii Sailo	Lalmalsawmi
2014	H. Lalchhanhimi (Dethroned)	C. Vanlalmalsawmi (Assumed)	Lalruatfeli

== Miss Mizoram 2014 ==
After nine years of hiatus, the Miss Mizoram 2014 Pageant was held at Aizawl,. Hundreds of women applied for the pageant. The field was narrowed to 20 and then 16. These 16 women competed in a preliminary swimsuit, talent, and fashion show. An online vote was held to determine the Miss Photogenic and People's Choice Awards.

The winner was H. Lalchhanhimi. However, she was later dethroned for getting married during her reign. The 1st Runner Up, C. Vanlalmalsawmi, became Miss Mizoram 2014.

C. Vanlalmalsawmi (1st Runner Up Later Miss Mizoram) represented Mizoram at Sunsilk Mega Miss North-East 2014 Pageant in which she was one of the Top 10 Semi-Finalist. She was previously Miss Govt. Aizawl College. She later participated at the Miss Luit Pageant where she finished the pageant as the 1st Runner Up. She also participated at the Manappuram Miss Queen of India 2015 pageant in which she is one of the Top 12 Semi-Finalist and also won the Miss India East Award at the said pageant. She later competed at Miss Northeast Diva 2020 (A preliminary pageant for Miss Diva - Miss Universe India) and finished as the 2nd Runner Up.

=== Results ===
Miss Mizoram 2014	H. Lalchhanhimi (Dethroned)
1st Runner Up	C. Vanlalmalsawmi (Assumed)
2nd Runner Up	Lalruatfeli
Top 5	Lalruatfeli Royte Christina Lalhmingthangi
Top 10	Laltanpuii Ngurthanpuii Sailo Vansangkimi Lalhriatpuii Vanlalhruaii Hlondo

=== Contestants ===
The final 16 contestants were:

Name	Placement at Miss Mizoram 2014
Lalhriatpuii	Top 10 Semi-Finalist
Laltanpuii	Top 10 Semi-Finalist
Zonunmawii	-
Christina Lalhmingthangi	Top 5 Finalist
Zodinhlui	-
Ngurthanpuii Sailo ( Top 5 at Sunsilk Mega Miss Northeast 2013	Top 10 Semi-Finalist
Vansangkimi ( Miss Govt Aizawl College (GAC) 1st Runner Up 2013-14	Top 10 Semi-Finalist
Lalruatfeli	2nd Runner Up
Lalchhanchhuahi	-
C.Vanlalmalsawmi ( Miss Govt Aizawl College (GAC) 2013-14 / Miss Northeast Diva 2nd Runner Up 2019	1st Runner Up Later assumed the title of Miss Mizoram 2014
Vanlalhruaii Hlondo	Top 10 Semi-Finalist
Lalruatfeli Royte	Top 5 Finalist
Biti Soren	-
H. Lalchhanhimi	Miss Mizoram 2014 Dethroned
Ramthanmawii	-
Naom VL Hmangaihzuali	-

=== Sub-Title Awards ===
Miss Photogenic	Laltanpuii
Miss Congeniality	Vansangkimi
Miss Catwalk	Biti Soren
Miss Talented	Lalruatfeli Royte
Miss Personality	Lalruatfeli Royte
Miss Perfect 10	Lalhriatpuii
Miss Beautiful Smile	C. Vanlalmalsawmi
Miss Beautiful Hair	Zodinhlui
Miss Beautiful Skin	Ngurthanpuii Sailo
People's Choice	Vansangkimi

== Miss Mizoram 2017 ==
The Miss Mizoram 2017 Grand Finale was held on 10 March 2017 at Mizoram University Multipurpose Auditorium. Rody H Vanlalhriatpuii of Lawngtlai representing Lawngtlai District was crowned the new Miss Mizoram 2017.

Vanlalhriatpuii later represented Mizoram at Femina Miss India and completed as top 15 finalists. She also won Miss Popular and Miss Talented.

Results	Names	Location	District
Miss Mizoram 2017	Rody H.Vanlalhriatpuii (Previously won Miss Govt Zirtiri Residential Sc College GZRSC 2011)	Lawngtlai Bazar Veng	Lawngtlai
Miss Mizoram 2017 1st Runner up	Esther Vanlalnunpuii Sailo (Previously won Miss Govt Aizawl College GAC 2015)	Zemabawk	Aizawl
Miss Mizoram 2017 2nd Runner Up	Lalmalsawmi	Lunglei Salem Veng	Lunglei
Top 5	Catherine Lallawmsangi (Previously won Miss Govt Aizawl College GAC 2016): Sharon Vanlalhruaii	Aizawl	Aizawl

=== Contestants ===
- Lalbiakhlui - Top 10
- C.Lalrinchhuangi - Top 10
- K.Lalzirtluangi - Top 10
- Lalhlimpuii
- V.Lalnunpuii - Top 10
- Sharon Vanlalhruaii - Top 5
- Malsawmdawngliani Zote - Top 10
- Lalramnghaki
- Lalchhuansangi
- C.Vanhlupuii
- Catherine Lallawmsangi - Top 5
- Zothanmawii
- Rody.H.Vanlalhriatpuii - Miss Mizoram 2017
- Lalmalsawmi - 2nd Runner Up
- Esther Vanlalnunpuii Sailo - 1st Runner Up
- Lalnunpuii

== Miss Mizoram 2018 ==
The Miss Mizoram 2018 Grand Finale was held in Mizoram University Auditorium on 7 March 2018. Thirteen women participated. The winner was T. Ramthanmawii of North Khawbung.

=== Results ===
Results	Names	Remarks
Miss Mizoram 2018	T.Ramthanmawii	-Previously Competed at Miss Mizoram 2014 but was Unplaced. -Previously won Miss Govt Aizawl College (GAC) 2017
Miss Mizoram 2017 1st Runner up	C.Lallawmzuali	-Previously won Miss Pachhunga University College (PUC) 2016
Miss Mizoram 2017 2nd Runner Up	CT Malsawmsangi	
Top 5	Lily Lalremkimi Darnei; Josephine Lalnunfeli	-Lily Lalremkimi Darnei was crowned fbb Colours Femina Miss India Mizoram 2018 and was placed in the Top 12 of the pageant and won Miss Iron Maiden Subtitle at the Grand Finale Event and won 3 subtitles Miss Body Beautiful, Miss Fashion Icon & Miss Congeniality Sub Titles at the fbb Colours Femina Miss India East Zonal/Region Pageant -Josephine was crowned as the Runner up of Miss Govt Aizawl College (GAC) 2016

=== Contestants ===
The final 13 contestants are

Name	Placement at Miss Mizoram 2018
Lalremruatpuii	-
Lalphirthangi	Top 8 Semi-Finalist
KC lalhmunsiami	Top 8 Semi-Finalist
Malsawmtluangi	-
Laldintluangi	Top 8 Semi-Finalist
Lily Lalremkimi Darnei	Top 5 Finalist
Lalnunnemi	-
T.Ramthanmawii	Miss Mizoram 2018
Josephine Lalnunfeli	Top 5 Finalist
Emalie Lalchhanchhuahi	-
C.Lallawmzuali	1st Runner Up
CT Malsawmsangi	2nd Runner Up
Evelyn Zachhingpuii	Withdrew during the process of the competition

== Miss Mizoram 2020 ==
The RFL Plastic Miss Mizoram 2020 Grand Finale was held on 14 March 2020 at R.Dengthuama Indoor Stadium in Mualpui, Aizawl. Hosted by Rini Hlondo and broadcast by Zonet tv.17, 17 women competed; ten were districts winner and seven from an audition in Aizawl. The winner was Zirsangpuii of Khawzawl, Vengthar (Miss Mizoram 2020 Khawzawl District ).

=== Results ===
Results	Name
Miss Mizoram 2020	Zirsangpuii
1st runner-up	Baby Zomuanpuii Fanai
2nd runner-up	Lalmuansangi Varte - She was later crowned as VLCC Femina Miss India Mizoram 2020 where she won the Miss Glamorous Look subtitle award.
Top-6	Saizampuii Lalramhlui Sailo - Hlui was crowned as Femina Miss India Mizoram 2022 where she won the Miss Beautiful Skin subtitle award. C.Lalhmangaihzuali - Zuali was also later crowned as Femina Miss India Mizoram 2023.
Top-12	Jacelyn Lynanokhai Solo B.Lalthuthlungthari R.Lalsangzeli Sylvia Lalvenpuii Fiona Lalthahlui Lalhriatchhungi Sailo

=== Sub Title Awards ===
Subtitle	Winner
Miss Refreshing Beauty	Fiona Lalthahlui
Miss Photogenic	R.Lalsangzeli
Miss Active	Baby Zomuanpuii Fanai
Miss Body Beautiful	Baby Zomuanpuii Fanai
Miss Ramp-walk	C.Lalhmangaihzuali
Miss Talented	Lalmuansangi Varte
Miss Personality	Lalhriatchhungi Sailo
Miss Congeniality	Lalhnaihzuali Fanai
Miss Beautiful Skin	Lalramhlui Sailo
Beauty with a purpose	Saizampuii
People Choice	Saizampuii

=== Contestants ===
Name	Address	Height	Age	District
Abigail Lawmsangzuali	Saikhamakawn Aizawl	5'6 ft	19	Aizawl
B.Lalthuthlungthari	Sangau		19	Miss Mizoram Lawngtlai District
Baby Zomuanpuii Fanai	Zawlnuam	5'8 ft		Miss Mizoram Mamit District
C.Lalhmangaihzuali (Miss Govt Johnson College, Aizawl 2022)	Bungkawn, Aizawl	5'7 ft	20	Aizawl
Fiona Lalthahlui	Venglai,Saitual	5'6 ft	18	Miss Mizoram Saitual District
Hs.Ramdinthari	Seling			Aizawl
Jacelyn Lynanokhai Solo	Meisavaih West, Siaha	5'5 ft	26	Miss Mizoram Siaha District
Lalhnaihzuali Fanai	Electric veng, Hnahthial	5'9 ft	21	Miss Mizoram Hnahthial District
Lalhriatchhungi Sailo	Ngopa	5'7 ft	23	
Lalmuansangi Varte	Zotlang, Champhai	5'6 ft	25	Miss Mizoram Champhai District
Lalramhlui Sailo	Venghlui, Aizawl	5'7 ft	19	Aizawl
R.Lalsangzeli	Thenhlum	6'1 ft	21	Miss Mizoram Lunglei District
Ruthi Lalrinfeli	Vairengte Banglaveng	5'5 ft	20	Miss Mizoram Kolasib District
Saizampuii	Keitum	5'7 ft	25	Miss Mizoram Serchhip District
Sarah Lalremruati (Miss Women Ploytecnic Aizawl 2019)	Thingdawl Vengthar	5'8 ft	19	Kolasib
Sylvia Lalvenpuii	Sethlun, Lunglei	5'8 ft	21	Lunglei
Zirsangpuii	Vengthar, Khawzawl	5'5 ft	23	Miss Mizoram Khawzawl District

=== Judges ===
- 1. Vanlalrema Vantawl - Former MJA President
- 2. Rody H.Vanlalhriatpuii - Miss Mizoram 2017
- 3. Lucy Sailo - Professional Designers
- 4. Susan Ralte

== Miss Mizoram 2024 ==
The WCD Miss Mizoram 2024 Grand Finale was held on 26 April 2024 at Saizahawla Indoor Stadium in Tanhril, Aizawl. Hosted by Rini Hlondo and broadcast by Zonet tv.17, 18 women competed; ten were districts winner and eight from an open audition in Aizawl. Jennifer Larinzuali Renthlei was crowned as the new Miss Mizoram at the end of the event.

=== Results ===
Miss Mizoram 2024	Jennifer Lalrinzuali Renthlei
1st Runner Up	Evelyn Zachhingpuii
2nd Runner Up	Rebecca Zothanpuii
Top 5	Lalrinhlui Lalhmingsangi
Top 10	H.Lalhriatpuii Lalsangkimi Judith Lalramengmawii L. Lalnuntluangi T. Lalmuanpuii

=== Judges ===
- 1. Vanlalrema Vantawl - Former MJA President
- 2. Nunui Rualhleng - Miss India Mizoram 2019
- 3. Brigette Zohmingi
- 4. Lalbiakzaua

=== Contestants ===
Name	Address	Height	Age	District
PC Lalruatsangi (Miss Mizoram Saitual 2024)	Dawrveng, Saitual	5'6 ½ ft	20	Saitual
M. Lalrinchhani (Miss Mizoram Siaha 2024)	Siaha	5'7 ft	20	Siaha
L. Lalnuntluangi (Miss Mizoram Lawngtlai 2024)	Lawngtlai	5'8 ft	20	Lawngtlai
R. Vanlalawmpuii (Miss Mizoram Serchhip 2024 Miss Govt Serchhip College 2022-23)	Khawte Tlang, New Serchhip	5’5 ft	20	Serchhip
Rebecca Zothanpuii (Miss Mizoram Khawzawl 2024/ Khawzawl's Miss Chapchar Kut 2024/ Miss Govt Hrangbana College 1st Runner Up 2019-20)	Khawzawl			Khawzawl
Lalhmingsangi (Miss Mizoram Kolasib 2024)	Kolasib			Kolasib
Hmangaihzuali (Miss Mizoram Mamit 2024)	Mamit			Mamit
Jennifer Zothanzuali (Miss Mizoram Lunglei 2024)	Lunglei			Lunglei
Lalrinhlui (Miss Mizoram Champhai 2024)	Kahrawt, Champhai	5’7 ft	19	Champhai
H. Zohmingthangi (Miss Mizoram Hnahthial 2024)	Bualpui H	5'7 ft	18	Hnahthial
Evelyn Zachhingpuii (Miss Universe Mizoram 2025/ Miss Pachhunga University College (PUC) 1st Runner Up 2019)	Saikhamakawn			Aizawl
H.Lalhriatpuii (Miss Northeast 2022 Top 8)	Kanan Veng	5’8 ft	21	Aizawl
Jennifer Lalrinzuali (Miss Northeast 2023 2nd RU / Miss Govt Aizawl College 2022)	Republic Veng	5’9 ft	23	Aizawl
Judith Lalramengmawii	ITI Veng	5'6 ft	18	Aizawl
Lalsangkimi ( Femina Miss India Mizoram 2024 / Miss Student Nurses Association (SNA) Mizoram 1st Runner Up 2023/ Miss Synod College of Nursing 2023)	Dinthar			Aizawl
T. Lalmuanpuii	Zemabawk North			Aizawl
Vanlalchhuangi	Vaivakawn			Aizawl
Vanlalhriatpuii	Ainawn Veng			Aizawl

=== Sub Title Awards ===
Subtitle	Winner
Miss Personality	Evelyn Zachhingpuii
Miss Photogenic	Jennifer Lalrinzuali
Miss Active	Judith Lalramengmawii
Miss Body Beautiful	Evelyn Zachhingpuii
Miss Ramp-walk	Jennifer Lalrinzuali
Miss Talented	M. Lalrinchhani
Miss Congeniality	Jennifer Zothanzuali (Miss Mizoram Lunglei)
Miss Beautiful Skin	Lalrinhlui (Miss Mizoram Champhai)
Beauty with a purpose	R. Vanlalawmpuii (Miss Mizoram Serchhip)
People's Choice	Lalhmingsangi (Miss Mizoram Kolasib)

== Notes ==
Ngurthanpuii Sailo (Miss beautiful skin and Top 10 Semi-Finalist) represented Mizoram at Sunsilk Mega Miss North-East 2013 Pageant in which she placed as the Top 5 Finalist.

Lalhriatpuii (Miss perfect 10 and Top 10 Semi-Finalist) later established herself as a successful air hostess.

Lily Lalremkimi Darnei (Top 5 at Miss Mizoram 2018) was crowned as fbb colours Femina Miss India Mizoram 2018 and won 3 sub Titles at Femina Miss India East Zonal Pageant and Miss Iron Maiden subtitle at the Grand Finale night and she was one of the Top 12 Semi-Finalist at the Grand Finale.

Lalnunthari Rualhleng ( Nunui Rualhleng) a model from Mizoram was crowned fbb colors Femina Miss India Mizoram 2019. She won 2 subtitles at the Femina Miss India East Zonal Pageant and 2 other subtitles at the Grand Finale night. She was selected as one of the Top 12 Semi-Finalist
