= Saikhamakawn =

Locality in Aizawl, Mizoram, India

- Locality
- Location in Mizoram
- Coordinates: 23.709°N 92.719°E
- Country: India
- State: Mizoram
- District: Aizawl
- City: Aizawl
- Ward: XIX

Government
  - Type: Local Council
- Time zone: UTC+5:30 (IST)
- PIN: 796005
- Vehicle registration: MZ

Saikhamakawn is a locality (veng) in the southern part of Aizawl, the capital of the Indian state of Mizoram. It is one of the localities of Ward XIX of the Aizawl Municipal Corporation. Its institutions include the Government Saikhamakawn Middle School, which was established in 1985. Saikhamakawn FC, a club from this city, competes in the Mizoram Premier League, which is the top division of football in the state.
