= Serchhip Thalai Pawl =

Indian nonprofit organization

- Founded: 21 November 2010
- Founder: Administrators of Serchhip Facebook Users Group
- Type: Society
- Purpose: Economically Backward and Socially Marginalised People
- Location: Serchhip
- Region served: Mizoram and all other parts of India.
- Method: Volunteering
- Members: 200
- Volunteers: 200

Serchhip Thalai Pawl (English: Serchhip Youth Club) is a registered Indian not-for-profit non-governmental organisation involved in charitable activities in and around Serchhip Town and Serchhip district in the state of Mizoram in India. It was founded in 2010 by a group of Social-networking sites users as the Serchhip Facebook Users Group. The main aims and objects of the organisation is to provide better social, legal and medical services and facilities to economically backward and socially marginalised people irrespective of their tribe, caste or belief. They also involved in the capacity building of youth and voluntarism.

== History ==
In November 2010, a group of social-networking sites users who are using Facebook and other sites like Orkut, etc. have in mind that some social activities must be done outside of their computer room. So, they decided to form an organisation and role-out their plan of activities. Their first activity was making contribution by members and distributed the money to economically backward people living in Serchhip Town, irrespective of their tribe, caste or belief. In the early years, they use Serchhip Facebook Users Group abbreviated as SFUG, which is not desirable due to many concerns like using the registered trademark, Facebook, may have legal issues. So, the meeting of the Governing Body of the society on 28 September 2013 changed the name to "Serchhip Thalai Pawl".

== Activities ==
=== 2010 ===
Contributions made by the members were distributed to selected economically backward families within Serchhip Town. A Christmas Card, specially designed for families who have lost their love ones during 2010, were given to them by visiting in their houses.

=== 2011 ===
Serchhip Thalai Pawl has organised Winterfest for youth on 29 December 2012. Hundreds of youth from all parts of the town gathered there.

=== 2012 ===
On 14 February 2013 (Valentine's Day), Serchhip Thalai Pawl has organised a voluntary blood donation camp in JN Hospital, Serchhip. 27 boys and 18 girls have voluntarily donated blood on the camp.

== Branches ==
Branch of Serchhip Thalai Pawl can be formed in any village, town or city, except within Serchhip town area, where more than 10 or more existing members are living there or going to stay there for more than one year. It is not allowed to form more than one branch in a village, town or city. The first branch was formed in Aizawl on 16 February 2012.

== Clubs ==
A club can be formed by five or more members (but not exceeding 20 members) who are sharing or having common interest, activity or subject. Any number of clubs can be formed anywhere Serchhip Thalai Pawl members are, even within Serchhip town area.
