= Vanglaini =

Newspaper in Mizoram, India

- Vanglaini
- Type: Daily newspaper
- Format: Broadsheet
- Owner: K. Sapdanga
- Founded: 1978; 47 years ago
- Language: Mizo
- Headquarters: Aizawl, India
- Circulation: 45,000
- Price: INR 3
- Website: www.vanglaini.org

Vanglaini is a daily newspaper in Mizoram, northeast India, published in the Mizo language. It is registered with the Registrar of Newspapers for India (no. RNI 34227/79. : MZR/67/2012-2014). It is owned, edited, and published by K. Sapdanga. It remains the newspaper in Mizoram with the largest circulation.

== Mizo Award ==
Vanglaini has instituted the "Mizo Award" to any living Mizo or group of Mizos who have made exemplary achievements. The first award was given in 2011, and was scheduled to be given every three years. The award carried INR 100,000 with a trophy. From 2017, the award money was doubled to INR 200,000.

=== Recipients ===
- 2011, Brig T. Sailo, retired Indian Army officer and former Chief Minister of Mizoram.
- 2014, Sângthankima, social worker and humanitarian who founded Thutak Nunpuitu Team.
- 2017, Joy Pachuau, professor of history at Jawaharlal Nehru University, and author of Being Mizo and The Camera as Witness: A Social History of Mizoram, among others.

== Controversy ==
At the 17th Lok Sabha election, Vanglaini published a list of candidates for Mizoram constituency on 11 April 2019, the day of voting. The electoral symbol of Mizo National Front party candidate C. Lalrosanga was given as Ni (Sun) in place of arsi (a star). MNF, the legislature party of Mizoram, was infuriated, as its president and Chief Minister Zoramthanga reacted, saying, "This is done either deliberately or purposefully to undermine the MNF party and our candidate because the editor of the paper is the leader of our opponent and the joint editor himself is ZPM-Congress joint candidate." They also asserted that the newspaper had misprinted their symbol in the past election.

The main rival of MNF was Tetea Hmar, who contested as an independent candidate but officially supported by the Mizoram Pradesh Congress Committee (representative of the Indian National Congress) and Zoram People's Movement parties. Vanglaini had a close link with ZPM; Hmar being its joint editor, and K. Sapdanga, the editor, was the leader of ZPM. Hmar was popular as a favourite candidate as "Mipui Candidate" or the "People Candidate."

Although Sapdanga publicised an apology through WhatsApp on the same day, stating it was an inadvertent mistake. He officially submitted an explanation to the election officials, as well as to Rosanga, who accepted the apology. However, the MNF demanded apology for their own which they did not receive, claiming that it was not only a "deliberate act" to mislead voters, but also a breach of the election code of conduct. The Chief Electoral Officer Ashish Kundra directed the Returning Officer Vanlalngaihsaka to file the first information report to the police. The police issued order to show cause to Hmar and Sapdanga. Hmar and Sapdanga were registered for criminal offences under sections 171-F and 171-G of the Indian Penal Code "for allegedly deliberately publishing a misleading report."

ZPM and Congress parties were in turn angered by such actions, claiming that Hmar had no role in that particular issue or authority over the newspaper, such that it was only to undermine their candidate. Following a voting incident in which at several polls, Hmar's serial number was wrongly displayed (5 instead of 4), the two parties filed complaints to the CEO accusing the RO of incompetence and well as leaking the order to show cause of Hmar on social media before it was approved.

== See also ==
- Chuauthuama, columnist of Vanglaini from 2013-2024
- List of newspapers in India
