= Sangthankima =

Indian social worker

Sângthankima
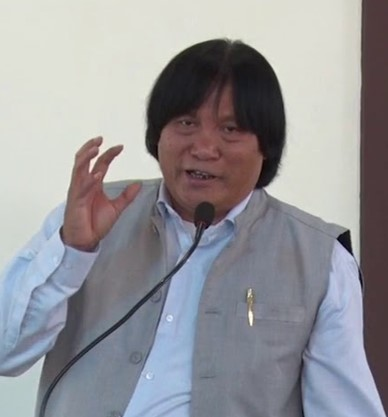
- Born: 18 October 1960 (age 66); Tlangsam, Mizoram, India
- Occupation: Social worker
- Known for: Thutak Nunpuitu Team
- Spouse: Lalṭhakimi (d.2019)
- Children: Chawngnunmawii, Lalsangzuala, Zomuanpuia, Lalchhantluanga
- Awards: Padma Shri (2024); Mother Teresa Awards (2014); Mizo Award (2014)

Sângthankima (born 18 October 1960) is a humanitarian and social worker in Mizoram, India. He is the founder of Thutak Nunpuitu Team (TNT), a voluntary organisation, which runs the largest charitable institution (by the same name) in Mizoram. His institution, a registered society since 1991 under the Firms and Societies in India, started as a rehabilitation society for alcoholics in Champhai town. With donation of a plot of land in Aizawl city, it expanded into an orphanage with formal school, health centre, and sanatorium. He received the Padma Shri Award in 2024.

== Biography ==
Sângthankima was born in Tlangsam village, near Champhai, in eastern Mizoram. He is the third eldest of nine children, two sisters and seven brothers. His father Lalruma Sailo (1933–2012) was a Church Elder in Champhai. He is named after his grandfather Lalsanga, Chief of North Khawbung. He completed primary school, but dropped out at entry of middle school at class five. He was into hard life in his youth, but became a born-again Christian in 1980, at age 20. He soon dedicated his evangelism for alcoholics. On 14 November 1988 he established a voluntary gospel organisation called Thutak Nunpuitu Team ("Practical Exemplar of Truth") at Champhai. The mission also took up social works such as caring for the disabled and orphans. In 1991, K. Thangzuala, a philanthropist donated a large plot of land for his organisation at Zuangtui, adjacent to Aizawl, capital city of Mizoram. He and his volunteers moved there and got formal registration as non-profit organisation under the Indian Firms and Societies Act.

== Thutak Nunpuitu Team ==
The organisation became synonymous with the institution, but which they officially called "Calvary Hospital". The first official building was inaugurated on 17 June 1994. The residence quickly expanded into an orphanage in 1995, offering formal education. It subsequently became rehabilitation for drug abusers and alcoholics, health centre for physically and mentally challenged people. Boarders include in addition to Mizo people, Chakma, Reang, Assamese, and Burmese. At one time, Burmese immigrants consisted as many as 70% of the total boarders. Education now covers up to secondary level, and consists of school building, a computer training centre, a tailoring training centre, a candle making industry, a school of music and fine arts, weightlifting academy, and games and sports training centre. Government of Mizoram has established a pre-school (anganwadi) centre and health clinic. There are also poultry yard, a dairy farm and piggery. According to record more than 260 mental patients, 850 drug abusers and 1500 alcoholics have recovered. As of 2014, there are 424 orphans, 254 mentally challenged and 324 drug addicts and alcoholics, with 68 volunteers. Sângthankima had no income when he started Thutak Nunpuitu Team or later Calvary Hospital. But he takes pride in that never had once been a skip of meal in his organisation. He receives support and aids from philanthropists and other organisations.

The organisation still continues at Champhai with 63 boarders, and in addition, has established rehabilitation centres at Lunglei with 95 boarders, and at Kolasib with 40 boarders.

== Achievements and recognitions ==
- Padma Shri for Social Work (2024).
- In 2008 he became the first honorary doctorate (D.H.L.) from Rangoon's Methodist Bible College. He was awarded by Writers' Club, Lunglei (WCL) on 24 July 2014.
- He received the Mother Teresa Awards for Social Justice from the Harmony Foundation on 9 November 2014.
- On 29 November 2014, former Chief Minister of Mizoram Brig. T. Sailo presented him the Mizo Award, the most-prized award in Mizoram instituted by Vanglaini publication.

== Personal life ==
Sângthankima is married to Lalṭhakimi (d.2019) With their four children, they live at Zuangtui.
