= Chhiahtlang =

- village
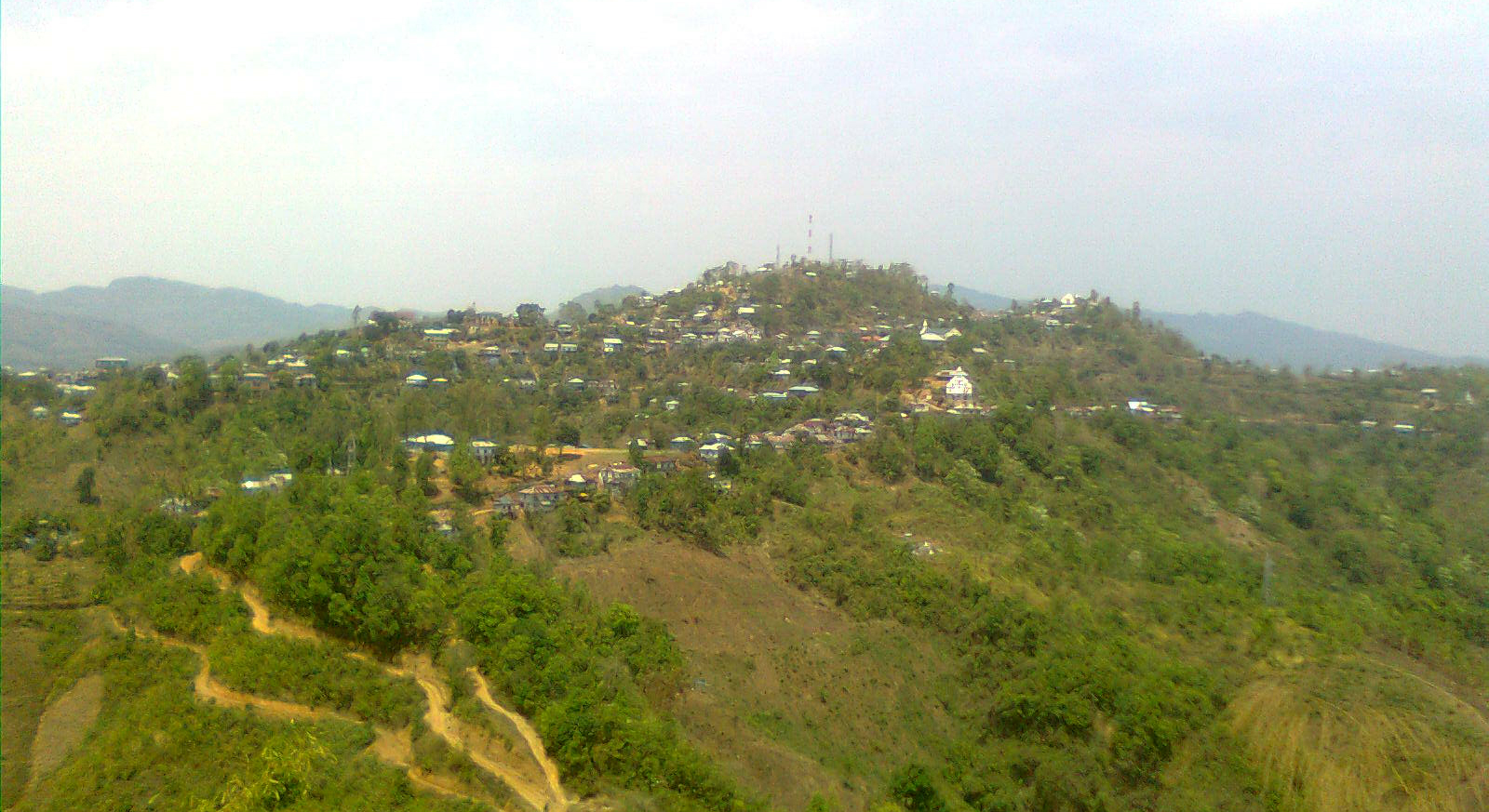
- View of Chhiahtlang village from High School Hill.

- Location in Mizoram, India Chhiahtlang (India)
- Coordinates: 23.379170°N 92.843592°E
- Country: India
- State: Mizoram
- District: Serchhip

Government
  - Body: Village Council

Population
  - Total: 4,000

Languages
  - Official: Mizo
- Time zone: UTC+5:30 (IST)
- PIN: 796181
- Telephone code: 03838
- Vehicle registration: MZ 06
- Coastline: 0 kilometres (0 mi)
- Nearest city: Aizawl
- TUIKUM constituency: Mizoram
- Civic agency: Village Council
- Website: mizoram.nic.in

′

Chhiahtlang is an independent village level administration within Serchhip Town, in the Mizoram State of India.
