= Aizawl North 3 Assembly constituency =

Constituency of the Mizoram legislative assembly in India

Coordinates: 23.754°N 92.718°E

Aizawl North 3
- Constituency No. 13 for the Mizoram Legislative Assembly
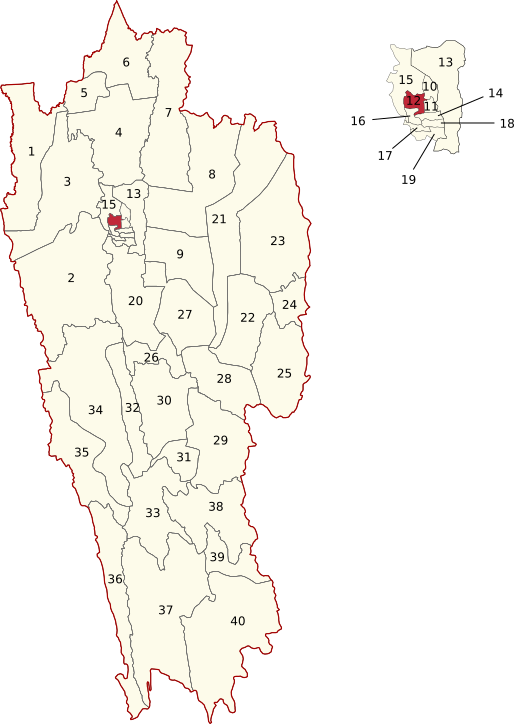

Constituency details
- Country: India
- Region: Northeast India
- State: Mizoram
- District: Aizawl
- Lok Sabha constituency: Mizoram
- Established: 2008
- Total electors: 17,181
- Reservation: ST

Member of Legislative Assembly
- 9th Mizoram Legislative Assembly
- Incumbent K. Sapdanga
- Party: Zoram People's Movement
- Elected year: 2023

Aizawl North 3 is one of the 40 assembly constituencies of Mizoram Legislative Assembly, in the northeastern Mizoram state of India. It is a reserved seat for the Scheduled tribes (ST).

== Members of the Legislative Assembly ==
Year	Member	Party
2008	Lal Thanzara	Indian National Congress
2013	Lal Thanzara	Indian National Congress
2018	C. Lalmuanpuia	Mizo National Front
2023	K. Sapdanga	Zoram People's Movement

== Election results ==
=== 2023 ===
2023 Mizoram Legislative Assembly election: Aizawl North 3
Party	Candidate	Votes	%	±%
MNF	C. Lalmuanpuia			
INC	Lal Thanzara			
ZPM	K. Sapdanga			
BJP	Chawnghmingthanga			
AAP	Andrew Lalremkima			
NOTA	None of the Above			
Majority				
Turnout				
		Swing		

=== 2018 ===
2018 Mizoram Legislative Assembly election: Aizawl North 3
Party	Candidate	Votes	%	±%
MNF	C. Lalmuanpuia	5,166	35.21	▼4.82
INC	Lal Thanzara	4732	32.25	▼13.23
ZPM	Lalhmingthanga	4510	30.74	▲17.10
Independent	Lalremsiama Ralte	139	0.95	New
BJP	VL Awia	77	0.52	▲0.26
NOTA	None of the Above	49	0.33	▼0.27
Majority		434	2.97	
Turnout		14673	77.38	▼2.38
MNF gain from INC		Swing		

=== 2013 ===
2013 Mizoram Legislative Assembly election: Aizawl North 3
Party	Candidate	Votes	%	±%
INC	Lal Thanzara	6,262	45.48	▲9.28
MNF	Lalchhandama Ralte	5512	40.03	▲9.44
ZNP	R. K. Daniela	1878	13.64	New
BJP	Biakmawia	36	0.26	New
NOTA	None of the Above	82	0.60	New
Majority		750	5.48	
Turnout		13770	79.76	▲2.76
INC hold		Swing		

=== 2008 ===
2008 Mizoram Legislative Assembly election: Aizawl North 3
Party	Candidate	Votes	%	±%
INC	Lal Thanzara	4,109	36.20	
MNF	K. Sangthuama	3603	31.74	
MPC	Rosiamngheta	3472	30.59	
Independent	C. Laltanpuia	120	1.06	
LJP	P. C. Lalsangliana	47	0.41	
Majority		506	4.46	
Turnout		11351	77.0	
INC win (new seat)				

== See also ==
- Aizawl
