= R. Rohmingliana =

Indian politician

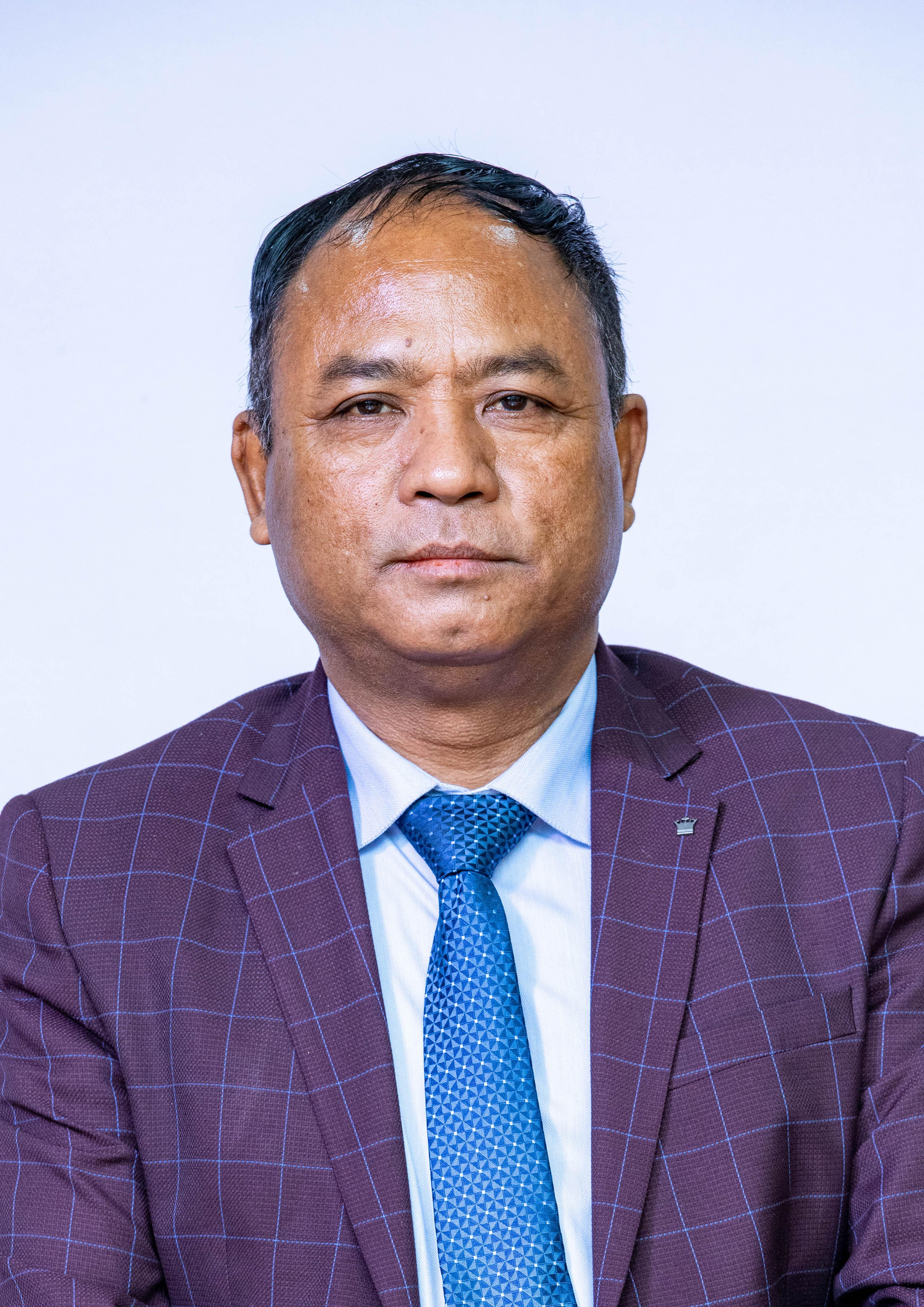
- R. Rohmingliana in 2023

Member of Mizoram Legislative Assembly
- Incumbent
- Assumed office 2023
- Preceded by: Zodintluanga
- Constituency: Thorang

Personal details
- Born: 10 October 1972 (age 53) Bungtlang, Union Territory of Mizoram, India (now Mizoram State), Assam
- Party: Mizo National Front
- Spouse: T. Linda Lachhingpuii
- Parent: R. Lalruala (father)

R. Rohmingliana (born 1972) is an Indian politician from Mizoram. He won the 2023 Mizoram Legislative Assembly election on the MNF ticket from the Thorang constituency which is reserved for Scheduled Tribe community in Lunglei district. He defeated the sitting MLA Zodintluanga Ralte of the Indian National Congress by a margin of 62 votes.

== Early life and education ==
Rohmingliana hails from Thorang and is a post-graduate. His father's name is R. Lalruala. He is a businessman and his wife is an assistant professor at RIPANS, Aizwal.

== Career ==
He lost the 2018 Assembly election to Zodintluanga Ralte of the INC but defeated him by a narrow margin in 2023.
