= Joy Pachuau =

Indian author and professor (born 1969)

- Born: 13 April 1969 (age 56); Aizawl, Mizoram, India
- Occupation: Professor
- Known for: Author of Being Mizo
- Awards: Mizo Award (2017)

Joy L. Pachuau is an author and professor from Mizoram who resides at Delhi. She is a professor at Centre for Historical Studies, Jawaharlal Nehru University. Her research interest includes the social history of Mizoram and Christianity in India; she has also worked on the Portuguese presence on the west coast of India in the 16th and 17th centuries.

== Education ==
Pachuau obtained her bachelor's degree from Fergusson College, Pune, in 1989 and her MA, Phil and Ph.D. degree from Jawaharlal Nehru University and D.Phil. degree from Oxford University in 2012.

== Awards and honor ==
Pachuau was awarded with the Mizo Award given to her by Sângthankima which was organised by the Vanglaini daily newspaper in Mizoram for her achievements in academic. She has also been awarded Sneh Mahajan Prize for the Best Book (2012–14) in Modern Indian History by Indian History Congress.

== Bibliography ==
- Being Mizo. Identity and Belonging in Northeast India (OUP 2014) co-authored with Willem van Schendel
- The Camera as Witness. A social history of Mizoram, Northeast India (CUP 2014).
- Christianity in Indian History, Issues of Culture, Power and Knowledge, New Delhi.
