= The Mizoram Post =

English-language newspaper in Mizoram, India

- Type: Daily newspaper
- Format: Broadsheet
- Language: English
- Country: India
- Circulation: 59,500 (2008)
- Website: themizorampost.net

The Mizoram Post is an English-language daily newspaper in Mizoram, India. It is the only INS (The Indian Newspaper Society) accredited newspaper published from Aizawl, Mizoram, India. In 2007, the Government of India's Directorate of Advertising and Visual Publicity (DAVP) accredited it as the most circulated newspaper in Mizoram. It had circulation of around 59,500 in 2008. Along with Newslink and Highlander, it is one of the three prominent dailies in Mizoram.
