= Thorang Assembly constituency =

Constituency of the Mizoram legislative assembly in India

Coordinates: 23.240°N 92.406°E

Thorang
- Constituency No. 34 for the Mizoram Legislative Assembly
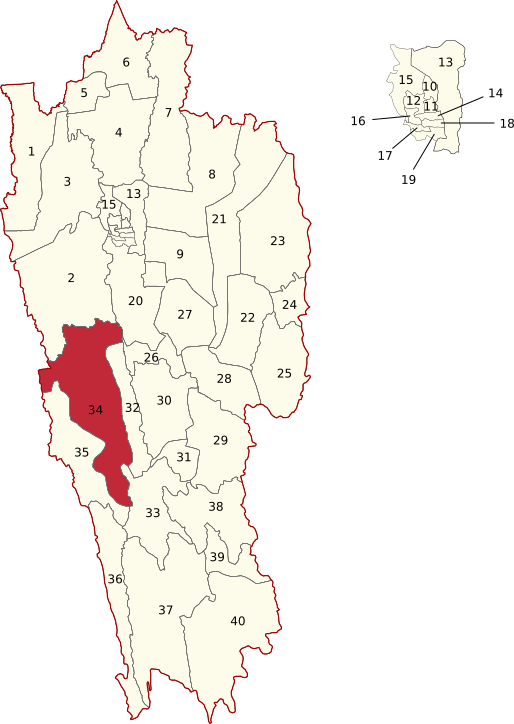

Constituency details
- Country: India
- Region: Northeast India
- State: Mizoram
- District: Lunglei
- Lok Sabha constituency: Mizoram
- Established: 2008
- Total electors: 14,955
- Reservation: ST

Member of Legislative Assembly
- 9th Mizoram Legislative Assembly
- Incumbent R. Rohmingliana
- Party: Mizo National Front
- Elected year: 2023

Thorang is one of the 40 Legislative Assembly constituencies of Mizoram state in India.

It is part of Lunglei district and is reserved for candidates belonging to the Scheduled Tribes. As of 2023, it is represented by R. Rohmingliana of the Mizo National Front party.

== Members of the Legislative Assembly ==
Year	Name	Party
2008	Zodintluanga Ralte	Indian National Congress
2013	Zodintluanga Ralte	Indian National Congress
2018	Zodintluanga Ralte	Indian National Congress
2023	R. Rohmingliana	Mizo National Front

== Election results ==
=== 2023 ===
2023 Mizoram Legislative Assembly election: Thorang
Party	Candidate	Votes	%	±%
MNF	R. Rohmingliana	4,141	31.24	
INC	Zodintluanga Ralte	4,079	30.77	
ZPM	C. Lalnunnema	3,146	23.73	
BJP	Shanti Bikash Chakma	1,772	13.37	
NOTA	None of the Above	119	0.90	
Majority		62	0.47	
Turnout		13,257		
MNF gain from INC		Swing		

=== 2018 ===
2018 Mizoram Legislative Assembly election: Thorang
Party	Candidate	Votes	%	±%
INC	Zodintluanga Ralte			
NOTA	None of the Above			
Majority				
Turnout				
		Swing		
