= R. Lalzirliana =

Indian politician

Member of the Mizoram Legislative Assembly for Tawi
- Succeeded by: Prof. Lalnilawma

Personal details
- Born: 3 August 1949 (age 76)
- Party: Mizo National Front
- Children: 4

R. Lalzirliana is a Mizo National Front politician from Mizoram. He was the minister for power and electricity, art and culture, land resources, soil and water conservation and district council affairs departments of Mizoram.

== Career ==
He was involved in the Young Mizo Association from 1983 to 1985 before he entered politics. He started contesting MLA elections for the Congress party in 1998, 2003, 2008 and 2013, and also served as Vice President of the Mizoram Pradesh Congress Committee. He was Home Minister under the Congress Government under Lalthanhawla from 2008, until he switched sides and switched to the Mizo National Front government led by Zoramthanga in 2018. He contested the 2018 elections under the MNF ticket in the Tawi constituency. He lost to Vanlalhlana of the Zoram People's Movement in the 2023 Assembly Election in the Aizawl North-I assembly constituency.

== Personal life ==
He married T. Lalthangmawii, and they have two sons and two daughters.
