= New Serchhip =

- Town
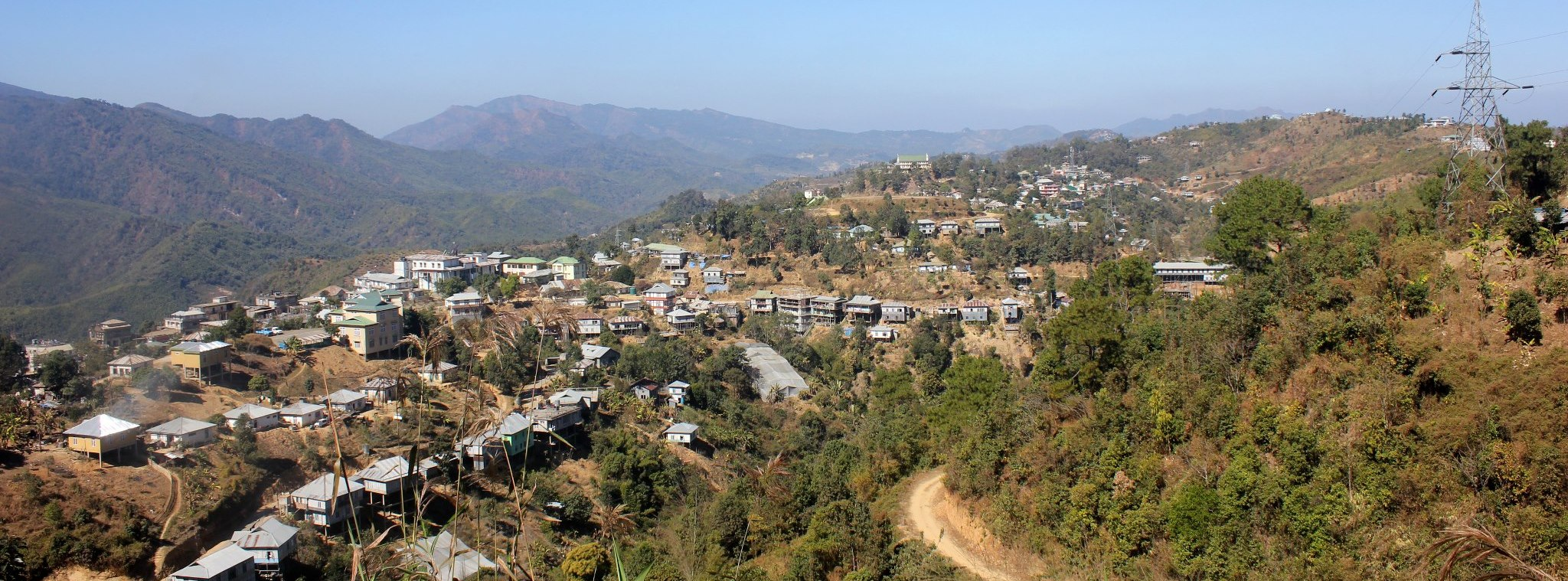
- A skyline of New Serchhip

- Location in Mizoram, India New Serchhip (India)
- Coordinates: 23.332872°N 92.854572°E
- Country: India
- State: Mizoram
- District: Serchhip
- Settled: 1976

Government
  - Body: Village Council
- Elevation: 944 m (3,097 ft)

Population (2001)
  - Total: 2,500

Languages
  - Official: Mizo

Ethnicity
  - Ethnic groups: Mizo
  - Year of data: 2011
- Time zone: UTC+5:30 (IST)
- PIN: 796181
- Telephone code: 913838
- Vehicle registration: MZ-06
- Nearest city: Aizawl
- Literacy: 100%
- Civic agency: Village Councils
- Avg. summer temperature: 34 °C (93 °F)
- Avg. winter temperature: 9 °C (48 °F)
- Website: mizoram.nic.in

New Serchhip is the northern extension of Serchhip Town in Mizoram State of India. It was created and inhabited since 1976.

== Administration ==
New Serchhip is administratively divided into two separate Village Councils: New Serchhip North and New Serchhip South. This division is reflected in official records, with both councils operating as distinct civic bodies within Serchhip District.

For disaster management purposes, both New Serchhip North and South fall under Zone-I within Serchhip District, which also covers the P&E and Chanmari areas. The Zonal Officer for Zone-I is the SDO (Sadar), Serchhip.

== Assembly Constituency ==
New Serchhip falls under the 26-Serchhip (ST) Assembly Constituency in Serchhip District, Mizoram. Official election documents confirm this, listing polling stations such as 26/23 – New Serchhip I and 26/25 – New Serchhip III under this constituency . A 2016 notification from the Election Commission of India also references polling station 26/20 – New Serchhip-II within the same constituency .

The sitting MLA for the 26-Serchhip constituency is Lalduhoma of the Zoram People's Movement (ZPM), who won the 2023 Mizoram Assembly election.

== Village Councils ==
=== 2025 General Election to Village Councils ===
The most recent General Election to Village Councils was held on 12 February 2025 across Mizoram. In Serchhip District, the Zoram People's Movement (ZPM) won a majority in 266 Village Councils statewide, including sweeping victories in the New Serchhip councils.

==== New Serchhip North (VC03029) ====
The council has 7 seats. All seats were won by the Zoram People's Movement (ZPM).

#	Elected Candidate	Party
1	RL Chhuanawma	ZPM
2	H. Lalengzauva	ZPM
3	C. Biakchhawna	ZPM
4	H. Lalremsiama	ZPM
5	R. Lallianvunga	ZPM
6	Zarzoliani (Reserved)	ZPM
7	Zairemtluangi (Reserved)	ZPM

==== New Serchhip South (VC03030) ====
The council has 7 seats, with a mix of ZPM, MNF, and INC members elected.

#	Elected Candidate	Party
1	R Sanghmingthanga	ZPM
2	Lalthuamliana	MNF
3	R Lalhmingthanga	ZPM
4	Laltlankima	MNF
5	K Vanlalruata	INC
6	Vanhlupui (Reserved)	INC
7	Zomuansangi (Reserved)	ZPM

== Education ==
Government Serchhip College is located in New Serchhip, Mizoram - 796181 . The college is a government-run undergraduate institution affiliated with Mizoram University . Established in 1973 as a joint venture of Serchhip and Chhiahtlang villages, it relocated to its present campus in New Serchhip in July 1976 . The college offers Bachelor of Arts, Bachelor of Science, and Bachelor of Computer Application programmes across 13 departments . Its campus spans 52 acres in New Serchhip . The college holds an A grade accreditation from NAAC .

== History ==
New Serchhip was inhabited since 1974 and had recently celebrated their golden jubilee on 12 December 2024.

== Transport ==
Town bus, taxi and auto-rickshaw are the major means of public transport. Daily maxicab services to Aizawl, Lunglei and Champhai are available. There is one Helipad in New Serchhip which connected Aizawl by Pawan Hans Helicopter service.
