= Lalnilawma =

Indian politician

Prof. Lalnilawma
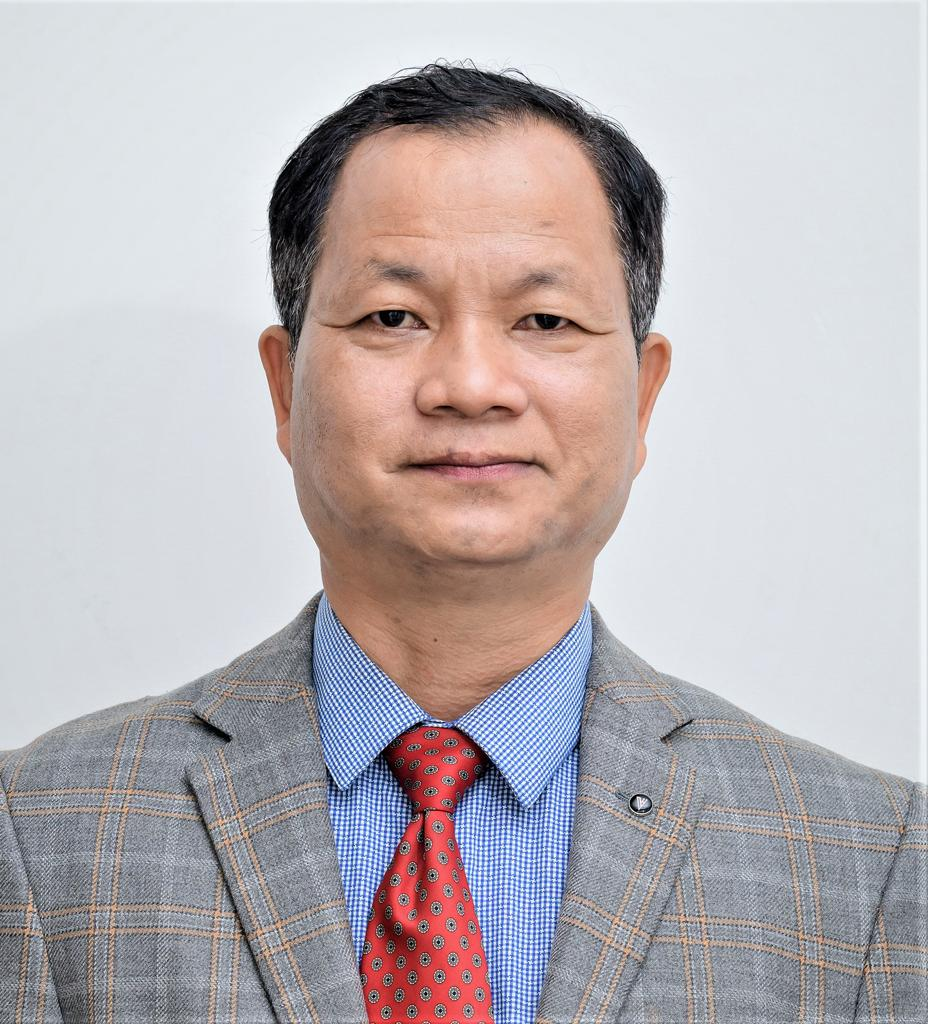

Member of the Mizoram Legislative Assembly for Tawi
- Incumbent
- Assumed office December 2023
- Preceded by: R Lalzirliana

Personal details
- Born: 15 November 1968 (age 57)
- Party: Zoram People's Movement (since 2017)
- Children: 3
- Parent: Thankhuma (father)
- Education: PhD Rural Development
- Alma mater: Central Luzon State University

Professor Lalnilawma is an academic and politician from Mizoram, India. He is currently the Minister of State for Rural Development, Horticulture and Public Health Engineering. He is also professor of Rural Development at Mizoram University. He was elected to the Mizoram Legislative Assembly from the Tawi constituency in the 2023 general election as a Zoram People's Movement candidate.

== Education ==
Lalnilawma earned his Doctor of Philosophy in 1998 from Central Central Luzon State University in the Philippines. Prior to this, he completed his master's degree in Science and bachelor's degree in arts, both at Central Luzon State University and Spicer Adventist University respectively.
