= Zalen =

Indian newspaper

- Format: Broadsheet
- Owner(s): Valalrema Vantawl
- Founded: 2004
- Language: Mizo
- Headquarters: Aizawl, India
- Circulation: 30,000
- Website: zalen.in

Zalen is the largest Sunday newspaper in Mizoram, northeast India, published in the Mizo language. It is owned, edited, and published by Vanlalrema Vantawl. Zalen means freedom in "Mizoram". Zalen website news content is updated real time daily along with phone application.

== Mizo of the Decade ==
Zalen had a function where they selected Mizo of the Decade, Mr R.Ramhmangaiha, founder of Hnam Chhantu.

== Edu Fest ==
Zalen in collaboration with lynchpin India conducts an annual education fair in Aizawl, Mizoram called Edu Options.

== See also ==
- List of newspapers in India
