= Tawi Assembly constituency =

Constituency of the Mizoram legislative assembly in India

Coordinates: 23.970°N 92.575°E

Tawi
- Constituency No. 9 for the Mizoram Legislative Assembly
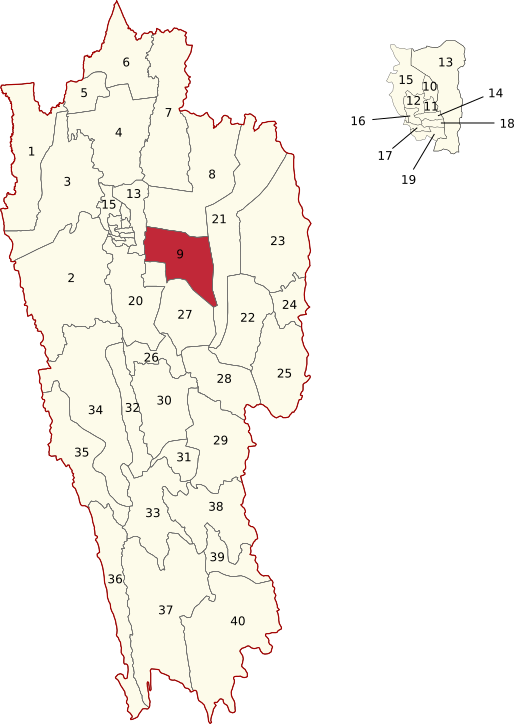

Constituency details
- Country: India
- Region: Northeast India
- State: Mizoram
- District: Aizawl
- Lok Sabha constituency: Mizoram
- Established: 2008
- Total electors: 20,216
- Reservation: ST

Member of Legislative Assembly
- 9th Mizoram Legislative Assembly
- Incumbent Prof. Lalnilawma
- Party: Zoram People's Movement
- Elected year: 2023

Tawi is one of the 40 Legislative Assembly constituencies of Mizoram state in India.

It is part of Aizawl district and is reserved for candidates belonging to the Scheduled Tribes.

== Members of the Legislative Assembly ==
Year	Member	Party
2008	R. Lalzirliana	INC
2013	R. Lalzirliana	INC
2018	R. Lalzirliana	MNF
2023	Prof. Lalnilawma	ZPM

== Election results ==
=== 2023 ===
2023 Mizoram Legislative Assembly election: Tawi
Party	Candidate	Votes	%	±%
MNF	Lairinenga Sailo			
ZPM	Prof. Lalnilawma			
INC	Lalringliana Khiangte			
NOTA	None of the Above			
Majority				
Turnout				
		Swing		

=== 2018 ===
2018 Mizoram Legislative Assembly election: Tawi
Party	Candidate	Votes	%	±%
MNF	R. Lalzirliana	4,940	37.35	▼0.60
ZPM	R. Lalthatluanga	4756	35.96	▲20.00
INC	Lalhmachhuana	2630	19.89	▼25.53
BJP	J. V. Hluna	714	5.40	New
PRISM	H. Lalremsiama	97	0.73	New
Independent	Lalzenghaki	49	0.37	New
NOTA	None of the Above	39	0.29	▼0.28
Majority		184	1.40	
Turnout		13225	84.47	▲0.89
MNF gain from INC		Swing		

=== 2013 ===
2013 Mizoram Legislative Assembly election: Tawi
Party	Candidate	Votes	%	±%
INC	R. Lalzirliana	5,757	45.42	▲4.13
MNF	Lalmalsawmi	4810	37.95	▲7.28
ZNP	R. Lalthatluanga	2023	15.96	New
NOTA	None of the Above	84	0.66	New
Majority		947	7.52	
Turnout		12674	87.01	▲0.51
INC hold		Swing		

=== 2008 ===
2008 Mizoram Legislative Assembly election: Tawi
Party	Candidate	Votes	%	±%
INC	R. Lalzirliana	4,710	41.29	
MNF	Lalchhandama Ralte	3499	30.67	
MPC	Kenneth Chawngliana	3127	27.41	
LJP	Biakngheta	71	0.62	
Majority		1211	10.62	
Turnout		11407	86.5	
INC win (new seat)				
