= Lalsawta =

Indian politician

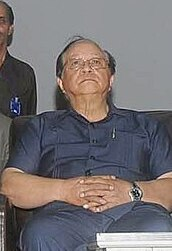
- Lalsawta in 2023

President of Mizoram Pradesh Congress Committee
- In office 5 December 2021 – 21 February 2024
- Preceded by: Lal Thanhawla
- Succeeded by: Lal Thanzara

Minister for Finance Mizoram
- In office 25 November 2013 – 28 November 2018
- Chief Minister: Lal Thanhawla

Member of the Mizoram Legislative Assembly
- In office 1 February 2008 – 28 November 2018
- Preceded by: H. Vanlalauva
- Succeeded by: Robert Romawia Royte
- Constituency: Aizawl East 2

Personal details
- Born: 21 March 1946 (age 80) Aizawl, Assam Province, British India
- Party: Indian National Congress

Pu Lalsawta (born 21 March 1946) is an Indian politician from Mizoram of the Indian National Congress and former President of the Mizoram Pradesh Congress Committee when he succeeded former Chief Minister Lal Thanhawla, who retired after leading the Congress for four decades.

Lalsawta also previously served as an MLA for the Aizawl East 2 Assembly constituency for three terms, from 2008 till 2018 Mizoram Legislative Assembly election, and also as Mizoram's Finance Minister under Chief Minister Lal Thanhawla from 2013 till 2018.

== Career ==
Lalsawta served as Mizoram Pradesh Congress Committee vice president before becoming President. He has successfully contested the Mizoram Legislative Assembly elections in 1993, 2008 and 2013.
