= Lal Thanzara =

Indian politician

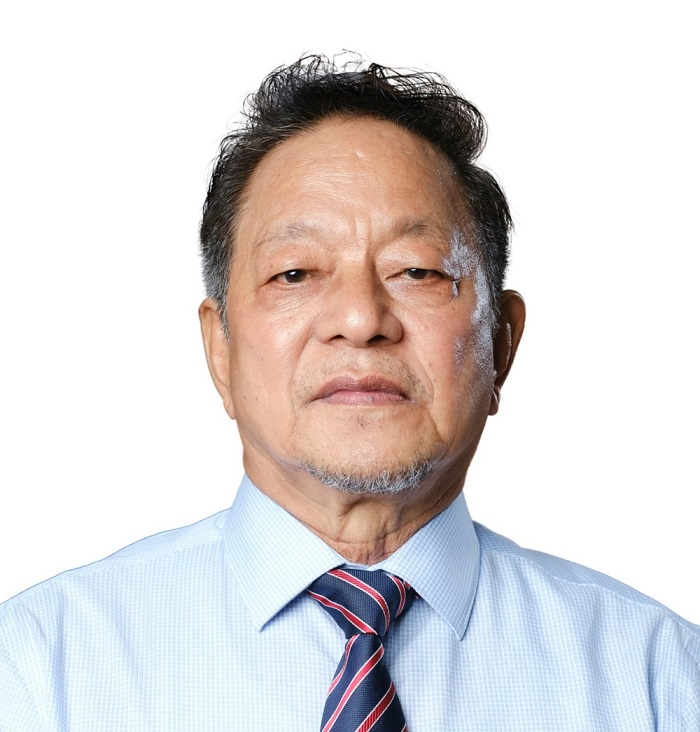

President Mizoram Pradesh Congress Committee
- Incumbent
- Assumed office 21 February 2024
- Preceded by: Lalsawta

Member of Mizoram Legislative Assembly
- In office 2008–2018
- Preceded by: Constituency Established
- Succeeded by: C. Lalmuanpuia
- Constituency: Aizawl North 3

Personal details
- Party: Indian National Congress
- Relations: brother of the former Chief Minister of Mizoram Lal Thanhawla

Lal Thanzara is an Indian politician from Mizoram. He is currently serving as President of the Mizoram Pradesh Congress Committee. He was a member of the Mizoram Legislative Assembly for Aizawl North 3. He is a former President of the Mizoram Football Association.

He won Aizawl North 3 by winning 6,175 of the 10,916 votes polled. He is the brother of the former Chief Minister of Mizoram Lal Thanhawla. Touted by many as a Chief Minister in waiting, he was the Cabinet Minister for Health & Family Welfare, Information & Communication Technology, Information & Public Relations and assisted his brother, the Chief Minister in Public Works Department and Power and Electricity Department, in the Government of Mizoram till 2018 when the General Assembly Elections were held and he lost his seat in Aizawl North 3 to C. Lalmuanpuia from the Mizo National Front.

He was elected as the President of Mizoram Pradesh Congress Committee on 21 February 2024.
