= Zodintluanga Ralte =

Indian politician

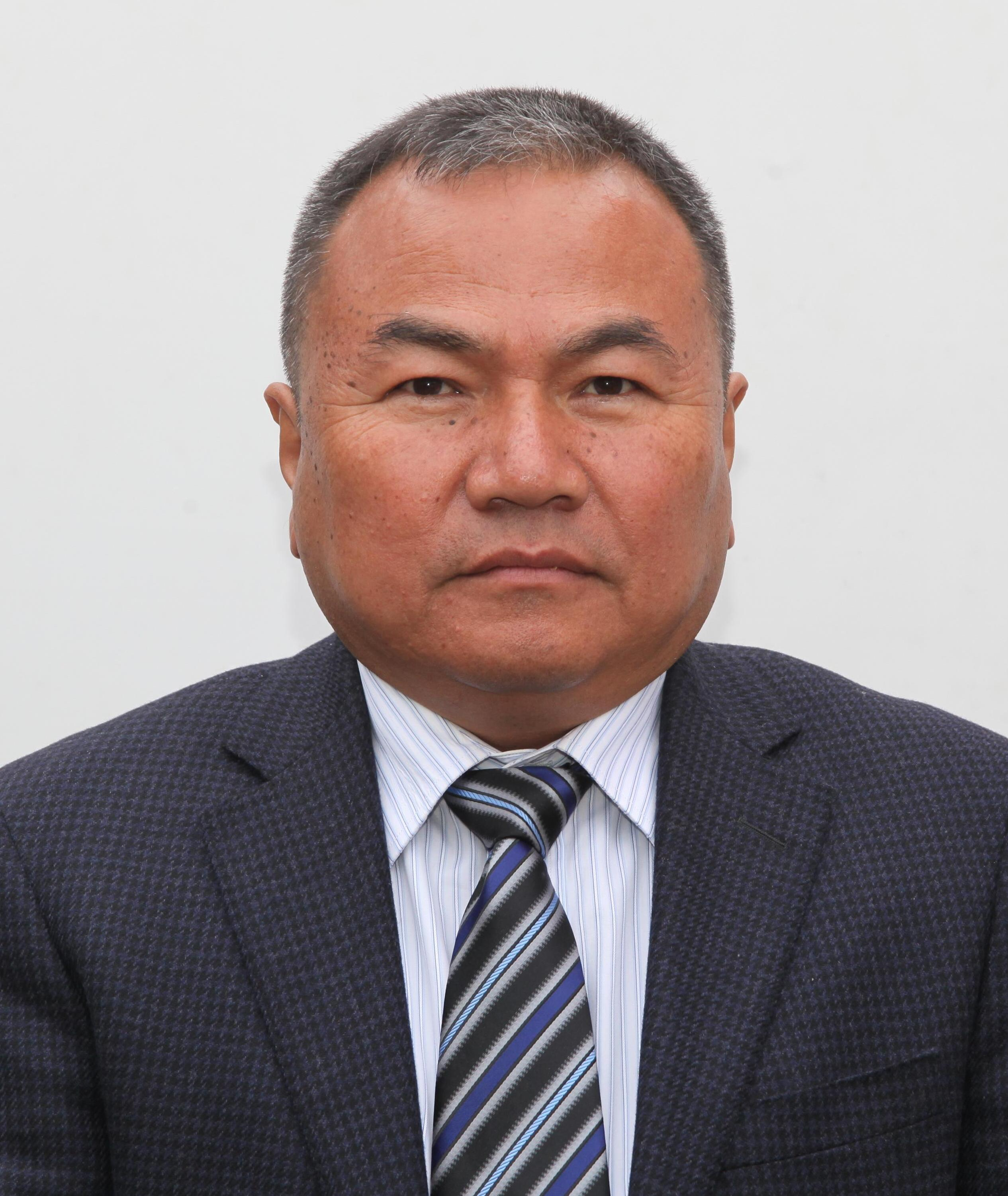

Member of Mizoram Legislative Assembly
- In office 2008–2023
- Constituency: Thorang

Personal details
- Born: 31 July 1962 (age 63) Lunglei, Mizo District (now Mizoram State), Assam, India
- Party: Indian National Congress
- Spouse: Lalrengpuii
- Parent: Rothangpuia (father)

Zodintluanga Ralte is an Indian politician from Mizoram who resides in Tuikual, Aizawl. He was the Treasurer of the Mizoram Pradesh Congress Committee. He previously served as the Leader of the Congress Legislature party in the Mizoram Legislative Assembly.

== Career ==
He has served in various capacities in Mizoram Pradesh Congress Committee as Executive Member, General Secretary and President of the youth wing before taking over as treasurer of the MPCC. He was the MLA of Thorang from 2008 to 2023. He has been well known for introducing astroturf in Lammual and Rajiv Gandhi Stadium, Aizawl and various parts of the state including Lunglei, Kolasib and Champhai.
