= Aizawl Municipal Corporation =

Local civic body in Aizawl, Mizoram, India

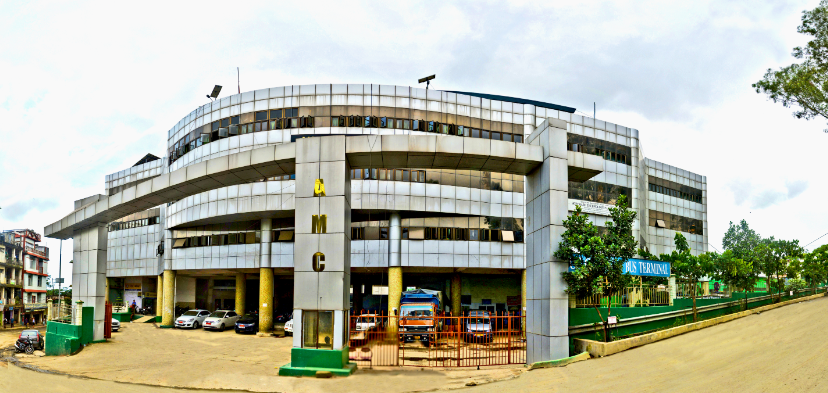

Type
- Type: Municipal Corporation
- Term limits: 5 years

Leadership
- Mayor: H Lalremtluanga, ZPM
- Deputy Mayor: R. Lalawmpuii, ZPM

Structure
- Seats: 19
- Political groups: Government (17): ZPM (17); Opposition (2): MNF (1); INC (1)

Elections
- Last election: 2026
- Next election: 2031

Website
- https://amcmizoram.com/

Aizawl Municipal Corporation is a municipal body that governs the Aizawl, the capital city of the Indian state of Mizoram.

== History ==
In 2010, the Aizawl Municipal council was upgraded to Aizawl Municipal Corporation under the Mizoram Municipalities Act, 2007.

== Composition ==
The corporation consists of 19 seats, of which 6 seats- Ward -III, VIII, X, XIV, XVI and XIX are reserved for women.

== Elections ==
=== 2026 Aizawl Municipal Corporation election ===
In the 2026 election, the ZPM had won majority with 17 seats. MNF and INC won 1 seat each.

=== 2021 Aizawl Municipal Corporation election ===
In the 2021 election, the MNF had won majority with 11 seats. ZPM came second with 6 seats and INC won 2 seats.

=== 2015 Aizawl Municipal Corporation election ===
In the 2015 election, the MNF had won majority with 11 seats. INC came second with 7 seats and MPC won 1 seat.
