= Mizoram Pradesh Congress Committee =

Indian political party

- President: Lal Thanzara
- Chairman: Zodintluanga Ralte
- Headquarters: Aizawl, Mizoram
- Youth wing: Mizoram Youth Congress
- Women's wing: Mizoram Pradesh Mahila Congress Committee
- Ideology: Populism; Social liberalism; Democratic socialism; Social democracy; Secularism
- ECI Status: A State Unit of Indian National Congress
- Alliance: Indian National Developmental Inclusive Alliance
- Seats in Rajya Sabha: 0 / 1
- Seats in Lok Sabha: 0 / 1
- Seats in Mizoram Legislative Assembly: 1 / 40

Website
- https://incmizoram.in/

Mizoram Pradesh Congress Committee (or MPCC) is a state unit of Indian National Congress serving in Mizoram. It is responsible for organizing and coordinating the party's activities and campaigns within the state, as well as selecting candidates for local, state, and national elections in Mizoram. The current president of the Mizoram PCC is Lal Thanzara . The committee has been a major political force in Mizoram since the formation of the state in 1987, having won several state elections and held power for long periods of time.

== Mizoram Legislative Assembly election ==
| Year | Party leader | Seats won | Change in seats | Outcome |
|---|---|---|---|---|
| 1972 | Laisanguala | 6 / 30 | ▲ New | Opposition |
| 1978 | - | 0 / 30 | ▼6 | Opposition |
| 1979 | C. L. Ruala | 5 / 30 | ▲5 | Opposition |
| 1984 | Pu Lalthanhawla | 20 / 30 | ▲15 | Government |
| 1987 | Pu Lalthanhawla | 13 / 40 | ▼7 | Opposition |
| 1989 | Pu Lalthanhawla | 23 / 40 | ▲10 | Government |
| 1993 | Pu Lalthanhawla | 16 / 40 | ▼7 | Government |
| 1998 | Pu Lalthanhawla | 6 / 40 | ▼10 | Opposition |
| 2003 | Pu Lalthanhawla | 12 / 40 | ▲6 | Opposition |
| 2008 | Pu Lalthanhawla | 32 / 40 | ▲20 | Government |
| 2013 | Pu Lalthanhawla | 34 / 40 | ▲2 | Government |
| 2018 | Pu Lalthanhawla | 5 / 40 | ▼24 | Opposition |
| 2023 | Lalsawta | 1 / 40 | ▼4 | Opposition |

Mizoram Congress Legislative Assembly seat count

== Performance in Lok Sabha ==
Lok Sabha Elections
| Year | Lok Sabha | Party Leader | Seats contested | Seats won | (+/−) in seats | % of votes | Vote swing | Popular vote | Outcome |
|---|---|---|---|---|---|---|---|---|---|
| 1972 | 5th | Indira Gandhi | 1 | 0 / 1 (0%) | New entry | 36.11% | New entry | 40,081 | Government |
| 1977 | 6th | Indira Gandhi | 1 | 0 / 1 (0%) | Steady | 37.07% | | 37,342 | Opposition |
| 1980 | 7th | Indira Gandhi | Did Not Contest | | | | | | Government |
| 1984 | 8th | Rajiv Gandhi | 1 | 1 / 1 (100%) | ▲1 | Won Unopposed | | | Government |
| 1989 | 9th | Rajiv Gandhi | 1 | 1 / 1 (100%) | Steady | 48.45% | | 1,09,571 | Opposition |
| 1991 | 10th | P. V. Narasimha Rao | 1 | 1 / 1 (100%) | Steady | 38.08% | | 91,612 | Government |
| 1996 | 11th | P. V. Narasimha Rao | 1 | 1 / 1 (100%) | Steady | 42.50% | | 1,26,191 | Opposition |
| 1998 | 12th | Sitaram Kesri | 1 | 0 / 1 (0%) | ▼1 | 34.86% | | 1,06,511 | Opposition |
| 1999 | 13th | Sonia Gandhi | Did Not Contest | | | | | | Opposition |
| 2004 | 14th | Sonia Gandhi | Did Not Contest | | | | | | Government |
| 2009 | 15th | Manmohan Singh | 1 | 1 / 1 (100%) | ▲1 | 65.58% | | 2,13,779 | Government |
| 2014 | 16th | Rahul Gandhi | 1 | 1 / 1 (100%) | Steady | 48.59% | | 2,10,485 | Opposition |
| 2019 | 17th | Rahul Gandhi | Did Not Contest | | | | | | Opposition |
| 2024 | 18th | Mallikarjun Kharge | 1 | 0 / 1 (0%) | ▼1 | 20.08% | | 97,761 | Opposition |

== List of presidents ==
| S.no | President | Term | |
|---|---|---|---|
| 1. | Lal Thanhawla | 12 June 1973 | 5 December 2021 |
| 2. | Lalsawta | 5 December 2021 | 21 February 2024 |
| 3. | Lal Thanzara | 21 February 2024 | Incumbent |

== Office Bearers ==
The Elected Office Bearers of Mizoram Pradesh Congress Committee are:

- President: Lal Thanzara
- Vice President: Lalnunmawia Chuaungo
- Treasurer: Dr Lalmalsawma Nghaka

== Structure and Composition ==
| S.No. | Name | Designation | Incharge |
|---|---|---|---|
| 01 | Lalsawta | President | Mizoram Pradesh Congress |
| 02 | Lal Thanzara | Sr. Vice President | Mizoram Pradesh Congress |
| 03 | Lalnunmawia Chuaungo | Vice President | Mizoram Pradesh Congress |
| 04 | Dr Lalmalsawma Nghaka | Treasurer | Mizoram Pradesh Congress |
| 05 | Meer Akhtar Hussain | Incharge | Rajiv Gandhi Panchayati Raj Sangathan, AICC |

== History ==
For about 300 years till 1952, the Mizo people were ruled by the autocratic and hereditary Chiefs. This system was upheld by the British Administration with supervision by the British officers. From the 1920s there had been pent up desire for a political change and for representative form of government. But any signs of Democratic movement were promptly suppressed by the British rulers. For the first time the administration allowed Political organisation in 1946, and the Mizo Union party was immediately formed. The Mizo Union movement soon won the support of the Mizo people. The policy of this party was to away with hereditary and autocratic rule and instead introduce a representative form of government. The aspirations of the people and those of the National Leaders of the INC were similar. The Mizo Union opposed some sporadic attempts of certain groups who advocated Mizoram Independence. Members of the Assam Legislature from the Mizo Union joined the Congress Parliamentary Party in the Assam Assembly. There was however, a rift between the Mizo Union and the Assam State Level Congress party from 1959 for various reasons. The Mizo Union finally merged with the Indian National Congress in 1974.

== See also ==
- Indian National Congress
- Congress Working Committee
- All India Congress Committee
- Pradesh Congress Committee
- Mizoram
