= North Khawbung =

North Khawbung N. Khawbung
- village
- Location in Mizoram, India North Khawbung (India)
- Coordinates: 23.5422123°N 93.3124535°E
- Country: India
- State: Mizoram
- District: Champhai
- Block: Champhai
- Elevation: 1,551 m (5,089 ft)

Population (2011)
  - Total: 875
- Time zone: UTC+5:30 (IST)
- 2011 census code: 271348

North Khawbung is a village located in Champhai district of Mizoram, India. It is located in the Champhai R.D. Block.

== Demographics ==
According to the 2011 census of India, North Khawbung has 178 households. The effective literacy rate (i.e. the literacy rate of population excluding children aged 6 and below) is 98.98%.

Demographics (2011 Census)
	Total	Male	Female
Population	875	439	436
Children aged below 6 years	190	107	83
Scheduled caste	0	0	0
Scheduled tribe	860	433	427
Literates	678	329	349
Workers (all)	307	228	79
Main workers (total)	280	215	65
Main workers: Cultivators	3	3	0
Main workers: Agricultural labourers	234	179	55
Main workers: Household industry workers	2	2	0
Main workers: Other	41	31	10
Marginal workers (total)	27	13	14
Marginal workers: Cultivators	1	1	0
Marginal workers: Agricultural labourers	23	11	12
Marginal workers: Household industry workers	1	0	1
Marginal workers: Others	2	1	1
Non-workers	568	211	357
