= Serchhip =

- Town
- View of DC Office from Entlang

- Location within Mizoram Location within India
- Coordinates: 23.308996°N 92.856701°E
- Country: India
- State: Mizoram
- Settled: 19th century CE
- Elevation: 888 m (2,913 ft)

Population (2011)
  - Total: 64,875
  - Density: 46/km^{2} (120/sq mi)

Languages
  - Official: Mizo

Ethnicity
  - Ethnic groups: Mizo
  - Year of data: 2011
- Time zone: UTC+5:30 (IST)
- PIN: 796181
- Telephone code: +913838
- ISO 3166 code: [[ISO 3166-2:IN|]]
- Vehicle registration: MZ-06
- Nearest city: Aizawl
- Sex ratio: 976 ♂/♀
- Literacy: 98.76%
- Lok Sabha constituency: Mizoram
- Vidhan Sabha constituency: Serchhip
- Planning agency: UD&PA
- Civic agency: Joint Village Councils
- Climate: Cwa
- Website: serchhip.nic.in

Serchhip is a town located in the Indian state of Mizoram, in the northeastern part of the country. It serves as the district capital of the Serchhip district.

== Geography ==
Serchhip is located at 23.3°N 92.83°E.

== Transport ==
Serchhip is connected by Pawan Hans Helicopter service from Aizawl.

== Education ==
The average literacy rate of Serchhip in 2011 was 98.76% compared to 95.18% in 2001. Male and Female literacy in 2011 were 99.24% and 98.28% respectively.

== Tourism ==
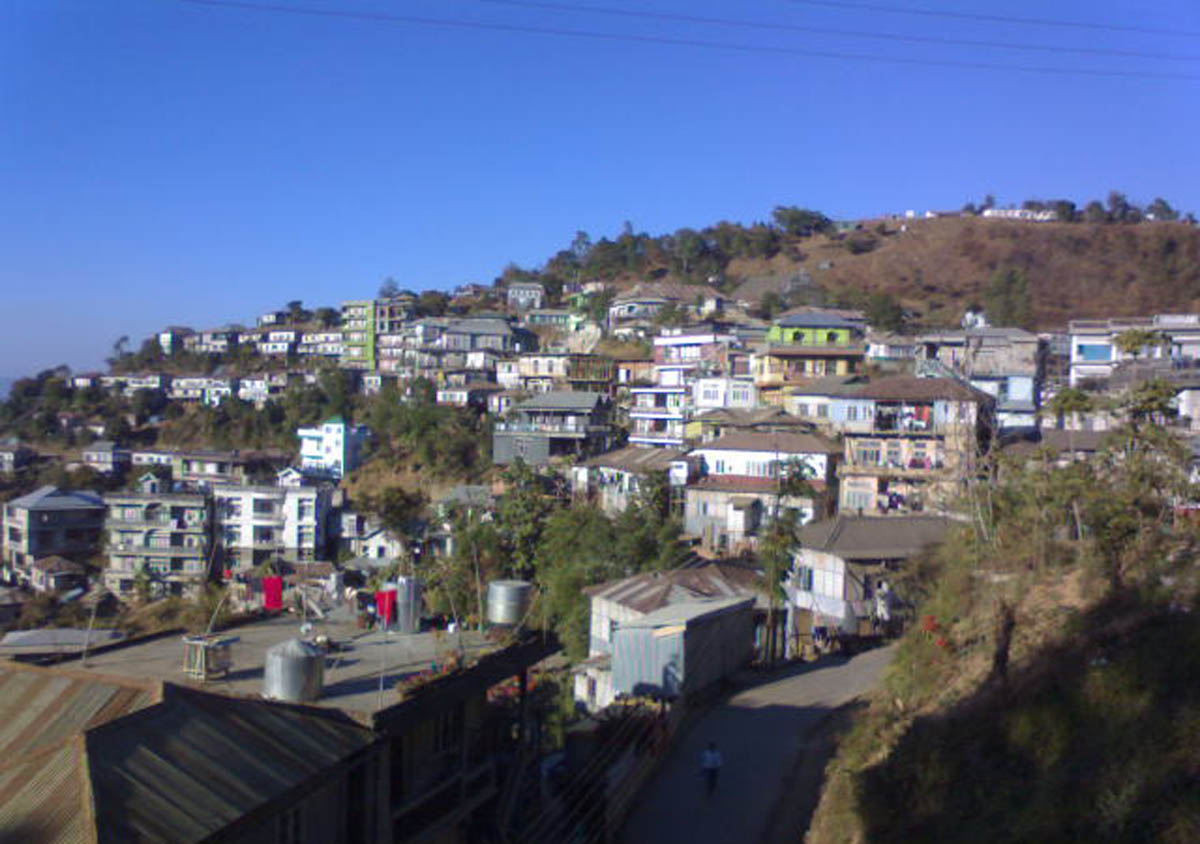
Serchhip Town from western side

=== Paragliding ===
Paragliding is a new sport for the people of Serchhip town. Fédération Aéronautique Internationale International Paragliding Accuracy Championship was held in Serchhip for the year 2020 and has become a major attraction in Mizoram.

== See also ==
- New Serchhip
- Tawi Wildlife Sanctuary
