= Aizawl =

Capital city of the Indian state of Mizoram

Aizawl Aijal
- Capital city of Mizoram
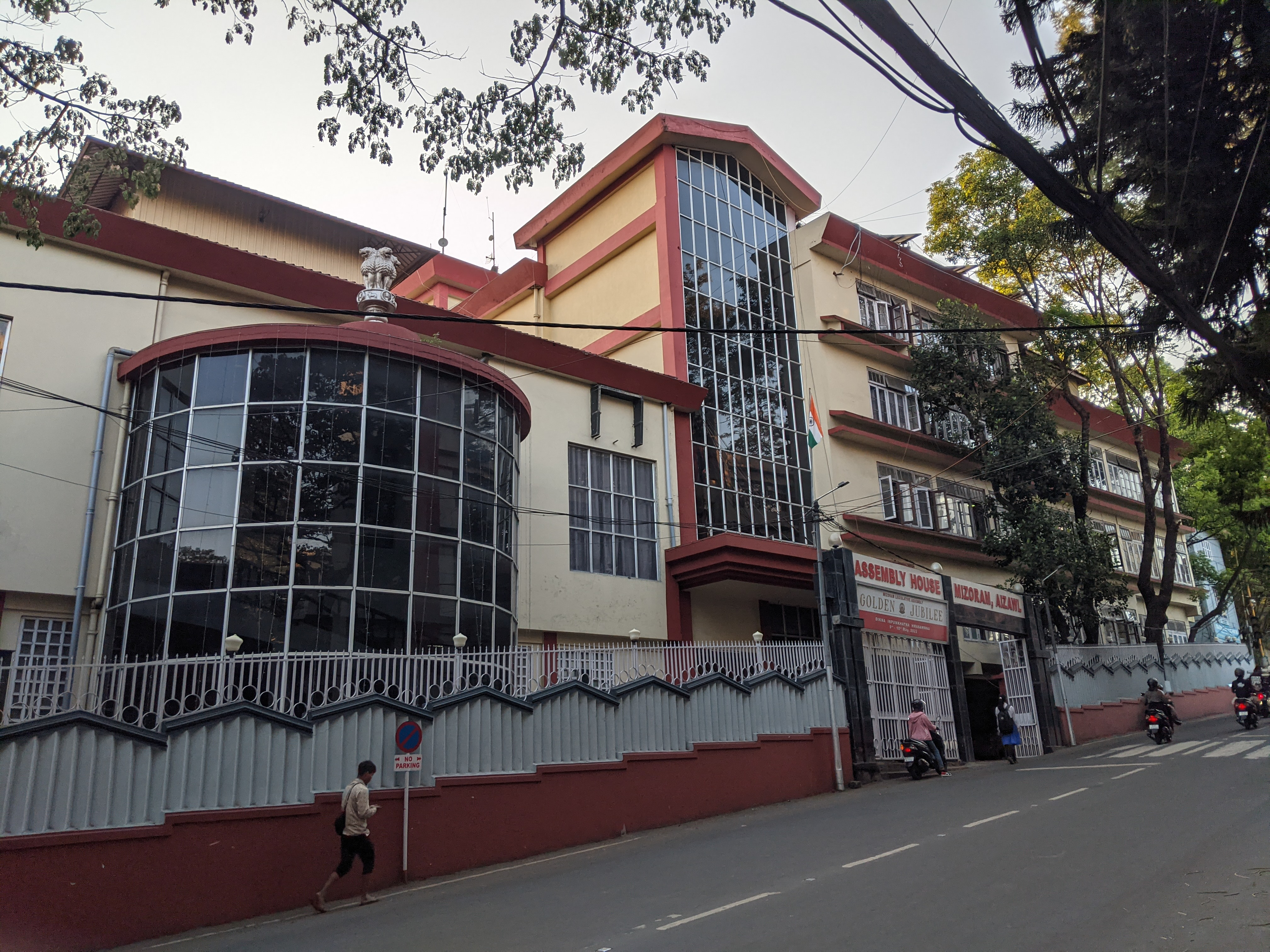
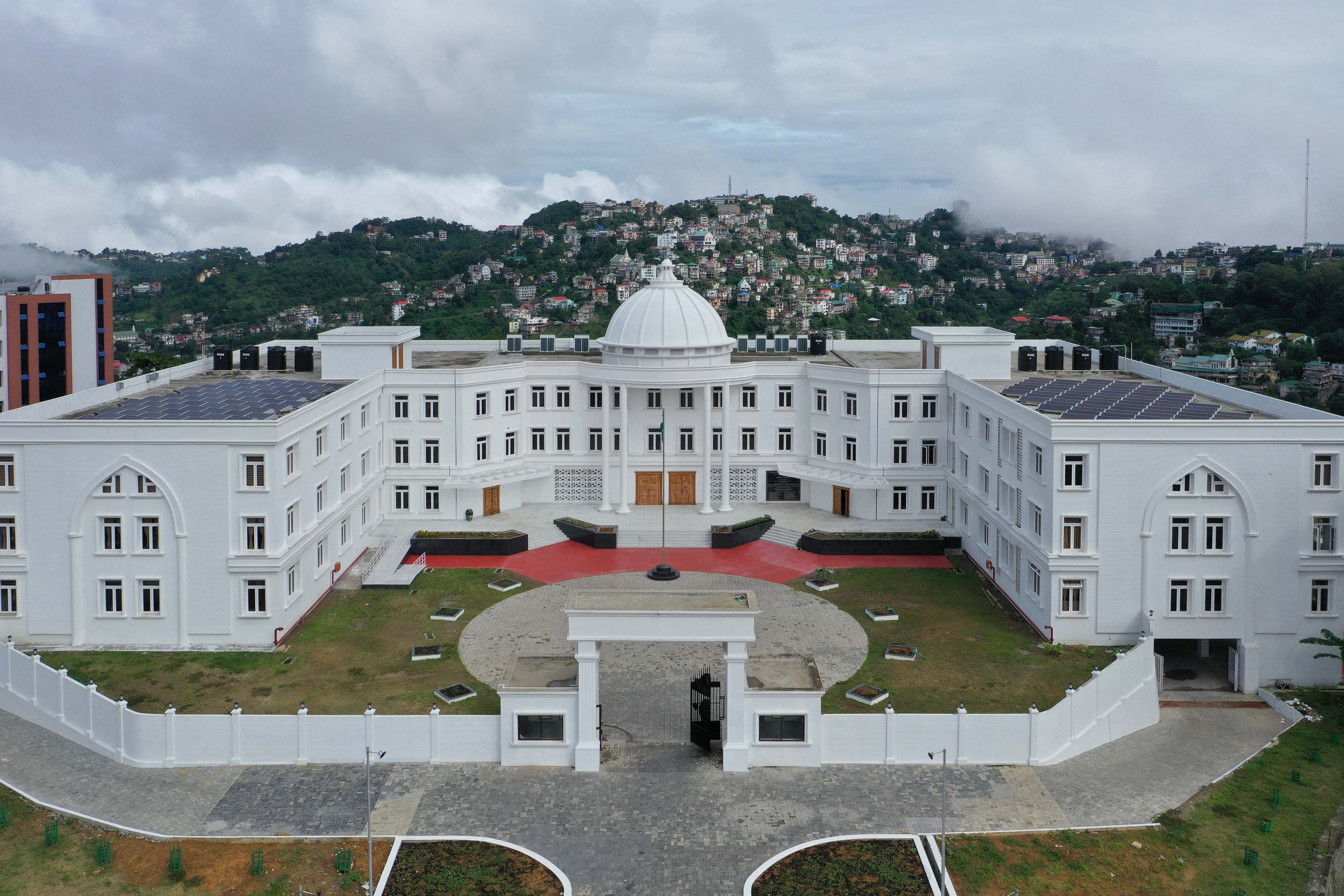
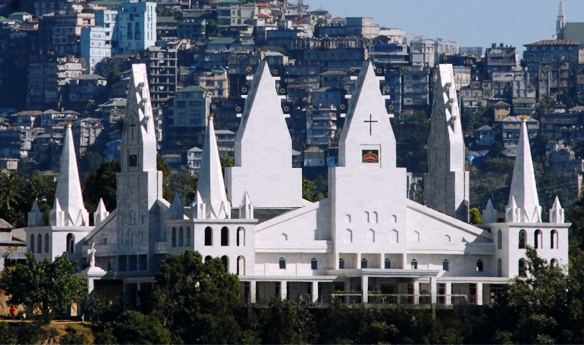
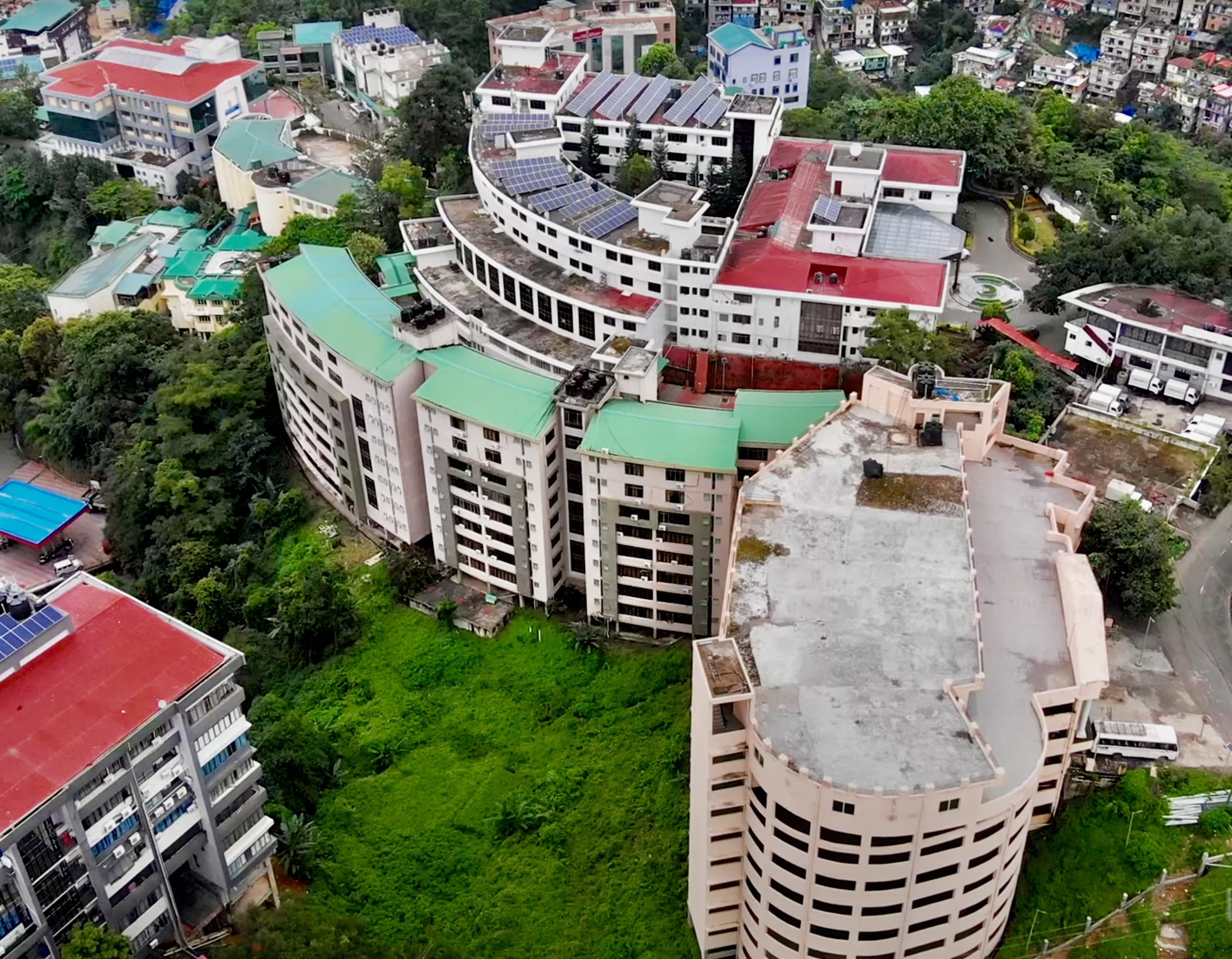
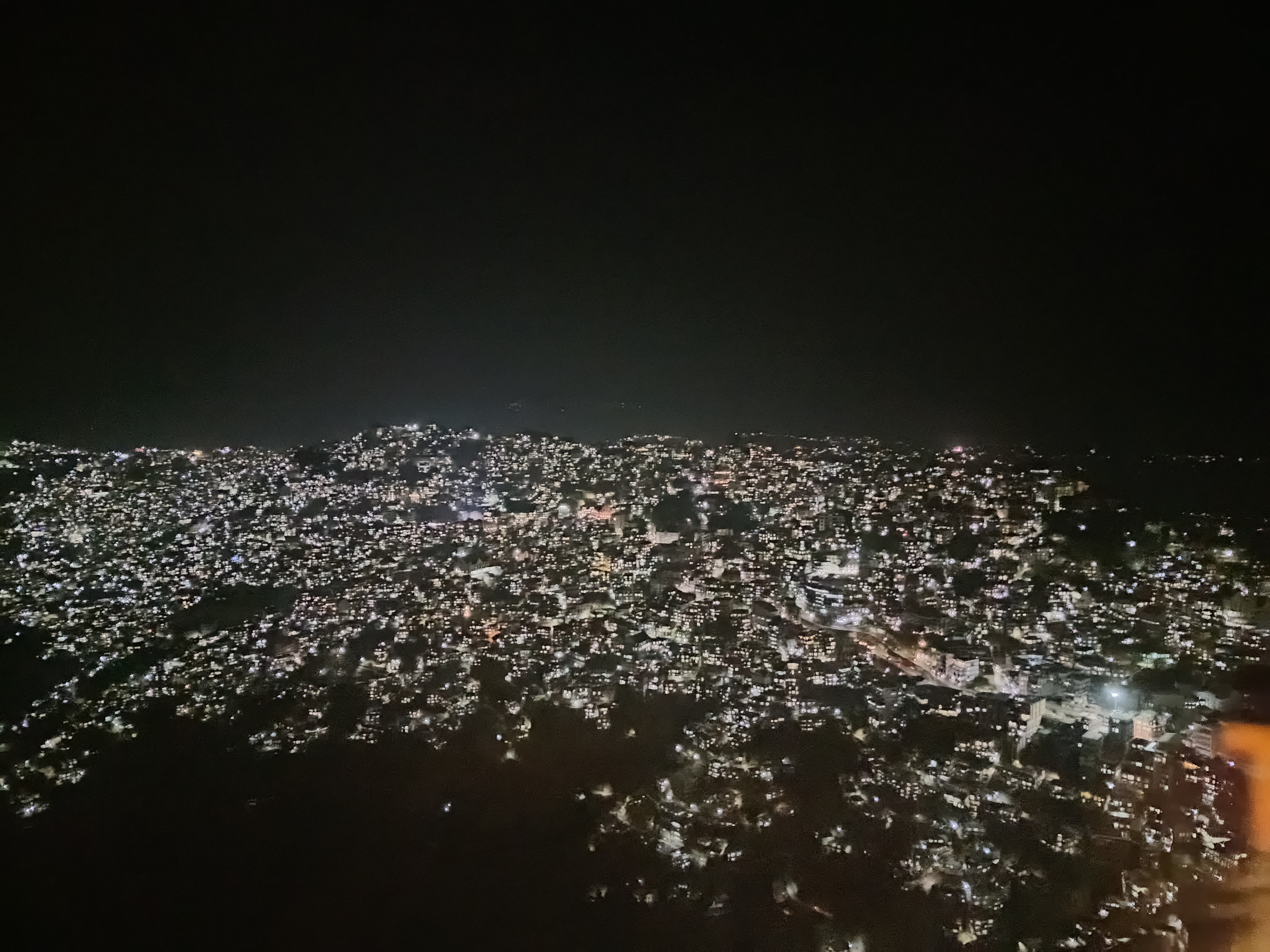
- Clockwise from top: Aizawl skyline, Gauhati High Court, Aizawl Bench, Mizoram Secretariat, Aizawl cityscape at night, Solomon's Temple, Mizoram Assembly House
- Nicknames: Zofate Jerusalem "The Jerusalem of the Zo people" Zawlkhawpui "The great zawl city"
- Location of Aizawl in India Aizawl (India) Aizawl (Asia)
- Coordinates: 23.733°N 92.718°E
- Country: India
- State: Mizoram
- District: Aizawl
- Established: 1889 As Fort Aijal

Government
  - Body: Aizawl Municipal corporation
  - Mayor: H Lalremtluanga (ZPM)

Area
  - Total: 129.91 km^{2} (50.16 sq mi)
- Elevation: 1,132 m (3,714 ft)

Population (2024)
  - Total: 405,000 (estimate)
  - Rank: 1st in Mizoram
  - Density: 2,253/km^{2} (5,840/sq mi)

Languages
  - Official: Mizo and English
- Time zone: UTC+5:30 (IST)
- PIN: 796001
- Telephone code: 0389
- Vehicle registration: MZ-01
- Sex ratio: 1025 females per 1000 males ♂/♀
- Climate: Cwa
- Literacy: 98.36%

Aizawl (English: /ˈaɪzɔːl/ EYE-zawl; Mizo: [ˈaɪ̯.ˈzɔːl]), formerly known as Aijal, is the capital city and the most populous city of Mizoram, India. It is also the third largest city in northeast India. It is situated atop a series of ridges, with an average elevation of around 1,132 metres (3,714 feet) above sea level. In 2024, the city has an estimated population of 415,000 people.

Having served as the capital of the British Lushai Hills from 1898 to 1947, colonial structures are prevalent in the city centre including but not limited to the Aijal Club, Raj Bhavan, the Red School, (Note: now part of Government Aizawl College) and the Office of the Deputy Commissioner. As the seat of the Government of Mizoram, Aizawl is home to the Assembly House. Additionally, Aizawl is part of the Smart Cities Mission, an initiative by the Ministry of Housing and Urban Affairs aimed at urban development and infrastructure enhancement.

== Etymology ==
The word Aizawl is a combination of two Mizo words: "ai" meaning "cardamom" and "zawl" meaning "flatland" or "plain." Therefore, "Aizawl" could roughly translate to "the field of cardamom." This name may have historical significance or could refer to the characteristics of the area before urbanisation.

== History ==
=== Pre-colonialism (before 1889) ===
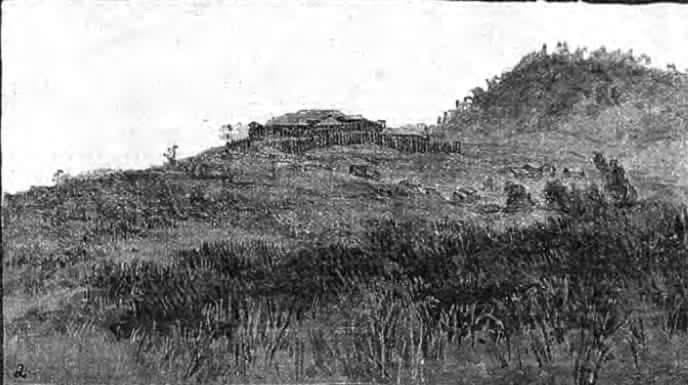
Fort Aijal in 1889

Before the British, Aizawl was a village founded by Chief Lalsavunga around 1810. When the British found the site it had been abandoned. During his reign at Aizawl, Lalsavunga summoned the properties of the Zadeng chiefs as a ransom for Ngurpuilala, the son of their chief Lalchungnunga. Lalsavunga freed the Zadeng bawi and gave them better rights. He lived in Aizawl around 1810–1820. Situated a mere 14 kilometres from Sairang and accessible via flat-bottomed boats, it served as a strategic location, with the Li Bial stream for the British to establish their headquarters.

=== Colonial Aijal (1889–1948) ===
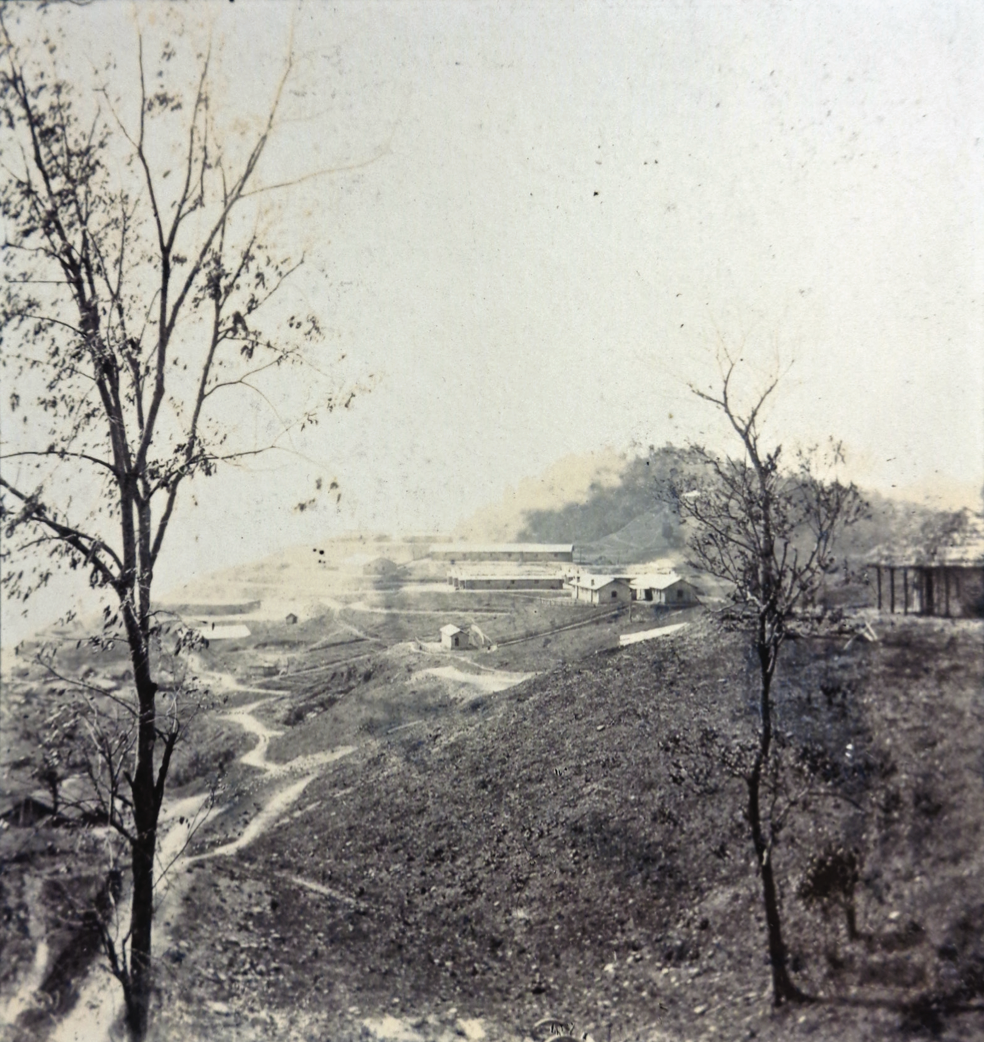
The northern end of Aijal in 1896

In 1889, Officer Dally of the Assam Police, accompanied by 400 men, arrived in Aizawl village to assist Colonel Skinner's troops during a British military operation against the Mizo natives. Aizawl was subsequently chosen as the site for a fortified post on Dally's recommendation, leading Colonel Skinner to oversee its construction. The troops erected stockades and other essential structures, establishing a significant military presence in the area. In the same year, Fort Aijal was established, a small village that became the capital of British administration in North Lushai Hills.

Aijal was formally established on 25 February 1890 as Fort Aijal. However, the communication system was not too good as there were little to no roads. The Silchar-Aizawl road was 175 km long but not an all-weather road, which was improved. In 1896, Fort Aijal became the headquarters of the Lushai Hills Military Police Battalion. Water scarcity was the primary concern for the original fort along with a lack of telegraph infrastructure.

Fort Aijal would subsequently be attacked by Khalkam and the western Lushai chiefs, which would begin the Lushai Rising on 9 September 1890. After the murder of Captain H.R. Browne, the western Lushai chiefs besieged Fort Aijal. Fort Aijal was commanded by surgeon H.B Melville. A relief force was brought in via the Dhaleswari river but its leader Lieutenant Swinton was fatally wounded during an ambush. He died on 26 September. Fort Aijal would be liberated on 4 October, with credit going to Melville and Lieutenant H.W.G. Cole for their defence.

The early era of Aizawl oversaw many vêngs (transl. quarters) with distinct populations. The Khasi vêng was full of skilled carpenters who were already Christian from missionary efforts in the Khasi hills. The Gurkha vêng was the quarter of soldiers and barracks. In the northern end of Aizawl lived many Punjabi builders. Bengalis functioned as bureaucrats in early Aizawl such as administration, post offices and public works department. The Santali were employed for coolie labour. The police force consisted of Assamese in the Chaprasi vêng. Many Mizos who visited Aizawl gave the journey the term Vai-kal (transl. going to the place of foreigners). Mizos were also appointed to local administratrive roles in maintaining newly built roads where they were placed in villages close to roads to weed out and keep contact with Aizawl. Aizawl also began to grow due to its reputation as the biggest market in the Lushai Hills at the time with products such as soap, clothes, salt which were sought after.

Since the roads were unusuable for wheeled transport, the system of transportation required coolies to lift supplies. In Aizawl the coolies and carriers resided in a Zawlbûk on the eastern end of Aizawl. The Zawlbûk in Rhasi vêng was the most popular at the time and had been erected by the government. Khasi evangelist Rai Bhajur used the Rhasi Zawlbûk to engage the gospel to the Mizos. Missionary David Evan Jones visited the Zawlbûk and sang hymns to the inhabitants, narrated the crucifixion of Christ and handed out stories for the literate youth.

Aizawl swiftly emerged as the administrative and religious hub for the Mizos, following the establishment of the Welsh Mission Society headquarters in the city. This led to a surge in population as Aizawl Bazar evolved into the primary commercial center of the Lushai Hills region.

=== Contemporary Aizawl (1948–present) ===
==== Capital of Mizo District, Assam, India (1948–1972) ====
The once modest village, situated on a level hilltop, underwent rapid expansion, transforming into a rugged and uneven settlement. The intensification of the Mautam famine in the late 1950s prompted an influx of people seeking sustenance and opportunities, further fuelling Aizawl's growth. Nearby villages like Chaltlang and Durtlang soon became absorbed into the expanding urban landscape, marking the transition of Aizawl into a modern cityscape by the early 1960s.

==== 1966 Mizo National Front Uprising ====
The expansion of Aizawl came to an abrupt halt in the mid-1960s due to the turmoil caused by the Mizo Independence Movement, spearheaded by the Mizo National Front (MNF), which engaged in open conflict with the Government of India. However, a pivotal and tragic event unfolded in Aizawl in March 1966, marking a dark chapter in its history.

In an effort to suppress the MNF's advances, on 5–6 March, the Government of India launched a devastating bombardment of Aizawl and its surrounding areas, resulting in significant loss of life. By this point, Aizawl had already been largely evacuated, with many seeking refuge in the nearby jungle. This unprecedented act of the Indian government, to conduct airstrikes in its own territory in urban areas, remains the first in Indian history.

==== Capital of Mizoram Union Territory (1972–1987) ====
Aizawl continued to be the capital of Mizoram after gaining the status of Union Territory. The UT status provided opportunities for economic growth and development in Aizawl. The city emerged as a key commercial and trade centre in the region, with Burmese ethnic Chin immigrants seeking better job opportunities in Aizawl.

==== Capital of State of Mizoram (1987–present) ====
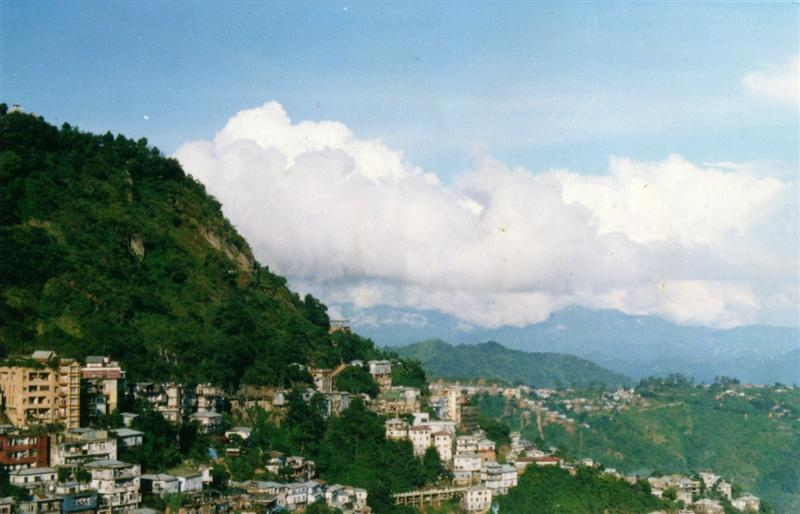
Aizawl in the 2000s

Statehood provided Aizawl with enhanced access to resources, funding, and developmental schemes from the central government. This facilitated the implementation of infrastructure projects, such as Lengpui Airport, educational initiatives, healthcare programs, and poverty alleviation measures aimed at fostering socio-economic growth and improving the quality of life for its citizens.

On 25 May 2025, Chief Minister Lalduhoma raised the need for developing a new city in Mizoram at the NITI Aayog meeting, stressing that 80 per cent of the state's population lived in the capital Aizawl. Speaking at the meeting in New Delhi, he said Aizawl had become congested and he proposed Thenzawl in Serchhip district, about 93 km from Aizawl, as the site for the new city, which would be able to accommodate 10–1.5 million residents.

== Geography and Climate ==
=== Geography ===
Aizawl lies at approximately 23°43′N, 92°43′E and is perched on the ridge of a hill at an average elevation of 1,132 meters (3,714 feet) above sea level. The topography features steep slopes, with elevations ranging from 60 meters to 1,509 meters, making the city a mix of rugged terrains. Aizawl is surrounded by lush greenery and is part of the Eastern Himalayan foothills.

=== Climate ===
The city is located at the north of the Tropic of Cancer in the northern part of Mizoram, with the Tlawng river valley to its west and the Tuirial river valley to its east. Aizawl experiences a humid subtropical climate (Cwa) under the Köppen classification. Summers are moderately warm with temperatures averaging between 20–30 °C (68–86 °F), while winters are cooler with temperatures ranging from 11–21 °C (52–70 °F). The city receives most of its rainfall from April to October, peaking in the months of May, July, August, and September. The remaining months are relatively dry. Aizawl is ranked second best city in India for having the 'cleanest air and best AQI' in 2024.

Climate data for Aizawl, elevation 950 m (3,120 ft), (1991–2020, extremes 1973–2010)
Month	Jan	Feb	Mar	Apr	May	Jun	Jul	Aug	Sep	Oct	Nov	Dec	Year
Record high °C (°F)	29.5 (85.1)	33.8 (92.8)	34.6 (94.3)	35.5 (95.9)	34.2 (93.6)	33.6 (92.5)	33.2 (91.8)	32.2 (90.0)	32.7 (90.9)	33.1 (91.6)	32.8 (91.0)	28.5 (83.3)	35.5 (95.9)
Mean daily maximum °C (°F)	23.3 (73.9)	24.8 (76.6)	28.1 (82.6)	28.8 (83.8)	28.0 (82.4)	27.2 (81.0)	27.0 (80.6)	27.5 (81.5)	27.3 (81.1)	27.2 (81.0)	26.0 (78.8)	23.8 (74.8)	26.6 (79.9)
Mean daily minimum °C (°F)	11.3 (52.3)	13.0 (55.4)	16.4 (61.5)	17.5 (63.5)	18.7 (65.7)	19.5 (67.1)	20.2 (68.4)	20.1 (68.2)	19.6 (67.3)	19.1 (66.4)	15.9 (60.6)	12.6 (54.7)	16.9 (62.4)
Record low °C (°F)	5.1 (41.2)	5.0 (41.0)	5.5 (41.9)	6.9 (44.4)	11.8 (53.2)	9.2 (48.6)	12.0 (53.6)	10.5 (50.9)	10.7 (51.3)	10.1 (50.2)	10.0 (50.0)	4.5 (40.1)	6.1 (43.0)
Average rainfall mm (inches)	9.1 (0.36)	19.4 (0.76)	71.5 (2.81)	134.2 (5.28)	322.5 (12.70)	311.0 (12.24)	326.6 (12.86)	342.2 (13.47)	337.9 (13.30)	173.0 (6.81)	42.5 (1.67)	10.6 (0.42)	2,100.5 (82.70)
Average rainy days	0.8	1.7	3.9	7.9	14.1	17.3	18.9	18.7	15.3	10.0	2.2	0.7	111.5
Source: India Meteorological Department

Aizawl

Climate chart (precipitation, max. and min. temperature)
J	F	M	A	M	J	J	A	S	O	N	D
13 20 11	23 22 13	73 25 16	168 27 18	289 26 18	406 26 19	320 25 19	321 26 19	305 26 19	184 25 18	43 23 15	15 21 12
- █ Average max. and min. temperatures in °C
- █ Precipitation totals in mm
- Source: WMO
Imperial conversion
J	F	M	A	M	J	J	A	S	O	N	D
0.5 69 53	0.9 71 55	2.9 77 60	6.6 80 64	11 79 65	16 78 66	13 78 66	13 78 66	12 78 67	7.2 76 64	1.7 73 59	0.6 70 54
- █ Average max. and min. temperatures in °F
- █ Precipitation totals in inches

== Civic Administration ==
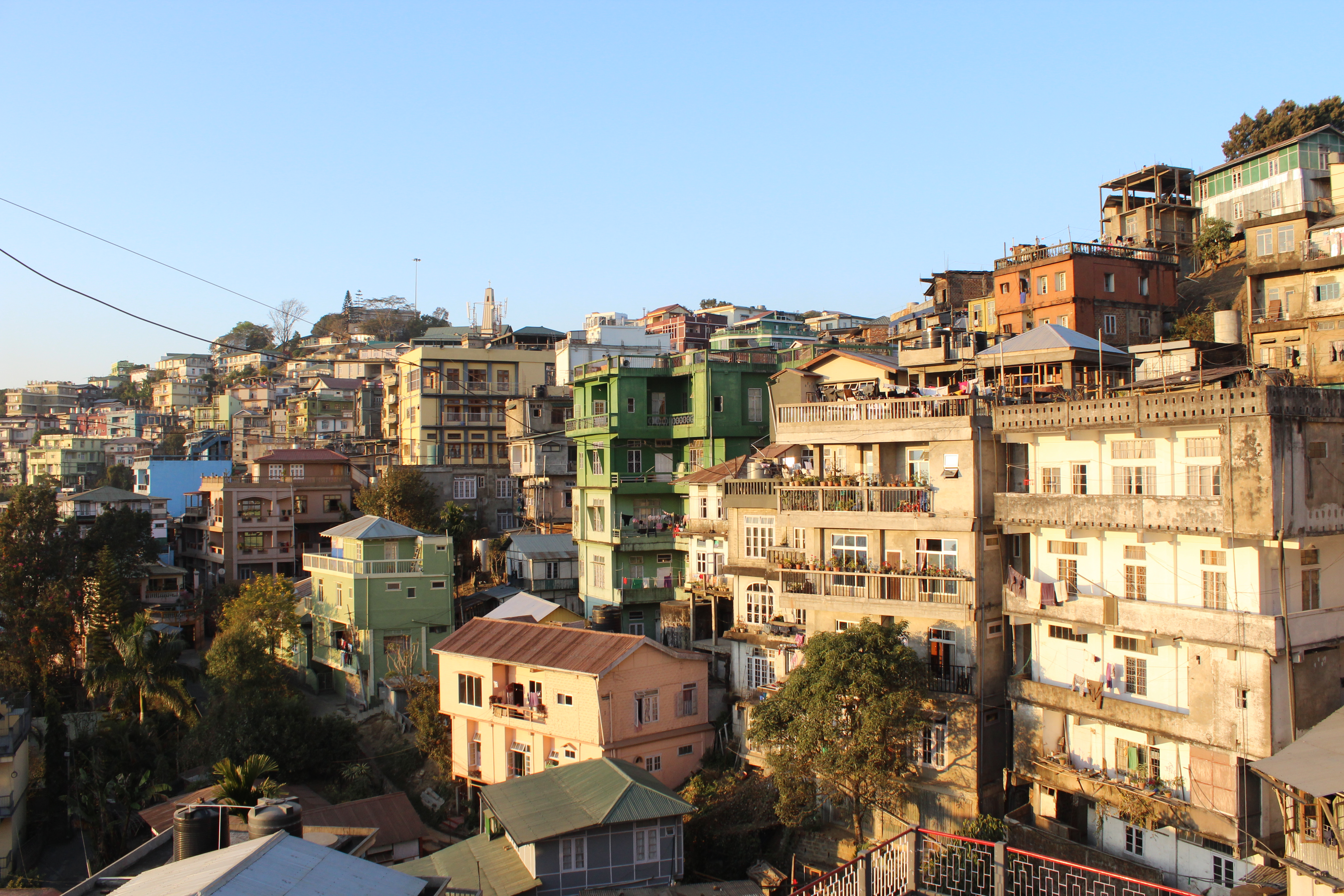
Aizawl city

The Municipal Council of Aizawl was established on July 1, 2008 and upgraded into a Municipal Corporation on October 15, 2015 by the Fourth Amendment of The Mizoram Municipalities Act, 2007.

The Aizawl Municipal Corporation is governed under the Mizoram Municipalities Acts, 2007. Aizawl is administered by the Aizawl Municipal Corporation (AMC), established in 2010 to oversee urban planning, sanitation, waste management, and infrastructure development within the city. The AMC consists of 19 elected members representing the city's wards, along with additional members appointed by the Governor of Mizoram. To promote gender representation, one-third of the total seats are reserved for women, with these reserved seats rotated every five years. The current Municipal Commissioner of Aizawl is Joseph H Lalramsanga.

There are 19 Administrative Wards under the Aizawl Municipal Corporation. Each ward is managed by a Ward Committee, which is headed by the elected councillor of the ward. The committee also includes two members each from the local councils within the ward. The city comprises 78 local councils, representing the city's localities. Serving a term of five years, the councils work in close coordination with the AMC to address local governance and community issues.

== Demographics ==
Historical population
Year	Pop.	±%
1951	6,950	—
1961	15,329	+120.6%
1971	32,412	+111.4%
1981	75,922	+134.2%
1991	156,687	+106.4%
2001	228,280	+45.7%
2011	293,416	+28.5%
Source: Census of India

Religion in Aizawl City (2011)
Religion	Percentage
Christianity	93.63%
Hinduism	4.14%
Islam	1.52%
Buddhism	0.45%
Not Stated	0.11%
Others	0.09%
Sikhism	0.03%
Jainism	0.02%

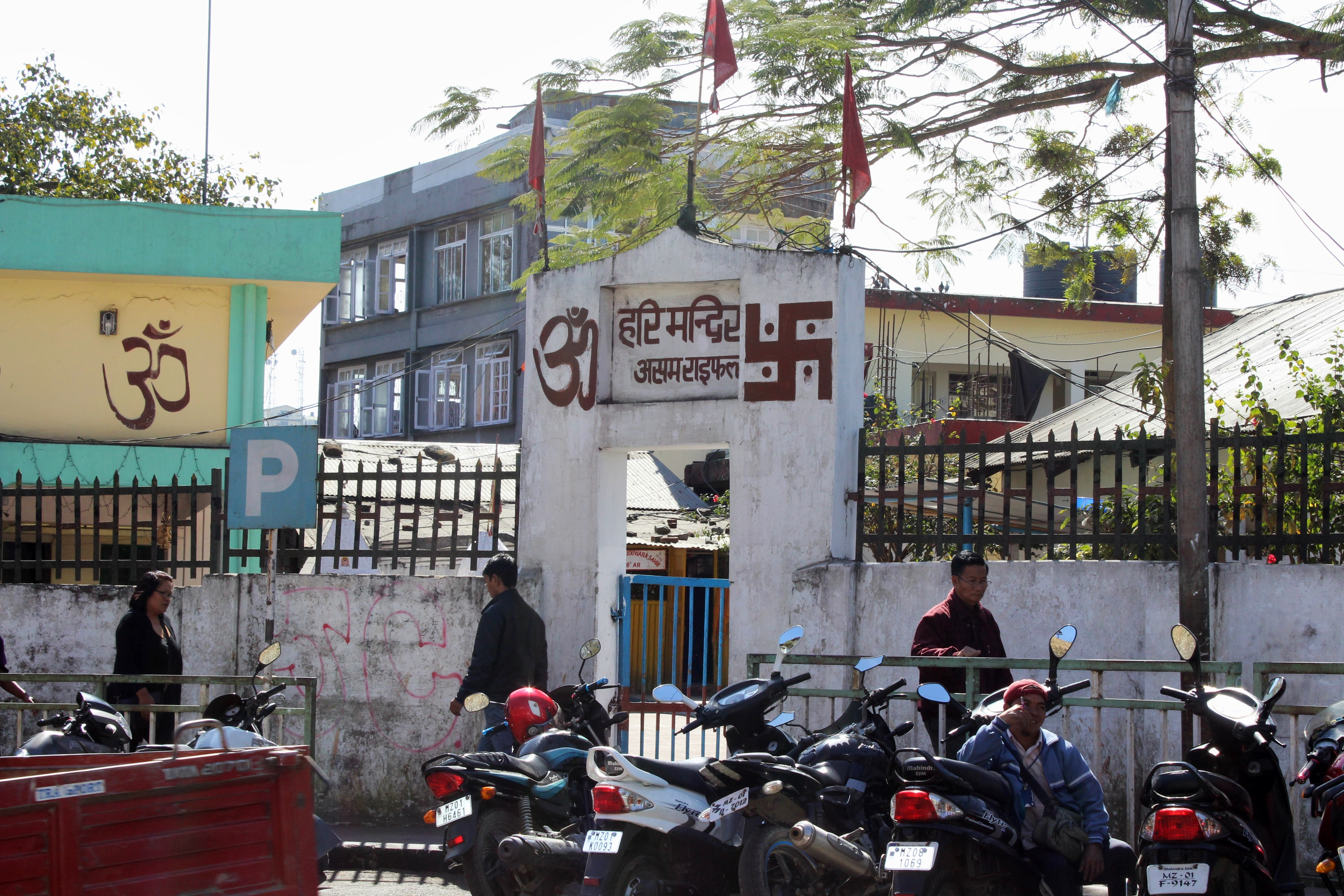
Hindu temple in Dawrpui, Aizawl

As per the 2011 census of India, Aizawl recorded a population of 293,416, with females constituting 50.61% and males accounting for 49.39%. The sex ratio stands at 1,025 females per 1,000 males, reflecting a favourable balance. Among children aged 0–6 years, the child sex ratio is slightly lower, with 983 girls per 1,000 boys.

=== Religion ===
Christianity is the dominant religion, with 93.63% of the population adhering to it. Among the minority religions, Hinduism accounts for 4.14%, Islam 1.52%, Buddhism 0.45%, Sikhism 0.03%, and Jainism 0.02%. Additionally, 0.11% of the population did not specify their religious affiliation.

As of 1910, there were 777 army personnel in Aizawl from different parts of North India as well as Nepal. The Gurkha's among the soldiers eventually settled in Aizawl.

=== Media ===
Aizawl is home to regional and national television broadcasting. Channels such as Zonet Cable TV Pvt. Ltd., and LPS Vision Production offer state and national programs in Mizo while Doordarshan Aizawl offers both Mizo and English, reflecting the region's bilingual character. Miss Mizoram, Mizo Idol, and the Ṭhazual Awards are led by Zonet.

Radio remains a popular medium in Aizawl. All India Radio (AIR) Aizawl broadcasts in Mizo, English, and occasionally in other regional languages, focusing on news, educational content, and cultural programs. FM radio stations like FM Zoawi and LPS FM are widely listened to, offering a mix of music, entertainment, and live shows.

Vanglaini, the leading daily newspaper in Mizoram, is a significant part of Aizawl's print media landscape. Published entirely in the Mizo language, it serves as the primary source of local, regional, and national news for Mizoram's residents. The paper covers a wide range of topics, including politics, social issues, culture, education, and sports, while also offering editorials and opinion pieces reflective of the state's unique perspectives.,

The major media in Aizawl in the Mizo and English languages are:

- Vanglaini,
- The Zozam Times
- The Aizawl Post.
- India Today NE
- Khawpui Aw
- Virthli
- The Mizoram Post
- Zoram Tlangau
- Mizo Arsi
- Zalen
- Zawlaidi
- Zozam Weekly
- Zoram Thlirtu
- Sakeibaknei
- Entlang

=== Lifestyle ===
Chapchar Kut, one of Mizoram's most cherished festivals, signals the arrival of spring and is celebrated with enthusiasm and grandeur. Held annually in March, it marks the completion of jhum (slash-and-burn) cultivation preparations. It is usually held on a mass scale at the Assam Rifles Parade ground (Lammual). On the roads, people would stand with a plate of boiled eggs and give it to passers-by, a pre-Christian tradition called Chhawnghnawh.

On Christmas, Kawnchei (lit. 'junction decoration') is a centerpiece of life in Aizawl, led by the Aizawl Municipal Corporation. The Kawnchei tradition results in a festive glow with illuminated streets, decorated churches, and vibrant carol-singing. The spirit of the season is deeply rooted in family gatherings, sharing meals, and attending church services. Traditional Mizo dishes, often prepared during this time, add a culinary delight to the celebrations.

== Economy ==
Aizawl serves as the commercial and economic centre for the state. Its economy is predominantly service-oriented with education, public administration, tourism, and commerce providing considerable employment and income. Agriculture and horticulture remain important in the surrounding region: producing rice, maize, pineapples, oranges, bananas, and other crops, while bamboo, cane and forest-based handicrafts provide local income. Despite limited industrial growth due to weak transportation, infrastructure, and mineral resources, small-scale and handloom industries continue to play an important role. Sericulture and hydropower present additional growth opportunities, while the city's highly literate workforce encourages further expansion of the tertiary service sector.

== Transport ==
=== Air ===
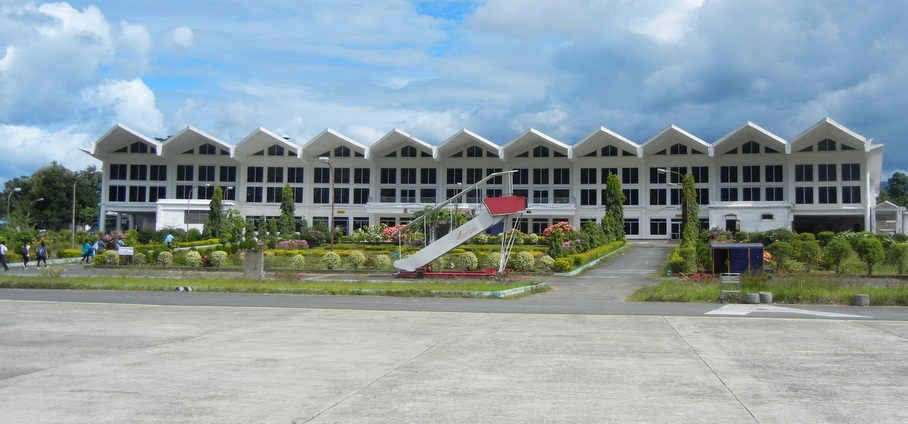
Lengpui Airport

Aizawl is connected by air transport through Lengpui Airport which it is situated near Aizawl. The airport provides connectivity to Kolkata, Delhi, Guwahati, Agartala, Shillong and Imphal, operated by Air India, Go First and IndiGo. A helicopter service by Pawan Hans was started in 2012 and connects the city with Lunglei, Lawngtlai, Saiha, Chawngte, Serchhip, Champhai, Kolasib, Khawzawl, Ngopa and Hnahthial.

=== Rail ===
The Sairang Railway Station of Aizawl was developed as part of the Bairabi–Sairang railway line, a 51.38 km broad-gauge project connecting Bairabi in Assam to Sairang, approximately 15 km from Aizawl, the capital of Mizoram. Initially proposed in 1998, the project received formal approval from the Indian government in 2008–09 and was declared a National Project to expedite its completion. Construction commenced in November 2014, with the foundation stone for Sairang station laid by then-Railway Minister Suresh Prabhu on 11 November 2016.

The project faced significant challenges, including difficult terrain, limited working seasons, and a tragic bridge collapse in August 2023, which resulted in the loss of 26 lives. Despite these setbacks, the line was successfully completed and received Commissioner of Railway Safety (CRS) authorization in June 2025, marking a major milestone in connecting Mizoram's capital to the national railway network.

On 13 September 2025, Prime Minister Narendra Modi officially inaugurated the Sairang Railway Station, connecting Mizoram's capital region to the Indian Railways network. During the ceremony, he flagged off passenger train services, including the Aizawl–Delhi Rajdhani Express, Aizawl–Kolkata Express, and Aizawl–Guwahati Express, to expand regional passenger Infrastructure. Developed as a terminal hub, the station's construction plan includes subsequent infrastructure expansion and additional transport service rollouts to accommodate long term passenger and freight demand in the region.

== Education ==
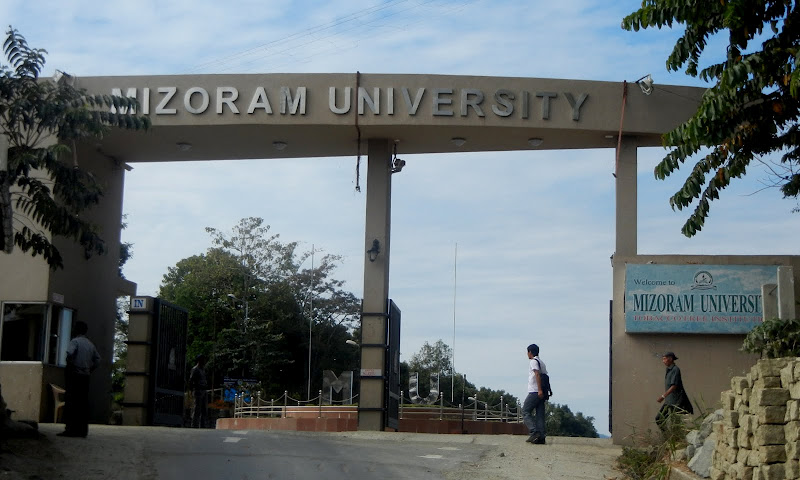
Mizoram University Entrance

The literacy rate in Aizawl city, as of the 2011 Census, is approximately 98.4%, one of the highest in India. This includes 99% literacy among males and 98% among females.

The education system in Aizawl includes primary, secondary, and higher education institutions. Aizawl also hosts Mizoram University, established in 2001, which offers diverse undergraduate, postgraduate, and doctoral programs. The presence of specialised institutes like the Indian Institute of Mass Communication and the National Institute of Electronics and Information Technology (NIELIT) further strengthens the city's academic infrastructure.

Pachhunga University College was among the earliest colleges founded in 1958. Aizawl College, the second oldest college in Aizawl City was established in the year 1975. Hrangbana College was established in 1980, located in Chanmari, Aizawl, it has 57 teaching staff with 22 non-teaching staff and more than 2,000 students in the commerce and arts departments. Mizoram University established in 2001 provides affiliation to all the colleges in Mizoram. Mizoram University also provides post-graduate education as well as BTech education and other departments. ICFAI University, Mizoram located in Durtlang, Aizawl West College, Government Aizawl North College, J. Thankima College, Govt.Zirtiri Residential Science College also provides undergraduate courses. Mizoram Law College provides education to people who seek a profession in Law. Indian Institute of Mass Communication and National Institute of Technology Mizoram has already started operations. Zoram Medical College is inaugurated on 7 August 2018 in Falkawn.

== Sports ==
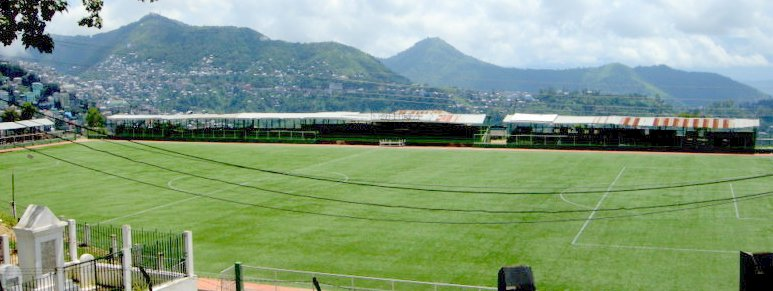
Lammual Stadium

Football is the most popular sport in Mizoram, with several footballers playing in national leagues in different parts of India. The city's professional football club, Aizawl F.C, competed in the I-League from 2015 to 2025. Some of the important sporting facilities in Aizawl are:

1. Rajiv Gandhi Stadium, with a seating capacity of 20,000, is located at Mualpui in Aizawl.
2. Hawla Indoor Stadium is the largest indoor stadium with basketball, badminton and boxing facilities.
3. Lammual stadium is a single tier stadium. The stadium under construction will have a seating capacity of about 5,000 spectators.

Team	Sport	League	Venue
Mizoram football team	Football	Santosh Trophy	Rajiv Gandhi Stadium
Aizawl F.C.	Football	Mizoram Premier League	Rajiv Gandhi Stadium
Chanmari F.C.	Football	Indian Football League	Rajiv Gandhi Stadium
Chawnpui F.C.	Football	Mizoram Premier League	Lammual/Vaivakawn field

Aizawl hosted the third edition of Xchange North East Youth NGO summit from 3 to 5 October 2018.

== See also ==
- Aizawl FC
- Aizawl Monorail
- Advanced Research Centre for Bamboo and Rattan, Aizawl, Mizoram
- Aizawl Theological College
- Tourism in North East India

== Sources ==
- Chatterjee, Suhas (1985). British rule in Mizoram. New Delhi: Mittal Publications.
- Lloyd, J. Meirion (1991). History of the Church in Mizoram: Harvest in the Hills. Synod Publication Board. pp. 17–23.
- McCall, Anthony Gilchrist (1949). Lushai Chrysalis. London: Luzac.
- Reid, Robert (1942). The Lushai Hills: culled from History of the frontier areas bordering on Assam from 1883–1941. Calcutta: Firma KLM.
- Chatterjee, Suhas (1990). Mizo Encyclopaedia. Aizawl: Jaico Publishing House.
