= Luangpawn =

Village in Mizoram, India

- Village
- Interactive map of Luangpawn
- Coordinates: 23°51′32″N 93°05′07″E
- Country: India
- State: Mizoram
- District: Saitual
- Block: Phullen Block

Population (2011)
  - Total: 469

Languages
  - Official: Mizo, English
- Time zone: UTC+5:30 (IST)
- 2011 census code: 271224

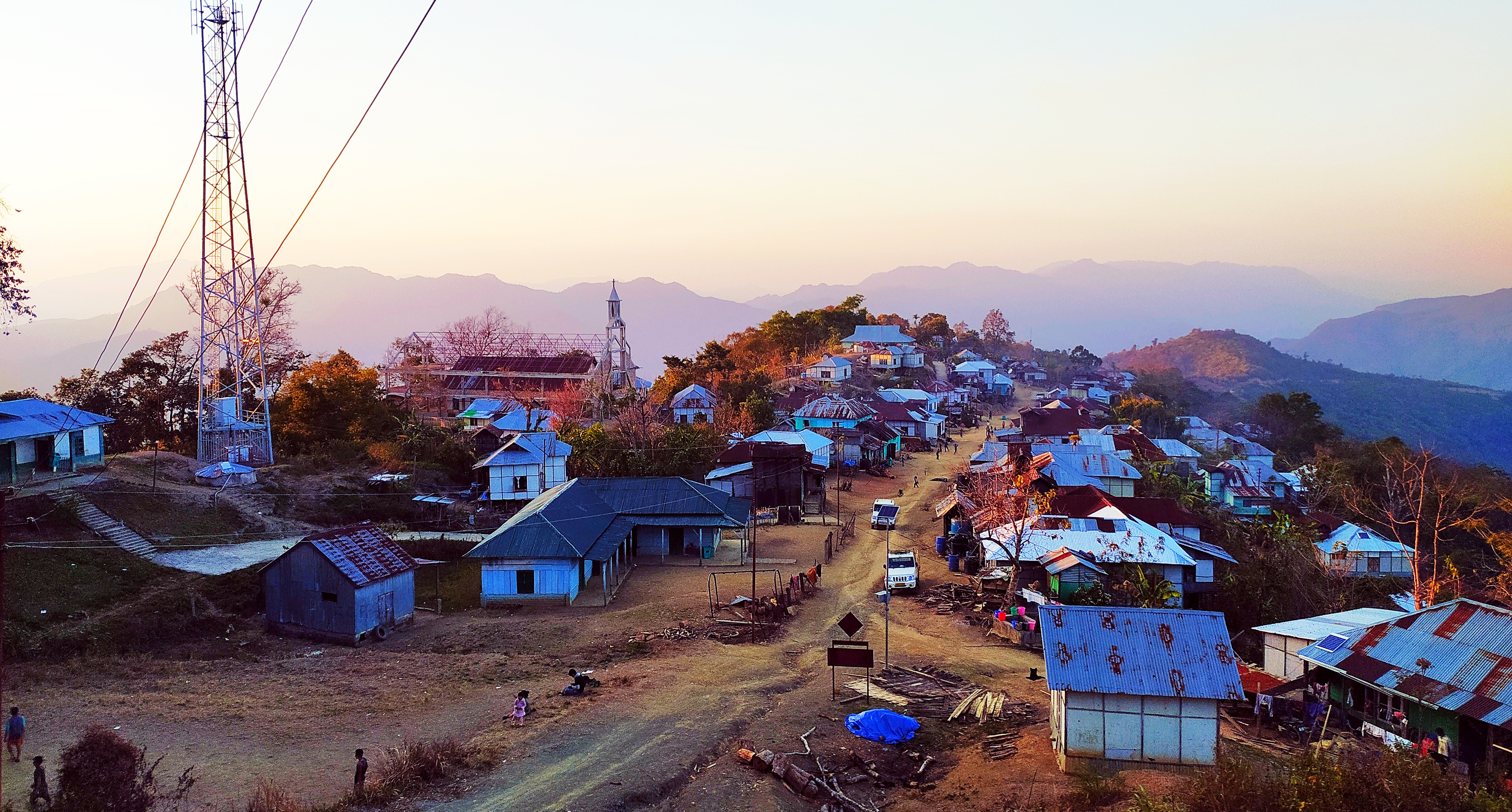
Luangpawn Village

Luangpawn is a village in Saitual district, Mizoram, India, under Phullen Block. The village is located on the Mawmrang hill and is surrounded by forested terrain and cliffs. It is connected to nearby settlements and district centers by a road.

== History ==
Luangpawn was established in 1893 by Lalbawnga (Bawitlung) and his followers. The settlement was completed by 1906. Lalbawnga was succeeded as chief of Luangpawn by Lalbuaia Sailo, who was appointed in late 1912 at Lalbawnga's request.

During the Mizo insurgency in the late 1960s, the village was temporarily abandoned, and residents were relocated to Phullen on 14–15 April 1968. The villagers returned in the early 1970s and re-established Luangpawn as a permanent settlement, with a new Village Council formed on 23 February 1983.

The traditional chieftainship system was replaced by the Village Council system in 1954, and Luangpawn has since been administered by an elected Village Council.

== Demographics ==
According to the 2011 Census of India, Luangpawn has a population of 469, with a literacy rate of 94.49%. The majority of the population belongs to Scheduled Tribes.

== Economy ==
Agriculture is the main source of livelihood in Luangpawn. Jhum (shifting) cultivation is widely practiced, along with small-scale trade and local economic activities.

== Religion ==
Christianity was introduced in Luangpawn in 1908. The Luangpawn Presbyterian Church was established in 1910 and remains the primary Christian denomination in the village.

== Education and institutions ==
Luangpawn has government educational institutions, including a primary school, a middle school, and a community run high school. The village also has an Anganwadi Centre and local units of community organizations such as the Young Mizo Association (YMA) and Mizo Hmeichhe Insuihkhawm Pawl (MHIP).
