= Lungsum =

Village in Aizawl district, Mizoram, India

- Village
- Location of Lungsum in Mizoram, India Lungsum (India)
- Coordinates: 24.1539°N 92.9441°E
- Country: India
- State: Mizoram
- District: Aizawl
- Block: Darlawn

Government
  - Body: Village Council
- Elevation: 48 m (157 ft)

Population (2011)
  - Total: 413

Languages
  - Official: Mizo, Hindi, English
- Time zone: UTC+05:30 (IST)
- PIN: 796111
- Area code: 0389
- Vehicle registration: MZ
- Census village code: 271200

Lungsum is a village in the Darlawn Community Development Block in the Aizawl district, Mizoram, India and the nearest town is Darlawn, located about 11 km (6.8 mi)away. According to the 2011 Census, Lungsum had a population of 413 people living in 95 households, with a literacy rate of 91.28%.

Lungsum has the postal PIN code 796111. Lungsum is one of the constituent villages of the Sinlung Hills Council and falls under the New Vervek constituency.

== Lungsum village council ==
As per Directorate of Local Administration Department, Government of Mizoram, Lalduhawma is the current president of Lungsum village council.

== See also ==
- Aizawl
