= Ratu, Mizoram =

Village in Aizawl district, Mizoram, India

Ratu
- Village
- Location of Ratu in Mizoram, India Ratu (India)
- Coordinates: 24.23°N 92.93°E
- Country: India
- State: Mizoram
- District: Aizawl
- Block: Darlawn
- Established: 1900

Government
  - Body: Village Council

Population (2011)
  - Total: 2,176

Languages
  - Official: Mizo, Hindi, English
- Time zone: UTC+05:30 (IST)
- PIN: 796111
- Area code: 0389
- Vehicle registration: MZ
- Census village code: 271201

Ratu is a village in the Darlawn Community Development Block in the Aizawl district, Mizoram, India. According to the 2011 Census, Ratu had a population of 2176 people living in 435 households, with a literacy rate of 93.39%. Ratu has the postal PIN code 796111, which is also known as the ZIP code or postal code of the village. Ratu is one of the constituent villages of the Sinlung Hills Council and falls under the Ratu constituency.

== Ratu village council members (2025-2030) ==
Ratu village council members (2025-2030)
Position	Name
President	Saizawna Sailo
Vice President	Zonunsanga Zote
Secretary	Vanlalpeka
Treasurer	Lalroluahpuia
Member	Lalnuntluangi
Member	Malsawmzuala
Member	K. Lalnunmawia
Member	Lalhriatpuii

== See also ==
- Aizawl
- Aizawl district
