= Vaitin =

Village in Mizoram, India

- Village
- Location in Mizoram, India Vaitin (India)
- Coordinates: 24°13′27″N 92°58′40″E
- Country: India
- State: Mizoram
- District: Aizawl
- Block: Darlawn

Population (2011)
  - Total: 1,069

Languages
  - Official: Mizo, English
- Time zone: UTC+5:30 (IST)
- PIN: 796111
- Telephone code: 0389
- Vehicle registration: MZ

Vaitin is a village in the Darlawn Community Development Block in the Aizawl district, Mizoram, India and the nearest town is Aizawl, located about 175 km away. According to the 2011 Census, Vaitin had a population of 1,069 people living in 214 households, with a literacy rate of 93.81%. Vaitin has the postal PIN code 796111. Vaitin is one of the constituent villages of the Sinlung Hills Council and falls under the Sakawrdai North constituency.

== Vaitin village council members (2025-2030) ==
Vaitin village council members (2025-2030)
Position	Name
President	Lalruala
Vice President	Amena
Secretary	Hmarramsiem Neingaite
Treasurer	Lalnunfela
Member	Lalengzuala
Member	Zosaptlingi

== See also ==
- Aizawl
- Aizawl district
