= Vanbawng =

- Village
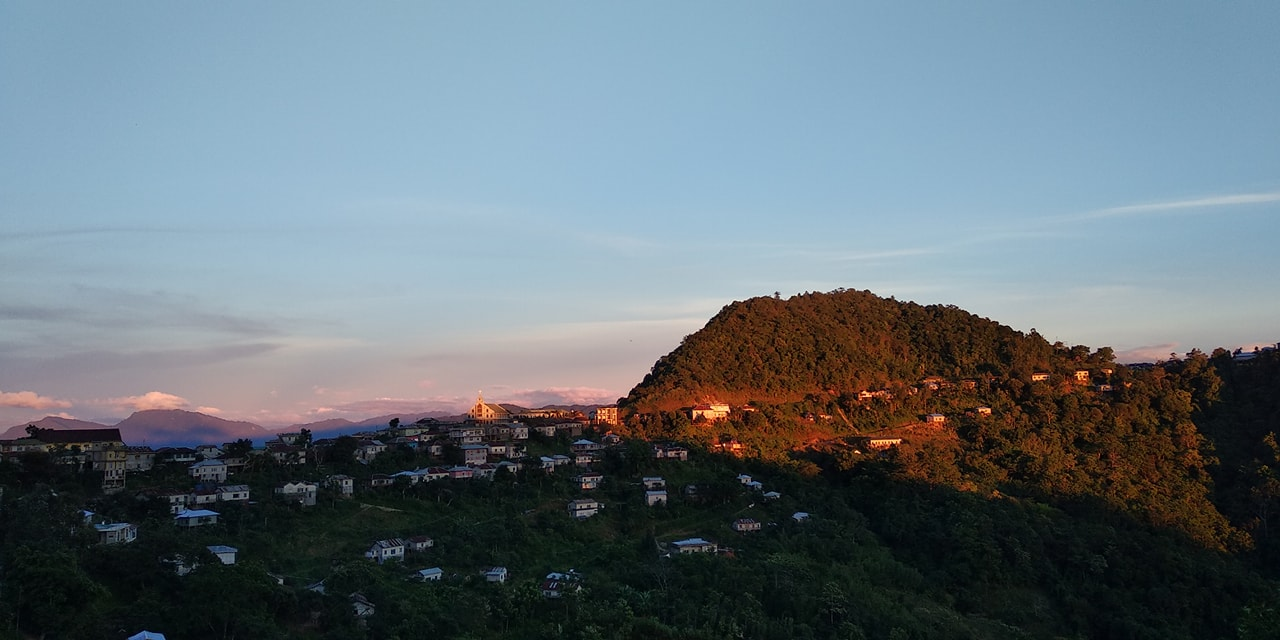

- Location in Mizoram Location in Indian
- Coordinates: 24°02′30″N 93°02′46″E
- Country: India
- State: Mizoram
- District: Saitual

Languages
  - Official: Hmar, Mizo and English
- Time zone: UTC+5:30 (IST)
- PIN: 796261
- Telephone code: 0389
- Vehicle registration: MZ-09
- Sex ratio: 622 females per 609 males ♂/♀
- Climate: Cwa
- Literacy: 98.17%

Vanbawng is a village in the Phullen Block of Saitual district, in the state of Mizoram in India.

== Population ==
15.84% (195 people) of Vanbawng's population are between 0–6 years old. The average sex ratio and the child sex ratio are both higher than the same averages for Mizoram state.

Per the constitution of India and the Panchyati Raaj Act, Vanbawng is administrated by Village Council (Head of Village), who is the elected representative.

== Demographics ==
According to the 2011 census, the population in Vanbawng village is 1,231, comprising 220 households. Of the residents, 49% of the population (609 people) are males, and 51% (622 people) are females. All the residents are members of Scheduled Tribes. The population of Vanbawng strongly reflects the different communities of the ethnic Mizo people.

- Education

In 2011, Vanbawng had a literacy rate of 98.17%, while Mizoram state had an average literacy rate of 91.33%. In Vanbawng, the literacy rate for men was 97.88%, while the literacy rate for women was 98.45%.

- Caste

In Vanbawng village, 99.59% of the village population is from Schedule Tribe (ST). There is no population of Schedule Caste (SC) in Vanbawng village (Aizawl area).

- Work Profile

Out of the total population, 686 were engaged in work activities. 99.71% of workers describe their work as Main Work (Employment or Earning more than 6 Months) while 0.29% were involved in Marginal activity providing livelihood for less than 6 months. Of 686 workers engaged in Main Work, 640 were cultivators (owner or co-owner) while 1 was an Agricultural labourer.

== Administrative structure ==
Vanbawng is headed by the Village Council President. Almost all issues regarding the village administration are under this authority. The President and Village Council Members exercised all matters of village administration with regards to law and order and development projects. Some aid groups such like Young Mizo Association (YMA) and Mizo Hmeichhe Insuihkhawm Pawl (MHIP) play an important role in social issues, which may reduce the burdens of the village council members.

== Religion ==
Religion in Vanbawng
Religion	Percentage
Christianity	100%

All of the village residents identify as Christian (Protestant).

Presbyterian make up the majority of the population. However, Baptists, United Pentecostal Church and Seventh-day Adventists also live in the village.

== Geography ==
Vanbawng is located in north of the Manipur boarder of Mizoram. It is situated on a ridge 1,132 metres (3715 ft) above sea level, with the Tuivai river valley to its east and the Tuivawl river valley to its west.

== Climate ==
Vanbawng has a mild, sub-tropical climate due to its location and elevation. Under the Köppen climate classification, Vanbawng features a humid subtropical climate (Cwa). In summer, temperatures are moderately warm, averaging around 20–30 °C (68–86 °F). In winter, daytime temperatures are cooler in comparison to the rest of the year, averaging around 11–21 °C (52–70 °F). Rainfall is mostly concentrated between April and October, with the heaviest rainfall occurring in May, July, August and September. The remainder of the year is notably drier.

Climate data for Vanbawng (1981–2010, extremes 1973–2010)
Month	Jan	Feb	Mar	Apr	May	Jun	Jul	Aug	Sep	Oct	Nov	Dec	Year
Record high °C (°F)	29.5 (85.1)	33.8 (92.8)	34.6 (94.3)	35.5 (95.9)	34.2 (93.6)	33.6 (92.5)	33.2 (91.8)	32.2 (90.0)	32.7 (90.9)	33.1 (91.6)	32.8 (91.0)	28.5 (83.3)	35.5 (95.9)
Mean daily maximum °C (°F)	23.4 (74.1)	24.4 (75.9)	27.6 (81.7)	28.7 (83.7)	28.0 (82.4)	27.1 (80.8)	26.8 (80.2)	27.5 (81.5)	27.2 (81.0)	27.2 (81.0)	26.9 (80.4)	23.5 (74.3)	26.4 (79.5)
Mean daily minimum °C (°F)	11.7 (53.1)	13.3 (55.9)	16.5 (61.7)	17.7 (63.9)	19.1 (66.4)	19.9 (67.8)	20.0 (68.0)	20.4 (68.7)	19.9 (67.8)	19.1 (66.4)	16.2 (61.2)	12.9 (55.2)	17.2 (63.0)
Record low °C (°F)	6.1 (43.0)	7.3 (45.1)	9.6 (49.3)	11.7 (53.1)	12.2 (54.0)	15.2 (59.4)	12.0 (53.6)	16.2 (61.2)	16.7 (62.1)	13.5 (56.3)	10.0 (50.0)	8.0 (46.4)	6.1 (43.0)
Average rainfall mm (inches)	9.2 (0.36)	24.6 (0.97)	81.3 (3.20)	150.6 (5.93)	306.1 (12.05)	284.7 (11.21)	329.1 (12.96)	338.7 (13.33)	321.1 (12.64)	176.8 (6.96)	52.1 (2.05)	15.9 (0.63)	2,092 (82.36)
Average rainy days	0.7	2.1	4.3	8.2	13.6	17.0	18.7	19.0	14.9	9.5	2.7	0.9	111.4
Source: India Meteorological Department

Vanbawng

Climate chart (precipitation, max. and min. temperature)
J	F	M	A	M	J	J	A	S	O	N	D
13 20 11	23 22 13	73 25 16	168 27 18	289 26 18	406 26 19	320 25 19	321 26 19	305 26 19	184 25 18	43 23 15	15 21 12
- █ Average max. and min. temperatures in °C
- █ Precipitation totals in mm
- Source: WMO
Imperial conversion
J	F	M	A	M	J	J	A	S	O	N	D
0.5 69 53	0.9 71 55	2.9 77 60	6.6 80 64	11 79 65	16 78 66	13 78 66	13 78 66	12 78 67	7.2 76 64	1.7 73 59	0.6 70 54
- █ Average max. and min. temperatures in °F
- █ Precipitation totals in inches
