= North Lungpher =

- Village
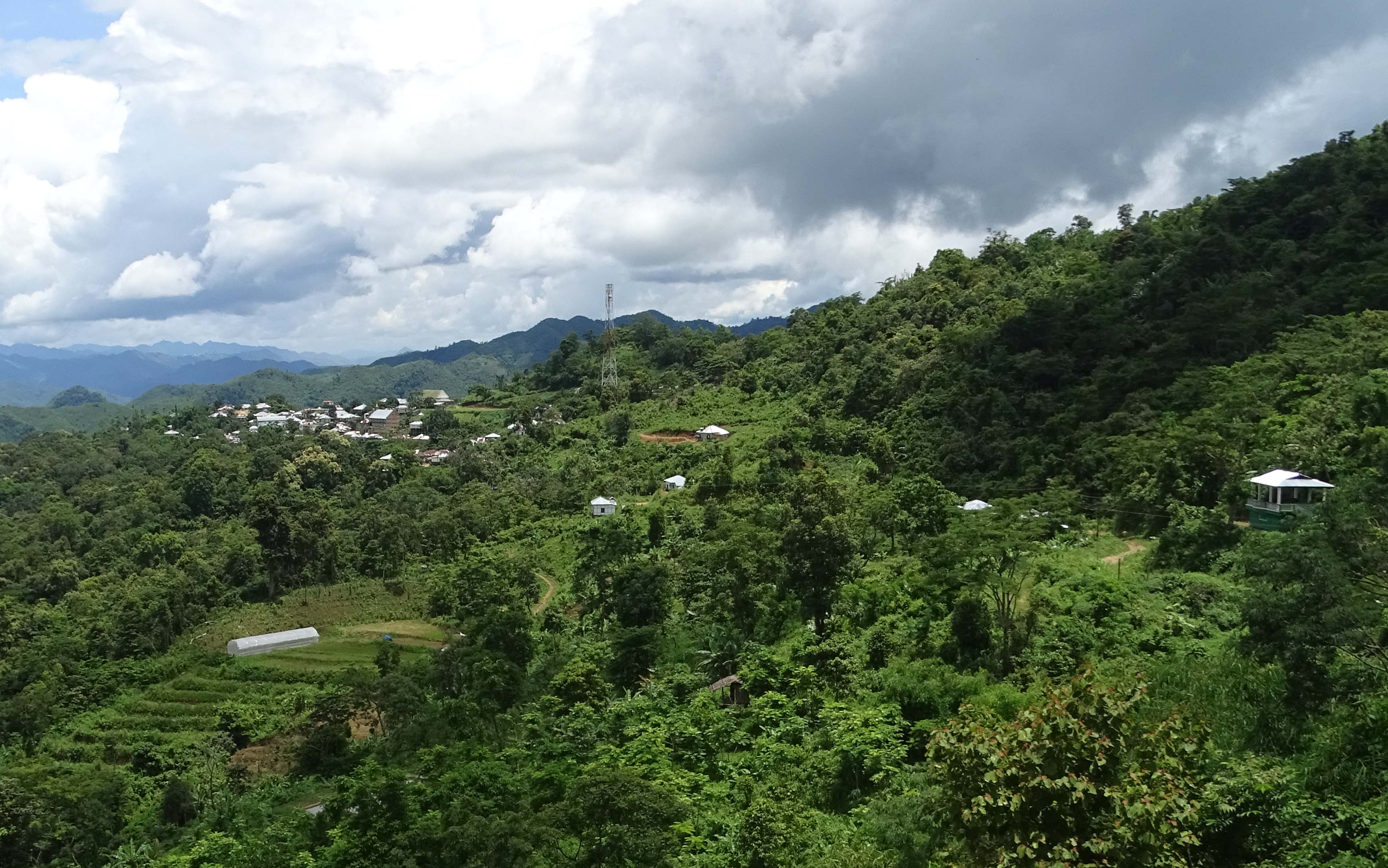
- A view of North Lungpher Village from the north
- Nicknames: Pherkhawpui, Pherkhawtualnuam
- Location in Mizoram, India North Lungpher (India)
- Coordinates: 23.7865°N 92.9745°E
- Country: India
- State: Mizoram
- District: Aizawl
- Founder: Lalzika

Area
  - Total: 356 km^{2} (137 sq mi)
- Elevation: 1,039 m (3,409 ft)

Population (2011)
  - Total: 899
  - Density: 8/km^{2} (21/sq mi)

Languages
  - Official: Mizo
- Time zone: UTC+5:30 (IST)
- PIN: 796261
- Vehicle registration: MZ 09
- Website: mizoram.nic.in

North Lungpher is a village situated in the state of Mizoram, India. It is a moderately-sized settlement located within the Thingsulthliah Rural Development Block of Saitual District, Mizoram, and is home to approximately 200 families.

== Population ==
As per the 2011 India Census, North Lungpher recorded a population of 899, with males comprising 57% and females 43%. Of the total population, 17.04% are children under the age of six. The village is situated in the Aizawl district of Mizoram.

Among the children aged 0 to 6 years, there are 146 individuals, constituting 17.04% of the village’s total population. The sex ratio in North Lungpher stands at 961 females for every 1,000 males, which is slightly lower than the state average of 976. The child sex ratio is 896, which is also below the Mizoram state average of 970.

The majority of the population in North Lungpher belongs to Scheduled Tribes (ST), accounting for 99.53% of the total population, while there are no individuals from the Scheduled Caste (SC) category.

North Lungpher boasts a literacy rate higher than the state average. In 2011, the village's literacy rate was 91.56%, compared to Mizoram’s overall rate of 91.33%. The male literacy rate was recorded at 90.28%, while the female literacy rate stood at an impressive 92.88%.

In accordance with the Constitution of India and the Panchayati Raj Act, North Lungpher is governed by a Sarpanch, the elected head of the village.

== Geography ==
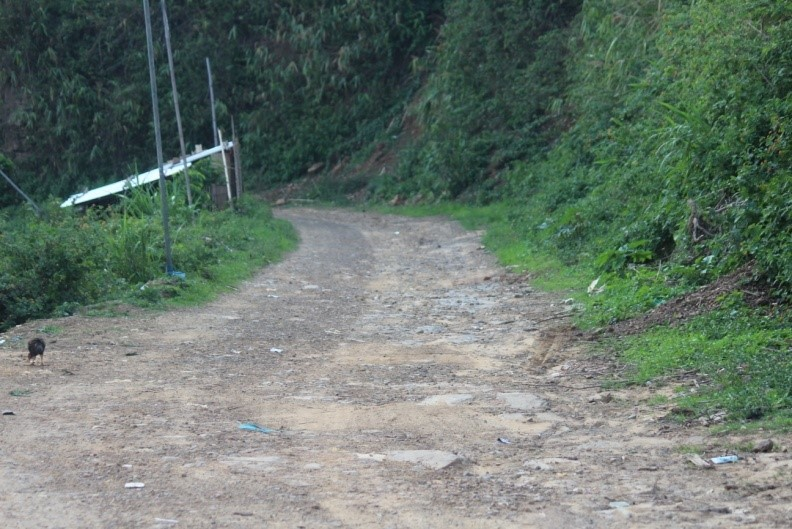
The only approach road to N.Lungpher Village

North Lungpher settlements are located between Chalfilh Tlang, the 6th highest mountain, and Mawmrang mountain range in Mizoram. It is located at an average elevation of 3,325 ft (1,013.5 m) above sea level. The geographical location of North Lungpher is between 23°47'21" - 23°47'01" N latitude and 92°58'22" - 92°58'43" E longitude. North Lungpher experiences a southwest monsoon in summer. The annual rainfall record at some places is 289 cm per year. The temperature of the village is neither too hot nor too cold. The village hardly exceeds 30 °C at summer and never fall below 5 °C during winter. All these above factors shaped the growth of vegetation and the village area is currently well vegetated.

=== Flora ===
More than 50% of the village area, now, is covered by thick forest, but the continuous practice of Jhumming, and non-agricultural land use like buildings, transportations like agricultural road and communication utilities etc. in the area led to a decline in the forest cover area. The region falls under the direct influence of southwest monsoon. As such, the region receives an adequate amount of rainfall. The climate is humid tropical, characterized by short winter, long summer with heavy rainfall. Currently, there are enough land resources for cultivation of different vegetables and cash crops. The village forest is an open access and is where the villagers go for their everyday needs like fodder and firewood etc. Although the village forest is an open access, but trading the forest products like timber, firewood and charcoal production are strictly prohibited. But are still open accesses for consumption. Some area of the land are protected by the villagers by planting useful species of trees like Ngiau (Michelia Champaca), Vang (Albizzia Stipulate), Khiang (Schima Wallichi) etc. Planting of trees is also done with the help of Village Forest Department Committee (VFDC) and Young Mizo Association (YMA). Vast areas of land are owned by individuals and are mainly used for cultivation. Current forest status shows decreases in forest cover due to the continuous practice of Shifting cultivation.

== History ==
North Lungpher was established in 1918 by King Lalzika of the Sailo dynasty, along with his companions. The settlers chose to separate from Buhban Village, located approximately 9 kilometers away, to form their own settlement. Today, North Lungpher has grown to surpass Buhban in population, becoming a more populous and thriving community.

== Economy ==
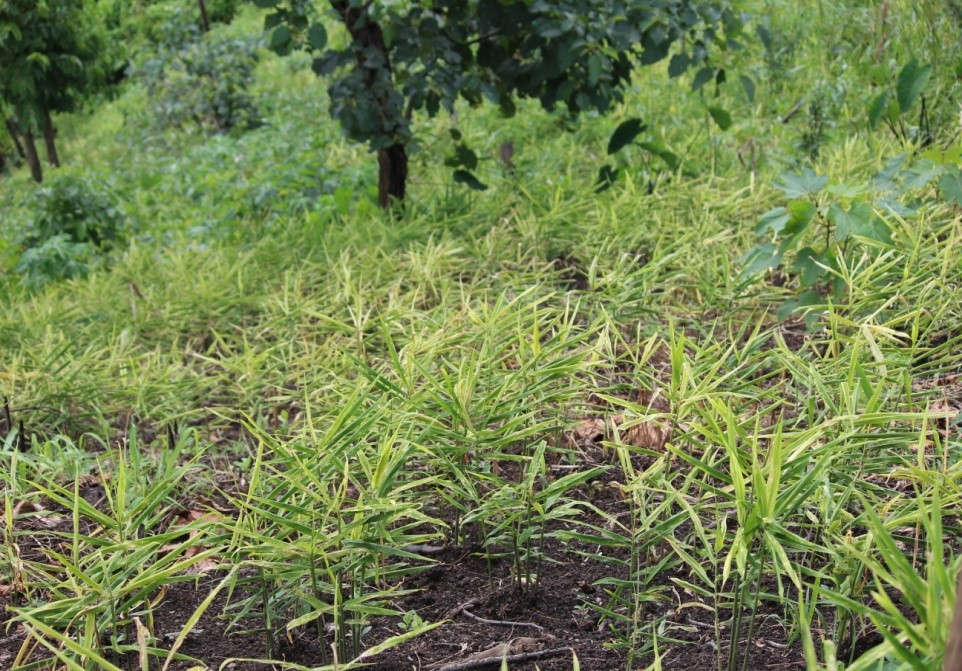
Ginger cultivation in North Lungpher

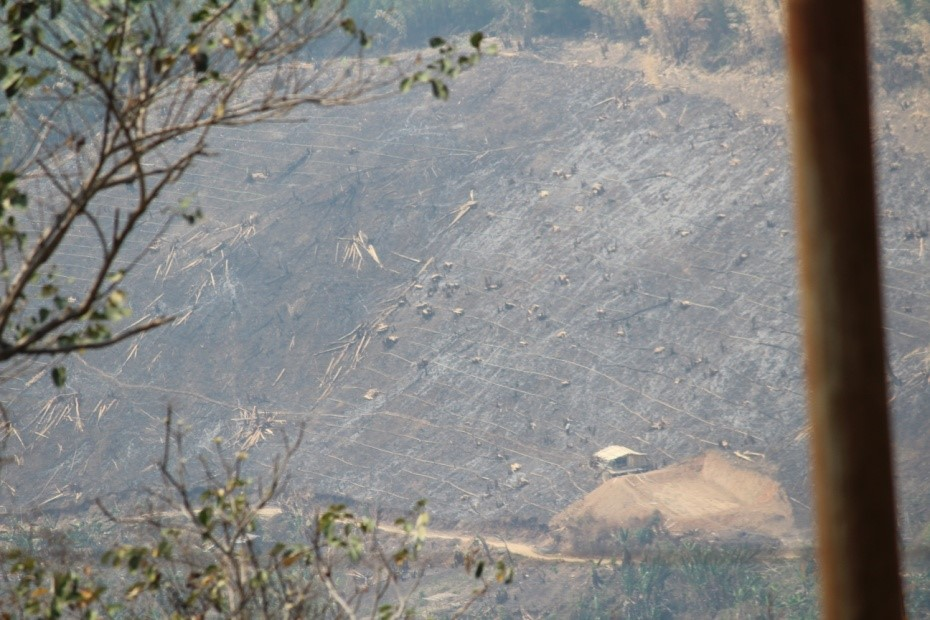
Agricultural land of N.Lungpher area after burning, locally named as KANGVAR

The majority of the people of N.Lungpher depend on Agriculture and horticulture for their livelihood. Apart from these, a small population including immigrants relying on livestock. The village approached road, which is the unmetalled road, is 15 km long from the metalled road of Saitual Town - Phullen village. Although agriculture has become the main source of income for the communities, most of the products are sold outside the village especially through Middleman. Marketing through middlemen has reduced the amount of money that could be earned by the primary producers from the export of vegetables and cash crops. Ginger is intensively grown by the farmers of N.Lungpher since the land in N.Lungpher village area is highly capable of growing such a crop in Kharif season. Nearly 90% of the total exported agricultural products from the village to the Market is Ginger. Since the village is located almost 100 km away from the nearest city, the farmers of N.Lungpher village did not have the opportunity to sell their products in a distant market, they need to go through middlemen in order to sell their products, but marketing through middlemen has reduced the amount of money that could be earned by the primary producers from the export of vegetables and cash crops. Rice/paddy, Bal, Maize, Brinjal and Samtawk are also the commonly cultivated vegetables and cash crops which are produced in a large quantity. The villagers can have a good deal of production without introducing fertilizers. But, as the population is increasing as well as household, there will be a growing pressure on land for cultivation. Therefore, it is imperative to introduce organic fertilizer in order to optimize the land use and increase in production.

== Religious composition ==
According to the 2011 Census, the religious composition of North Lungpher is entirely Christian, with 100% of the population adhering to Christianity. The village is home to three churches representing different denominations: UPC N.E.I., UPC Mizoram, and the Presbyterian. Among these, the Presbyterian Church of India has the largest congregation, comprising 55% of the total population. UPC N.E.I. follows with 35%, while UPC Mizoram accounts for 10% of the community.

== Education ==
=== Government Primary school ===
The primary school in North Lungpher has been under the administration of the Government of Mizoram since 1946. The school has successfully implemented various activities under the SSA. Currently, the school enrolls approximately 55 students, and the headmaster is Pu K.Lalthanpuia

=== Government Middle school ===
The Government Middle School of North Lungpher is currently administered by the Government of Mizoram. Established in 1974, the school presently enrolls 52 students. Following the transfer of the school's headmasters to other institutions, no new headmaster has been appointed. Consequently, one of the teachers, Mrs. Nl. Lalramngaihzuali Ralte, has been temporarily appointed as the acting headmaster.

=== High school ===
A private high school was established in 1990 by the Village Council in collaboration with various NGOs, recognizing the socio-economic benefits it could bring to the local community. Currently, the school has an enrollment of approximately 25 students. The school is under the leadership of Pu Lalhlupuia Zote.

=== Centenary English Medium School ===
Centenary English Medium School (CEMS), like many other English-medium institutions in the region, is a co-educational private school located in Venglai, North Lungpher. Founded in March 2017 by Lalchharliana, the school was established in response to the growing demand from the local community for English as the medium of instruction. The school currently offers primary education, including Nursery, Kindergarten, and Classes I, II, and III, with plans to expand to higher grades in the coming years. In the 2017-2018 academic session, the school had an enrollment of 43 students. The principal of the school is Lalchuailova.

== Media ==
=== Newspapers ===
Mizoram's popular daily newspapers Vanglaini and Aizawl Post reach the village mainly at the evening. Nearly 15 families are subscribed to the biggest newspaper in Mizoram.

==== Local newspaper ====
Name of newspaper	Frequency	Name of editor	Estd.	No. of subscribers	Present Status
Zothlifim	Weekly	Rowland Vanllalawia	2005	90	Discontinued
KTP AW	Weekly	Lalhruaitluanga	1994-2002, 2009-	129	Discontinued
RABBONI	Weekly	VL Roluahpuia	2012-	90	Active
CHUAILOPAR	Weekly	Ronson Laltanpuia	2015-	184	Active

=== Cable television ===
Name of cable TV	Name of owner	Estd.	No. of channels	Main channel	No. of subscribers
RONSON CABLE NETWORK	LALCHHARLIANA	2009	175	RCN	170

== Civil administration ==
North Lungpher is home to a Village Council Court, which was established in 1954, 36 years after the village itself was founded. The current President of the Village Council is Pu Krosthanga. The Young Mizo Association (YMA) also has a branch in the village, which was formed in 1948. The present President of YMA is Pu K. Lalchhanhima. The Mizo Hmeichhe Insuihkhawm Pawl (MHIP), the largest women's NGO in the region, was founded in 1977, 29 years after the establishment of the YMA branch. The current President of MHIP is Pi Lalrinchhuangi. Among the prominent NGOs, the Mizoram Upa Pawl (MUP) has also played a significant role in the village since its establishment in 1985.

== Notable people ==
- Lalkima Zote, one of the top artists in the 1980s
- Lalrinnunga Ralte, 2nd Runner Up, LPS COMEDIAN SEARCH,Season 12
- Pastor Chhuahkhama, the first Christian Pastor among Mizos
