= Phullen =

Phullen Khandaih khua
- Location within Mizoram Location within India
- Country: India
- State: Mizoram
- District: Saitual district
- Established: 1901
- Founder: Vanphunga Sailo
- Seat: Phullen RD Block Headquarters

Government
  - Body: Village Council of Phullen
- Elevation: 1,045 m (3,428 ft)
- Postal code: 796261

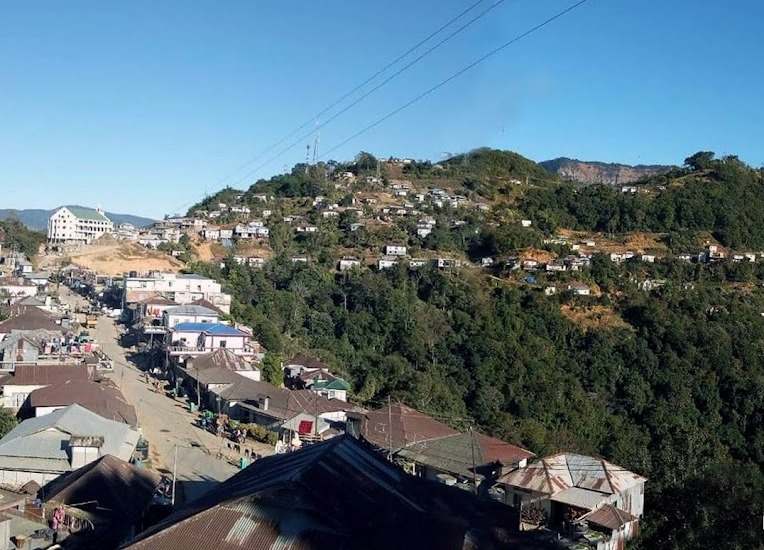
Phullen from west

Phullen is a town in Saitual district, in the Indian state of Mizoram. As per the Constitution of India and Panchayati Raj Act, Phullen is administrated by a Village Council who are the elected representatives of the village. It is located 125 kilometres (78 mi) east of the State Capital Aizawl, which is also the capital of Mizoram. Phullen is a Block headquarters of Phullen Block, which is bounded by Darlawn Block towards west, Ngopa Block towards East, Thingsulthliah Block

== Culture ==
The population of Phullen is made up of different ethnic groups. The culture of the Mizo tribes and its social structure has changed since the arrival of Christianity in Mizoram. People of Phullen celebrate Christmas festival, New Year, Chapchar Kut

== Administrative structure ==
Phullen is headed by the Village Council President. Almost all issues regarding the village administration are under this authority. The President and Village Council Members exercised all matters of village administration with regards to law and order and development projects. Some aid groups such like Young Mizo Association (YMA) and Mizo Hmeichhe Insuihkhawm Pawl

== Gallery ==
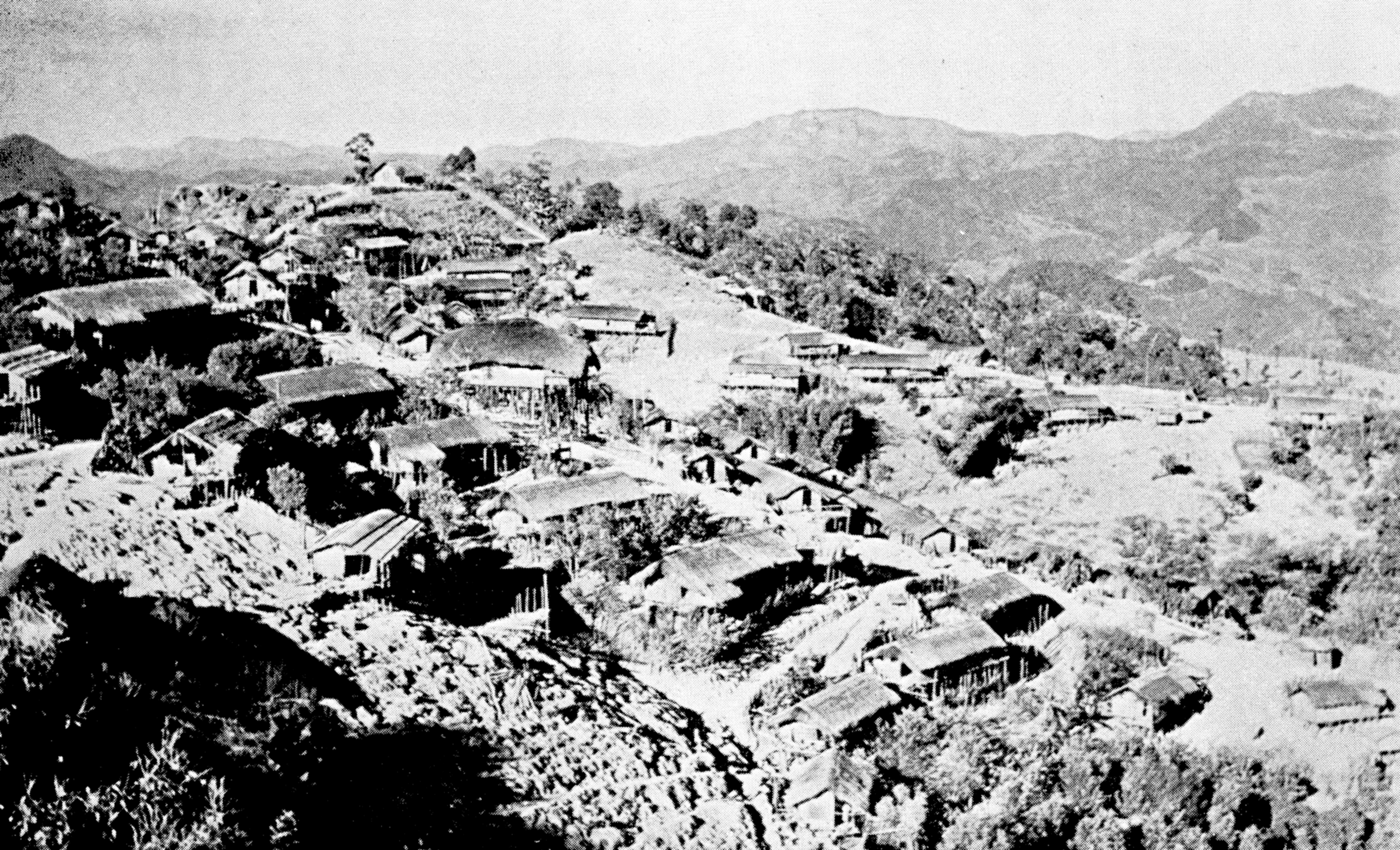
Aerial View of Phullen in 1940s

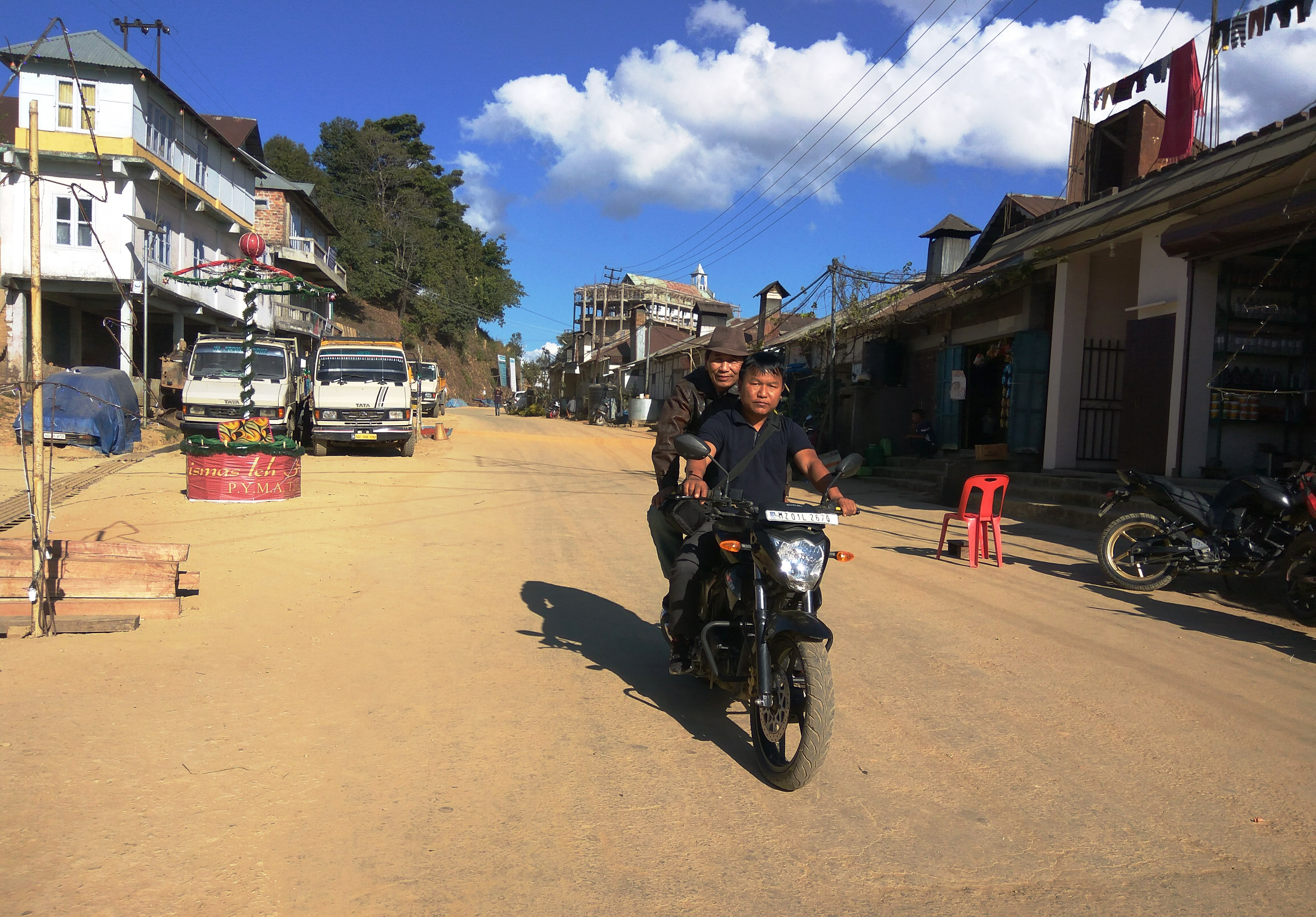
Phullen Diakkawn

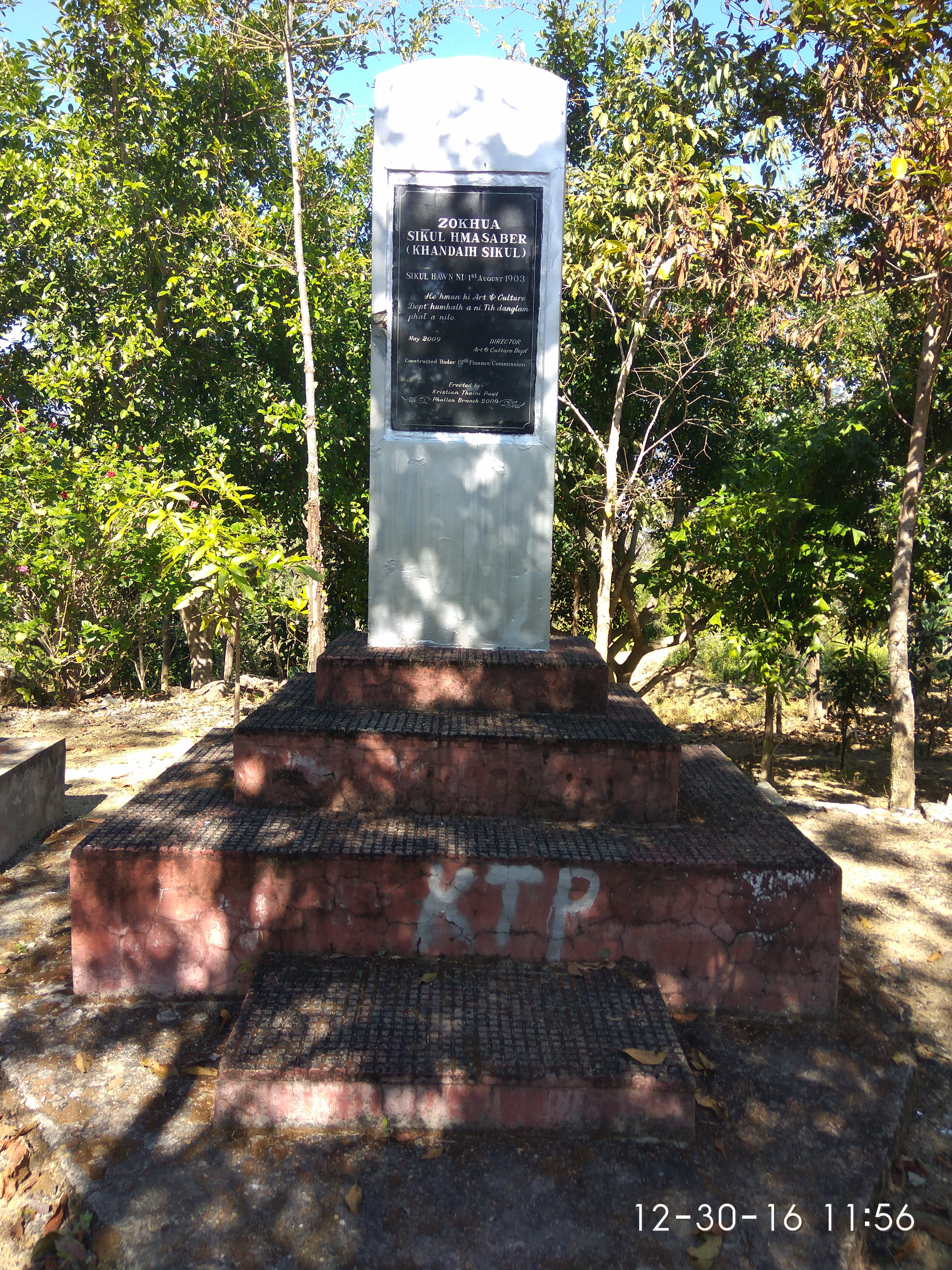
Khandaih: The first permanent school in rural Mizoram was established on 1 August 1903 at Khandaih

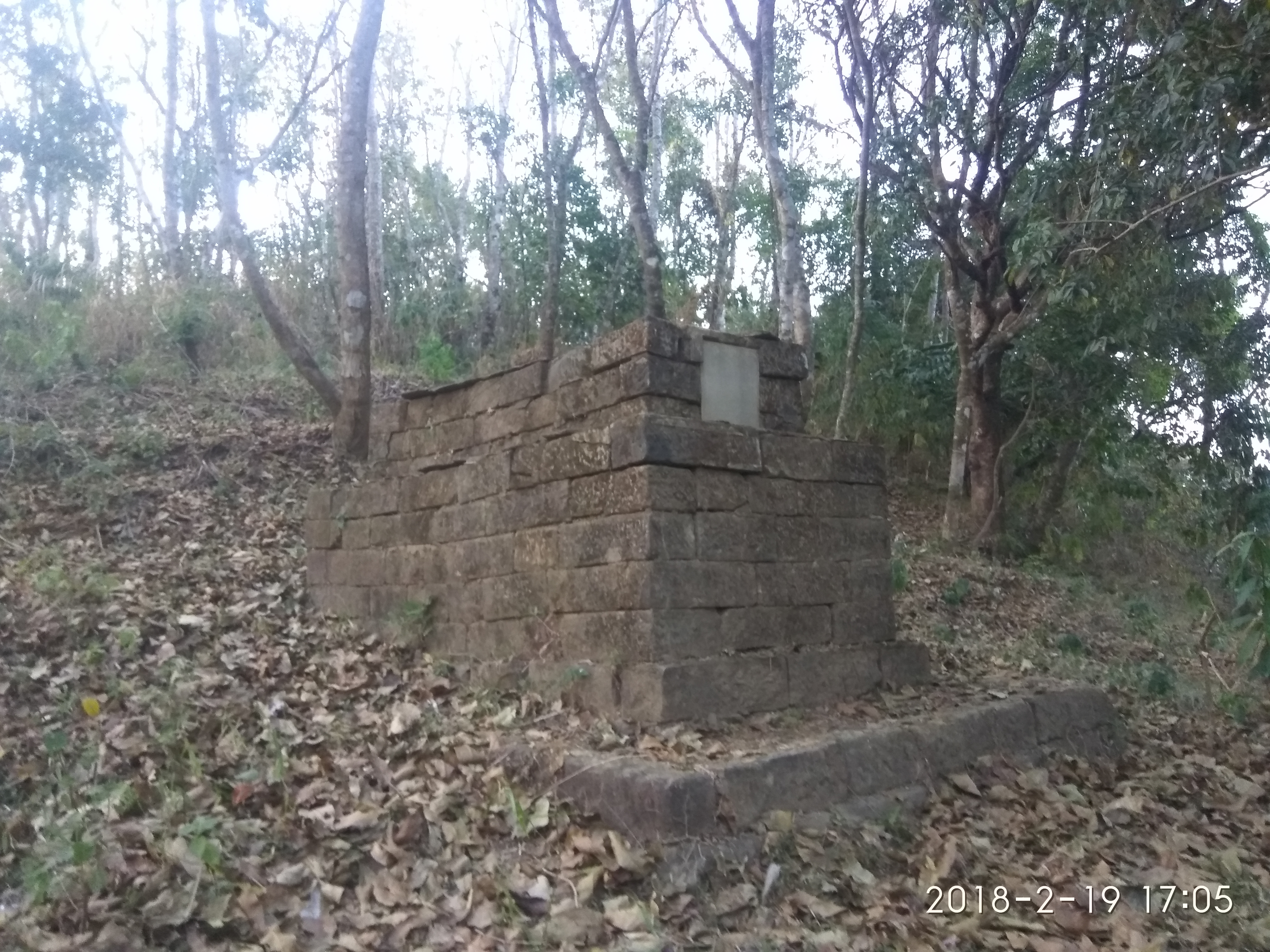
Awksarala's Tomb: Awksarala's Tomb is the tomb of the Phullen Chief Awksarala, located at Lalhuan Tlang in Phullen, Aizawl District, Mizoram, India.

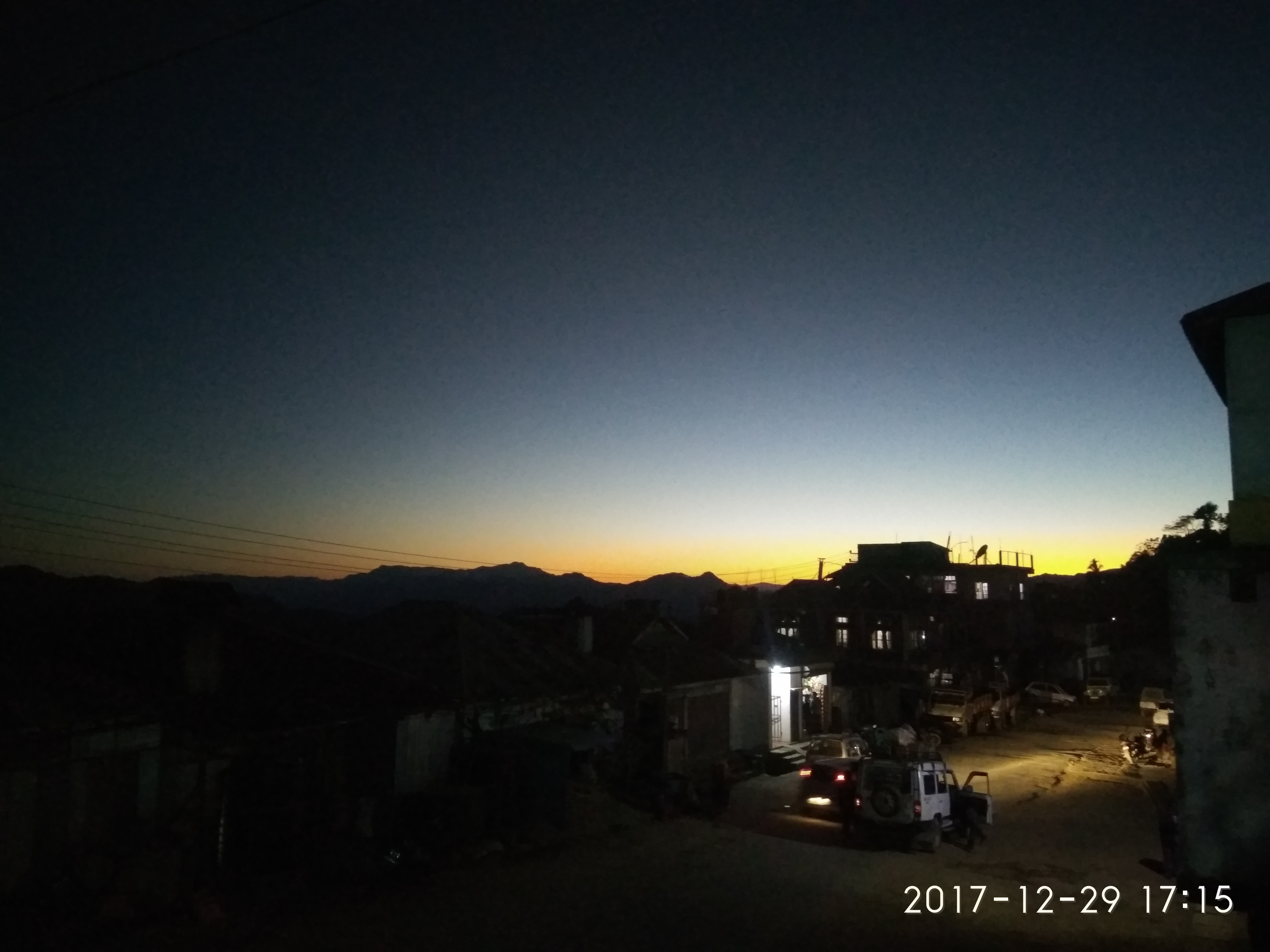
Beautiful Evening at Phullen.

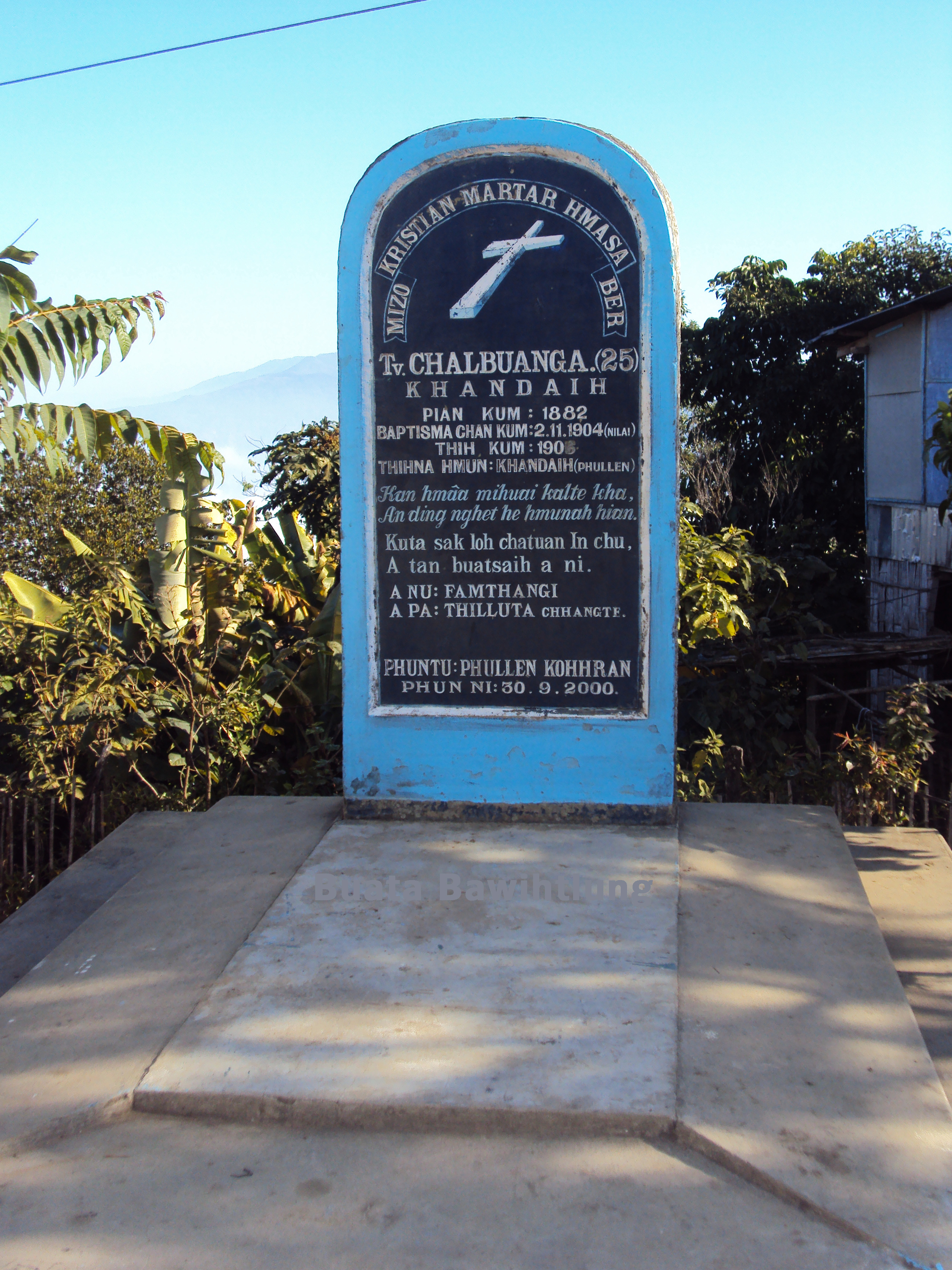
First Mizo Christian Martyr

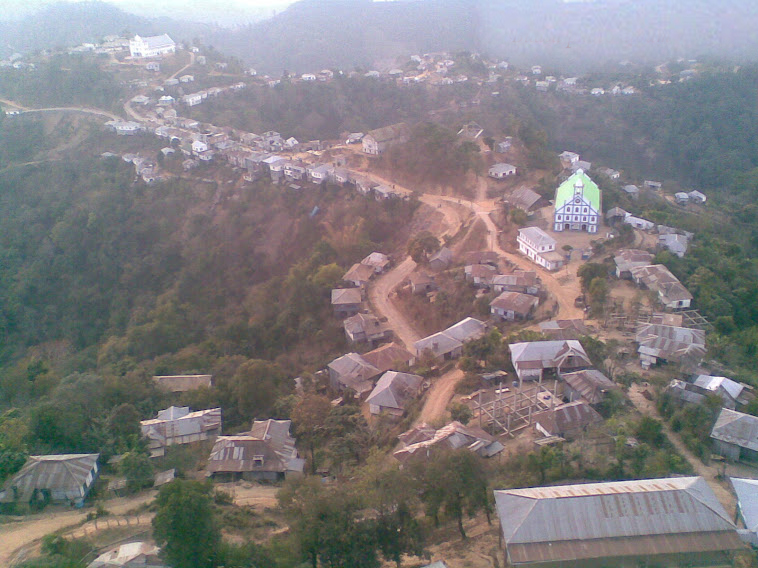
Phullen is a town in Aizawl district, in the Indian state of Mizoram. It is 125 kilometers away from the state capital in the north eastern part of Mizoram.

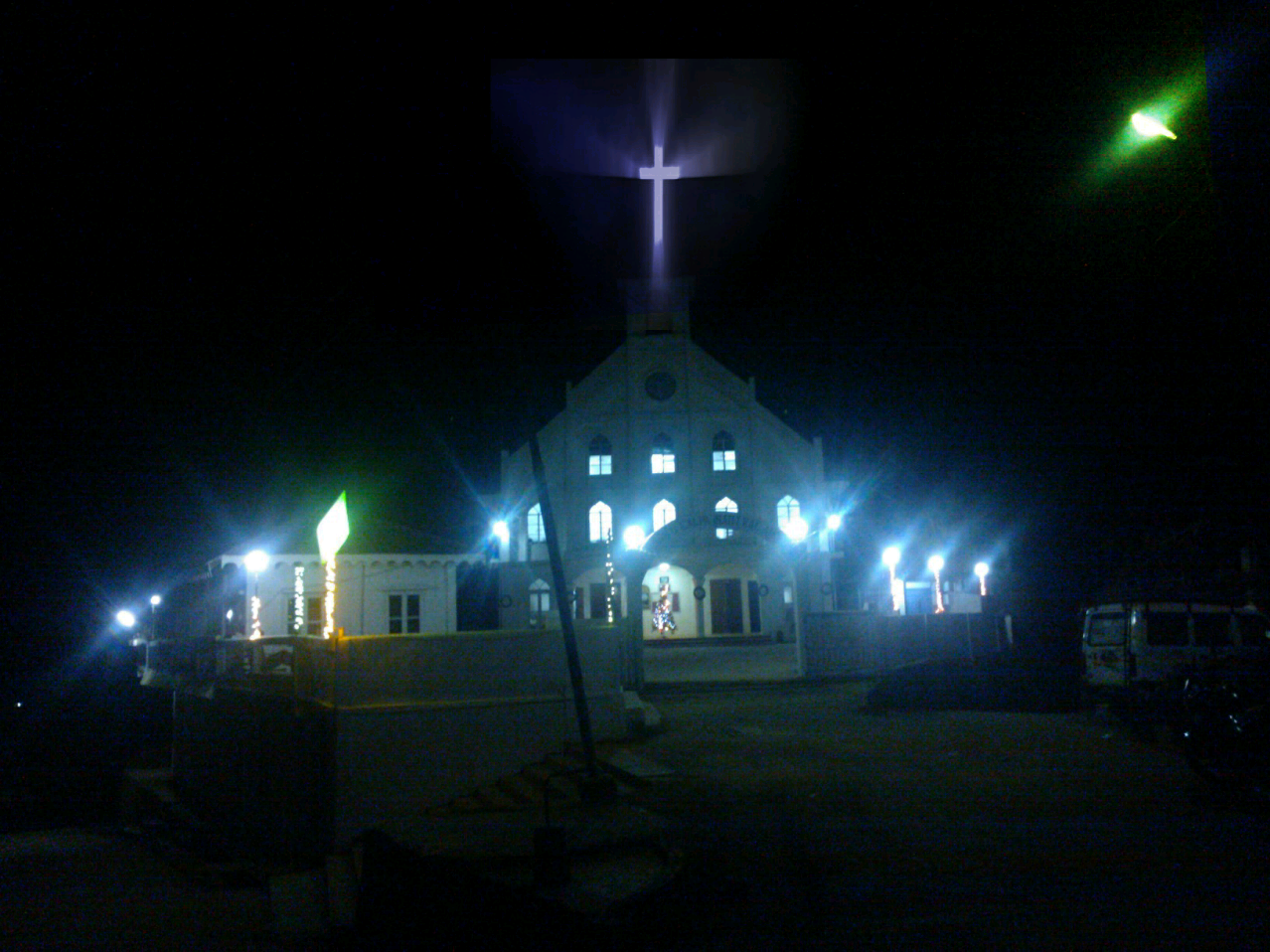
Phullen Presbyterian Church - it was established in 1901 at Khandaih.

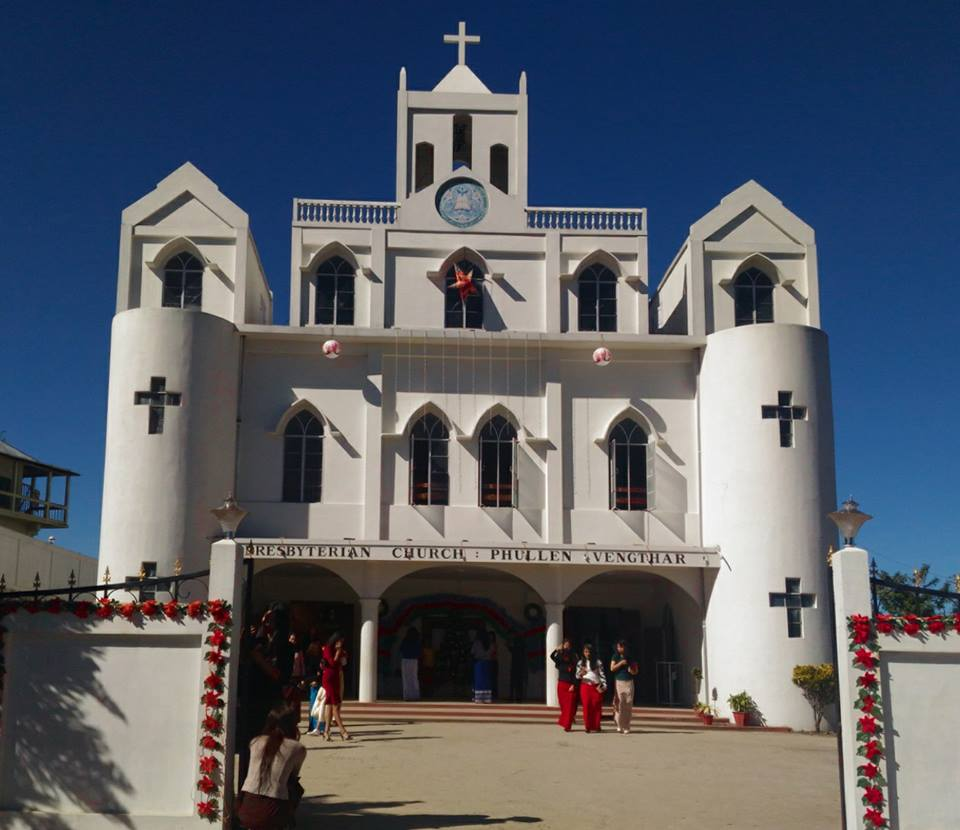
Phullen Vengthar Presbyterian was established in 1980

== See also ==
North Lungpher
