= Daido, Mizoram =

Village in Mizoram, India

Daido Daido
- Village
- Location in Mizoram, India Daido (India)
- Coordinates: 24°2′48″N 93°8′48″E
- Country: India
- State: Mizoram
- District: Saitual
- Block: Phullen

Government
  - Body: Village Council

Population (2011)
  - Total: 603

Languages
  - Official: Mizo, English
- Time zone: UTC+5:30 (IST)
- PIN: 796261
- Telephone code: 0389
- Vehicle registration: MZ
- Nearest town: Saitual / Phullen

Daido is a village in the Saitual district in Mizoram, India.It is situated in the Phullen RD block area of the district. Saitual is the nearest town to Daido. According to 2011 Census, the village had a population of 603 people living in 93 households, 301 are males and 302 are females. Daido is one of the constituent villages of the Sinlung Hills Council and falls under the Khawlian constituency. 796261 is the Zip Code or Postal Code of Daido village.

== Daido village council members (2025-2030) ==
Daido village council members (2025-2030)
| Position | Name |
|---|---|
| President | Lalrintluanga |
| Vice President | Ngurthnamawii |
| Secretary | Singromawia |
| Treasurer | Lianthangchhunga |

== See also ==
- Aizawl
- Saitual
- Aizawl district

Daido is a village in Aizawl district, Mizoram, India.
