= Lamherh =

Village in Mizoram, India

- Village
- Location in Mizoram, India Lamherh (India)
- Coordinates: 24.0077°N 93.0357°E
- Country: India
- State: Mizoram
- District: Aizawl
- Block: Phullen

Population (2011)
  - Total: 598

Languages
  - Official: Mizo
- Time zone: UTC+5:30 (IST)
- PIN: 796161

Lamherh is a village in the Phullen Community Development Block in the Aizawl district, Mizoram, India and the nearest town is Aizawl, located about 50 km away.

According to the 2011 Census, Lamherh had a population of 598 people living in 113 households, with a literacy rate of 94.12%. Lamherh has the postal PIN code 796261. Lamherh is one of the constituent villages of the Sinlung Hills Council and falls under the Vanbawng constituency.

== See also ==
- Aizawl
- Aizawl district
