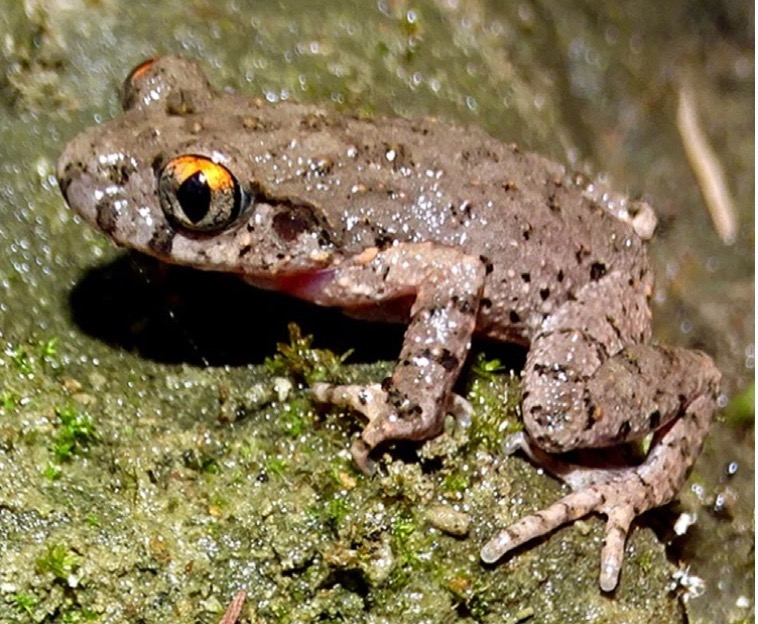
- Male from Dampa Tiger Reserve, Mizoram, India

Conservation status
- Data Deficient (IUCN 3.1)

Scientific classification
- Kingdom: Animalia
- Phylum: Chordata
- Class: Amphibia
- Order: Anura
- Family: Megophryidae
- Genus: Leptobrachella
- Species: L. tamdil

Binomial name
- Leptobrachella tamdil Sengupta, Sailo, Lalremsanga, Das, and Das, 2010

Synonyms
- Leptolalax tamdil Sengupta et al., 2010

= Leptobrachella tamdil =

Species of amphibian

Leptobrachella tamdil (Ṭam Dil leaf litter frog) is an anuran amphibian belonging to the family Megophryidae. Discovered from Ṭam Dil, an eponymous lake in Mizoram, it is found only in northeast India. Originally identified as a species of Leptolalax in 2010, it was reassigned to the genus Leptobrachella in 2020. It is a small frog, but medium-sized among Leptobrachella species; the male measuring 32.3 mm, and female 31.8 mm. The species is diagnosed with unique features such as eyelids with tubercles, distinct tympanum and supratympanic folds, undilated toe tips with dermal fringes, long hind limbs, and distinct color patches.

== Discovery and identification ==
Ṭam Dil is a natural reservoir lake situated 6 km from Saitual, the nearest town, and 110 km from Aizawl, the capital city of Mizoram, India. It is made into a fish rearing site by the Fisheries Department of the Government of Mizoram, it is maintained as a holiday resort by the Tourism Department. Faunal explorations started in the early 2000s.

The original specimens collected in 2007 included male and female adult frogs and were classified as a type of Asian slender litter frogs (genus Leptolalax). However, additional specimens collected in 2020 from Dampa Tiger Reserve at western Mizoram, indicated that the species belongs to the genus Leptobrachella. It was renamed as Ṭam Dil leaf litter frog, Leptobrachella tamdil. Other specimens were also discovered in Chakpi Stream, Chandel District, Manipur (a neighbouring state of Mizoram) in 2021. Genetic analysis further confirmed the species identity.

== Description ==
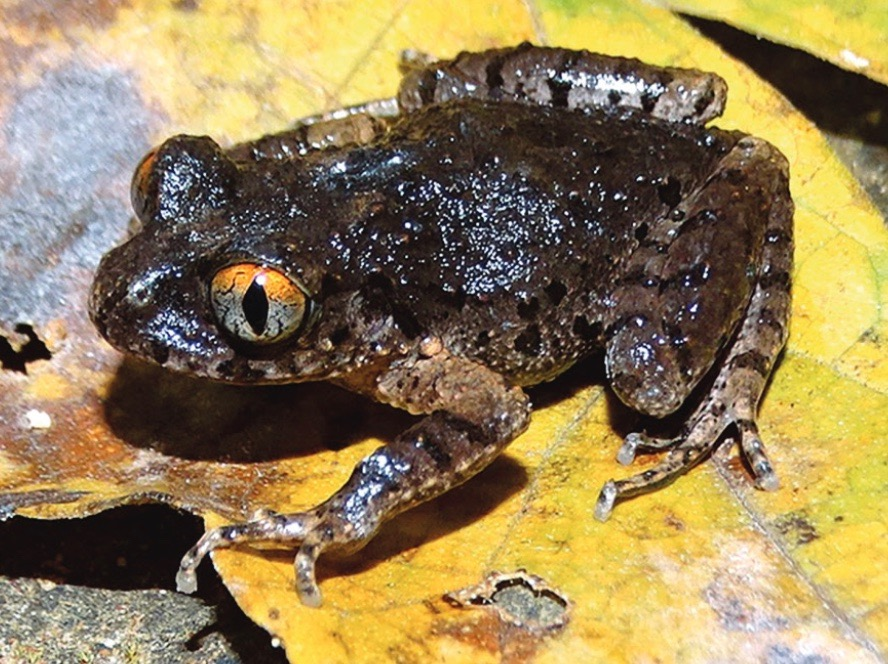
Leptobrachella tamdil (female) from Manipur, India

Like other species of Leptobrachella, L. tamdil is a small frog and difficult to notice since the body is well camouflaged with the surrounding environment. Leptobrachella frogs are distinct from other frogs from their vermiform or eel-like appearance, and lack web between their toes, which are comparatively long slender. Hence, they are commonly called slender-armed frogs, or dwarf litter frogs. Adult males L. tamdil are 32.3 mm long, and females, 31.8 mm. The presence of ventrolateral glands in the foregut and femoral glands in thighs of the males set the species apart from other members of the genus. In addition, the larger head (compared to body size), smooth eye lids (tiny protrusions called tubercles are common in other species), and absence of lateral fringes on the toes are the identifying features. A female can produce about 105 eggs at a time.

The body is dull-grey in colour with patches of dark-grey spots and stripes. The eyes are light grey but with bright orange iris pigmentation on the upper-half of the eye. The pupil is vertically ellipsoid with black colour. The fingers and toes are lined with faint dark transverse stripes, and the tips are whitish and almost transparent.
