= New Vervek =

Village in Mizoram, India

New Vervek N. Vervek / New Verkvek
- Village
- Location in Mizoram, India New Vervek (India)
- Coordinates: 24°11′8″N 92°56′44″E
- Country: India
- State: Mizoram
- District: Aizawl
- Block: Darlawn

Government
  - Body: Village Council

Population (2011)
  - Total: 729

Languages
  - Official: Mizo, English
- Time zone: UTC+05:30 (IST)
- PIN: 796111
- Vehicle registration: MZ
- Nearest town: Darlawn
- Lok Sabha constituency: Mizoram
- Vidhan Sabha constituency: Darlawn

New Vervek is a village in the Darlawn Community Development Block in the Aizawl district, Mizoram, India. According to the 2011 Census, New Vervek had a population of 729 people living in 150 households, with a literacy rate of 92.89 %. New Vervek has the postal PIN code 796111. New Vervek is one of the constituent villages of the Sinlung Hills Council and falls under the New Vervek constituency.

== New Vervek village council members (2025-2030) ==
New Vervek village council members (2025-2030)
Position	Name
President	Zodinpuia
Vice President	Lalramchhana
Secretary	HB Zothansanga
Treasurer	H. Lalremruata
Member	Lalchhantluangi
Member	Lalzarzova

== See also ==
- Aizawl
- Aizawl district
