= Sangkhumi Bualchhuak =

Indian activist

- Born: 1948 (age 77–78); Mizoram, India
- Occupation: Activist
- Known for: Women empowerment in Mizoram
- Spouse: Ramhluna Khiangte
- Awards: Padma Shri

Sangkhumi Bualchhuak is a social activist known for the cause of women empowerment in Mizoram.

== Activism ==
B. Sangkhumi was President of Mizo Hmeichhe Insuihkhawm Pawl (MHIP), an apex body representing several local women's groups in Mizoram had been instrumental in the passing of The Mizo Marriage Bill 2013, The Mizo Inheritance Bill, 2013, and The Mizo Divorce Bill, 2013.

== Career ==
B. Sangkhumi is a former public servant who has worked as Director, Higher & Technical Education in the Government of Mizoram member and Chairman of Mizoram Public Service Commission (MPSC). Upon retirement she went on to lead Mizo Hmeichhe Insuihkhawm Pawl (MHIP). She has also unsuccessfully contested Champhai South MLA Constituency in 2013.

== Awards ==
B. Sangkhumi was conferred with Padma Shree Award in 2021.
