= Chhawrtui =

- village
- Location in Mizoram, India Chhawrtui (India)
- Coordinates: 23.5003442°N 93.0695158°E
- Country: India
- State: Mizoram
- District: Champhai
- Block: Khawzawl
- Elevation: 1,175 m (3,855 ft)

Population (2011)
  - Total: 1,011
- Time zone: UTC+5:30 (IST)
- 2011 census code: 271320

Chhawrtui is a village in the Khawzawl district of Mizoram, India. It is located in the Khawzawl R.D. Block. The Tuivawl river rises near the Chhawrtui village.

== Demographics ==
According to the 2011 census of India, Chhawrtui has 194 households. The effective literacy rate (i.e. the literacy rate of population excluding children aged 6 and below) is 95.46%.

Demographics (2011 Census)
	Total	Male	Female
Population	1011	524	487
Children aged below 6 years	152	77	75
Scheduled caste	0	0	0
Scheduled tribe	1007	521	486
Literates	820	435	385
Workers (all)	554	305	249
Main workers (total)	552	303	249
Main workers: Cultivators	497	258	239
Main workers: Agricultural labourers	0	0	0
Main workers: Household industry workers	2	2	0
Main workers: Other	53	43	10
Marginal workers (total)	2	2	0
Marginal workers: Cultivators	0	0	0
Marginal workers: Agricultural labourers	1	1	0
Marginal workers: Household industry workers	0	0	0
Marginal workers: Others	1	1	0
Non-workers	457	219	238
