= Tam Dil =

Lake in India

- Tamdil
- Location within Mizoram Location within India

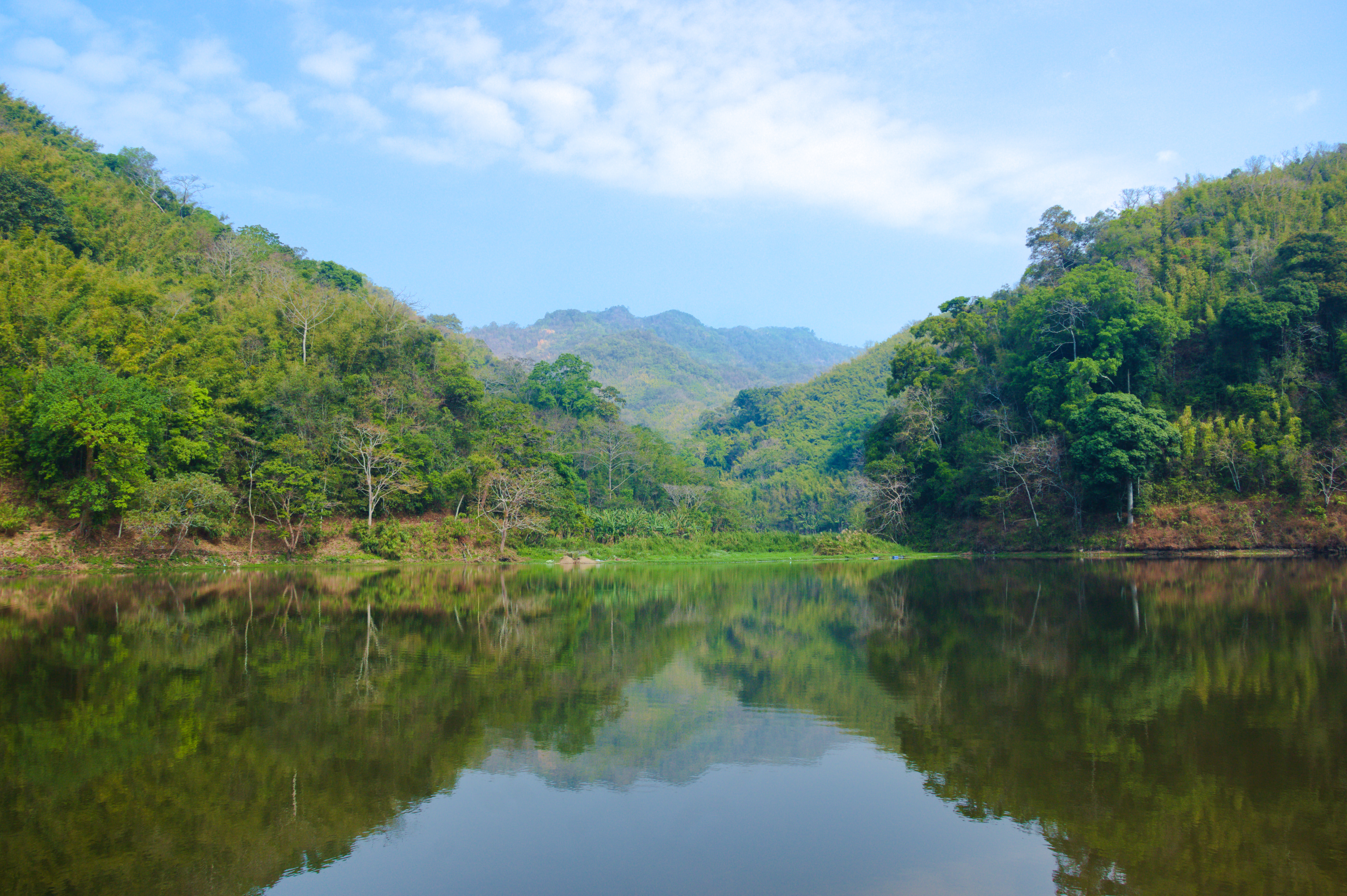
- Tam Dil Lake in 2026
- Location: Mizoram
- Coordinates: 23°44′20″N 92°57′10″E
- Basin countries: India
- Max. length: 20 kilometres (66,000 ft)
- Settlements: Saitual

Ṭam Dil is a reservoir lake situated 6 km from Saitual, the nearest town, and 110 km from Aizawl, the capital city of Mizoram, India. Acquired by the Fisheries Department of the Government of Mizoram, it is maintained as a fish rearing site. Also as a tourist attraction, a holiday resort is maintained by the Tourism Department.

The natural lake has attracted biodiversity researchers and contains several unique and rare species, particularly of amphibians and snakes. A unique frog, Leptobrachella tamdil was discovered in 2010. A novel species of snake, Smithophis mizoramensis was reported in 2024.

== Name ==
In Mizo language, the word Ṭam is a contraction of anṭam, which means a mustard plant; and Dil means "lake".

=== Origin and etymology ===
The origin and etymology of Ṭam Dil are shrouded in myth. Folklore has it that a married couple had a jhum plot in this small valley surrounded by small steep hills. The man unfortunately died leaving the wife to care for the crops alone. In the middle of the field was a robust mustard plant, conspicuously bigger than any other plants. One night the widow has a visitation by her husband, who informed her to take special care of the giant mustard plant as it was a harbinger of immense blessing. On the wake, she did as told, and the plant thrived very well.

As time went, the widow remarried but the new husband objected to any thing reminiscence of the deceased husband, and so he plucked the plant up by the roots and discarded it. The vast hole left in the ground was then soon filled by water (seeping from the plant, according to some versions; from the ground itself, in another version) to become an exquisite lake. Hence the name of Ṭam Dil, for the "lake of the mustard".

== Fauna ==
Biodiversity scientists started faunal exploration in the early 2000s. A new species of frog called Ṭam Dil leaf litter frog (Leptobrachella tamdil, originally named Leptolalax tamdil) was discovered in 2007 from this lake and described in 2010. A rare species of Assam Kukri snake, Oligodon catenatus was discovered in 2020. In 2024, a new species of snake, Smithophis mizoramensis was discovered.

== Tourism ==
The lake is reconstructed as part of building a fishing reservoir by the Fisheries Department, Government of Mizoram. In an attempt to promote and develop the destination, lake-side resorts are maintained by the Tourism Department in partnership with ZX Eden offering boating, kayaking and other adventure activities for kids and adults.

== Gallery ==
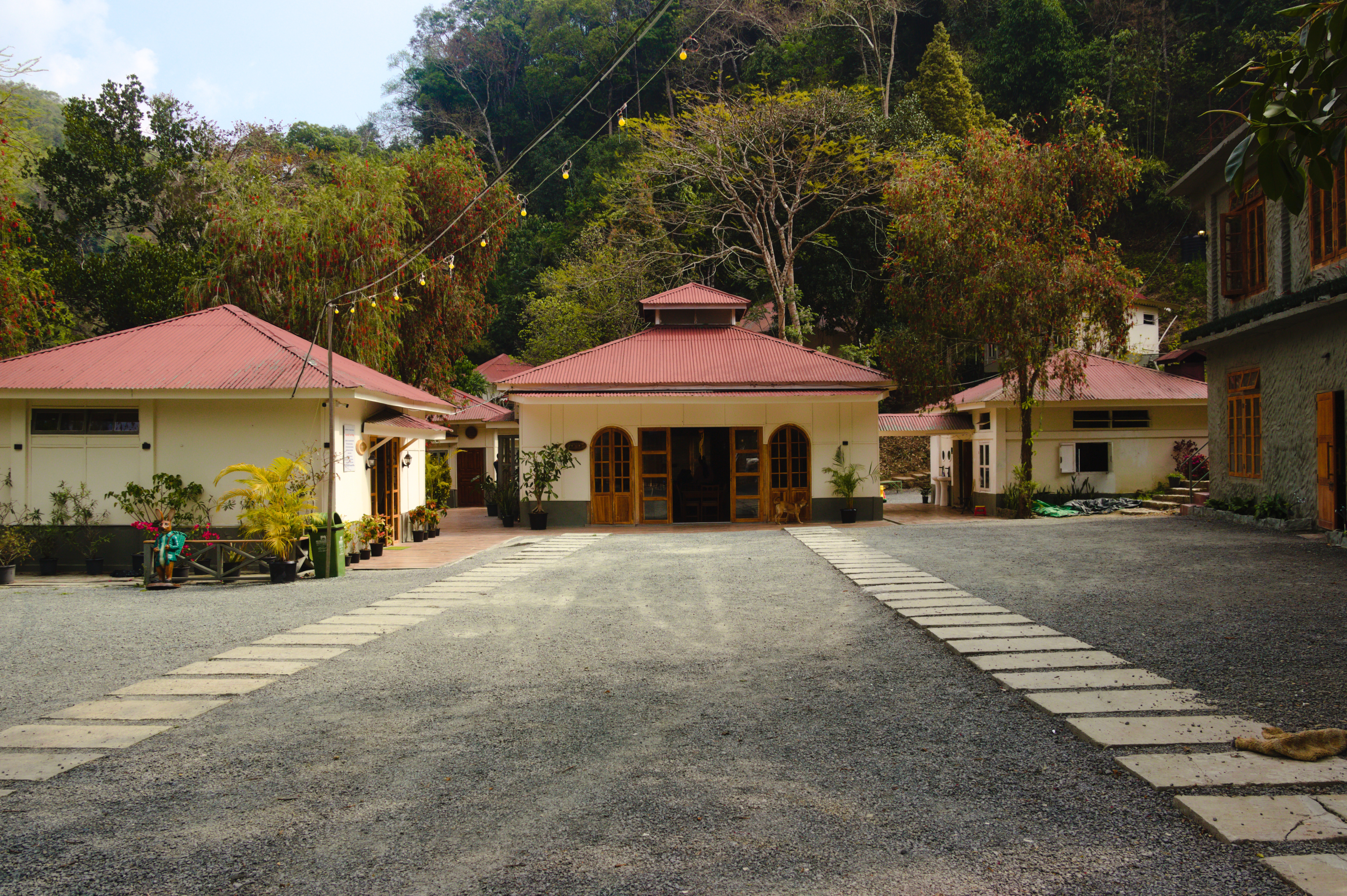
ZX Eden Resort

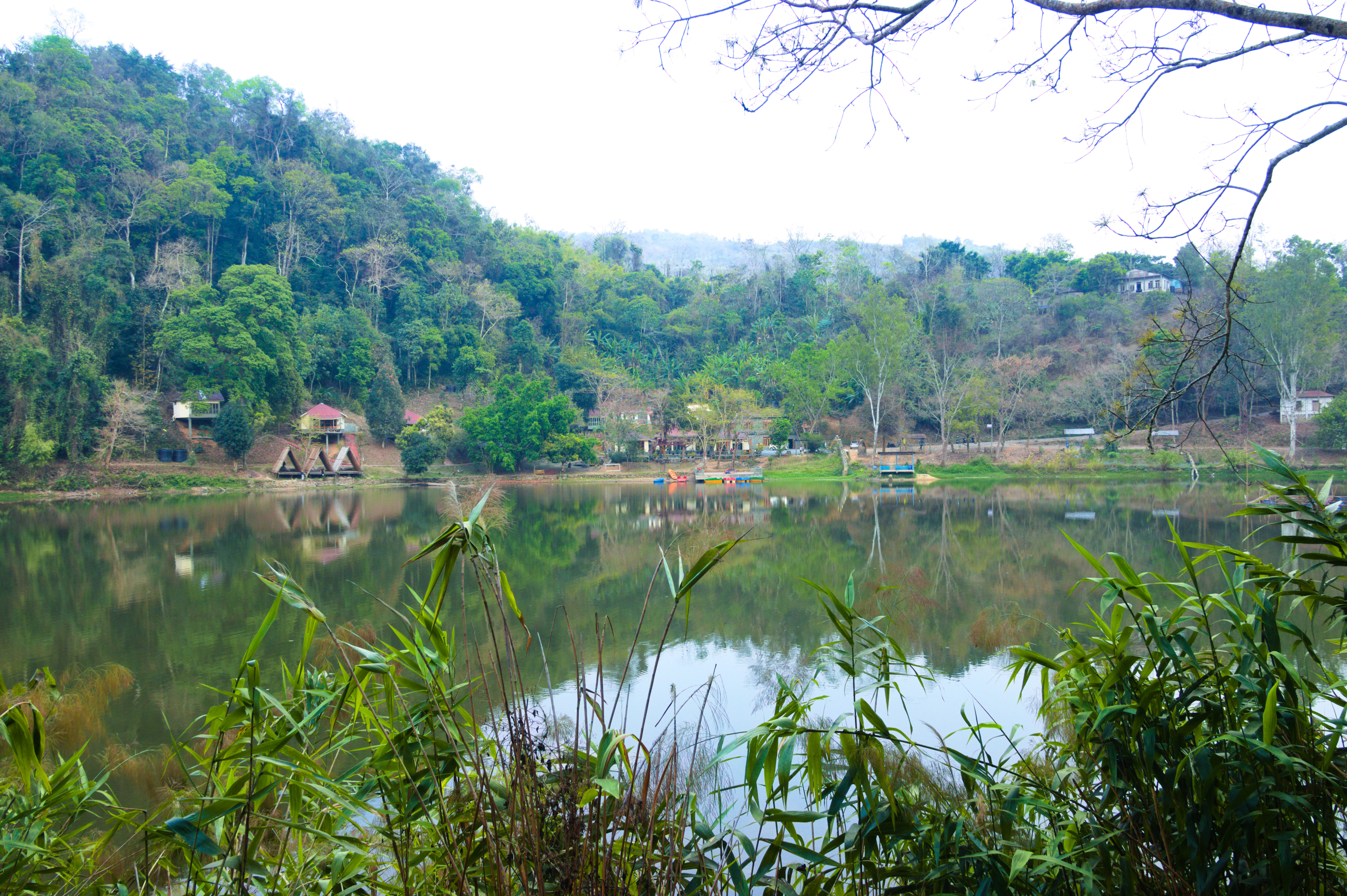
Whole View of the lake and the resort

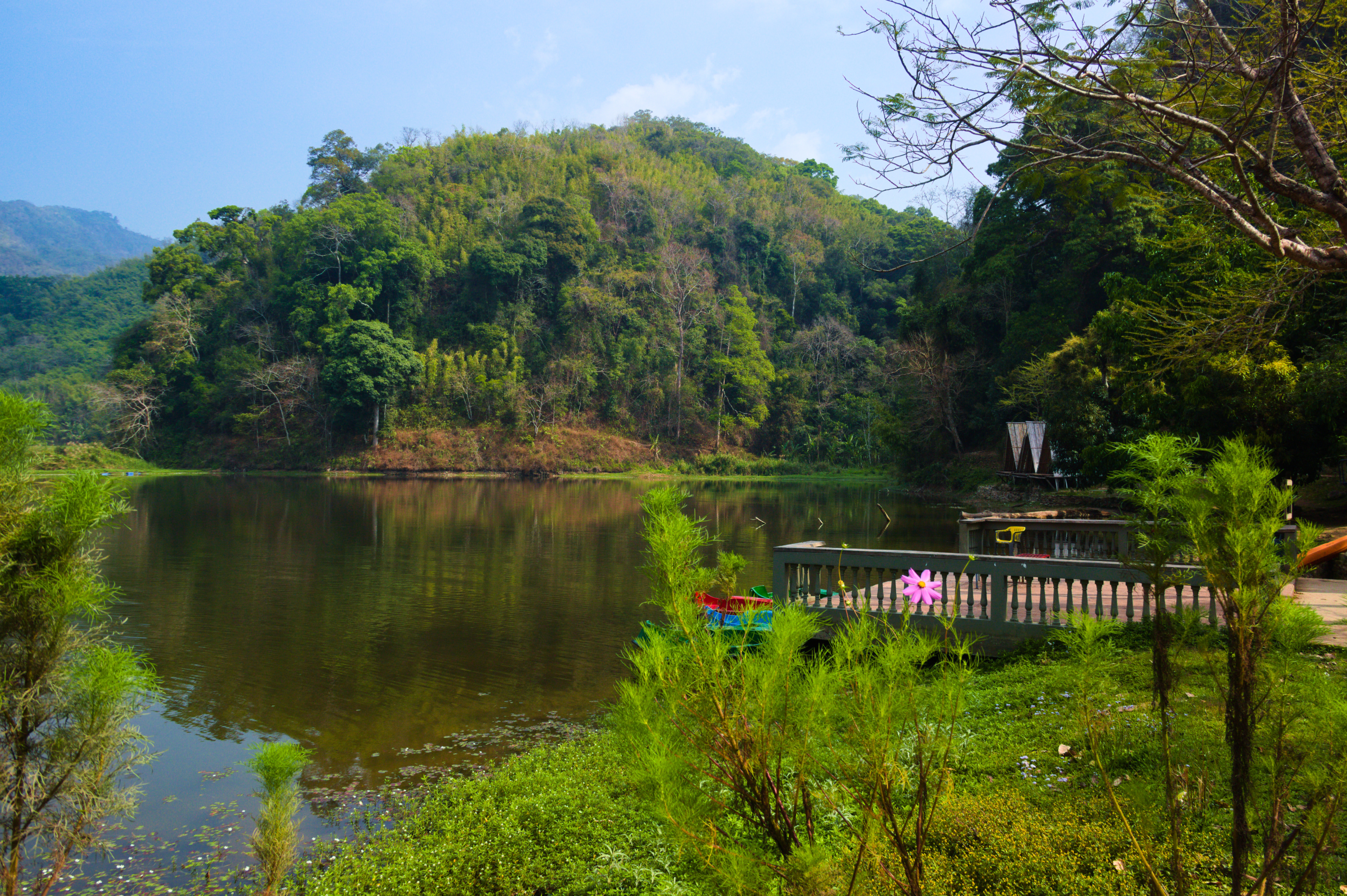
View near the entrance of the resort

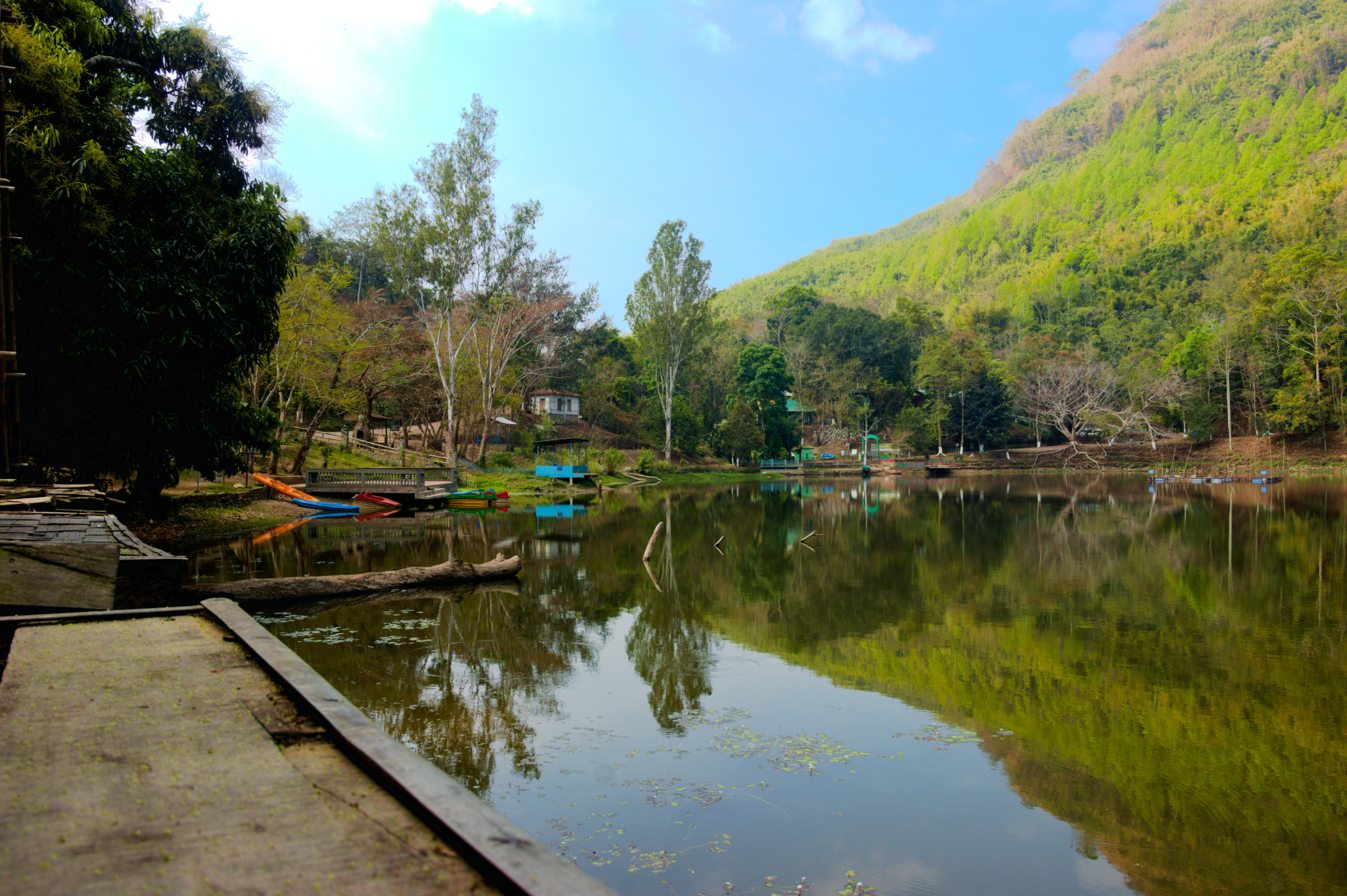
Wider view of the lake inside the resort

== See also ==
- Tourism in Mizoram
