= Tuivawl =

Coordinates: 24°07′N 92°58′E

Tuivawl River
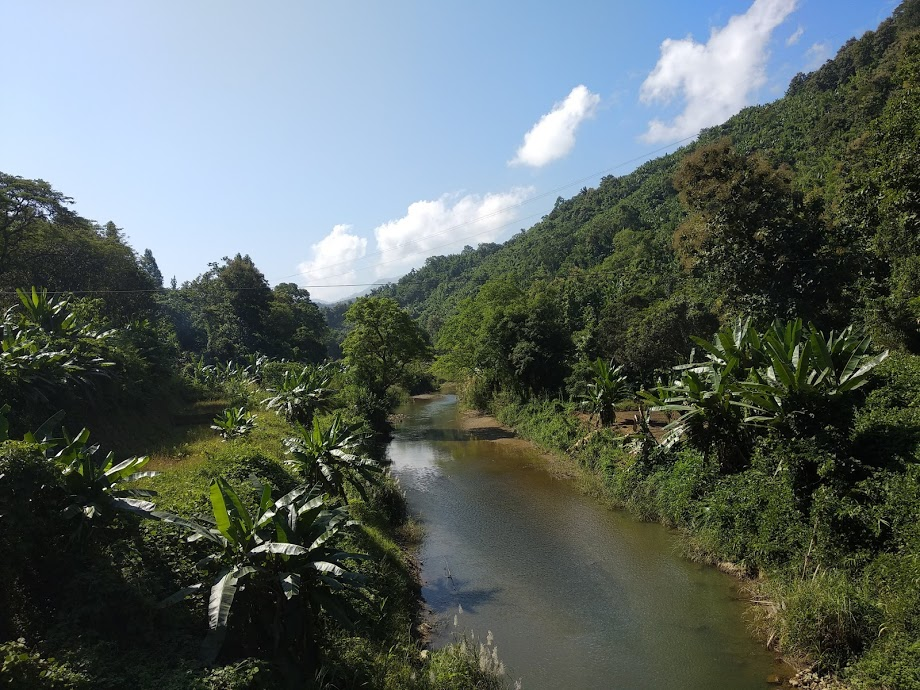

Location
- Country: India
- State: Mizoram, Assam

Physical characteristics
- Length: 72.45 km (45.02 mi)

The Tuivawl is a river of Mizoram, northeastern India. It flows in a northerly direction.

== Geography ==
The river is about 72.45 kilometres (45.02 mi) long. It raises near Chhawrtui village, travels along Vanbawng village and later joins Barak River.
