= Saitual district =

- District of Mizoram
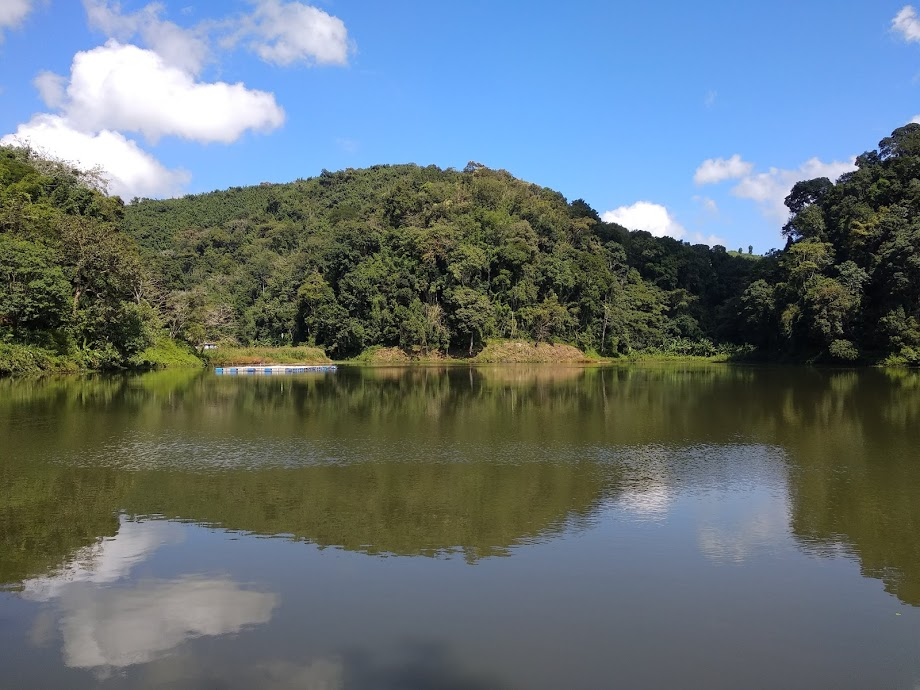
- Tam Dil in Saitual District

- Location in Mizoram
- Saitual district
- Interactive map of Saitual district
- Coordinates (Saitual): 23.69°N 92.96°E
- Country: India
- State: Mizoram
- Headquarters: Saitual

Government
  - Lok Sabha constituencies: Mizoram

Demographics
- Time zone: UTC+05:30 (IST)
- Website: saitual.nic.in

Saitual district is one of the eleven districts of Mizoram state in India. Saitual district became operational on 3 June 2019 The district headquarters is Saitual.

== History ==
The demand for Saitual district had started from 1974. The Citizen Committee was established in 1993. The Saitual District Implementing Demand Committee, consisting of several civil society groups, staged demonstrations to demand a full-fledged district. Saitual district was finally created on 12 September 2008.

== Transport ==
The distance between Saitual and Aizawl (the state capital) is 77 km. They are connected by regular bus and maxicab services.

== Divisions ==
The district has three legislative assembly constituencies: Chalfilh, Ṭawi and Lengteng. There are 37 inhabited towns and villages in the district with 10,219 families (50,575 people) residing in them. There are 25,607 men and 24,968 women. The district capital has 2,457 families with a population of 11,619 people.

== See also ==
- Luangpawn, village in Saitual district
- Vanbawng, village in Saitual district
