= Sakawrdai =

- Location within Mizoram Location within India
- Coordinates: 24.2268779°N 92.9538125°E
- Country: India
- State: Mizoram
- District: Aizawl

Population (2011)
  - Total: 3,000

Languages
  - Communication: Hmar & Mizo
- Time zone: UTC+5:30 (IST)
- Vehicle registration: MZ01
- Website: mizoram.nic.in

Sakawrdai is a Medium town in Aizawl District in the state of Mizoram, India.
