= Sinlung Hills Council =

Local administrative body in Mizoram, India

Type
- Type: Local Administrative Council
- Term limits: 5 years

Leadership
- Chief Executive Member: Ricky Lalremsanga
- Chairman: R. Lalfakzuala
- Deputy Chairman: Benjamin Lalrawnliana
- Executive members: 4
- Seats: 14 Councillors (12 elected, 2 nominated)

Meeting place
- Aizawl / Sakawrdai

The Sinlung Hills Council (SHC) is a local administrative body in Mizoram, India. Unlike other Autonomous District Councils in the state, the council has limited administrative autonomy. It was created on 9 July 2018 as an administrative body for the Hmar people and covers Hmar-dominated areas in northern Mizoram across the Aizawl, Kolasib and Saitual districts.

The term Sinlung refers to the supposed ancestral origin of the Hmar people. The headquarters of the council is located in Aizawl.

== History ==
Sinlung Hills Council covers an area in and around the inter-state borders with neighbouring Assam and Manipur in the north eastern corner of Mizoram. The Council covers 31 Villages under 3 (three) different Rural Development Blocks and under 3 (three) different districts. As per the 2011 census, it has a population of 30,160 with a literacy rate of 94.68% and a Scheduled Tribe population of 95.27%.

In July 1986, some Hmar leaders in Mizoram formed the Mizoram Hmar Association (MHA), which was later renamed as the Hmar People's Convention (HPC). The HPC spearheaded a political movement for social, economic, cultural and educational advancement of the Hmar people in line with the Autonomous District Councils (ADCs) of the Lai, Mara and Chakma. The HPC representatives and the Government of Mizoram, after multiple rounds of talks, signed a Memorandum of Settlement (MoS) in Aizawl on 27 July 1994 and the Sinlung Hills Development Council was officially formed on 27 August 1997.

At the time of the MoS signing in 1994, some of the HPC leaders formed the HPC (Democratic), which has continued an armed movement for autonomy within Mizoram. To end a prolonged militancy in Mizoram, a series of peace talks was held between the Government of Mizoram and the Leaders of the Hmar People's Convention (Democratic). Settlement on various issues were reached during the course of the Talk and Memorandum of Settlement to give enhanced autonomy in the manner of administration, in the sphere of socio-economic, political and cultural development of the people under the jurisdiction of the Sinlung Hills Council was signed between the Government of Mizoram and the Leaders of the Hmar People's Convention (Democratic) on 2 April 2018. Sinlung Hills Council was established by the Sinlung Hills Council Act, 2018 (No. 6 of 2018) which came into force on 5 July 2018.

== Area & Population ==
The council comprises 31 villages in the Hmar-dominated northeastern part of Mizoram. It covers three assembly constituencies in the districts of Aizawl, Kolasib and Saitual.

SHC estimated population

Sl. No.	Village	Population (2011)
1	Daido	603
2	East Damdiai	205
3	Khawlian	1,804
4	Khawpuar	556
5	Lamherh	598
6	Lungsum	413
7	Mauchar	1,375
8	N. Khawdungsei	251
9	N. Khawlek	769
10	N. Tinghmun	873
11	N.E. Tlangnuam	658
12	New Vervek	729
13	North Chawnpui	389
14	Palsang	370
15	Phainuam	1,727
16	Phuaibuang	2,134
17	Ratu	2,176
18	Saihapui V	368
19	Sailutar	536
20	Saiphai	2,052
21	Saipum	2,359
22	Sakawrdai	2,649
23	Suangpuilawn	1,724
24	Sunhluchhip	568
25	Thingsat	154
26	Sakawrdai	2,649
27	Vaitin	1,069
28	Vanbawng	1,231
29	Zawngin	617
30	Zohmun	1,399
31	Zokhawthiang	955
Total		35,127 (Estimate)

The total population is an approximate calculation based on the 2011 Census of India data for 29 villages, with population data for East Damdiai derived from a 2009 village record and Mauchar obtained from the Directorate of Economics and Statistics, Government of Mizoram.

== Composition ==
The council has 14 members. 12 of whom are elected and 2 are nominated. The council is headed by a Chief Executive Member.

== Election ==
=== 2019 SHC election ===
About 20,914 voters were eligible to vote for the election. It was the first election since its election. The MNF-HPC alliance won 10 seats, and Independents won 2 seats.

=== 2nd General Election to Sinlung Hills Council, 2024 ===
The alliance between the Mizo National Front (MNF) and the Hmar People's Convention (Reformed) (HPC-R) secured a majority in the Sinlung Hills Council elections held on 5 November 2024.

The MNF–HPC(R) combine won seven seats in the 12-member council, surpassing the simple majority mark required to form the executive body. The ruling alliance between the Zoram People's Movement (ZPM) and the Hmar People's Convention (HPC) suffered defeat in the polls, with ZPM winning three of the eight seats it contested.

The HPC failed to secure any seats out of the four constituencies it contested, while the Indian National Congress managed to win one seat out of the twelve it contested. The Bharatiya Janata Party (BJP), which contested one constituency, failed to win any seats.

Election officials reported that a total of 49 candidates, including one woman, contested the election, and voter turnout stood at 71.69 percent of the 23,789 eligible voters.

Structure of the Sinlung Hills Council after the 2024 election

Party	Seats	Colour
MNF	5	
ZPM	4	
HPC-R	2	
INC	1	

=== Final Voter Turnout Report of 2024 election ===
Submitted to the Commission at 5:00 PM after the Close of Poll

Sinlung Hills Council Election 2024 – Final Voter Turnout
Constituency	Polling Station	Male Voters	Female Voters	Total	Male Votes Cast	Female Votes Cast	Total	Percent
1-Khawlian	1/1 – Khawlian I	373	357	730	244	196	440	60.27
1-Khawlian	1/2 – Khawlian II	403	356	759	303	246	549	72.33
1-Khawlian	1/3 – NE Tlangnuam	220	261	481	136	138	274	56.96
1-Khawlian	1/4 – Daido	212	210	422	139	133	272	64.45
1-Khawlian	Sub-Total	1208	1184	2392	822	713	1535	64.17
2-Phuaibuang	2/1 – Phuaibuang I	507	482	989	390	348	738	74.62
2-Phuaibuang	2/2 – Phuaibuang II	366	389	755	286	271	557	73.77
2-Phuaibuang	Sub-Total	873	871	1744	676	619	1295	74.25
3-Suangpuilawn	3/1 – Suangpuilawn I	332	373	705	237	242	479	67.94
3-Suangpuilawn	3/2 – Suangpuilawn II	377	337	714	275	254	529	74.09
3-Suangpuilawn	3/3 – Zawngin	260	251	511	207	187	394	77.10
3-Suangpuilawn	Sub-Total	969	961	1930	719	683	1402	72.64
4-Vanbawng	4/1 – Vanbawng	463	469	932	356	301	657	70.49
4-Vanbawng	4/2 – Lamherh	222	182	404	160	149	309	76.49
4-Vanbawng	4/3 – Khawlek	339	306	645	195	216	411	63.72
4-Vanbawng	Sub-Total	1024	957	1981	711	666	1377	69.51
5-Ratu	5/1 – Ratu I	352	451	803	252	272	524	65.26
5-Ratu	5/2 – Ratu II	495	510	1005	314	337	651	64.78
5-Ratu	5/3 – Sailutar	186	214	400	133	146	279	69.75
5-Ratu	5/4 – Sunhluchhip	199	176	375	157	126	283	75.47
5-Ratu	Sub-Total	1232	1351	2583	856	881	1737	67.25
6-New Vervek	6/1 – New Vervek	307	310	617	247	247	494	80.06
6-New Vervek	6/2 – Lungsum	188	175	363	158	134	292	80.44
6-New Vervek	6/3 – Damdiai	112	113	225	90	90	180	80.00
6-New Vervek	Sub-Total	607	598	1205	495	471	966	80.17
7-Sakawrdai South	7/1 – Sakawrdai II	433	459	892	325	313	638	71.52
7-Sakawrdai South	7/2 – Thingsat	92	73	165	68	58	126	76.36
7-Sakawrdai South	7/3 – N Khawdungsei	82	74	156	69	47	116	74.36
7-Sakawrdai South	Sub-Total	607	606	1213	462	418	880	72.55
8-Sakawrdai North	8/1 – Sakawrdai I	606	613	1219	419	444	863	70.80
8-Sakawrdai North	8/2 – Vaitin	479	457	936	308	286	594	63.46
8-Sakawrdai North	8/3 – Khawpuar	198	207	405	138	126	264	65.19
8-Sakawrdai North	8/4 – Upper Sakawrdai	46	66	112	35	46	81	72.32
8-Sakawrdai North	Sub-Total	1329	1343	2672	900	902	1802	67.44
9-Zohmun	9/1 – Zohmun	534	543	1077	414	385	799	74.19
9-Zohmun	9/2 – Palsang	171	165	336	143	117	260	77.38
9-Zohmun	Sub-Total	705	708	1413	557	502	1059	74.95
10-Tinghmun	10/1 – Tinghmun	384	379	763	319	290	609	79.82
10-Tinghmun	10/2 – Zokhawthiang	94	92	186	63	63	126	67.74
10-Tinghmun	10/3 – Mauchar	380	384	764	296	291	587	76.83
10-Tinghmun	Sub-Total	858	855	1713	678	644	1322	77.17
11-Saipum	11/1 – Saipum-I	447	464	911	365	359	724	79.47
11-Saipum	11/2 – Saipum-II	536	540	1076	436	414	850	79.00
11-Saipum	11/3 – Chawnpui	151	157	308	102	121	223	72.40
11-Saipum	Sub-Total	1134	1161	2295	903	894	1797	78.30
12-Saiphai	12/1 – Saiphai-I	341	309	650	243	222	465	71.54
12-Saiphai	12/2 – Saiphai-II	422	440	862	318	345	663	76.91
12-Saiphai	12/3 – Phainuam	473	485	958	318	303	621	64.72
12-Saiphai	12/4 – Saihapui 'V'	93	85	178	72	62	134	75.28
12-Saiphai	Sub-Total	1329	1319	2648	951	932	1883	71.11
GRAND TOTAL		11875	11914	23789	8730	8325	17055	71.69

Sinlung Hills Council Election 2024 – Consolidated Result
Constituency	Candidate	Party	Votes	Result
1-Khawlian	Andrew Zothansanga	BJP	55	
	Lalrawngbawla	INC	415	Elected
	Rochungnunga	MNF	336	
	K. Hrangkunga	HPC	380	
	Lalpuithanga	IND	47	
	J. Thantluanga	IND	293	
	NOTA	-	1	
2-Phuaibuang	Lallianzama	INC	273	
	LordJoyFulla	MNF	262	
	Vanlalsiamsanga	ZPM	429	Elected
	J. Lalchhanhima	IND	314	
	NOTA	-	5	
3-Suangpuilawn	M. Dawngliana	INC	501	
	Lalvenhima Hmar	ZPM	542	Elected
	Vanlaltluangliana	MNF	244	
	Rinpuia	IND	105	
	NOTA	-	2	
4-Vanbawng	Lalfakawma	INC	192	
	H.C. Lalhunhlua	ZPM	519	
	Ricky Lalremsanga	MNF	643	Elected
	NOTA	-	19	
5-Ratu	Lalhmingthanga	MNF	714	Elected
	Lalthlamuana	INC	382	
	Saizawna Sailo	ZPM	610	
	NOTA	-	3	
6-New Vervek	Lalhlunchhunga	ZPM	396	Elected
	C. Lalnuntlanga	MNF	384	
	P.C. Vanlalthlana	INC	80	
	C. Vanlalhruaia	IND	93	
	NOTA	-	0	
7-Sakawrdai South	Lalrokima	INC	287	
	Lalhriatchhunga Hmar	IND	366	Elected
	Lalremruata Varte	IND	211	
	NOTA	-	4	
8-Sakawrdai North	Lalrammuanpuia	ZPM	788	
	H.C. Lalthanglura	INC	144	
	Melody Lalchhuangzeli	IND	842	Elected
	NOTA	-	3	
9-Zohmun	Benjamin Lalrawnliana	MNF	416	Elected
	Biakchungnunga	INC	241	
	H.C. Lalmalsawma	ZPM	387	
	NOTA	-	0	
10-Tinghmun	R. Lalfakzuala	MNF	306	Elected
	Lalzoliana	INC	206	
	Daniela	IND	184	
	H. Lalchhuanawma	IND	234	
	Vanlalhlua	IND	118	
	Zoramthanga Ralte	IND	248	
	NOTA	-	2	
11-Saipum	Laldawmliana	MNF	243	
	Lalmuanpuia Ngurte	INC	431	
	Lalrawngbawla	ZPM	455	Elected
	Eleazer Rozarmawia	IND	280	
	Lalropianga	IND	200	
	Timothy Lalzamlova	IND	157	
	NOTA	-	3	
12-Saiphai	Lalthlirlien Hmar	INC	490	
	Zokhumthanga	MNF	516	Elected
	H.L. Banliana	HPC	459	
	H.A. Dawngliana	IND	391	
	NOTA	-	17	
