= Mizo Hmeichhe Insuihkhawm Pawl =

Organization fighting for women's rights

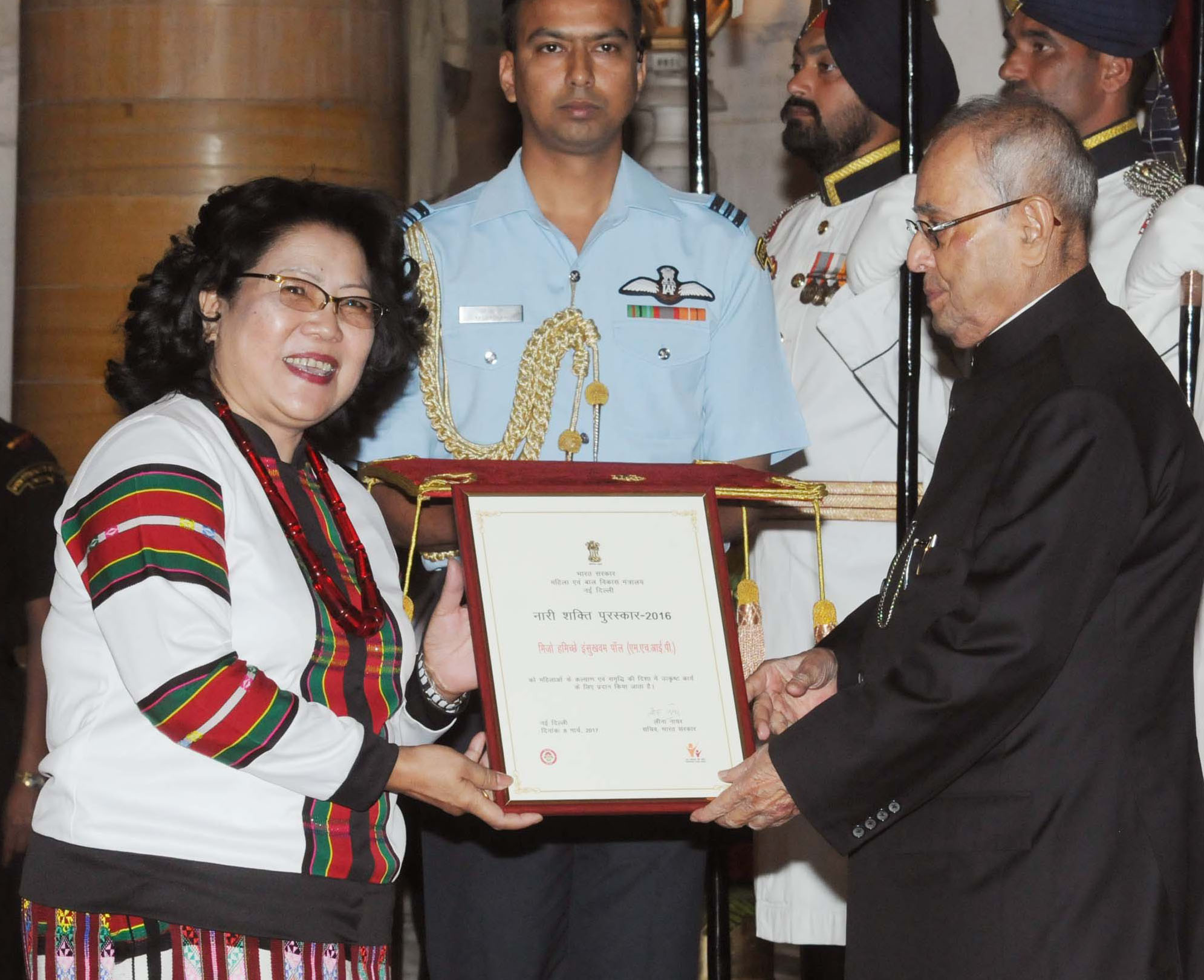
- A representative of MHIP receives the Nari Shakti Puraskar from President Pranab Mukherjee at Rashtrapati Bhavan, 2017
- Abbreviation: MHIP
- Formation: 6 July 1974; 52 years ago
- Founder: B. Sangkhumi
- Founded at: Aizawl, Mizoram, India
- Type: Non-governmental organisation
- Legal status: Registered society (Reg. No. 5 of 1977, Societies Registration Act, 1860)
- Headquarters: Treasury Square, Aizawl
- Region served: Mizoram
- Members: Women aged 14 and above
- Official language: Mizo
- Award: Nari Shakti Puraskar (2016)

Mizo Hmeichhe Insuihkhawm Pawl (meaning "binding women together" in the Mizo language), abbreviated MHIP, is a women's non-governmental organisation based in the Indian state of Mizoram. It was formed on 6 July 1974, when Mizoram was still a union territory of India, and is the largest women's organisation in the state. The organisation was registered under the Societies Registration Act, 1860 as Registration No. 5 of 1977 and is headquartered at Treasury Square, Aizawl.The group's primary aim is to empower women and to defend their rights, particularly through reform of Mizo customary law and through grassroots social work. Its emblem, a stylised hmui (spinning wheel), is intended to symbolise the creativity and self-reliance of Mizo women, recalling the implement used to weave the traditional puanchei. The organisation's founding ethos draws on the Mizo social value of tlawmngaihna (selfless service to the community).

== Structure ==
The MHIP is organised as a federated body. Its General Headquarters in Aizawl is supported by seven sub-headquarters located at each district headquarters of Mizoram, which are further divided into sixteen blocks and several hundred village branches; the organisation itself records more than 700 branches, while external accounts give figures of around 740. Any Mizo woman aged 14 years or above may join on payment of a nominal fee at her local village branch, and any organisation engaged exclusively in social welfare work for women may also affiliate with the MHIP. The organisation is funded principally by membership fees, donations and ad hoc fundraising by its members, and does not receive an assured grant from either the state or the Union government.

The MHIP was led for several decades by B. Sangkhumi, a recipient of the Padma Shri, and was subsequently led by Lalthlamuani. Sangkhumi documented the history of the organisation's first 35 years in the book MHIP Chanchin 1974 to 2009.

== Activities ==
The MHIP has been the principal driver of statutory reform of Mizo customary family law. From 1980 it began submitting formal recommendations to the Government of Mizoram on the position of women in marriage, divorce and inheritance. In 2013 the organisation was behind several bills proposed in the Mizoram Legislative Assembly, including the Mizo Marriage Bill, the Mizo Inheritance Bill and the Mizo Divorce Bill. The resulting 2014 Mizo Marriage, Divorce and Inheritance of Property Act abolished the customary practice under which a divorced wife was left with nothing, providing instead that she could receive up to fifty per cent of marital property. The MHIP has also advocated for a statutory ban on the Mizo customary bride price (man) and for a 33 per cent reservation for women in political office. During the 2018 assembly elections, the organisation repeated its call for more women to stand as candidates.

At the branch level, the MHIP intervenes in cases of domestic violence, child neglect and family breakdown; supports unmarried mothers and survivors of sexual violence; and provides counselling, vocational training and small-scale financial assistance. The General Headquarters maintains a mandatory programme of Christmas institutional visits, with gift packages distributed each year to the Civil Hospital and Tuberculosis Hospital in Aizawl, the Synod Hospital at Durtlang, the Hermon Children's Home, Central Jail at Tanhril and several de-addiction and destitute homes in and around the capital. The organisation has also organised state-wide public processions in towns including Aizawl, Lunglei, Kolasib, Champhai and Saiha in response to high-profile crimes against women.

At its 20th General Assembly the MHIP recommended that women employees of the Government of Mizoram wear the traditional Mizo puan at least twice a week. On 4 September 2015 the state government issued a notification to that effect.

In May 2026 MHIP publicly condemned an alleged sex trafficking case in which five Mizo women, including two minors, were rescued from a spa in Rudrapur, Uttarakhand, in a joint operation by the Mizoram and Uttarakhand police. The organisation called for stringent punishment of those involved and urged Mizo communities and churches to remain vigilant against trafficking networks targeting women from the state.

Following the 2009 decision of the Delhi High Court in Naz Foundation v. Government of NCT of Delhi to decriminalise same-sex relationships, the MHIP joined an anti-LGBT alliance with the Mizoram Upa Pawl (MUP), the Young Mizo Association (YMA) and the Mizo Zirlai Pawl (MZP).

== MHIP Day ==
The anniversary of the organisation's founding, 6 July, is observed in Mizoram as MHIP Day (MHIP Ni), a regional public holiday and bank holiday across the state. The day is typically marked by state functions chaired by senior government officials, community service activities including environmental clean-ups, cultural performances and awareness programmes on women's rights.

== Recognition and awards ==
In 2016 the MHIP was awarded the Nari Shakti Puraskar, the highest civilian award conferred by the Government of India in recognition of services rendered to women's empowerment, by the Ministry of Women and Child Development. The award was presented at Rashtrapati Bhavan on the occasion of International Women's Day by President Pranab Mukherjee.

== See also ==
- Young Mizo Association
- Mizo Zirlai Pawl
- Mizoram Upa Pawl
- Women in India
- Mizo people
