= Saitual =

- Town
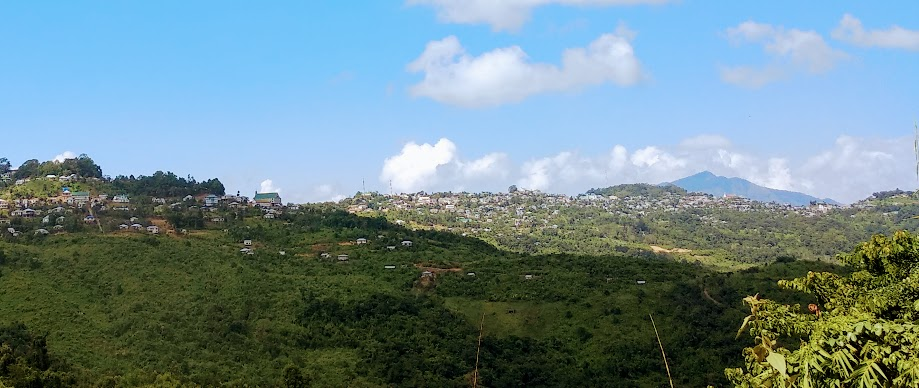

- Location within Mizoram Location within India
- Coordinates: 23.689630°N 92.955670°E
- Country: India
- State: Mizoram
- District: Saitual

Area
  - Total: 1,757.34 km^{2} (678.51 sq mi)

Population (2001)
  - Total: 50,575
  - Density: 28.779/km^{2} (74.538/sq mi)

Languages
  - Official: Mizo
- Time zone: UTC+5:30 (IST)
- Postal code: 796261
- Vehicle registration: MZ 10
- Website: dcsaitual.mizoram.gov.in

Saitual is a town located in the Indian state of Mizoram. It serves as the administrative headquarters of the newly created Saitual district.

== History and toponym ==
The present settlement was founded by one chief of Sailo clan Dorawta, who after conversion wanted to establish a Christian village in the year 1915. At first, about 16 families joined him but later more people joined him in 1916. As the population increased gradually, schools and other government establishments were created. There is, however, disagreement about who founded the village. According to the dissenters, about 12 families had already settled in Saitual in 1912. Since the fledgling village was situated in the land of the ruling Sailo clan, Dorawta Sailo was requested to become the chief of the village which he materialized in 1915. As Saitual celebrated its centennial year in 2015, it may be taken as a fact that Chief Dorawta Sailo actually administered this village from 1915. It appears that a village founded by about 12 to 16 families prior to 1915 became a Sailo village since 1915.

== Demographics ==
As of 2001 India census, Saitual had a population of 10,243.

== Transport ==
National Highway-06 traverses Saitual town. The road distance between Saitual and Aizawl is roughly 77 km and is connected with regular public transport including bus service and maxicab service. The helipad situated at Saihmar Tlang near Saitual provides air transport in which helicopter service is available.

== Media ==
The Major Newspapers in Saitual is the Saitual Post.

== Education ==
Government Saitual College under Mizoram University was established in 1984 with the initiatives from Saitual Local Community. It was later on upgraded into Govt. grant-in-aid Deficit Status on 1 April 1993. The Govt. of Mizoram provincialized it on 11 October 2007 and henceforth, Saitual College came to be re-christened as Govt. Saitual College.

Govt. Saitual College is an under-graduate, co-educational, purely Arts streams institution and is affiliated to Mizoram University offering seven disciplines viz., English, Mizo, Pol. Science, History, Economics, Education & Geography. Physical, intellectual and spiritual development of an individual is the main aims & objectives of the institution. It adopted “Brighter tomorrow” as its moto to guide the college’s journey through the ages.

The college provides a learner-friendly atmosphere and offers a wide range of facilities to enhance physical and mental development of the students. The college is equipped with facilities like Library, NIELIT, Ignou Study Centre, GIS Laboratory, Language Laboratory, etc. for the extension of their normal studies. The college also provides Volley ball Court, Tennis Court, Indoor Stadium, Basketball Court, Multi-Purpose Gymnasium, Women/Girl Hostel, Boys Hostel, Hockey Ground, Canteen, Students’ Common Room, etc. Regular College Bus service is available for the students to come to the college not only from the main town of Saitual but the surrounding villages also.
