= Darlawn =

- Census town
- Darlawn Vengpui Field, 2024

- Location within Mizoram Location within India
- Coordinates: 24.02°N 92.9°E
- Country: India
- State: Mizoram
- District: Aizawl
- Elevation: 870 m (2,850 ft)

Population (2001)
  - Total: 3,859

Languages
  - Official: Mizo
- Time zone: UTC+5:30 (IST)
- Vehicle registration: MZ
- Climate: Cwa
- Website: mizoram.nic.in

Darlawn is a census town in Aizawl district in the state of Mizoram, India.

== History ==
Darlawn town was established by a descendant of Lallula, Thuamluaia who was made chief by the Superintent of Lushai Hills John Shakespear in 1902.

== Geography ==
Darlawn is located at 24.02°N 92.9°E.

== Demographics ==
As of 2001 India census, Darlawn had a population of 3859.
