= Young Mizo Association =

Non-political and social organization of the Mizo people

- Official Logo
- Abbreviation: YMA
- Formation: June 15, 1935; 91 years ago
- Type: Voluntary association
- Legal status: Active Indian society
- Purpose: Heritage conservation Conservation of nature Charitable services
- Headquarters: Aizawl, Mizoram
- Region served: Northeast India
- Fields: Social work Community service
- Members: Any Mizo 18 and above
- Official language: Mizo
- General Secretary: Malsawmliana
- President: R. Lalngheta
- Website: Homepage
- Formerly called: Young Lushai Association

The Young Mizo Association (YMA) is the largest and most comprehensive non-profit, secular, nongovernmental organisation of the Mizo people. It was established on 15 June 1935, originally as the Young Lushai Association (YLA), which was later renamed as the "Young Mizo Association" in 1947. It was initiated by the Welsh Christian missionaries who understood the need of cultural conservation of the Mizo tribe, who were under pressure of political and social modernisations. In 1977, it was registered under Indian Societies Registration Act.

The association is administered by a central committee (Central YMA), headquartered at Aizawl, and under which there are 5 sub-headquarters, 49 groups and 805 branches, which covers all of Mizoram and some parts of Assam, Manipur, Meghalaya, Nagaland and Tripura.

== History ==
By 1935, Christianity had taken over most of the traditional Mizo lifestyle, formal education system had been introduced, British rule was about to be revoked and local administration was to be subjected to Indian politics. The basic tribal administrative system Zawlbuk was dissolving. The traditional social security, custom and training ground for young men was coming to an end, thereby necessitating a substitute of the tribal institution urgently. As serendipity would have it, a thunderstorm on the Monday evening of 3 June 1935, right after worship service, drove the Welsh missionaries and the Mizo church leaders to the nearby residence of Miss Kattie Hughes (known to Mizos as Pi Zaii), at Aijal (now Aizawl), wherein they made an impromptu proposal over a cup of tea for establishing an association that would unite all the Mizo people. As a Christian gathering, the initial proposed name was Young Mizo Christian Association, to rhyme with Young Men's Christian Association (YMCA), which on scrutiny they noticed had a restrictive and religious fundamentalist connotation. Then Rev David Edward (Zorema Pa) came up with "Young Lushai Association" akin to their familiar Young Wales Association in Wales. The name was unanimously accepted. It was also agreed that the association would be formally inaugurated on the coming 15 June.

The exact number and identity of the people attended were not recorded, but the following people were listed:

1. Rev David Edward (Zorama Pa)
2. Upa D. Ṭhianga
3. Rev Lewis Evans (Pu Niara)
4. Upa Chawngzika
5. Miss Kattie Hughes
6. Pu Muka
7. Rev Chhuahkhama
8. Pu Vankhuma
9. Pu L. Kailuia
10. Pu L.H. Liana
11. Upa Ch. Pasena

YLA was unveiled on 5 June 1935 at the grand public meeting at Nepali School, Sikulpuikawn, with a candle lighting ceremony and election of the officials. The first officers were:

- Rev Lewis Evans, President
- Rev Lewis Evans, Vice President
- Vankhuma and Upa Ch. Pasena, Secretaries
- Rev David Edward, Treasurer

Branches were soon created in every village, and all Mizo of age were soon registered members. The advent of Indian Independence incited new political and ethnic identity revivals in Mizoram (Lushai Hills, as it was called). For democratic administrative system, a political party was needed. As an organisation which was highly endorsed by the nation, YLA itself was suggested in 1945 to be the first political party. But the central committee objected to it, and this prompted the creation of a purely political party, the Mizo Union. Then the terminology "Mizo" began to have new revolutionary meaning, it had much more inclusive and panoramic implications than "Lushai", which in any case was the Welsh's misnomer for "Lusei", a major clan of the Mizo tribe. Consequently, the central YLA committee resolved to change YLA to "Young Mizo Association" (YMA) on 7 October 1947.

YMA is registered as SR No. 4 of 1977 under Indian Societies Registration Act (XXI of 1860) on 14 May 1977.

== Aims and objectives ==
YMA has three fundamental mottos:

- Good use of leisure (Hun âwl hman ṭhat)
- Development of the Mizo society (Zofate hmasawnna ngaihtuah)
- Revere Christian ethics (Kristian nun dan ṭha ngaihsân)

=== The ten commitments ===
YMA imposes its members of

1. Self-discipline and righteousness
2. Good management of family
3. Just and truthfulness
4. Tolerance
5. Politeness
6. Chivalry and usefulness
7. Social commitment
8. Respect for religion
9. Preservation of culture
10. Abstinence from liquor and drugs

YMA fosters an ethnic belonging that transcends national borders, both inter and intra.

== Emblem and colour ==
The emblem, as described in the constitution of Young Mizo Association, is a flamed torch with which the abbreviation YMA is written, which is in turn held by a hand inside a circle. The torch has three flames that signifies the three mottos of the association. The ten sparks radiating from the flames represent the ten commitments. A ribbon at the base bears an inscription "YMA" at the centre, with "ESTD"' written on the left side and "1935" on the right.

The official colour is a tricoloured horizontal stripe of equal sizes. The three colours represent the earliest man-made colours of the Mizo ancestors. First, red on top, denotes the brightness of the association. Second, white in the middle, shows sanctity. And the black bottom symbolizes a concern for the poor, the despair and the hapless.

== Publications ==
Young Mizo Association publishes a monthly magazine YMA Chanchinbu in Mizo since October 1973. It has a circulation of 10,000 copies. It also has a quarterly YMA News published in English.

== Awards and recognition ==
- Indira Priyadarshini Vrikshamitra Awards of 1986 from the Ministry of Environment and Forests, Government of India.
- Excellence Service Award from the Government of Mizoram for the three consecutive years, in 1988, 1989 and 1990.
- Indira Gandhi Paryavaran Puraskar of 1993 from the Ministry of Environment and Forests, Government of India.
- National Award for Outstanding Service in the field of Prevention of Alcoholism and Substance (Drug) Abuse as the "Best Non-Profit Institution" from the Ministry of Social Justice & Empowerment, Government of India. The award carries a medal, a citation and cash of INR 400,000. The award was presented by Pranab Mukherjee, the President of India, at Vigyan Bhawan, New Delhi, on 26 June 2013.

== Officers ==
The YMA officers are elected by the general body every two years. The 75th General Conference held at Sakawrdai during 21–23 October 2025 elected the following officers for 2025-2027:

- R. Lalngheta, President
- Lalnuntluanga, Vice President
- Malsawmliana, General Secretary
- S.F. David Ngursangzuala, Assistant Secretary
- H. Duhkima, Treasurer
- M.S. Ralte, Finance Secretary
