= Elections in Mizoram =

Elections in Mizoram have been conducted since 1972 to elect members of the Mizoram Legislative Assembly and Lok Sabha. There are 40 assembly constituencies and 1 Lok Sabha constituency.

== Lok Sabha elections ==
The elections for the Lok Sabha held since 1971.

Year	Lok Sabha Election	Winning Party/Coalition
1971	5th Lok Sabha	Mizo Union
1977	6th Lok Sabha	Independent
1980	7th Lok Sabha	Independent
1984	8th Lok Sabha	Indian National Congress
1989	9th Lok Sabha	Indian National Congress
1991	10th Lok Sabha	Indian National Congress
1996]	11th Lok Sabha	Indian National Congress
1998	12th Lok Sabha	Independent
1999	13th Lok Sabha	Independent
2004	14th Lok Sabha	Mizo National Front
2009	15th Lok Sabha	Indian National Congress
2014	16th Lok Sabha	Indian National Congress
2019	17th Lok Sabha	Mizo National Front
2024	18th Lok Sabha	Zoram People's Movement

== Legislative Assembly elections ==
The elections for the Mizoram Legislative Assembly began in 1972.

Year	Election	Winning Party/Coalition	Chief Minister
1972	First Assembly (Union Territory)	Mizo Union	Ch. Chhunga
1978	Second Assembly (Union Territory)	Mizo People's Conference	Thenphunga Sailo
1979	Third Assembly (Union Territory)	Mizo People's Conference	Thenphunga Sailo
1984	Fourth Assembly (Union Territory)	Indian National Congress	Pu Lalthanhawla
1987	First Assembly (State)	Mizo National Front	Pu Laldenga
1989	Second Assembly (State)	Indian National Congress	Pu Lalthanhawla
1993	Third Assembly (State)	Indian National Congress	Pu Lalthanhawla
1998	Fourth Assembly (State)	Mizo National Front	Pu Zoramthanga
2003	Fifth Assembly (State)	Mizo National Front	Pu Zoramthanga
2008	Sixth Assembly (State)	Indian National Congress	Pu Lalthanhawla
2013	Seventh Assembly (State)	Indian National Congress	Pu Lalthanhawla
2018	Eighth Assembly (State)	Mizo National Front	Pu Zoramthanga
2023	Ninth Assembly (State)	Zoram People's Movement	Lalduhoma
