= List of female members of the Mizoram Legislative Assembly =

This is a list of women who have been elected as members of the legislative assembly (MLAs) to the Mizoram Legislative Assembly.

== List ==
Party	Portrait	Name	Constituency	Year elected	Year left	Reason
MPC		Thanmawii	Serchhip	1978	1979	
MPC		Thanmawii	Aizawl East	1979	1984	
MPC		K. Thansiami	Aizawl West 1	1984	1987	
MNF (Note: elected as independent candidate)		Lalhlimpuii	Aizawl North 1	1987	1989	
MNF		Vanlalawmpuii Chawngthu	Hrangturzo	2014	2018	Defeated
ZPM		Baryl Vanneihsangi	Aizawl South 3	2023		Serving
ZPM		Lalrinpuii	Lunglei East	2023		Serving
MNF		Prova Chakma	West Tuipui	2023		Serving
