= Lalduhoma =

6th Chief Minister of Mizoram since 2023

- Official Portrait

6th Chief Minister of Mizoram
- Incumbent
- Assumed office 8 December 2023
- Governor: Kambhampati Hari Babu; Indrasena Reddy; V. K. Singh
- Cabinet: Lalduhoma
- Preceded by: Zoramthanga

Member of Mizoram Legislative Assembly
- Incumbent
- Assumed office 2018
- Preceded by: Lal Thanhawla
- Constituency: Serchhip
- In office 2008–2013
- Constituency: Aizawl West 1
- In office 2003–2008
- Constituency: Ratu

Member of Parliament, Lok Sabha
- In office 1984–1989
- Preceded by: R. Rothuama
- Succeeded by: C. Silvera
- Constituency: Mizoram

Leader of the Opposition in Mizoram Legislative Assembly
- In office 2018 – 28 November 2020
- In office 2021 – 5 December 2023

Personal details
- Born: 22 February 1949 (age 77) Tualpui, Lushai Hills, Assam, Dominion of India (present-day Mizoram, India)
- Party: Zoram People's Movement
- Other political affiliations: Indian National Congress; Mizo National Union; Mizoram People's Conference; Mizo National Front; Zoram Nationalist Party
- Spouse: Lian Sailovi (m. 1972)
- Children: 3 sons

Lalduhoma (alternatively spelled Lalduhawma; born 22 February 1949) is an Indian politician who serves as the Chief Minister of Mizoram. Formerly an Indian Police Service officer, he resigned from the security service to the Prime Minister Indira Gandhi, and was elected as Member of Parliament to the Lok Sabha from Mizoram and President of the Mizoram Pradesh Congress Committee (a branch of the Indian National Congress) in 1984. He however left the party from which he was elected two years later, for which he was disqualified from the Parliament. He became the first MP in India to be discharged based upon its anti-defection law.

Lalduhoma is the founder and president of Zoram Nationalist Party, a regional political party in Mizoram. His party joined the coalition party Zoram People's Movement, and he was chosen as its first Chief Ministerial candidate in the 2018 Mizoram Legislative Assembly election. He was elected from Aizawl West I and Serchhip constituencies, and chose to represent Serchhip since 2018.

While serving as leader of the legislature's opposition, he was disqualified as a Member of the Legislative Assembly on a charge of breaching the anti-defection law in 2020, becoming the first such case in Mizoram state legislature. He was re-elected via the same Serchhip constituency in a by-election in 2021. In the 2023 Mizoram Legislative Assembly election, the ZPM was elected in a landslide, defeating the ruling MNF.

== Early life ==
Lalduhoma is the son of a farmer, Vaisanga (L) and his wife Kaichhingi at Tualpui village. He is the youngest of four siblings. He studied at Khawzawl elementary and middle schools, and completed matriculation from G.M. High School at Champhai. He was appointed in 1972 as Personal Assistant at the Chief Minister's Office by Ch. Chhunga, the first Chief Minister of Mizoram. While working, he enrolled for an evening course of bachelor's degree and graduated with distinction from Gauhati University.

== Career ==
=== Government services ===
From 1972 to 1977 Lalduhoma worked as Personal Assistant to the Chief Minister of Mizoram. Following his graduation, he appeared for Indian civil services examinations at Shillong. Qualifying the Indian Police Service in 1977, he was posted as Assistant Superintendent of the Panaji subdivision in Goa. He soon made a reputation in his skill and gallantry in tracking and fighting against drug peddlers. His senior officer had warned him that it was impossible to crush any gang in Goa. Lalduhoma took up the challenged and went undercover, joined one of the largest gangs and becoming a trusted member. After a few month, he became the top boss (Deputy Leader as he was designated), the position of which he used to dismantle the entire organisation. News of his feat spread, and impressed the then-Prime Minister Indira Gandhi. In 1982, he was transferred to serve as security in charge of the Prime Minister at New Delhi. He was promoted to Deputy Commissioner of Police ahead of seven of his senior officers. He remained close the Gandhi family.

=== Indian National Congress ===
Inspired by Gandhi to work in politics (particularly regarding political and social turmoil that started in Mizoram in 1966 due to the Mizo National Front insurgency), Lalduhoma resigned from the police service to join the Indian National Congress party in 1984. Indira Gandhi's ministry entrusted him to resolve the insurgency by negotiating with the MNF leader, Laldenga. He visited Laldenga in London and persuaded him to join a peace talk with the Government of India. He also convinced Laldenga to inform the Mizo people that INC was the instrumental party of peace. As the elected Chief Minister Lal Thanhawla later reported, the recorded message made by Lalduhoma was key in the success of INC in the 1984 Mizoram Legislative Assembly election. Lalduhoma contested this result from the Lunglei constituency, but lost to Lalhmingthanga of People's Conference party. Realising his political situation, Indira Gandhi told the Governor of Mizoram H. S. Dubey to make provision and privileges for Lalduhoma. Laduhoma was immediately appointed Vice-Chairman of Mizoram State Planning Board, at the rank of cabinet ministers.

Lalduhoma was elected on 31 May 1984 as President of Mizoram INC. His political goal focussed on peace talks, and he arranged for Ladenga to return to India. Laldenga and Indira Gandhi were scheduled to meet in the afternoon of 31 October, but Gandhi was assassinated in that morning. In the 1984 Lok Sabha election in December, Laduhoma was elected as an INC candidate from the Mizoram constituency. He was compelled to abdicate as President of INC the same year. As his party failed to meet his expectations regarding peace actions, and accusations against him of conspiring against his party leaders, especially the president Lal Thanhawla, he withdrew his membership from INC in 1986. This represented a violation of the provision under the Anti-Defection Law of 1985 to remain in respective parties after legislative election. According to the Constitution of India (Fifty-Second Amendment of 1985) Tenth Schedule (paragraph 2 clause 1a), members of the Parliament and state legislature can be disqualified if they leave the party for which they were elected. The Lok Sabha Speaker disqualified him on 24 November 1988, and he became the first MP to be disqualified under the anti-defection law in India for giving up membership of the party which he represented. He later commented, saying, "I am proud of my first defection, of that decision... [because it was] for the cause of peace in my state, because the peace process was getting delayed." He formed Mizo National Union (MNU) (which later merged with Mizoram People's Conference) in 1986 and was made working President.

=== Zoram Nationalist Party ===
Lalduhoma, supported by the Students' Joint Action Committee and other political parties, created the Action for Peace Committee in 1986. While visiting New Delhi, Lalduhoma was informed that the state government had delayed the peace talk. The committee demanded that the state ministry resign from the legislature, organising public protests in early June followed by a mass hunger strike on 23 June. The protests prompted a peace talk that culminated in the signing of the Mizoram Peace Accord on 30 June.

The insurgency was officially terminated and the Mizo National Front became a recognised political party which was offered the state legislature. Lalduhoma joined the MNF as an advisor. He unsuccessfully contested the Lok Sabha election of 1991 and 1993 Assembly election on the MNF ticket. He split from them to establish Mizo National Front (Nationalist), which was renamed Zoram Nationalist Party, in 1997. As a ZNP candidate, he was elected to the Mizoram Legislative Assembly from the Ratu Assembly Constituency in the 2003 election, and from the Aizawl West 1 Constituency in the 2008 election.

=== Zoram People's Movement ===
In the 2018 election, he and his party joined a coalition party, the Zoram People's Movement (ZPM). The party officially declared him the Chief Ministerial candidate. This coalition party could not obtain recognition from the Election Commission of India as an official party at the time, so he contested as an independent candidate. He was elected in two constituencies, Aizawl West I and Serchhip, and chose to represent Serchhip, where he defeated the incumbent Chief Minister Lal Thanhawla by 410 votes.

He was elected as the leader of the opposition bench of the Members of the Legislative Assembly (MLA) in the Mizoram Legislative Assembly. He continued to serve as leader of ZPM, which became a registered political party in 2019. In September 2020, 12 MLAs from the ruling party, Mizo National Front, submitted a representation to the Mizoram Legislative Assembly Speaker Lalrinliana Sailo that Lalduhoma had violated the anti-defection law, because he had served as the leader of ZPM party while being elected as an independent candidate. According to the Anti-Defection Law (paragraph 2 clause 2), an independently elected member can be disqualified if he/she joins any party after election. Lalduhoma was disappointed and said, "I contested as independent because the registration of my party ZPM was not complete... The law is to punish defectors who join another party but I have remained faithful to the ZPM... My case is unprecedented in India." On 27 November 2020, the Speaker officially disqualified him from the legislature. He became the first MLA to be removed from the Mizoram Legislative Assembly, or any state legislature in India.

In a bypoll of the Serchhip constituency on 17 April 2021, Lalduhoma reclaimed the legislative seat by defeating his major opponent Vanlalzawma of the MNF party by 3,310 votes.

=== Chief Minister of Mizoram (2023-) ===
Pu Lalduhoma during the 2026 Independence Day celebrations at Lammual

Lalduhoma took oath as the 6th Chief Minister of Mizoram on 8 December 2023. He declared that farmers would be the main priority for his government, and that the new government will buy ginger, turmeric, chilli and broomsticks from the farmers. He also pledged to improve the state's fiscal condition.

== Personal life ==
Lalduhoma is married to Liansailovi. They have two sons and live at Chawlhhmun, Aizawl.

== Electoral history ==
=== Lok Sabha elections ===
| Year | Constituency | Party | Votes | % | Result |
|---|---|---|---|---|---|
| 1984 | Mizoram | INC | Uncontested | - | Won |
| 1991 | Mizoram | MNF | 82,019 | 34.09 | Lost |

=== Mizoram Legislative Assembly elections ===
| Year | Constituency | Party | Votes | % | Result |
|---|---|---|---|---|---|
| 1984 | Lunglei | INC | 3,129 | 44.04 | Lost |
| 1987 | Champhai | Independent | 2,014 | 37.97 | Lost |
| 1989 | Champhai | Independent | 948 | 10.00 | Lost |
| 1993 | Bilkhawthlir | MNF | 3,379 | 46.57 | Lost |
| 1998 | Aizawl South-II | MNF (Nationalist) | 3,109 | 30.60 | Lost |
| 2003 | Ratu | ZNP | 3,745 | 51.62 | Won |
| 2008 | Aizawl West-I | ZNP | 5,705 | 53.47 | Won |
| 2008 | Tuivawl | ZNP | 3,222 | 27.65 | Lost |
| 2013 | Kolasib | ZNP | 4,128 | 25.85 | Lost |
| 2013 | Aizawl West-I | ZNP | 4,894 | 28.05 | Lost |
| 2018 | Aizawl West-I | Independent | 7,889 | 53.60 | Won |
| 2018 | Serchhip | Independent | 5,481 | 51.94 | Won |
| 2021^{α} | Serchhip | ZPM | 8,269 | 49.83 | Won |
| 2023 | Serchhip | ZPM | 8,314 | 45.86 | Won |

^{α} By-election due to the disqualification of Lalduhawma from the legislature in 2020.
