= Bairabi Dam =

- Country: India
- Location: Bairabi

Dam and spillways
- Type of dam: Embankment, earth-fill
- Impounds: Tlawng River
- Height: 67 m (220 ft)
- Length: 182 m (597 ft)

Power Station
- Turbines: 2x40MW
- Installed capacity: 80 MW

Bairabi Dam is a proposed 80 MW dam on the Tlawng river near Bairabi Village in Kolasib district in the state of Mizoram in India.

== History ==
Bairabi Hydel Project is a 120 MW project initiated by Brig Ṭhenphunga Sailo during Mizoram People's Conference government. National Hydroelectric Power Corporation had started the survey and investigation of Detailed Project Implementation in 1982. NHPC prepared the feasibility reported on the basis of field investigations which were completed in 1982-83.

Due to the change in government in 1984, the Congress Government led by Pu Lalthanhawla came to power, Techno-Economic Clearance, Forest & Environment Clearance was pursued but not successful, hence Brahmaputra Board was asked to reinvestigate and prepare a DIPR, who reduced the power project from 120 MW to 80 MW.

The Mizo National Front Government under Pu Zoramthanga came to power in 2000, even though Techno-Economic Clearance and Forest Environment Clearances were received, but due to non availability of funds, no progress was made.

The Congress Government led by Pu Lalthanhawla came back to power in 2008, A MoU was signed between the Government of Mizoram and Sikaria Power Ltd, Kolkata on 10 August 2012 out of which the State Government will receive 13% free and the remaining amount will be sold to the government.
