= Serchhip Assembly constituency =

Constituency of the Mizoram legislative assembly in India

Coordinates: 23.308996°N 92.856701°E

Serchhip
- Constituency No. 26 for the Mizoram Legislative Assembly
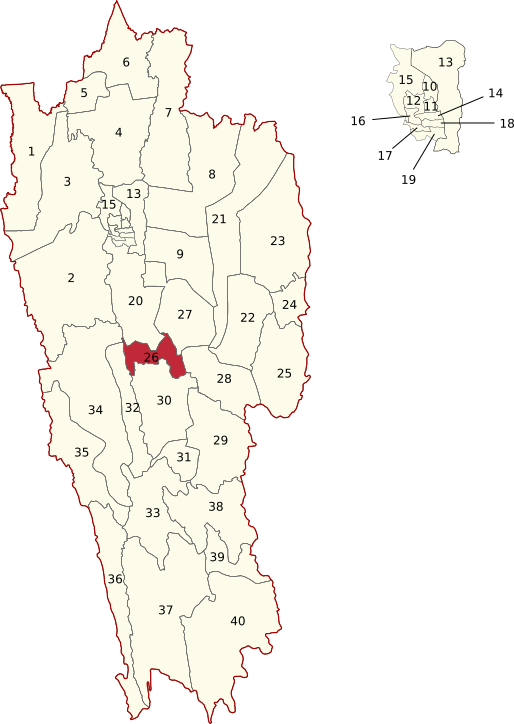

Constituency details
- Country: India
- Region: Northeast India
- State: Mizoram
- District: Serchhip
- Lok Sabha constituency: Mizoram
- Established: 1972
- Total electors: 15,906
- Reservation: ST

Member of Legislative Assembly
- 9th Mizoram Legislative Assembly
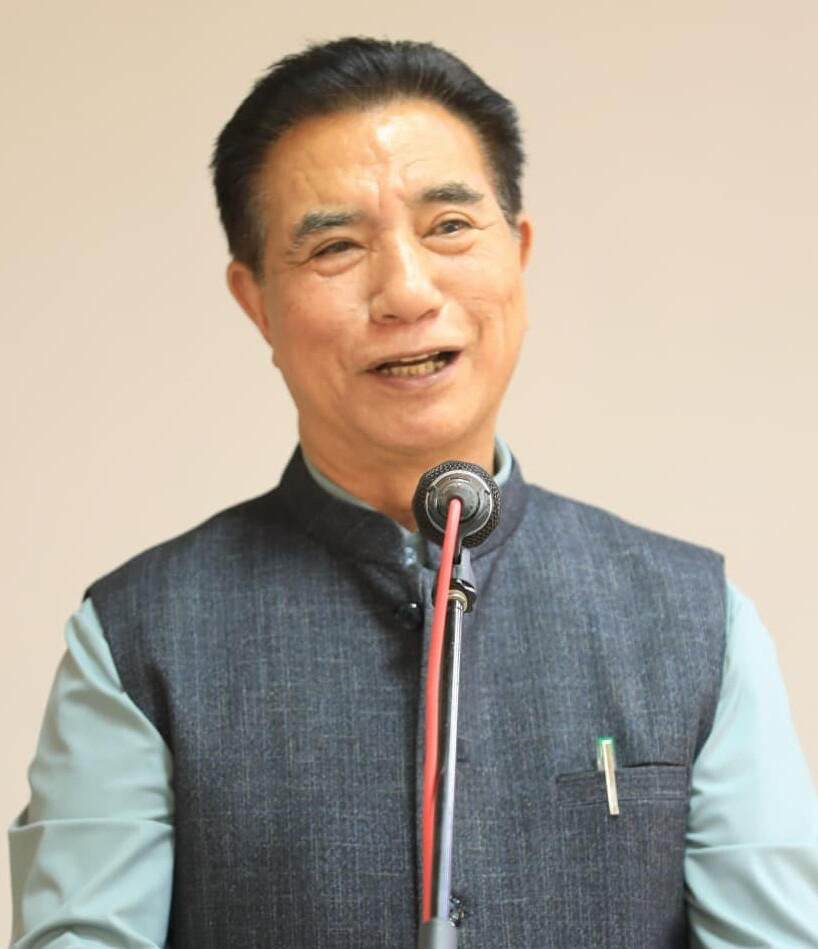
- Incumbent Lalduhoma; Chief Minister of Mizoram
- Party: ZPM
- Elected year: 2023

Serchhip is one of the 40 Legislative Assembly constituencies of Mizoram state in India. it has been a constituency since the first elections in the state in 1972.

It is part of Serchhip district and is reserved for candidates belonging to the Scheduled Tribes.Chief minister of state represents this constituency.

== Members of the Legislative Assembly ==
Year	Name	Party
1972	Vaivenga	Independent politician
1978	Thanmawii	Mizoram People's Conference
1979	Bualhranga	Mizoram People's Conference
1984	Lal Thanhawla	Indian National Congress
1987	Lal Thanhawla	Indian National Congress
1989	Lal Thanhawla	Indian National Congress
1993	Lal Thanhawla	Indian National Congress
1998	K. Thangzuala	Mizo National Front
2003	Lal Thanhawla	Indian National Congress
2008	Lal Thanhawla	Indian National Congress
2013	Lal Thanhawla	Indian National Congress
2018	Lalduhoma	Independent
2021	Lalduhoma	Zoram People's Movement
2023	Lalduhoma	Zoram People's Movement

^{1} By-election due to the disqualification of Lalduhawma from the legislature in 2020.

== Election results ==
=== 2023 ===
2023 Mizoram Legislative Assembly election: Serchhip
Party	Candidate	Votes	%	±%
ZPM	Lalduhoma	8314		
MNF	J. Malsawmzuala Vanchhawng	5332		
INC	R. Vanlaltluanga	4241		
BJP	K. Vanlalruati	97		
Independent	Lalawmpuia Renthlei	69		
Independent	Ramhlun Edena	21		
NOTA	None of the Above	54		
Majority		2982		
Turnout		18128		
ZPM hold		Swing		

=== 2021 by-election ===
By-election, 2021: Serchhip
Party	Candidate	Votes	%	±%
ZPM	Lalduhoma	8,269	49.95	
MNF	Vanlalzawma	5319	32.13	
INC	PC. Laltlansanga	2604	15.73	
BJP	Lalhriatrenga Chhangte	250	1.51	
MPC	Vanlalruata	38	0.43	
Independent	Ramhlun-Edena	43	0.26	
NOTA	None of the Above	32	0.19	
Majority		2950		
Turnout		16,595	84.16	
ZPM gain from Independent		Swing	ZPM Hold	

=== 2018 ===
2018 Mizoram Legislative Assembly election: Serchhip
Party	Candidate	Votes	%	±%
Independent	Lalduhoma	5,252		
NOTA	None of the Above			
Majority				
Turnout		15,543	85.65	
Independent gain from INC		Swing		

== See also ==
- List of constituencies of the Mizoram Legislative Assembly
- Serchhip district
