= 1989 Mizoram Legislative Assembly election =

Legislative Assembly election in Mizoram, India

- 22 January 1989

All 40 seats in the Mizoram Legislative Assembly 21 seats needed for a majority
- Registered: 333,733
- Turnout: 81.30%
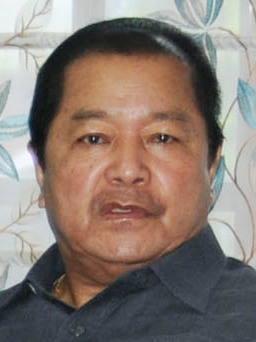

	Majority party	Minority party	Third party
Leader	Lal Thanhawla	Laldenga
Party	INC	MNF	MPC
Leader's seat	Serchhip	Aizawl South 2
Seats before	13	24	3
Seats won	23	14	1
Seat change	▲10	▼10	▼2
Popular vote	34.85%	35.29%	19.67%
CM before election
Lal Thanhawla
INC
Elected CM
Lal Thanhawla
MNF

Elections to the Mizoram Legislative Assembly were held on the 22nd January 1989 to elect members of the 40 constituencies in Mizoram, India. The Indian National Congress won the majority of seats and its leader in Mizoram, Lal Thanhawla was appointed as the Chief Minister of Mizoram; his second time in the role.

In 1987, the Mizo National Front won the elections and started governing for their 5-year term. But, within 18 months, there were defections from the party, by members who wanted Cabinet positions, which reduced the government to a minority in the Assembly. President's rule was imposed on Mizoram, in September 1988 and elections were called for in 1989.

== Parties Contested ==
No.	Party	Flag	Symbol	Leader	Seats contested
1.	Mizo National Front			Laldenga	40
2.	Mizoram People's Conference			T. Sailo	38
3.	Indian National Congress			Lal Thanhawla	34
4.	Independents			collective leadership	50

== Result ==
Party	Votes	%	Seats	+/–
Indian National Congress	93,561	34.85	23	▲10
Mizo National Front	94,763	35.29	14	▼10
Mizoram People's Conference	52,813	19.67	1	▼2
Independents	27,353	10.19	2	▲2
Total	268,490	100.00	40	0
Valid votes	268,490	98.95		
Invalid/blank votes	2,849	1.05		
Total votes	271,339	100.00		
Registered voters/turnout	333,733	81.30		
Source: ECI

== Elected members ==
#	Constituency	Candidate	Party
1	Tuipang	Hiphei	Indian National Congress
2	Saiha	S. Hiato	Indian National Congress
3	Sangau	H. Rammawi	Mizo National Front
4	Lawngtlai	F. Manghnuna	Indian National Congress
5	Chawngte	Nirupam	Indian National Congress
6	Tlabung	Hari Kristo Chakma	Indian National Congress
7	Buarpui	P. Lalbiaka	Indian National Congress
8	Lunglei South	F. Sapa	Indian National Congress
9	Lunglei North	R. Thangliana	Mizo National Front
10	Tawipui	P. Siamliana	Independent
11	Vanva	R. Romawia	Mizo National Front
12	Hnahthial	Vanlalanghaka	Indian National Congress
13	North Vanlaiphai	C. L. Ruala	Indian National Congress
14	Khawbung	K. Vanlalauva	Mizo National Front
15	Champhai	Zoramthanga	Mizo National Front
16	Khawhai	J. H. Rothuama	Mizo National Front
17	Saitual	Andrew Lalherliana	Independent
18	Khawzawl	Tawnluia	Mizo National Front
19	Ngopa	Zosiama Pachuau	Mizoram People's Conference
20	Suangpuilawn	Vanlalngena	Indian National Congress
21	Ratu	Lalrinchhana	Mizo National Front
22	Kawnpui	Vaivenga	Indian National Congress
23	Kolasib	Aichhinga	Mizo National Front
24	Bilkhawthlir	Zalawma	Indian National Congress
25	Lokicherra	Lalthanhawla	Indian National Congress
26	Kawrthah	Saikapthianga	Indian National Congress
27	Mamit	Lalhuthanga	Indian National Congress
28	Phuldungsei	Liansuama	Indian National Congress
29	Sateek	Lalrawnliana	Mizo National Front
30	Serchhip	Lalthanhawla	Indian National Congress
31	Lungpho	P. C. Bawihtluanga	Indian National Congress
32	Tlungvel	P. C. Zoramsangliana	Indian National Congress
33	Aizawl North 1	Rosangliana	Indian National Congress
34	Aizawl North 2	H. Thansanga	Indian National Congress
35	Aizawl East 1	John Lalsangzuala	Indian National Congress
36	Aizawl East 2	Rokamlova	Indian National Congress
37	Aizawl West 1	J. Tahnghuama	Mizo National Front
38	Aizawl West 2	Rualchhina	Mizo National Front
39	Aizawl South 1	R. Tlagghmingthanga	Mizo National Front
40	Aizawl South 2	Laldenga	Mizo National Front

== See also ==
- List of constituencies of the Mizoram Legislative Assembly
