= 1984 Mizoram Legislative Assembly election =

Legislative Assembly election in Mizoram, India

← 1979	25 April 1984	1987 →

All 30 seats in the Mizoram Legislative Assembly 16 seats needed for a majority
- Registered: 256,530
- Turnout: 73.43%
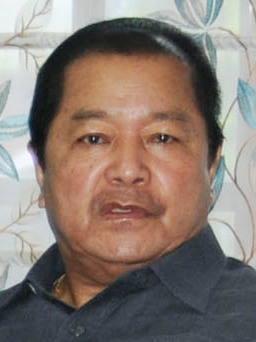

	Majority party	Minority party
Leader	Lal Thanhawla	T. Sailo
Party	INC(I)	MPC
Leader's seat	Serchhip	Buarpi
Seats before	5	18
Seats won	20	8
Seat change	▲15	▼10
Popular vote	39.81%	32.67%
CM before election
T. Sailo
MPC
Elected CM
Lal Thanhawla
INC

Elections to the Mizoram Legislative Assembly were held in April 1984 to elect members of the 30 constituencies in Mizoram, India. The Indian National Congress emerged as the single largest party and Lal Thanhawla was appointed as the Chief Minister of Mizoram.

== Parties Contested ==
No.	Party	Flag	Symbol	Leader	Seats contested
1.	Indian National Congress (I)			Lal Thanhawla	30
2.	Mizoram People's Conference			T. Sailo	27
3.	Independents			collective leadership	77

== Result ==
Party	Votes	%	Seats	+/–
Indian National Congress (I)	74,005	39.81	20	▲15
Mizoram People's Conference	66,065	35.54	8	▼10
Independents	45,819	24.65	2	▼3
Total	185,889	100.00	30	0
Valid votes	185,889	98.68		
Invalid/blank votes	2,490	1.32		
Total votes	188,379	100.00		
Registered voters/turnout	256,530	73.43		
Source: ECI

== Elected members ==
#	Constituency	Candidate	Party
1	Tuipang	Hiphei	Indian National Congress
2	Sangau	K. Sangchhum	Indian National Congress
3	Saiha	F. Lalramliana	Indian National Congress
4	Chawngtea	Arun Bikash	Indian National Congress
5	Demagiri	Harikristo	Indian National Congress
6	Buarpui	T. Sailo	Mizoram People's Conference
7	Lunglei	Lalhmingthana	Mizoram People's Conference
8	Tawipui	Z.D. Sangliana	Indian National Congress
9	Hnahthial	Vanlalnghaka	Indian National Congress
10	Nivanlaiphai	C. L. Ruala	Indian National Congress
11	Khawbung	Rochhunga Ralte	Indian National Congress
12	Champhai	Lalhlira	Indian National Congress
13	Khawhai	R. Lalawia	Indian National Congress
14	Saitual	K. Biakchungnunga	Mizoram People's Conference
15	Ngopa	Zosiama Pachuau	Mizoram People's Conference
16	Suangpuilawn	H. Thansanga	Indian National Congress
17	Ratu	R. Thangliana	Indian National Congress
18	Kawnpui	Vaivenga	Indian National Congress
19	Kolasib	Zalawma	Indian National Congress
20	Kawrthah	Saaikapthaianga	Indian National Congress
21	Sairang	Lalhuthanga	Indian National Congress
22	Phuldungsei	Liansuama	Indian National Congress
23	Sateek	J. Thanghuama	Indian National Congress
24	Serchhip	Lal Thanhawla	Indian National Congress
25	Lungpho	K.L. Lianchia	Mizoram People's Conference
26	Tlungvel	Lallawmsanga Zadeng	Mizoram People's Conference
27	Aizawal North	Zairemthanga	Mizoram People's Conference
28	Aizawal East	Rokamlova	Indian National Congress
29	Aizawal West	K. Thansiami	Mizoram People's Conference
30	Aizawal South	Sainghaka	Indian National Congress

=== Nominated members ===
There were also 3 nominated members: Pi Rokungi, Pu F. Lalchhawna and Pu Zoduha, all of the Indian National Congress.

== See also ==
- List of constituencies of the Mizoram Legislative Assembly
