= 2013 Mizoram Legislative Assembly election =

- 25 November 2013

All 40 seats in the Mizoram Legislative Assembly 21 seats needed for a majority
- Turnout: 83.41% (▲1.06%)
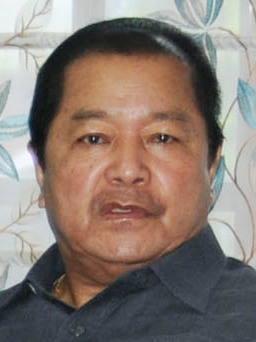

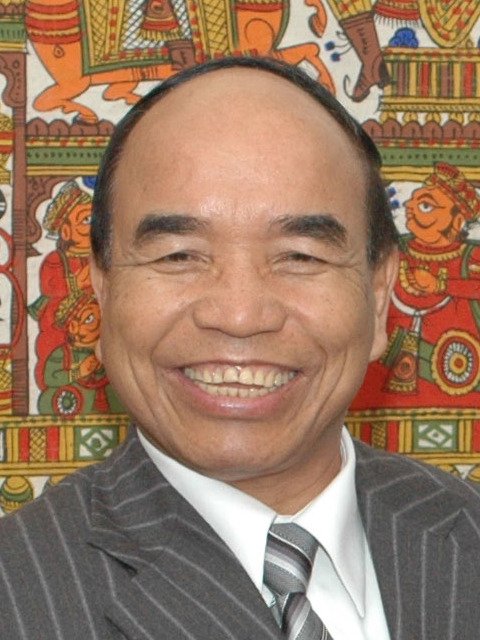

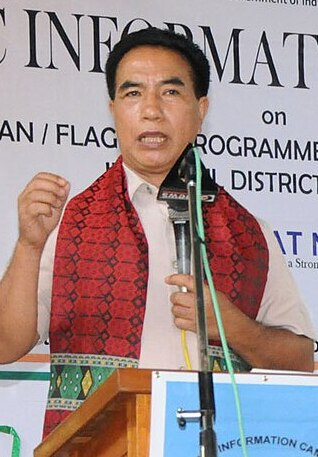
	First party	Second party	Third party
Leader	Lal Thanhawla	Zoramthanga	Lalduhoma
Party	INC	MNF	ZNP
Alliance	UPA	-	-
Leader's seat	Hrangturzo and Serchhip (both won)	East Tuipui (lost)	Aizawl West 1 and Kolasib (both lost)
Seats before	32	3	2
Seats won	34	5	0
Seat change	▲2	▲2	▼2
Popular vote	255,917	164,305	99,916
Percentage	44.3%	28.7%	17.3%
Swing	▲5.7%	▼2.0%	▲7.3%
CM before election
Pu Lalthanhawla
INC
Elected CM
Pu Lalthanhawla
INC

The Mizoram Legislative Assembly election, 2013 was held on 25 November 2013 in all 40 constituencies of the Legislative Assembly of Mizoram. Results were declared on 9 December. The main contest was between incumbent the Indian National Congress and the Mizo National Front led Mizoram Democratic Alliance. Incumbent Chief Minister Pu Lalthanhawla and his party Indian National Congress won a majority and continued in government.

== Background ==
The election for 40 seats legislative assembly was held on 25 November 2013. There were 6.9 lakh eligible voters. Voter-verified paper audit trail (VVPAT) along with EVMs was used on a large-scale for the first time in India, in 10 assembly seats out of 40 in Mizoram elections. The seven armed battalion of state police and 31 companies of central para-military forces and other state police were deployed for peaceful election.

=== Candidates ===
There were total 142 candidates including 40 Congress and 40 Mizoram Democratic Alliance (MDA) candidates. MDA candidates include 31 Mizo National Front (MNF), 8 Mizoram People's Conference (MPC) and one Maraland Democratic Front (MDF) candidates. 38 Zoram Nationalist Party, 17 Bharatiya Janata Party, 2 Nationalist Congress Party and one Jai Maha Bharath Party candidate also contested. There were total six female candidates including 3 Bharatiya Janata Party candidates, one Congress, one MNF and one other female candidate. All the seats were reserved for Scheduled Tribe candidates, except Lunglei South.

== Parties and alliances ==
=== Mizoram Democratic Alliance ===
No.	Party	Flag	Symbol	Leader	Seats contested
1.	Mizo National Front			Zoramthanga	31
2.	Mizoram People's Conference			T. Sailo	8
3.	Maraland Democratic Front			P. P. Thawla	1

=== United Progressive Alliance ===
No.	Party	Flag	Symbol	Leader	Seats contested
1.	Indian National Congress			Lal Thanhawla	40

=== National Democratic Alliance ===
No.	Party	Flag	Symbol	Leader	Seats contested
1.	Bharatiya Janata Party			Nitin Gadkari	17

=== Others ===
No.	Party	Flag	Symbol	Leader	Seats contested
1.	Zoram Nationalist Party			H. Lalrinmawia	38
2.	Nationalist Congress Party			Sharad Pawar	2
3.	Jai Maha Bharat Party				1

== Results ==
The result was declared on 9 December 2013. Indian National Congress won a large majority of 34 out of 40 seats. Mizo National Front and Mizoram People's Conference won five seats and one seat respectively. 81% of eligible voters turned out to vote.

Summary of results of the Mizoram Legislative Assembly election, 2013
Political Party	Flag	Seats Contested	Won	Net Change in seats	% of Seats	Votes	Vote %	Change in vote %
Indian National Congress		40	34	▲2	85.0	2,55,917	45.83	▲
Mizo National Front		31	5	▲2	12.5	1,64,305	28.65	▲
Mizoram People's Conference		8	1	▼1	2.5	35,269	32.02	▲
Bharatiya Janata Party		17	0	Steady	Steady	2,139	0.87	▼
		Total	40	Voters	5,73,417	Turnout	81%	

Summary of the 25 November 2013 Mizoram Legislative Assembly election results
Parties and coalitions	Popular vote			Seats	
Parties and coalitions	Votes	%	±pp	Won	+/−
Indian National Congress (INC)	255,917	44.3	▲5.4	34	▲2
Mizo National Front (MNF)	164,305	28.4	▼2.3	5	▲2
Zoram Nationalist Party (ZNP)	99,916	17.3	▲7.3	0	▼2
Mizoram People's Conference (MPC)	35,269	6.1	▼4.3	1	▼1
Maraland Democratic Front (MDF)	5,433	0.9	▲0.1	0	▼1
Nationalist Congress Party (NCP)	4,835	0.8	▲0.7	0	Steady
Bharatiya Janata Party (BJP)	2,139	0.37	▼0.07	0	Steady
Independents (IND)	1,764	0.3	▼7.4	0	Steady
Jai Maha Bharath Party (JMBP)	29	0.0	Steady	0	Steady
None of the Above (NOTA)	8,810	1.5	▲1.5	—N/a	—N/a
Total	573,417	100.00		40	±0

=== District wise results ===
District	Seats			
District	Seats	INC	MNF	MPC
Mamit	3	3	—N/a	—N/a
Kolasib	3	3	—N/a	—N/a
Aizawl	14	10	3	1
Champhai	5	5	—N/a	—N/a
Serchhip	3	2	1	—N/a
Lunglei	7	7	—N/a	—N/a
Lawngtlai	3	3	—N/a	—N/a
Saiha	2	1	1	—N/a
Total	40	34	5	1

== Constituency Wise Results ==
Constituency		Winner				Runner Up				Margin	%
#	Name	Candidate	Party	Votes	%	Candidate	Party	Votes	%	Margin	%
1	Hachhek (ST)	Lalrinmawia Ralte	INC	7,852	45.35	Saikapthianga	MNF	5,519	31.87	2,333	13.48
2	Dampa (ST)	Lalrobiaka	INC	6,172	43.27	Liansuama	MNF	5,011	35.13	1,161	8.14
3	Mamit (ST)	John Rotluangliana	INC	7,798	45.81	H.B. Lianmunga	MNF	5,308	31.19	2,490	14.62
4	Tuirial (ST)	Hmingdailova Khiangte	INC	5,119	39.12	Joseph L. Ralte	ZNP	4,880	37.30	239	1.82
5	Kolasib (ST)	P.C. Zoram Sangliana	INC	6,078	38.06	Lalchamliana	MNF	5,483	34.33	595	3.73
6	Serlui (ST)	K. Lalrinthanga	INC	5,664	40.52	Lalhmingliana	MNF	4,258	30.46	1,406	10.06
7	Tuivawl (ST)	R. L. Pianmawia	INC	5,668	45.41	Gogo Lalremtluanga	MNF	4,297	34.42	1,371	10.99
8	Chalfilh (ST)	Dr. Ngurdingliana	INC	7,174	50.84	L. T. Kima Fanai	MPC	3,446	24.42	3,728	26.42
9	Tawi (ST)	R Lalzirliana	INC	5,757	45.42	Lalmalsawmi	MNF	4,810	37.95	947	7.47
10	Aizawl North - I (ST)	R. Romawia	INC	5,970	37.08	Vanlalhlana	MPC	5,313	33.00	657	4.08
11	Aizawl North - II (ST)	Lalthanliana	MPC	6,875	41.53	H. Liansailova	INC	6,564	39.65	311	1.88
12	Aizawl North-III (ST)	Lal Thanzara	INC	6,262	45.48	Lalchhandama Ralte	MNF	5,512	40.03	750	5.45
13	Aizawl East - I	R. Lalrinawma	INC	6,221	37.72	Lalhmangaiha Sailo	MPC	5,799	35.16	422	2.56
14	Aizawl East II (ST)	Lalsawta	INC	4,992	38.31	Sailothanga Sailo	MNF	4,815	36.95	177	1.36
15	Aizawl West I (ST)	K Sangthuama	MNF	6,387	36.61	Tlangthanmawii	INC	5,925	33.96	462	2.65
16	Aizawl West II (ST)	Lalruatkima	MNF	6,575	43.47	Dr. Lalmalsawma Nghaka	INC	5,945	39.31	630	4.16
17	Aizawl West III (ST)	Vanlalzawma	MNF	5,765	37.99	R. Selthuama	INC	4,787	31.54	978	6.45
18	Aizawl South I (ST)	R. Vanlalvena	INC	6,463	39.59	R. K. Lianzuala	MNF	5,167	31.65	1,296	7.94
19	Aizawl South II (ST)	Lt. Col. Zosangzuala	INC	6,878	39.79	R. Tlanghmingthanga	MNF	5,835	33.76	1,043	6.03
20	Aizawl South-III (ST)	K. S. Thanga	INC	6,594	41.50	Tawnluia	MNF	5,927	37.30	667	4.20
21	Lengteng (ST)	H. Rohluna	INC	5,682	42.83	L. Thangmawia	MNF	5,515	41.57	167	1.26
22	Tuichang (ST)	Lalrinliana Sailo	INC	6,258	48.66	Dr. H. Lallungmuana	MNF	3,273	25.45	2,985	23.21
23	Champhai North (ST)	T.T. Zothansanga	INC	5,934	42.44	T.C. Kaphmingthanga	MNF	4,464	31.93	1,470	10.51
24	Champhai South (ST)	Jh. Rothuama	INC	5,203	40.99	Rosiamngheta	MPC	3,553	27.99	1,650	13.00
25	East Tuipui (ST)	T. Sangkunga	INC	4,926	43.37	Zoramthanga	MNF	4,128	36.34	798	7.03
26	Serchhip (ST)	Lal Thanhawla	INC	5,719	41.48	C. Lalramzauva	MNF	4,985	36.15	734	5.33
27	Tuikum (ST)	Er. Lalrinawma	MNF	4,467	35.53	K. Lianzuala	INC	4,453	35.42	14	0.11
28	Hrangturzo (ST)	Lal Thanhawla	INC	5,173	42.21	Lalthansanga	MPC	3,545	28.93	1,628	13.28
29	South Tuipui (ST)	John Siamkunga	INC	4,912	42.44	J. Lalchhuana	ZNP	3,344	28.89	1,568	13.55
30	Lunglei North (ST)	P.C. Lalthanliana	INC	6,168	47.15	Dr. K. Vanlallawma	MNF	5,298	40.50	870	6.65
31	Lunglei East (ST)	Joseph Lalhimpuia	INC	5,367	49.32	Lalrinzuala	MPC	3,756	34.52	1,611	14.80
32	Lunglei West (ST)	Chalrosanga Ralte	INC	5,174	46.27	Dr. R. Lalthangliana	MNF	5,080	45.43	94	0.84
33	Lunglei South (ST)	S. Laldingliana	INC	6,230	47.45	Dr. K Pachhunga	MNF	5,780	44.02	450	3.43
34	Thorang (ST)	Zodintluanga	INC	6,423	59.15	Joseph Lalzawmliana	MNF	3,919	36.09	2,504	23.06
35	West Tuipui (ST)	Nihar Kanti Chakma	INC	6,914	63.84	Priti Ranjan Chakma	MNF	3,580	33.06	3,334	30.78
36	Tuichawng (ST)	Buddha Dhan Chakma	INC	14,626	69.43	Rasik Mohan Chakma	MNF	5,900	28.01	8,726	41.42
37	Lawngtlai West (ST)	C. Ngunlianchunga	INC	10,323	52.72	C. Ramhluna	MNF	8,788	44.88	1,535	7.84
38	Lawngtlai East (ST)	H. Zothanglina	INC	8,191	48.65	Vanupa Zathang	MNF	7,918	47.03	273	1.62
39	Saiha (ST)	Dr. K. Beichhua	MNF	7,324	49.62	S. Hiato	INC	7,102	48.11	222	1.51
40	Palak (ST)	Hiphei	INC	7,256	56.86	Pp. Thawla	MDF	5,433	42.58	1,823	14.28
