= 1978 Mizoram Legislative Assembly election =

Legislative Assembly election in Mizoram, India

← 1972	17 and 20 May 1978	1979 →

All 30 seats in the Mizoram Legislative Assembly 16 seats needed for a majority
- Registered: 224,936
- Turnout: 63.27%
	Majority party	Minority party
Leader	T. Sailo
Party	MPC	Independent
Leader's seat	Aizawl North
Seats won	22	8
Popular vote	37.47%	62.53%
CM before election
C. Chhunga
Mizo Union
Elected CM
T. Sailo
MPC

Elections to the Mizoram Legislative Assembly were held in May 1978 to elect members of the 30 constituencies in Mizoram, India. The Mizoram People's Conference emerged as the single largest party and T. Sailo was appointed as the Chief Minister of Mizoram.

The previous ministry, led by Chief Minister C. Chhunga, resigned in May 1977, to facilitate the progress of peace talks (Mizoram Peace Accord). The Union Territory was therefore placed under President's rule, for a year.

== Parties Contested ==
No.	Party	Flag	Symbol	Leader	Seats contested
1.	Mizoram People's Conference			T. Sailo	28
2.	Independents			collective leadership	126

== Result ==
Party	Votes	%	Seats	+/–
Mizoram People's Conference	52,640	37.47	22	▲22
Independents	87,830	62.53	8	▼16
Total	140,470	100.00	30	0
Valid votes	140,470	98.71		
Invalid/blank votes	1,838	1.29		
Total votes	142,308	100.00		
Registered voters/turnout	224,936	63.27		
Source: ECI

== Elected members ==
#	Constituency	Reserved for (ST/None)	Candidate	Party
1	Tuipang	ST	Hiphei	Independent
2	Sangau	ST	K. Sangchhum	Independent
3	Saiha	ST	R.T. Zachono	Independent
4	Chawngte	ST	Kistomohan	Independent
5	Demagiri	None	Harikristo	Independent
6	Buarpui	ST	K. Lalsanga	Mizoram People's Conference
7	Lunglei	ST	Lalhmingthanga	Mizoram People's Conference
8	Tawipui	ST	H. Kiautuma	Mizoram People's Conference
9	Hnahthial	ST	R. Romawia	Mizoram People's Conference
10	N. Vanlaiphai	None	J.H. Rothuama	Mizoram People's Conference
11	Khawbung	ST	J. Kapthianga	Mizoram People's Conference
12	Champhai	ST	Lalthanhawla	Independent
13	Khawhai	ST	Vanlalhruaia	Mizoram People's Conference
14	Saitual	ST	K.M. Baiksailova	Mizoram People's Conference
15	Ngopa	ST	P.B.Rosanga	Mizoram People's Conference
16	Suangpuilawn	ST	F. Malsawma	Mizoram People's Conference
17	Ratu	ST	J. Thankunga	Mizoram People's Conference
18	Kawnpui	ST	Kenneth Chawngliana	Mizoram People's Conference
19	Kolasib	ST	Chawngkunga	Mizoram People's Conference
20	Kawrthah	ST	C. Vulluaia	Mizoram People's Conference
21	Sairang	ST	Tlangchhunga	Mizoram People's Conference
22	Phuldungsei	None	P. Lalupa	Mizoram People's Conference
23	Sateek	ST	Lalthanzauva	Mizoram People's Conference
24	Serchhip	ST	Thanmawii	Mizoram People's Conference
25	Lungpho	ST	K. Baikchungnunga	Mizoram People's Conference
26	Tlungvel	ST	C. L. Ruala	Independent
27	Aizawl North	ST	Thengphunga Sailo	Mizoram People's Conference
28	Aizawl East	ST	Thangridema	Mizoram People's Conference
29	Aizawl West	ST	Zairemthanga	Mizoram People's Conference
30	Aizawl South	ST	Sainghaka	Independent

== See also ==
- List of constituencies of the Mizoram Legislative Assembly
