= List of constituencies of the Mizoram Legislative Assembly =

Mizoram Legislative Assembly
- 9th Mizoram Assembly

Type
- Type: Unicameral
- Term limits: 5 years
- Seats: 40

Elections
- Voting system: First past the post
- Last election: 2023
- Next election: 2028

Meeting place
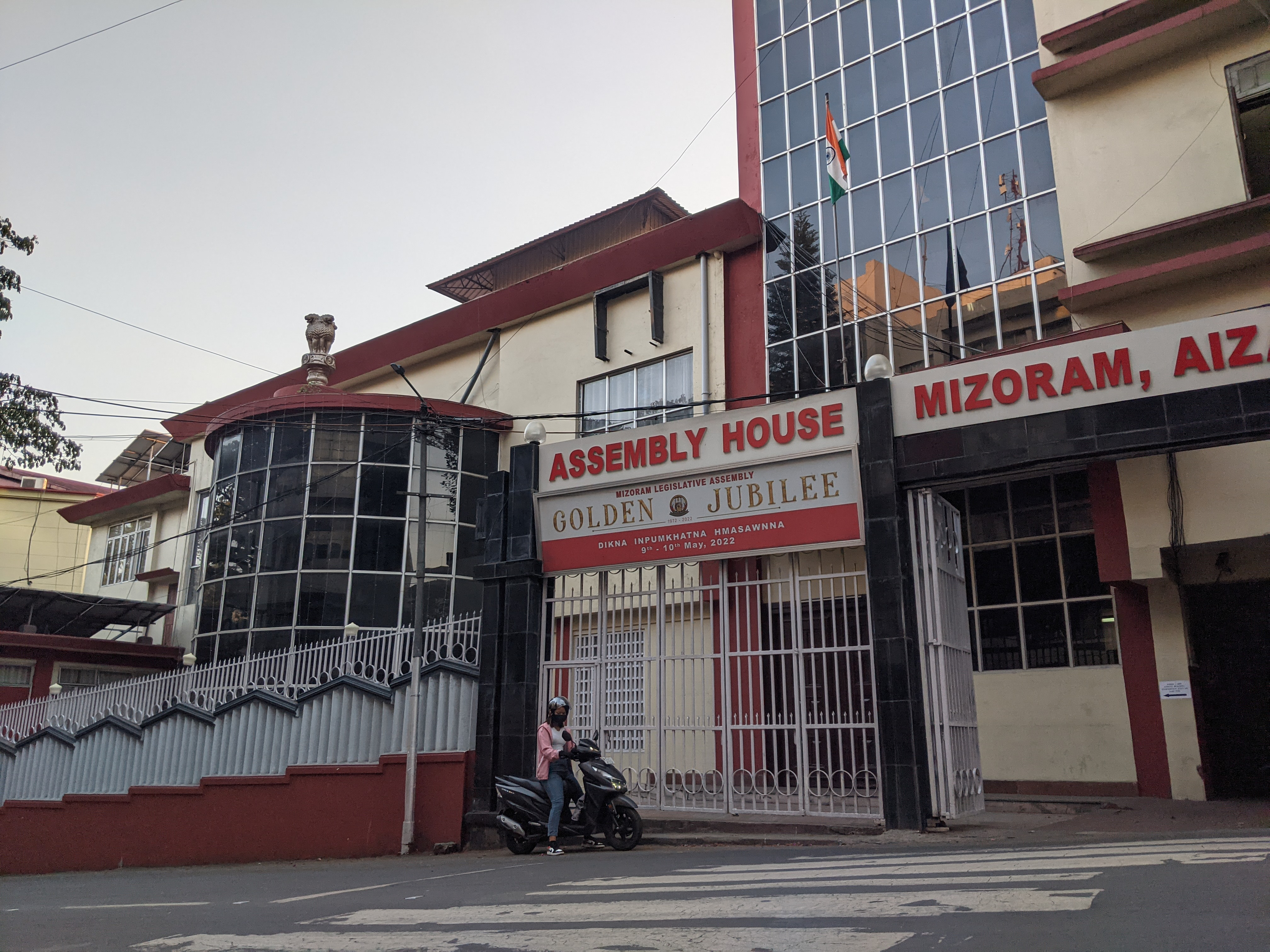
- Legislative Assembly House, Aizawl, Mizoram, India – 796001

Website
- www.mizoramassembly.in

Location of Mizoram (highlighted in red) within India

The Mizoram Legislative Assembly is the unicameral legislature of Mizoram state in Northeast India. The seat of the legislative assembly is at Aizawl, the capital of the state. The assembly comprises 40 members directly elected from single-seat constituencies. It sits for a term of five years, unless it is dissolved early. Early dissolution of state assemblies happens when the governing party (or alliance) loses confidence of the assembly. This leads to either the President's Rule being imposed on the state, or early elections being called. Mizoram is the fourth-smallest state in India, covering 21,081 km^{2} (8,139 sq mi); and the second-least populous state with a population of 1.10 million. The Mizoram Legislative Assembly has existed since 1972, when it had 30 constituencies.

Since the independence of India, the Scheduled Castes (SC) and Scheduled Tribes (ST) have been given reservation status, guaranteeing political representation, and the Constitution lays down the general principles of positive discrimination for STs and SCs. The 2011 census of India stated that the indigenous population constitutes 95% of the state's total population. The Scheduled Tribes have been granted a reservation of 39 seats in the Mizoram assembly, leaving only one (Aizawl East-I) unreserved.

== History ==
Mizoram became a Union Territory of India in 1972, at which time it was assigned a 30-member legislative assembly and it had its first election. In 1986, after the Mizoram Peace Accord was signed, the 53rd Amendment to the Constitution of India was passed. Mizoram was officially converted into a state in February 1987, and the number of constituencies for its legislative assembly was increased to 40.

Changes in the constituencies of the Mizoram Legislative Assembly over time
Year	Act/Order	Effect	Assembly Seats			Election(s)
Year	Act/Order	Effect	Total	General	ST	Election(s)
1971	North-Eastern Areas (Reorganisation) Act	Assam state's Mizo hills area was converted into the separate Union Territory of Mizoram.	30	30	0	1972
1976			30	3	27	1978
1978			30	30	0	1979, 1984
1986	Mizoram Peace Accord	Mizoram was given full statehood after the Mizoram Peace Accord, and the number of seats in the legislative assembly was increased to 40.	40	2	38	1987
1987		There was an increase in the number of seats reserved for Scheduled Tribes.	40	1	39	1989, 1993, 1998, 2003,
2008	Delimitation of Parliamentary and Assembly Constituencies Order, 2008	There were changes in the reservation status and area covered by constituencies.	40	1	39	2008, 2013, 2018, 2023

== Constituencies ==
Constituencies of the Mizoram Legislative Assembly

The constituencies of the Mizoram Legislative Assembly were last delimited in 2008.

Reservation
Scheduled Tribes (ST)

Constituencies of the Mizoram Legislative Assembly
#	Name	Reserved (ST/None)	District	Lok Sabha constituency	Electorate (2023)	Ref.
1	Hachhek	ST	Mamit	Mizoram	21,160	
2	Dampa	ST	Mamit	Mizoram	20,090	
3	Mamit	ST	Mamit	Mizoram	23,932	
4	Tuirial	ST	Kolasib	Mizoram	18,498	
5	Kolasib	ST	Kolasib	Mizoram	24,096	
6	Serlui	ST	Kolasib	Mizoram	21,265	
7	Tuivawl	ST	Aizawl	Mizoram	17,997	
8	Chalfilh	ST	Saitual	Mizoram	20,133	
9	Tawi	ST	Saitual	Mizoram	17,300	
10	Aizawl North 1	ST	Aizawl	Mizoram	27,009	
11	Aizawl North 2	ST	Aizawl	Mizoram	24,625	
12	Aizawl North 3	ST	Aizawl	Mizoram	20,569	
13	Aizawl East 1	None	Aizawl	Mizoram	29,044	
14	Aizawl East 2	ST	Aizawl	Mizoram	19,166	
15	Aizawl West 1	ST	Aizawl	Mizoram	29,932	
16	Aizawl West 2	ST	Aizawl	Mizoram	22,900	
17	Aizawl West 3	ST	Aizawl	Mizoram	23,677	
18	Aizawl South 1	ST	Aizawl	Mizoram	23,066	
19	Aizawl South 2	ST	Aizawl	Mizoram	27,933	
20	Aizawl South 3	ST	Aizawl	Mizoram	22,631	
21	Lengteng	ST	Saitual	Mizoram	18,767	
22	Tuichang	ST	Khawzawl	Mizoram	17,605	
23	Champhai North	ST	Champhai	Mizoram	20,220	
24	Champhai South	ST	Champhai	Mizoram	21,531	
25	East Tuipui	ST	Champhai	Mizoram	15,910	
26	Serchhip	ST	Serchhip	Mizoram	20,844	
27	Tuikum	ST	Serchhip	Mizoram	17,055	
28	Hrangturzo	ST	Serchhip	Mizoram	16,780	
29	South Tuipui	ST	Hnahthial	Mizoram	16,348	
30	Lunglei North	ST	Lunglei	Mizoram	17,867	
31	Lunglei East	ST	Lunglei	Mizoram	16,327	
32	Lunglei West	ST	Lunglei	Mizoram	15,686	
33	Lunglei South	ST	Lunglei	Mizoram	19,050	
34	Thorang	ST	Lunglei	Mizoram	14,955	
35	West Tuipui	ST	Lunglei	Mizoram	16,793	
36	Tuichawng	ST	Lawngtlai	Mizoram	36,191	
37	Lawngtlai West	ST	Lawngtlai	Mizoram	29,542	
38	Lawngtlai East	ST	Lawngtlai	Mizoram	25,937	
39	Saiha	ST	Saiha	Mizoram	24,197	
40	Palak	ST	Saiha	Mizoram	20,435	
