= Mizo People's Conference (Progressive) =

Defunct political party of India

Mizo People's Conference (Progressive) was a political party in the Indian state of Mizoram. MPC(P) was formed on 19 December 2003 as a split from the Mizoram People's Conference, one of the oldest parties in Mizoram which was formed in 1972. The party was led by a two time member of the Mizoram assembly F. Lalthanzuala. He was elected as an MLA of Mizoram People's Conference (MZPC_ party from Hnahthial Assembly constituency in 1998 and 2003.

On 16 April 2004 MPC (P) merged with Mizo National Front.
