= 1979 Mizoram Legislative Assembly election =

Legislative Assembly election in Mizoram, India

← 1978	24 and 27 April 1979	1984 →

All 30 seats in the Mizoram Legislative Assembly 16 seats needed for a majority
- Registered: 241944
- Turnout: 68.34%
	Majority party	Minority party	Third party
Leader	T. Sailo
Party	MPC	INC(I)	JP
Leader's seat	Aizawl North
Seats before	22	not contested	not contested
Seats won	18	5	2
Seat change	▼4	not contested	not contested
Popular vote	32.67%	23.88%	13.09%
CM before election
T. Sailo
MPC
Elected CM
T. Sailo
MPC

Elections to the Mizoram Legislative Assembly were held in April 1979 to elect members of the 30 constituencies in Mizoram, India. The Mizoram People's Conference emerged as the single largest party and T. Sailo was appointed as the Chief Minister of Mizoram for the second time.

Chief Minister Sailo's refusal to grant undue favours caused dissension in his party which led to the fall of his previous government and imposition of President's rule in the Union Territory.

== Parties Contested ==
No.	Party	Flag	Symbol	Leader	Seats contested
1.	Janata Party			Chandra Shekhar	30
2.	Mizoram People's Conference			T. Sailo	27
3.	Indian National Congress (I)			Indira Gandhi	25
4.	Independents			collective leadership	68

== Result ==
Party	Votes	%	Seats	+/–
Mizoram People's Conference	53,515	32.67	18	▼4
Indian National Congress (I)	39,115	23.88	5	New
Janata Party	21,435	13.09	2	New
Independents	49,733	30.36	5	▼3
Total	163,798	100.00	30	0
Valid votes	163,798	99.06		
Invalid/blank votes	1,546	0.94		
Total votes	165,344	100.00		
Registered voters/turnout	241,944	68.34		
Source: ECI

== Elected members ==
#	Constituency	Candidate	Party
1	Tuipang	Hiphei	Janata Party
2	Sangau	H. Rammawi	Mizoram People's Conference
3	Saiha	S. Vadyu	Janata Party
4	Chawngte	Sneha Kumar	Independent
5	Demagiri	Hari Kristo Chakma	Indian National Congress (I)
6	Buarpui	K. Lalsanga	Mizoram People's Conference
7	Lunglei	Lalhmingthanga	Mizoram People's Conference
8	Tawipui	B. Lalchungunga	Mizoram People's Conference
9	Hnahthiaal	Ellis Saidenga	Mizoram People's Conference
10	N. Vanlaiphai	Ngurchhina	Independent
11	Khawbung	J. Ngurdawla	Mizoram People's Conference
12	Champhai	Lalthanhawla	Indian National Congress (I)
13	Khawhai	J. H. Routhuama	Independent
14	Saitual	L. Piandenga	Mizoram People's Conference
15	Ngopa	P. B. Rosanga	Mizoram People's Conference
16	Suanpuilawn	F. Malsawma	Mizoram People's Conference
17	Ratu	J. Thankunga	Mizoram People's Conference
18	Kawnpui	Kenneth Chawngliana	Mizoram People's Conference
19	Kolasib	C. Chawngkunga	Mizoram People's Conference
20	Kawrthah	Saikapthianga	Indian National Congress (I)
21	Saisang	C. Vulluaia	Mizoram People's Conference
22	Phuldungsei	P. Lalupa	Independent
23	Sateek	Lalthanzauva	Independent
24	Serchhip	Bualhranga	Mizoram People's Conference
25	Lungpo	K. Biakchungnunga	Mizoram People's Conference
26	Tlungvel	C. L. Ruala	Indian National Congress (I)
27	Aizawl North	Thenphunga Sailo	Mizoram People's Conference
28	Aizawl East	Thanmawii	Mizoram People's Conference
29	Aizawl West	Zairemthanga	Mizoram People's Conference
30	Aizawl South	Sainghaka	Indian National Congress (I)

== See also ==
- List of constituencies of the Mizoram Legislative Assembly
