= Chief Minister of Mizoram =

Leader of the executive branch of Government of Mizoram

- Emblem of Mizoram

- Flag of India

- Incumbent; Lalduhoma since 8 December 2023
- Chief Minister's Office; Government of Mizoram
- Style: The Honourable (formal); Mr. Chief Minister (informal)
- Type: Leader of the Executive
- Status: Head of government
- Abbreviation: CMoMizoram
- Member of: Legislative Assembly; State Cabinet
- Reports to: Governor of Mizoram; Mizoram Legislative Assembly
- Seat: Aizawl
- Nominator: MLAs of the majority party or alliance
- Appointer: Governor of Mizoram; by convention based on appointees ability to command confidence in the Legislative Assembly
- Term length: At the confidence of the assembly; Chief minister's term is for five years and is subject to no term limits.
- Inaugural holder: C. Chhunga
- Formation: 3 May 1972 (54 years ago)
- Deputy: Deputy Chief Minister of Mizoram
- Salary: 120,000 (US$1,300)
- Website: https://cmonline.mizoram.gov.in/

The chief minister of Mizoram is the chief executive of the Indian state of Mizoram. As per the Constitution of India, the governor is a state's de jure head, but de facto executive authority rests with the chief minister. Following elections to the Mizoram Legislative Assembly, the state's governor usually invites the party (or coalition) with a majority of seats to form the government. The governor appoints the chief minister, whose council of ministers are collectively responsible to the assembly. Given that he has the confidence of the assembly, the chief minister's term is for five years and is subject to no term limits. Chief Minister also serves as Leader of the House in the Legislative Assembly.

Since 1972, five people from four parties have served as chief minister of Mizoram; the inaugural officeholder was Ch. Chhunga. Lal Thanhawla of the Indian National Congress has the longest incumbency of over 21 years in 5 terms. The current incumbent is Lalduhoma of the Zoram People's Movement who assumed office on 8 December 2023.

== History ==
Before Indian independence, the Lushai Hills district and the subsequent Mizo district were ruled by a Superintendent of the Lushai Hills. After Indian independence, the democratic change in the administrative setup of Mizoram led to an anti-chief movement. The feeling was widespread against the autocratic chiefs and for the Mizo Union. In 1955, at a meeting of representatives of various Mizo villages held in Aizawl, the demand arose for a separate hills state. The local people felt they had been ill-served by the Assam Government during the Mautam famine.

When in 1960 the government introduced Assamese as the official language of the state, there were many protests against the Official Language Act of 1961. That was followed by the March 1966 Mizo National Front uprising, resulting in attacks on the military installations in Aizawl, Lunglei and other towns. The Mizo National Front, formerly known as Mizo National Famine Front, declared independence from India.

The Indian government designated Mizoram as a union territory on 21 January 1972. Pu Laldenga, the president of the Mizo National Front, signed a peace accord in 1986 with the Government of India, stating Mizoram was an integral part of India. Pu Laldenga came to the ministry in the interim government, which was formed in coalition with Congress in 1987. The statehood of Mizoram was proclaimed on 20 February 1987.

== Oath as the state chief minister ==
The chief minister serves five years in the office. The following is the oath of the Deputy chief minister of state:

I, <Name of Chief Minister>, do swear in the name of God/solemnly affirm that I will bear true faith and allegiance to the Constitution of India as by law established, that I will uphold the sovereignty and integrity of India, that I will faithfully and conscientiously discharge my duties as a Minister for the State of () and that I will do right to all manner of people in accordance with the Constitution and the law without fear or favour, affection or ill-will.

Oath of Secrecy

"I, [Name], do swear in the name of God / solemnly affirm that I will not directly or indirectly communicate or reveal to any person or persons any matter which shall be brought under my consideration or shall become known to me as a Minister for the State of [Name of State] except as may be required for the due discharge of my duties as such Minister.Oath of Office (Rinawmna Thutiam) "Kei, [Name of CM] hian, Pathian hmingin chhe ka vaanchia / thutak hriatpuiah ka vaia (or: rinawmna nena ka sawi thlang e), ram Danpui, Constitution of India nupui lehzual leh dik taka ka zah ang a, ka vawng nget tlat ang tih ka tiam a.

India ram thuneihna sang ber leh pumkhatna, Sovereignty and Integrity of India chu ka humhalh tlat ang a.

Chuan, Mizoram State Chief Minister hna leh ka duties te hi rinawm tak leh ka chhia leh tha hriatna dik tak hmangin, faithfully and conscientiously ka thawk ang tih ka tiam bawk e.

Mi tupawh, an dinhmun engpawh lo ni se—huatna emaw, duhsak bikna emaw (fear or favour, affection or ill-will) awm miah loin, Danpui leh a behbawm hna te hi dik takin ka kengkawh vek ang." B. Oath of Secrecy (Thurûk Vawn Rinawmna Thutiam) "Kei, [Name of CM] hian, Pathian hmingin chhe ka vaanchia / thutak hriatpuiah ka vaia (or: rinawmna nena ka sawi thlang e), Mizoram State-a Minister ka nihna anga ka hnathawh puala matter lo lang apiang leh ka hriat tura rawn chhawp chhuah reng reng te chu, mi dang hnenah ka puang chhuak lo ang a, ka hrilh ru dawn lo bawk (directly or indirectly communicate or reveal) tih ka tiam e. Mahse, ka Minister hna tha taka ka thawh nana thil disclose ngai a nih erawh chuan a dan anga kalpui a ni ang."

== Chief Ministers of Mizoram (1972-present) ==
- ^{†} Died in office
- ^{§} Returned to office after a previous non-consecutive term

#	Portrait	Chief Minister (Birth-Death) Constituency	Election	Term of office			Political party	Ministry
#	Portrait	Chief Minister (Birth-Death) Constituency	Election	From	To	Period	Political party	Ministry
Union territory of Mizoram (1972–1987)
1		C. Chhunga (1915–1988); MLA for Kolasib	1972 (1st)	3 May 1972	10 May 1977	5 years, 7 days	Mizo Union	Chhunga
Position vacant (11 May 1977 – 1 June 1978); President's rule was imposed during this period (Note: When President's rule is in force in a state, its council of ministers stands dissolved. The office of chief minister thus lies vacant. At times, the legislative assembly also stands dissolved.)
2		Brigadier; Ṭhenphunga Sailo AVSM (1922–2015); MLA for Aizawl North	1978 (2nd)	2 June 1978	10 November 1978	161 days	Mizoram People's Conference	Sailo I
Position vacant (10 November 1978 – 8 May 1979); President's rule was imposed during this period
(2)		Brigadier; Ṭhenphunga Sailo AVSM (1922–2015); MLA for Aizawl North	1979 (3rd)	8 May 1979^{[§]}	4 May 1984	4 years, 362 days	Mizoram People's Conference	Sailo II
3		Lal Thanhawla (born 1938); MLA for Serchhip	1984 (4th)	5 May 1984	20 August 1986	2 years, 107 days	Indian National Congress	Lal Thanhawla I
4		Laldenga (1927–1990); MLA for Aizawl North II	1984 (4th)	21 August 1986	19 February 1987	182 days	Mizo National Front	Laldenga I
State of Mizoram (1987–present)
(4)		Laldenga (1927–1990); MLA for Aizawl North II	1987 (5th)	20 February 1987	7 September 1988	1 year, 200 days	Mizo National Front	Laldenga II
Position vacant (7 September 1988 – 24 January 1989); President's rule was imposed during this period
(3)		Lal Thanhawla (born 1938); MLA for Serchhip	1989 (6th)	24 January 1989^{[§]}	8 December 1993	9 years, 313 days	Indian National Congress	Lal Thanhawla II
(3)		Lal Thanhawla (born 1938); MLA for Serchhip	1993 (7th)	8 December 1993	3 December 1998	9 years, 313 days	Indian National Congress	Lal Thanhawla III
5		Zoramthanga (born 1944); MLA for Champhai	1998 (8th)	3 December 1998	4 December 2003	10 years, 8 days	Mizo National Front	Zoramthanga I
5		Zoramthanga (born 1944); MLA for Champhai	2003 (9th)	4 December 2003	11 December 2008	10 years, 8 days	Mizo National Front	Zoramthanga II
(3)		Lal Thanhawla (born 1938); MLA for Serchhip	2008 (10th)	11 December 2008^{[§]}	14 December 2013	10 years, 3 days	Indian National Congress	Lal Thanhawla IV
(3)		Lal Thanhawla (born 1938); MLA for Serchhip	2013 (11th)	14 December 2013	14 December 2018	10 years, 3 days	Indian National Congress	Lal Thanhawla V
5		Zoramthanga (born 1944); MLA for Aizawl East 1	2018 (12th)	14 December 2018^{[§]}	7 December 2023	4 years, 358 days	Mizo National Front	Zoramthanga III
6		Lalduhoma; IPS (Retd.) (born 1949); MLA for Serchhip	2023 (13th)	8 December 2023	Incumbent	2 years, 349 days	Zoram People's Movement	Lalduhoma

== Statistics ==
=== List by chief minister ===
#	Chief Minister	Party	Term of office	
#	Chief Minister	Party	Longest continuous term	Total duration of chief ministership
1	Lal Thanhawla	INC	10 years, 3 days	22 years, 58 days
2	Zoramthanga	MNF	10 years, 8 days	15 years, 0 days
3	T. Sailo	MPC	4 years, 362 days	5 years, 158 days
4	C. Chhunga	MU	5 years, 7 days	5 years, 7 days
5	Lalduhoma	ZPM	2 years, 349 days	2 years, 349 days
6	Laldenga	MNF	2 years, 17 days	2 years, 17 days

== See also ==
- List of governors of Mizoram
- List of chief secretaries of Mizoram
- List of superintendents of Mizoram

== Notes ==
Footnotes
