= 1987 Mizoram Legislative Assembly election =

Legislative Assembly election in Mizoram, India

- 16 February 1987

All 40 seats in the Mizoram Legislative Assembly 21 seats needed for a majority
- Registered: 322,066
- Turnout: 74.80%

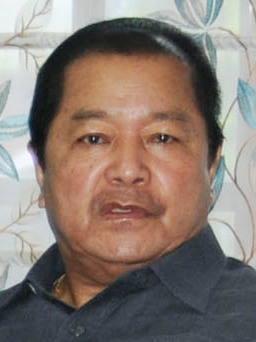

	Majority party	Minority party	Third party
Leader	Laldenga	Lal Thanhawla
Party	MNF	INC	MPC
Leader's seat	Aizawl North 2	Serchhip	Buarpi
Seats before		20	8
Seats won	24	13	3
Seat change		▼7	▼5
Popular vote	43.31%	32.99%	23.70%
CM before election
Laldenga
MNF
Elected CM
Laldenga
MNF

Elections to the Mizoram Legislative Assembly were held in February 1987 to elect members of the 40 constituencies in Mizoram, India. Although designated as Independents, the Mizo National Front won the majority of seats. Its leader, Laldenga was appointed as the Chief Minister of Mizoram.

One of the conditions of the Mizoram Peace Accord was the conversion of Mizoram from a Union Territory to a state. This was achieved through the State of Mizoram Act, 1986 by which, the seats in the Legislative Assembly were increased from thirty to forty.

== Result ==
Party	Votes	%	Seats	+/–
Independents (Note: Independents included the winning Mizo National Front candidates)	99,996	43.31	24	▲22
Indian National Congress	76,152	32.99	13	▼7
Mizoram People's Conference	54,717	23.70	3	▼5
Total	230,865	100.00	40	▲10
Valid votes	230,865	98.85		
Invalid/blank votes	2,691	1.15		
Total votes	233,556	100.00		
Registered voters/turnout	322,066	72.52		
Source: ECI

== Elected members ==
#	Constituency	Candidate	Party
1	Tuipang	Hiphei	Indian National Congress
2	Saiha	S. Hiato	Indian National Congress
3	Sangau	H. Rammawi	Mizoram People’s Conference
4	Lawngtlai	F. Lalramliana	Indian National Congress
5	Chawngte	Nirupam Chakma	Indian National Congress
6	Tlabung	Harikristo	Indian National Congress
7	Buarpui	P. Lalbiaka	Indian National Congress
8	Lunglei South	H. Lalruata	Independent
9	Lunglei North	L. Ngurchhina	Independent
10	Tawipui	Siamliana	Independent
11	Vanva	K. Thanfianga	Independent
12	Hnahthial	Vanlalnghaka	Indian National Congress
13	North Vanlaiphai	Lalrinmawia	Independent
14	Khawbung	K. Vanlalauva	Independent
15	Champhai	Zoramthanga	Independent
16	Khawhai	R. Lalawia	Independent
17	Saitual	Andrew L. Herliana	Independent
18	Khawzawl	Tawnluia	Independent
19	Ngopa	Zosiama Pachuau	Mizoram People’s Conference
20	Suangpuilawn	Vanlalngena	Indian National Congress
21	Ratu	Lalrinchhana	Independent
22	Kawnpui	Lalkhawnghma	Independent
23	Kolasib	Aichhinga	Independent
24	Bilkhawthlir	Vanlalhruaia	Independent
25	Lokicherra	J. Thanghuama	Independent
26	Kawrthah	Saikapthianga	Indian National Congress
27	Mamit	K. Zahungliana	Independent
28	Phuldungsei	Liansuama	Indian National Congress
29	Sateek	Laldenga	Independent
30	Serchhip	Lalthanhawla	Indian National Congress
31	Lungpho	K. L. Lianchia	Mizoram People’s Conference
32	Tlungvel	P. C. Zoramsangliana	Indian National Congress
33	Aizawl North 1	Lalhlimpuii	Independent
34	Aizawl North 2	Laldenga	Independent
35	Aizawl East 1	Saingura Sailo	Independent
36	Aizawl East 2	Rokamlova	Indian National Congress
37	Aizawl West 1	H. Hrangdawla	Independent
38	Aizawl West 2	Rualchhina	Independent
39	Aizawl South 1	R. Tlanghmingthanga	Independent
40	Aizawl South 2	Chawngzuala	Independent

== See also ==
- List of constituencies of the Mizoram Legislative Assembly
