= Kenneth Chawngliana =

Zoram People's Movement politician from Mizoram

Kenneth Chawgliana
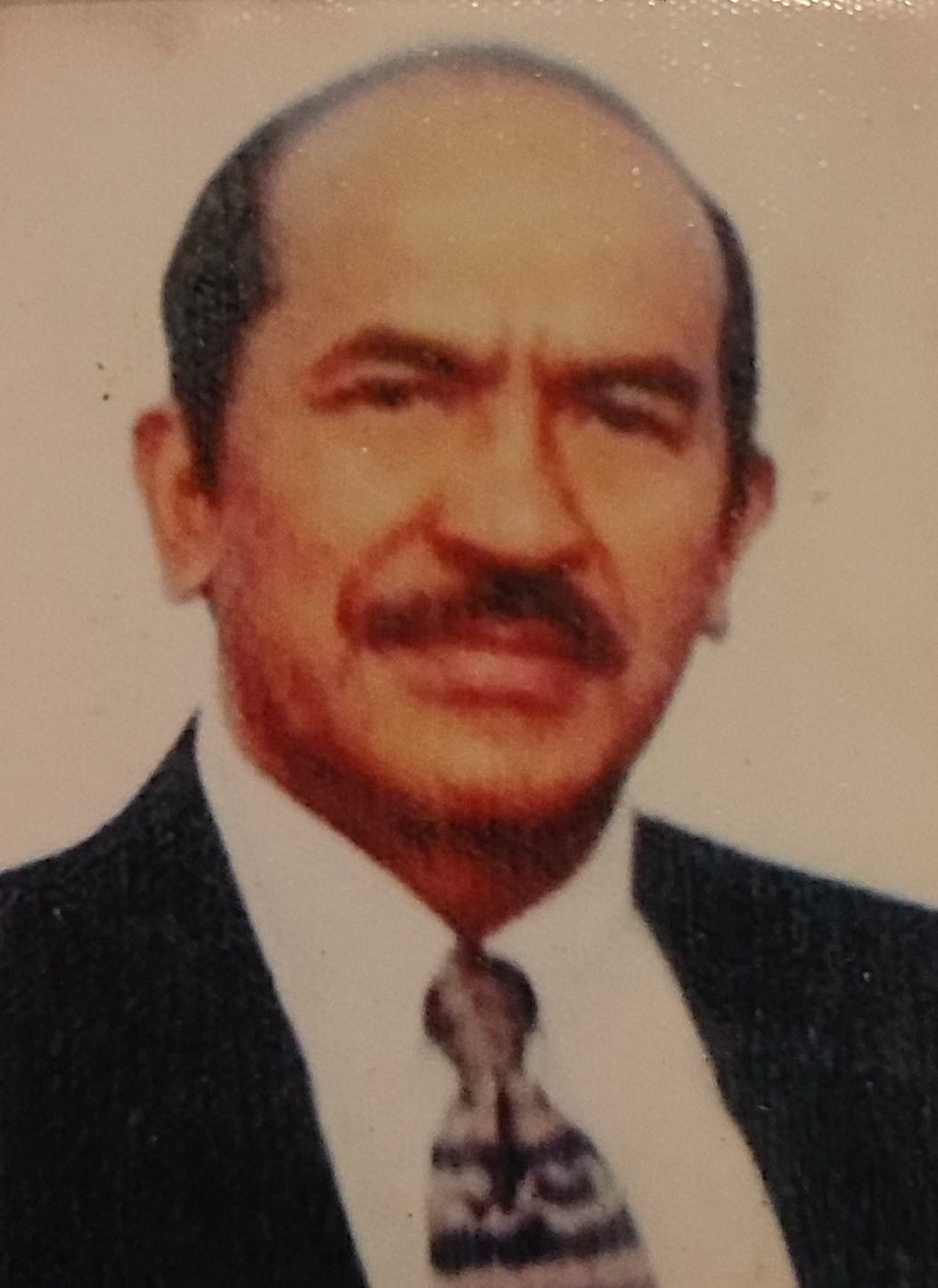

Speaker of the Mizoram Legislative Assembly
- In office 25 May 1979 – 8 May 1984
- Preceded by: Pu Thangridema
- Succeeded by: H.Thansanga

Personal details
- Born: 1946 (age 79–80) Hliappui
- Party: Mizoram People's Conference; Zoram People's Movement
- Spouse: P Lalzawnthangi
- Parents: C Hrangchhunga (father); Darhnuaii (mother)
- Education: Savitribai Phule Pune University (PhD)
- Occupation: Politician

Kenneth Chawngliana is a Zoram People's Movement politician and current vice chairman of the Mizoram State Planning board. He was the fourth Speaker of Mizoram Legislative Assembly. He had been elected in Mizoram Legislative Assembly elected 1979 to 1984 from Kawnpui as candidate of Mizo People's Conference.

== Career ==
He was the founder Principal of Hrangbana College from 21 July 1980 to 31 March 1982 and Government Kolasib College from 1 July 1978 to 10 January 1981. He was speaker of Mizoram Legislative Assembly from 25 May 1979 to 8 May 1984. He left the Mizoram People's Conference party in 2016 and joined the Zoram Nationalist Party. He is at present the Vice president of Zoram People's Movement. He has also served as a member of the Mizoram public Service commission.He was appointed as Vice Chairman of the Mizoram State Planning Board on 13 December 2023.

== Education ==
He has completed his Ph.D. from Gokhale Institute of Politics and Economics, Savitribai Phule Pune University in 1979.

== Books ==
He has written one book:

- Nupa Hlimna Thuruk
