= Pu Zoduha =

Indian politician

Pu Zoduha (20 January 1940 – 20 June 2013) was an Indian politician. He was a nominated member of the Mizoram Legislative Assembly from 1984 to 1987. He is 2nd MLA ever to represent the Bru/Reang Community in Mizoram.

== Death ==
Zoduha died of complications from hypertension and diabetes on 20 June 2013 at the age of 73.
