= Samthang =

Samthang Old Samthang
- Village
- Location in Mizoram, India Samthang (India)
- Coordinates: 23.160963°N 93.2518769°E
- Country: India
- State: Mizoram
- District: Champhai
- Block: Khawbung
- Elevation: 1,579 m (5,180 ft)

Population (2011)
  - Total: 908
- Time zone: UTC+5:30 (IST)
- PIN: 796321
- 2011 census code: 271366

Samthang is a village in the Champhai district of Mizoram, India. It is located in the Khawbung R.D. Block.

== Demographics ==
According to the 2011 census of India, Samthang (old) has 190 households. The effective literacy rate (i.e. the literacy rate of population excluding children aged 6 and below) is 98.62%.

Demographics (2011 Census)
	Total	Male	Female
Population	908	463	445
Children aged below 6 years	111	59	52
Scheduled caste	0	0	0
Scheduled tribe	902	459	443
Literates	786	397	389
Workers (all)	510	257	253
Main workers (total)	496	252	244
Main workers: Cultivators	418	205	213
Main workers: Agricultural labourers	2	1	1
Main workers: Household industry workers	4	4	0
Main workers: Other	72	42	30
Marginal workers (total)	14	5	9
Marginal workers: Cultivators	7	3	4
Marginal workers: Agricultural labourers	0	0	0
Marginal workers: Household industry workers	1	1	0
Marginal workers: Others	6	1	5
Non-workers	398	206	192
