= T. Sailo =

Indian military officer and politician

Brigadier T. Sailo AVSM

2nd Chief Minister of Mizoram
- In office 8 May 1979 – 4 May 1984
- Lieutenant Governor: N. P. Mathur; Sourendra Nath Kohli; H. S. Dubey
- Preceded by: Ch. Chhunga
- Succeeded by: Lal Thanhawla
- Constituency: Aizawl West II
- In office 2 June 1978 – 10 November 1978
- Lieutenant Governor: N. P. Mathur
- Preceded by: President's Rule
- Succeeded by: President's Rule

Personal details
- Born: 1 January 1922 Melkhat/Ṭhuampui, Lunglei, Bengal Presidency, British India
- Died: 27 March 2015 (aged 93) Aizawl, Mizoram, India
- Resting place: Kanan Veng, Aizawl; 23°43′53″N 92°42′30″E
- Party: Mizoram People's Conference
- Spouse: Thansiami
- Children: 4
- Education: University of Calcutta

Military service
- Allegiance: British India; India
- Branch/service: British Indian Army; Indian Army
- Years of service: 1942-1974
- Rank: Brigadier
- Unit: Punjab Regiment; Assam Regiment
- Battles/wars: World War II; Burma campaign
- Awards: Padma Shri; Ati Vishisht Seva Medal

Brigadier Ṭhenphunga Sailo, AVSM (1 January 1922 – 27 March 2015) was an Indian military officer and politician who served as the 2nd Chief Minister of Mizoram. He founded the Mizoram People's Conference, one of the major political parties in Mizoram. He was a recipient of Ati Vishisht Seva Medal and Padma Shri for his military service and humanitarian works, and the Mizo Award for his lifetime achievements.

Sailo was the son of Vanchheuva, a Mizo chief of Ṭhuampui village at Lunglei district. He studied at Serkawn Middle English School, Shillong High School (in Meghalaya), and Serampore College in Calcutta (now Kolkata). He earned his certificate of Intermediate of Science (higher secondary level) from the University of Calcutta. He immediately joined the British Indian Army to serve in World War II. Recruited as a second lieutenant in 1942, he became the first military officer among the Mizo people. He retired with the rank lr Brigadier in 1974. By then his native state was ravaged by political insurgency, and he soon set to humanitarian works and established the Human Rights Committee, which he developed into a recognized political party named the People's Conference (later renamed the Mizo People's Conference) in 1975.

Sailo led his new party to victory in the Mizoram Legislative Assembly election in 1978, and he became the second Chief Minister. Re-election the next year brought him another victory, and he remained the Chief Minister till 1984. Though he was elected for an MLA seat in the 1984 election, his party was overwhelmed that year by the Mizoram Congress party (under the Indian National Congress Party). He was then appointed the Opposition Leader in the legislative assembly. He was subsequently elected in 1998 and 2008, but failed to recover his party. He retired from politics in 2013 at age 91, at which time he was the oldest elected legislator.

== Early life and education ==
Sailo was born to Mizo Chief Vancheuva and his wife Hrangvungi. He completed his elementary schooling at Serkawn Middle School in Lunglei, and was the topper in the Middle School Leaving Certificate examination under the Mizoram Board of School Education. He then went on to High School in Shillong from 1937 to 1940, followed by higher secondary education in an Intermediate of Science program at Serampore College in 1941. The next year he earned his certificate under the University of Calcutta.

== Military career ==
At the height of the Second World War in February 1942, Sailo applied for an emergency commission as a second lieutenant in the British Indian Army and was selected to join the Indian Military Academy in Dehradun. He received an emergency commission in November the same year and was posted to 2nd Punjab Regiment at Meerut. He became the first military officer among the Mizo people. He served in the Burma campaign in WWII and joined the Lushai Brigade. He was commended for his bravery and was twice mentioned in dispatches. After the Independence of India, he was promoted to lieutenant colonel in 1960, in 1963 he was again promoted to colonel, and then in 1966 to brigadier until his retirement in 1974.

== Politics ==
After retiring from the Army, Sailo created the Human Rights Committee in 1974, fighting alleged Army excess against civilians caught in the separatist conflict between the Indian Army and Mizo National Front. He submitted a memorandum containing 36 cases of atrocities committed by the Indian Army since 1 March 1966. To fight his cause in the political arena, he founded the People's Conference party (later renamed Mizo People's Conference) on 17 April 1975. He was arrested during the state of National Emergency under MISA, a period of massive crackdown on civil rights and political opposition. He spent 10 months in Nowgong special jail.

His party won the Mizoram Legislative Assembly election of 1978, and he became the second Chief Minister of Mizoram on 2 June 1978. Due to political unrest, his government was dissolved after six months in November 1978, and the Union Territory was declared under President's Rule. In the next election in 1979, his party won again and he once again became the Chief Minister, a post which he held for a full term till 1984. In the 1984 election, although he was elected in his constituency, his party was defeated by the Indian National Congress (Mizoram Pradesh Congress Committee) led by Lal Thanhawla. He became the Opposition Leader.

His party received a serious blow with the Mizoram Peace Accord of 1987, as the Mizo National Front emerged not only as a new political party, but was also offered the government as part of the peace negotiation. He joined forces with Lalduhoma, who had founded the Mizoram National Union, merging the two parties into Democratic Party. After failure in the 1989 Mizoram Legislative Assembly election, they joined the national party Janata Dal. Sailo parted way from the mainstream Janata Dal to make coalition with the Congress party in the 1993 election. Sailo's party named themselves the Mizoram Janata Dal, but which was not recognised by the Election Commission of India. Thus, his party members contested as independent candidates and managed to win eight seats that helped Lal Thanhawla of Congress to become the Chief Minister. After falling out with Congress party, Sailo changed its party to Mizoram People's Conference, to reflect its old name. In the 1998 elections, Sailo and his party supported the Mizo National Front, and made coalition government led by Zoramthanga of the Mizo National Front as the Chief Minister. Sailo was appointed Principal Advisor to the state government. His ministry also initiated the Aizawl city extension project, Bairabi Dam, which he alleged was never pursued by successive governments.

Sailo was elected again in the 2008 election, and as his last term as Member of the Legislative Assembly ended in January 2014, he retired. He announced his formal retirement at the assembly session on 24 July 2013. At age 92, he was allegedly the oldest elected member of any legislative body in the world.

== Awards and honours ==
Sailo was given the military award Ati Vishisht Seva Medal (AVSM) during his service. He was awarded the Padma Shree in 1999 by the Government of India. In 2001 the Mizo Zirlai Pawl declared him a corruption-free politician in their public poll. In April 2011, the then-Governor of Mizoram, Lt. Gen. Madan Mohan Lakhera, awarded him the Mizo Award organised by Mizoram's Vanglaini daily newspaper.

== Personal life and death ==
Sailo married Thansiami, daughter of Mizo folklorist P.S. Dahrawka, in 1946. They had three sons and a daughter. One of his sons, Lalsangliana, joined the Mizo rebels, the Mizo National Army (later Mizo National Front), in secret while studying at St. Edmund's College, Shillong in 1966. He became one of the elite "Special Force" under Laldenga, leader of the Mizo National Front. Two of his children, Lalhmangaiha and Laldingliani joined the Indian Revenue Service. After retirement, Lalhmangaiha, succeeded his father as President of the Mizoram People's Conference in 2011.

Sailo's daughter Laldingliani served as a member of the National Commission for Women (NCW) from 2013 to 2016.

Sailo's son Lalrinliana studied medicine and orthopaedic surgery and became Director General of Health Service for the Government of Mizoram.

Sailo wrote an autobiography of his military life, A Soldier's Story.

After suffering from lung problems and hypertension, on the morning of 27 March 2015, Sailo was taken to the New Life Hospital due to trouble breathing. He was pronounced dead at 11:50 IST. His funeral was held the next day at noon and he was interred at a private grave in his garden. President Pranab Mukherjee and Prime Minister Narendra Modi sent messages of condolence.

Preceded by President's rule	Chief Minister of Mizoram; 2 June 1978 – 10 November 1978	Succeeded by President's rule
Preceded by President's rule	Chief Minister of Mizoram; 8 May 1979 – 4 May 1984	Succeeded by Lal Thanhawla
