= Rokamlova =

Indian politician (1941–2020)

Upa Rokamlova

Speaker of the Mizoram Legislative Assembly
- In office 1990–1993

Member of the Mizoram Legislative Assembly
- In office 1987–1993
- Preceded by: New constituency
- Succeeded by: F. Lalremsiama
- Constituency: Aizawl East 2

Member of the Mizoram Legislative Assembly
- In office 1984–1987
- Preceded by: Thanmawil
- Succeeded by: Constituency abolished
- Constituency: Aizawal East

Personal details
- Born: 30 May 1941
- Died: 1 July 2020 (aged 79)
- Party: Indian National Congress

Upa Rokamlova (30 May 1941 – 1 July 2020) was an Indian National Congress politician from Mizoram. He was a Speaker of the Mizoram Legislative Assembly from 1990 to 1993. He was admitted to the Ebenezer Medical Centre in Aizawl on May 12, suffering from a kidney disorder. He died on July 1, aged 79.

== Career ==
He entered politics in the early 1980s after he left his position as Principal of Government Aizawl College and was instrumental in the signing of the historic Mizoram Peace Accord in 1986. He won the state assembly elections three times between 1984 and 1993. He also served as rural development and transport minister in Lal Thanhawla's government. He left politics in 1994.
