= Zoramthanga =

5th Chief Minister of Mizoram

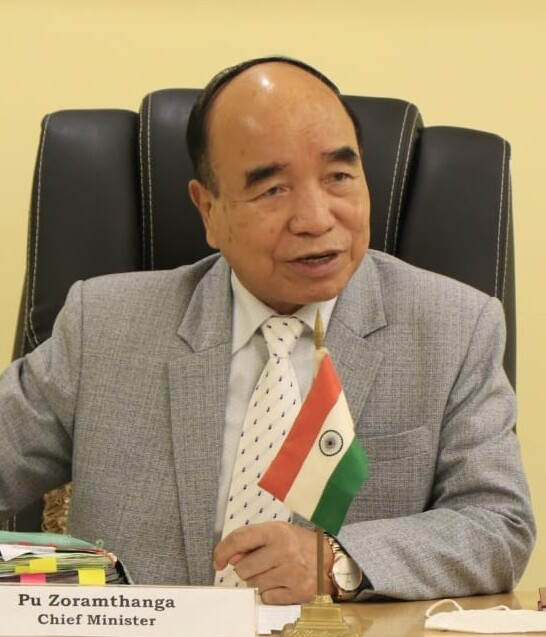
- Zoramthanga in 2022

5th Chief Minister of Mizoram
- In office 15 December 2018 – 7 December 2023
- Preceded by: Lal Thanhawla
- Succeeded by: Lalduhoma
- In office 3 December 1998 – 11 December 2008
- Preceded by: Lal Thanhawla
- Succeeded by: Lal Thanhawla

2nd President of the Mizo National Front
- Incumbent
- Assumed office 7 July 1990
- Preceded by: Laldenga

LOP in Mizoram Assembly
- In office 1993-98

Personal details
- Born: 13 July 1944 (age 82) Samthang, Lushai Hills, Assam Province, British India (present-day Mizoram, India)
- Party: Mizo National Front
- Other political affiliations: National Democratic Alliance
- Spouse: Roneihsangi
- Children: 3

Zoramthanga (born 13 July 1944) is an Indian politician and a former Chief Minister of Mizoram and leader of the house in state legislative assembly from 1998 to 2008 and 2018 to 2023. He is also the president of the Mizo National Front (MNF) party. He represented the Champhai constituency in the Mizoram Legislative Assembly from 1998 to 2008 and the Aizawl East I constituency from 2018 to 2023.

He was second-in-command to Laldenga during the secession movement of Mizo National Front, and became the successor as the party leader, after MNF was a recognised political party, following the death of Laldenga in 1990. He was Minister of Finance and Education in 1987. His party lost the 2008 assembly elections to the Indian National Congress. He contested from both North and South Champhai constituencies and lost in both. He tendered his resignation to Governor MM Lakhera on 8 December 2008 and left office three days later. He has cited anti-incumbency as reason for the loss of his party. He returned as Chief Minister after his party came back to power in the 2018 state assembly elections. Till 2023, he was the oldest chief minister in India.

== Early life and education ==
Zoramthanga was born to Darphunga and Vanhnuaichhingi on 13 July 1944 at Samthang village. He is the second youngest child of their eight children – five brothers and three sisters.

Zoramthanga entered primary school at Samthang in 1950. After completing class III, he studied at South Khawbung middle school in 1954, and completed class VI in 1956. In 1957, he moved to Champhai to enter Gandhi Memorial High School. His family joined him at Champhai in 1960. He completed matriculation in 1961. His family financial situation prevented him for further education since higher education was not available in Mizoram at the time. He instead became the Headmaster at Champhai Vengthlang Middle School. With his salary savings and much with self support, he went to Imphal, Manipur and got enrolled for pre-university college (PUC, equivalent to higher secondary) at Dhanamanjuri (D.M.) College of Arts (merged to Dhanamanjuri University). He completed PUC in 1962, and continued to study B.A. He graduated in 1966 with honours in English. Recalling his struggle, he said: "During my college days I worked in a stone quarry, chiseling and carrying loads of boulders. To be precise, I chiseled my way to graduation. I think I earned enough to support myself then."

Zoramthanga received his degree certificate only in 2026, 60 years after his graduation. He explained to the Hindustan Times: "I went underground immediately after my graduation exams. Later I returned secretly and managed to get my marksheet, but the degree certificate remained. After we gave up arms and joined the mainstream, I tried getting the certificate. But by that time my college had turned into a deemed university and was no longer affiliated to Gauhati University." On 20 August, Gauhati University made a public notification that reads: "Gauhati University has carefully preserved his certificates and on 20 August, six decades after successfully completing his undergraduate course, Zoramthanga will finally receive his degree certificate from the university." A special ceremony was held at the university's Phanidhar Dutta Seminar Hall in which the Vice Chancellor Nani Gopal Mahanta handed over the certificate to Zoramthanga.

== Career ==
=== Insurgency ===
Zoramthanga officially joined the Mizo National Front freedom movement in 1965, while in his last year of college. When the MNF uprising started in 1966, he joined the guerrilla movement and went underground to Bangladesh (then East Pakistan) border. He was offered the position of a secretary for Run Bung Area, a responsibility he held for three years. In 1969, all the MNF cadres went down to East Pakistan. The President, Laldenga, engaged him as his Secretary. He held this job for seven years. In 1979, he was given the responsibility of the Vice President.

=== Politics ===
The MNF rebellion ended in 1986 with the signing of Mizoram Peace Accord with the Government of India. MNF was offered to run an interim state government. With Laldenga as the Chief Minister, Zoramthanga was appointed as one of the Cabinet Ministers. Mizoram was declared a full state 20 February 1987. By then MNF had become a recognised political party. The first election for the Mizoram State Legislative Assembly was held in the same month, which resulted in the MNF winning the majority of assembly seats, 24 out of 40. Zoramthanga was elected from the Champhai constituency.

In the first Mizoram State Legislative Assembly, Zoramthanga became Minister of Finance and Education. In 1990, when Laldenga died, he became President of the Mizo National Front. In the 1993 election, MNF lost to the Indian National Congress party, but Zoramthanga won the Champhai constituency. He was appointed Leader of the Opposition in the legislative assembly. When the assembly elections were held at the end of 1998, he led his party to victory and became the Chief Minister of Mizoram for the first time. He was re-elected in the 2003 election becoming Chief Minister for the second time. But his party lost the 2008 Assembly elections to the Congress party. He lost from two candidatures from in Champhai North and Champhai South constituencies. He and his party again faced a heavy defeat in 2013 election to the Congress party. In 2018, his party got the majority again. He was elected from the Aizawl East-I constituency and became the Chief Minister of Mizoram on 15 December 2018. His party was faced with a landslide defeat to the Zoram People's Movement in the 2023 Assembly elections, with Zoramthanga losing his own constituency.

== Personal life ==
Zoramthanga is an eloquent debater. He won an inter-college debating competition at New Delhi while in his B.A. class. He is member of the Mizoram Presbyterian Church. He married Roneihsangi on 2 February 1988. They have one son, Rothansiama, and a daughter, Milari.

In April 2026, Zoramthanga released his autobiography titled From Guerrilla Fighter to Chief Minister: A Memoir, published by Penguin Books.

== Legal issues ==
=== First corruption case ===
In 2010, Zoramthanga was charged with several corruption cases. The main allegation was the supply of fencing materials from the Department of Agriculture to his private farm at Aii Puk during his tenure as Chief Minister (1998 to 2008). The supply was made in the name of Aii Puk Zau Cooperative Farming Society, owned by Zoramthanga. A Public Interest Litigation was submitted to Gauhati High Court by an anti-corruption organization, People's Right to Information and Development Society of Mizoram (PRISM), in 2007, and again in 2009. Upon lack of action, PRISM submitted the charges to the Anti-Corruption Bureau of Mizoram Police that included disproportionate wealth with respect to his income, supply of fencing materials to Aii Puk, and extortion of funds from government contractors. The ACB filed corruption cases under the Prevention of Corruption Act, 1988, on 16 September 2010, following which his residence was raided for evidences.

The ACB reported that Zoramthanga had amassed a total property value of ₹90.9 million in 2010 from the official declaration of ₹13.8 million in 2003. Zoramthanga declared that of his total capital, ₹44.9 million was his brother L. Nghakliana's and nephew Zoramchhana's which he managed on their behalf. On 8 November 2021, the court of Special Judge (Prevention of Corruption Act) of Mizoram dismissed the cases. Zoramthanga was acquitted of charges on misuse of power in the case of Aii Puk, and as to the disproportionate wealth, the court "did not find sufficient evidence to prove" the allegations.

=== Mizoram Intodelhna Project case ===
In 2002, Zoramthanga's ministry created an agricultural development project largely to mitigate the slash-and-burn system. The scheme called Mizoram Intodelhna Project (MIP) was designed as financial grants to farmers who were pursuing alternative agriculture systems. In 2009, PRISM filed a case to the Anti-Corruption Bureau that Zoramthanga, H. Rammawi, then Agriculture Minister, and Lalhuapzauva, Adviser to Chief Minister, had given on loan basis large sums of money to private firms against project guidelines. According to the allegation, ₹5 million rupees were given to Mizoram Venus Bamboo Product Pvt. Ltd., and ₹8.3 million rupees each to Hnahlan Grape Growers' Society and Champhai Grape Growers' Society. The ACB started investigation in 2009 and chargesheeted the case in 2013. The Gauhati High Court put the case before the Special Court under Prevention of Corruption in 2018. The first court hearing was called in 2019 but was cancelled due to absence of a witness. The three accused appeared before the court on 17 February 2021. The Special Judge acquitted them on 30 March 2021 on the grounds of lack of evidence.

=== Chanchinmawia's case ===
Revd. Chanchinmawia, moderator of Mizoram Presbyterian Church Synod and Chairman of Mizoram People's Forum, was found dead in the morning of 1 October 2007 at his quarters-residence at Khatla, Aizawl, Mizoram. Lying in a pool of blood, his body showed several cut wounds and bruises. A hammer and a knife drenched in blood were by his side. The police report, upon which Additional District Magistrate (Judicial) of Aizawl made a judgement, declared in December 2007 that it was a case of suicide. His son Ramdinpuia, backed by the church, disagreed and believed that it was a homicide. The case was reopened in 2008 and the Central Bureau of Investigation was put on the task. The CBI also reached the same conclusion and reported that, "In view of the available circumstantial evidences vis-a-vis ..the forensic experts' reports, prima facie, no foul play indicated."

In 2018, an information was published in a newsletter Congress Thlifim that Chanchinmawia's death was a case of murder and the then-Chief Minister Zoramthanga masterminded the assassination. The newsletter asserted that in the interrogation of criminal suspects, one, Muanhlua claimed that he knew six people who were paid by Zoramthanga to commit the murder, and a voice record which mentioned that Muanhlua demanded from Zoramthanga a huge sum of money for keeping silent. In March 2017, the Mizo National Front and B. Zorampara, the president of Peace Accord MNF Returnees Association, filed a case against Thansanga, an informant to the newsletter. Thansanga had also said that Zorampara was the one who recruited the murderers from Manipur. On 17 May 2017, Zoramthanga filed a defamation case against Thansanga, as well as James Thanghmingliana, the publisher, and David M. Thangliana, the editor.

Political offices
Preceded by Lal Thanhawla	Chief Minister of Mizoram; 3 December 1998 – 11 December 2008	Succeeded by Lal Thanhawla
Preceded by Lal Thanhawla	Chief Minister of Mizoram; 15 December 2018 – December 2023	Succeeded by Lalduhoma
