= Laldenga =

Chief Minister of Mizoram (11 June 1927 – 7 July 1990)

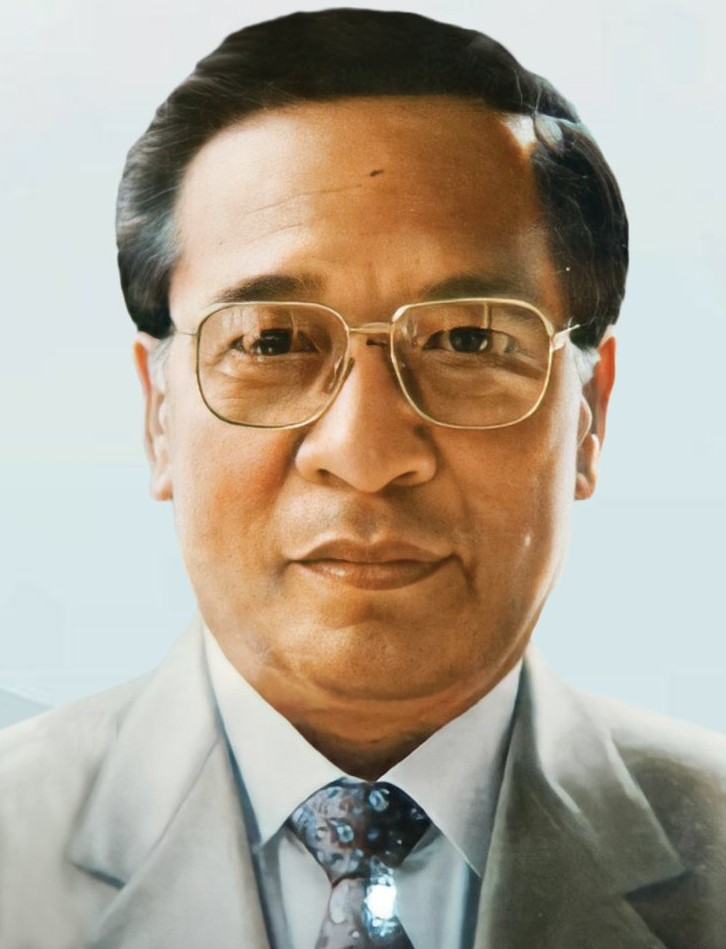

4th Chief Minister of Mizoram
- In office 21 August 1986 – 7 September 1988
- Lieutenant Governor: H. S. Dubey; Hiteswar Saikia
- Governor: Hiteswar Saikia
- Preceded by: Lal Thanhawla
- Succeeded by: President's rule

Leader of Opposition of Mizoram Assembly

Personal details
- Born: 11 June 1927 Pukpui, Assam Province, British India (now Mizoram, India)
- Died: 7 July 1990 (aged 63) London, United Kingdom
- Cause of death: Lung cancer
- Resting place: Treasury Square, Aizawl
- Party: Mizo National Front
- Spouse: Lalbiakdiki
- Known for: Leader of Mizo National Front uprising

Laldenga (11 June 1927 – 7 July 1990) was a Mizo separatist and politician from Mizoram in northeast India. He was the founder of the Mizo National Front, a social organisation turned political party. He was the first Chief Minister of Mizoram as a federated state, the office of which he held from 1986 to 1988.

Originally a Havildar in the Indian Army, Laldenga later worked as an Accounts Clerk in the Government of Assam. Disappointed by the government's indifference to the severe famine (called Mautam) in the Mizo district in the late 1950s, he rebelled against the government. As a leader of the Mizo National Front (MNF), he led a secessionist war seeking Mizo territory's independence from India. He was captured many times, and spent most of his time in exile in Bangladesh. The guerrilla movement lasted for sixteen years till the Mizo Accord was signed in 1986, by which he became the Chief Minister of the new state of Mizoram. He won the first Mizoram Legislative Assembly election under statehood in 1987, and continued as Chief Minister for another year. He died of lung cancer in 1990.

== Early years ==
Laldenga, the fourth child of a cultivator Liantlira Ralte and Darchhungi Hnamte, was born on 11 June 1927 in village Pukpui in the Mizo district of Assam (now in the Lunglei district of Mizoram). He joined the Indian Army in 1944 and served up to Havildar. He resigned from the army and joined civil service as Accounts Supervisor under District Council office in Aizawl.

== Secessionist movements ==
Laldenga joined a voluntary organisation called Mizo Cultural Society, formed in 1955, as its Secretary. The society became Mautam Front in March 1960 to work for relief due to the Mautam famine that affected the entire Mizoram (which was then a district council of Assam). The government could not make efficient effort to provide basic survival needs, and this prompted the need for more powerful pressure group. The organisation was then renamed Mizo National Famine Front (MNFF) in September 1960. This soon evolved into a political organisation and ultimately became the Mizo National Front (MNF) on 22 October 1961. Laldenga took the support from Pakistan for the separatist movement and was arrested and jailed by Indian authorities. As an outcome of his talks, between 1963 and 1966 East Pakistan provided military training and shelter to Mizo fighters when they needed exile.

On the night of 28 February 1966, the MNF launched a daring and ambitious attack on the district's major towns, resulting in the March 1966 Mizo National Front uprising. It declared independence and called on the Mizos to rise against India. The Indian government responded by sending troops and aircraft on bombing missions. Villagers were uprooted from the hills and sent without their consent to what were called Regrouped Villages built along the highways. For the next 20 years, violence continued in the Mizo hills with the fighters camping in Mizoram (India) and East Pakistan. With the fall of East Pakistan in 1971, Laldenga's men scattered to Myanmar while he moved to Pakistan. After secret meetings in Europe with Indian officials, he returned seeking a peaceful resolution of the problem.

During his guerrilla life, Laldenga was arrested on several occasions and spent 10 years in exile, mostly in Bangladesh and Pakistan. He returned to India for peace talks in 1976, but the terms of negotiations failed in 1982. MNF was officially outlawed in January, and he, with some relatives, were arrested. He was extradited by the Indian government in April.

== Peace Accord and political career ==
When Rajiv Gandhi became the Prime Minister of India in 1984, it encouraged a new wave of negotiation. Laldenga met him on 15 February 1985, and peace settlement was on its way. On 30 June 1986 the official document entitled Mizoram Accord, 1986, Memorandum of Settlement was then signed by Laldenga, R. D. Pradhan, Home Secretary, and Lalkhama, Chief secretary.

Laldenga became an interim Chief Minister, as the sitting Chief Minister Lalthanhawla stepped down to Deputy Chief Minister. Under the terms of the accord, Mizoram was granted statehood in February 1987. Laldenga and his party MNF won the first elections to the state legislature. Elected from Sateek and Aizawl North-II constituencies, he became the first Chief Minister of Mizoram as a federated state. Laldenga would host a parade in Aizawl on 5 July 1986 to be popularly received on the 25km road from Tuireil airfield with white flags, Mizo slogans and music. Laldenga stated during the parade "I am happy to be back among my people. We have achieved the first step of what we set out to do." The parade had MNF soldiers wearing the military uniform and armed with guns which created skepticism of critics and led to Congress convincing the lieutenant governor to halt such practices. The Congress party also convinced the MNF to change their party manifesto which was completed by Zoramthanga. Laldenga's speeches of Greater Mizoram also led to press coverage in which Rajiv Gandhi affirmed the peace accord's success. Leaders from Tripura, Manipur and Assam complained to Rajiv Gandhi who reprimanded Laldenga's speeches for inflaming tensions and possibly irking Bangladesh and Burma. Chakma delegates also spoke to Rajiv Gandhi on his tour to Mizoram for a union territory out of fear of Laldenga, which Rajiv Gandhi agreed to study.

Laldenga would subsequently instruct his finance minister Rualchinna to head to the MNF headquarters at Parva on the border of the Arakan Hills to bring out the remaining rebels and collect all the arms to surrender. The event was covered by journalists airlied by the Government of India on 28 July 1986. Laldenga and his wife dined with the rebels and returnees upon the demobilisation of the MNF. He promised the returneees proper rehabilitation into society.

Laldenga headed a coalition government in Aizawl on 21 August 1986. His cabinet was sworn in by Lieutenant Governor H.S. Dubey in the Raj Niwas (later renamed Lok Bhavan). The function proceed with the playing of the national anthem by the Assam Rifles band. On 3 September 1986, Laldenga proposed rehabilitation policies for returnees of the MNF struggle. However, the Mizo Congress accused Laldenga of partiality and charged him with bad faith.

The elections commissioned a date for elections on 16 February 1987. The main candidates were Laldenga, Lalthanhawla and T. Sailo. The assembly consisted of 40 members becoming the first elected assembly in Mizoram. Presidential proclamation declared upgrade of the Union Territory of Mizoram into the State of Mizoram. The elections returned the MNF to power. Laldenga's party secured 25 seats while the Congress got 12 and People's Party got 3. However, Laldenga dismissed his chief secretary Lalkhama and became more despotic. The conduct led to disillusionment in Mizo individuals who began to criticize Laldenga. The Congress party also began to inflame the opposition to Laldenga. The nature of political favours in the MNF also led to many part members being discontented with Laldenga's rule leading to a split of the party into two factions around Laldenga.

Previous insurgents who opposed the Mizo Accord and viewed it as a failure of Laldenga in a sovereign independent Mizoram formed the Mizo Liberation Army and cooperated with the Tripura National volunteers. The discovery of weapon caches and incriminating documents led to the arrests of six members of the People's Conference in Manipur and commanders in exile. The Mizoram Congress charged the MNF government with continuation of the insurgency and support for the MLA. Laldenga treated the spoilers of the peace accord with harsh punishments to distance his connection from the offshoot organization. The MLA was tied to the People's Conference under T. Sailo who was assumed to be responsible in a plot to discredit Laldenga's administration. However support began to wane as returnees from the insurgency became disillusioned with delays of the promise of rehabilitation.

Laldenga's soon assigned H. Rummawia who was of the People's Conference and of the MLA organization. This was to appease the people's conference who were discrediting him. However, Laldenga's own party held him in contempt for this decision by denying their own political careers over a policy of appeasement. Laldenga promised the dissidents of his party future cabinet positions. Within a few months the House was dissolved and the promises were unfulfilled. Laldenga was accused of corruption by constructing a palatial building for himself. The MNF was also revealed to be awarding official contracts of heavy sums to some MNF leaders.

Minorities in Mizoram such as the Chakmas, Pawi and Mara complained of harassment of the MNF. Laldenga's rise to power had encouraged zealous Christians to attempt forceful conversions of Chakma individuals. Some Chakma houses were also burnt as a result. The Lakher district and council claimed the MNF halted the grants to their administration and were unable to let them pay the salaries of their government employees. Laldenga's attempt to abolish the district councils of the minorities and remove funding of minorites in Mizoram was perceived as hostility.

== Death ==
Laldenga never rose to political arena again due to chronic lung cancer. In early 1990, he received medical treatments at the Memorial Sloan Kettering Cancer Center in New York City. After a three-month therapy, he headed home via England. Just after landing at the London airport, he died as he was taken to Ashford Hospital on 7 July 1990. His body was brought back to Aizawl on 11 July and was honoured with the first state funeral in Mizoram on 13 July, and buried at the centre of Aizawl city.
