= Mizoram Peace Accord =

1986 peace agreement between the government of India and the Mizo National Front

Mizoram Peace Accord, 1986
- Type: Peace
- Signed: June 30, 1986
- Location: New Delhi, India
- Original signatories: Laldenga; (India) R. D. Pradhan; Lalkhama
- Parties: Mizo National Front; Government of India; Government of Mizoram
- Language: English

The Mizoram Peace Accord, 1986 was an official agreement between the Government of India and the Mizo National Front (MNF) to end insurgency and violence in Mizoram, India, that started in 1966. The Mizo National Front was an organisation of Mizo secessionists led by Laldenga to fight for independence from India. The movement was basically due to lack of support from the government during the great famine (called Mautam) in Mizoram in the late 1950s. Political insurgency and social unrest ensued in the next decades. After a number of negotiations, the document titled Mizoram Accord, 1986: Memorandum of Settlement was finally signed on 30 June 1986. It was signed by Laldenga for MNF, R.D. Pradhan, Home Secretary, Government of India, and Lalkhama, Chief Secretary, Government of Mizoram. It is remarked as the most and only successful peace agreement in India after its independence from British Empire in 1947.

== Background ==
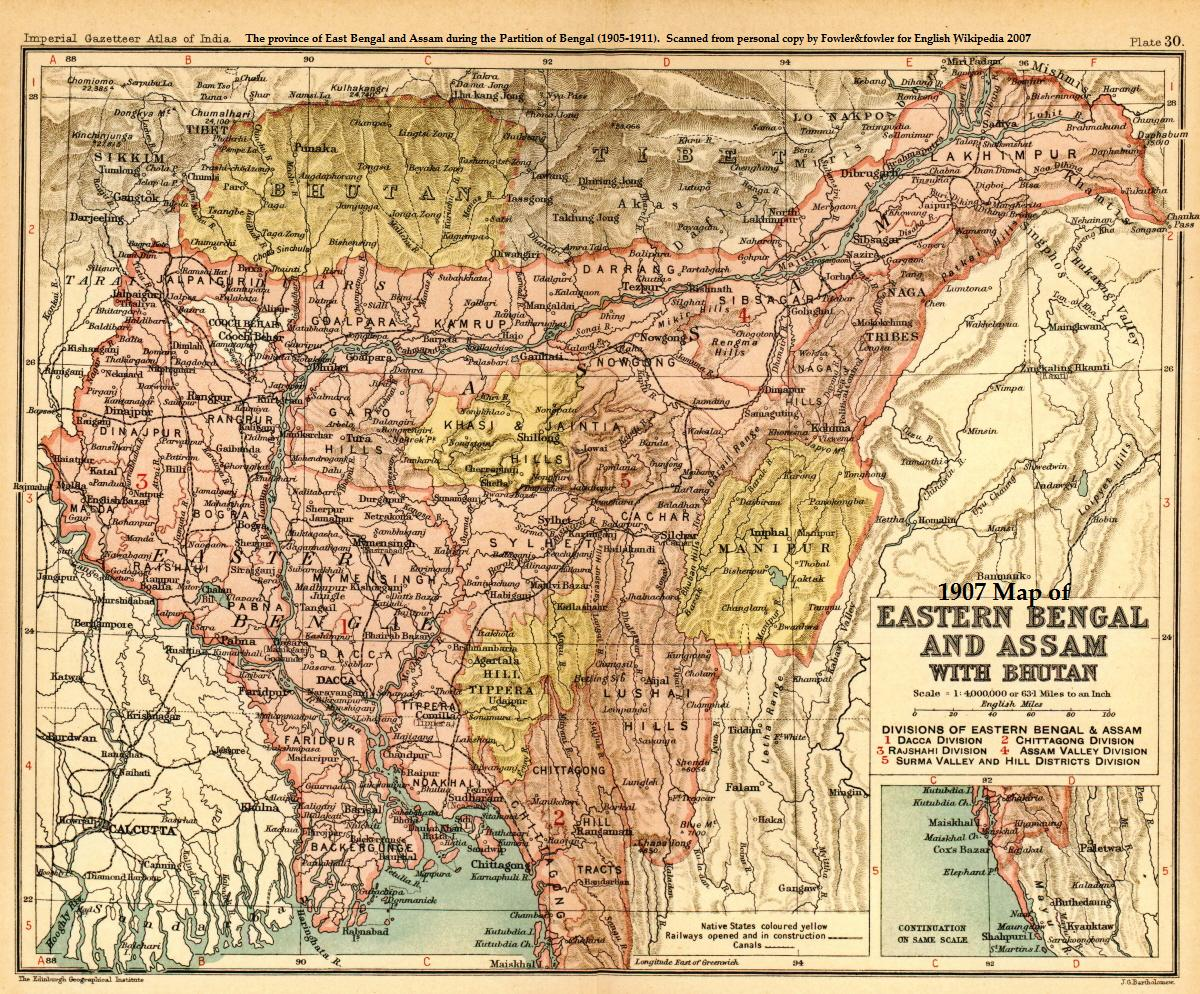
1907 Vintage Map showing the Lushai Hills District

The Mizo people were incorporated to the British rule since the 1870 as a retaliation of the Mizo people invading the British territory and capturing a British girl Zoluti (Mary Winchester). As India gained independence in 1947, the Mizo people were governed under the state of Assam. In 1952, a subsidiary government called the Lushai Hills District was created under Assam, which basically covered the later Mizoram. There was a general opposition as many Mizo people were demarcated in Manipur and Burma (Myanmar). They demanded that Mizo people should be given freedom of either independence or join Burma. The political situation was exacerbated in 1959 when there was a famine due to Mautam. Mautam is a literal term for bamboo flowering and death every 48 or so years. It was accompanied by plagues of insects and rodents. Particularly plagues of rats caused total agricultural destruction in 1959. The Mizo people blamed Assam and Indian authorities for negligence. A social organisation named Mautam Front was established in 1960 for local relief works. It was soon renamed the Mizo National Famine Front to enthuse the Mizo people that the organisation was of the Mizo people only. As the famine subsided the next year, the organisation turned more political and became Mizo National Front (MNF). In November 1961, it officially became a political party with Laldenga as its president. The main goal was then to struggle for creating Greater Mizoram so as to encompass all the Mizo tribes in a single political governance. It led to political insurgency and social unrest lasting for two decades.

=== Uprising and insurgency ===
The MNF created its armed wing, the Mizo National Army. It declared independence from India on 1 March 1966 under the Operation Jericho. Guerilla war broke out immediately in major towns. The first major action was an attack on the Telephone Exchange and ransack of Government Treasury in Aizawl. Government offices and stations were attacked and destroyed. The Government of Assam declared Lushai Hills District as a "disturbed area" the next day, and the central government banned MNF as a terror organisation under the Defence of India Rule. The Indian Army was deployed in the region as a retaliation. The army was authorised with "Operation Security" by which soldiers rounded up suspicious civilians. Civil liberties were completely suppressed in the region. Starting from 5 March, Aizawl was attacked with strategic bombing and became uninhabitable.

The Armed Forces Special Power Act (AFSPA) was enforced in 1967. An administrative called "grouping" was declared under rules such as Protected and Progressive Villages, New Grouping Centres, Voluntary Grouping Centres and Extended Loop Areas. With military force small villages were evacuated and regrouped into larger clusters. The guerillas were outmatched and outnumbered and were forced to flee in Bangladesh (then East Pakistan) and adjoining Burma. MNF then became a lingering underground movement.

=== Negotiation for peace ===
As the civilians were the ones to suffer the most, local social organisations and church leaders were compelled to make negotiations. As a Christianised society the Mizo people had only the church as the peacemaker. The authorities of Presbyterian and Baptist churches jointly created a Peace Committee to negotiate between the rebels and the government. Zairema, a Presbyterian minister, was the dominant force in the initial negotiations starting from 1968. The first major communication between MNF and the government was in 1974 when Laldenga (from London as a political refugee) submitted his terms to Indira Gandhi, the then Prime Minister of India. But to no avail. By 1982, the prospects of agreement were grim. The Governor of Mizoram Sourendra Nath Kohli sought for the effort from church leaders. On 15 June 1982, representatives of different church denominations met at the Synod Conference Hall in Aizawl. "Zoram Kohhran Hruaitute Committee (ZKHC)" (Mizoram Churches Leaders' Committee) was formed on 30 July. They started fresh negotiations from the perspectives of the civilians who were oppressed by the military administration. V. L. Rawna, Secretary of ZKHC, met Laldenga in London on 1 March 1983 and asked him to lay down arms. In May ZKHC convinced all political parties to make a joint memorandum for peace. Signed by all party presidents, the memorandum stated:

On this thirty first day of May, of the year Nineteen hundred and eighty three, We, the undersigned, representing all political parties in Mizoram, do hereby declare our united stand in urging the Government of India and the Mizo National Front to enter into fresh negotiations and dialogue in order to arrive at a peaceful settlement of political deadlock in Mizoram. We affirm that all sections of people living in the Union Territory are in full accord with this plea, and we further declare our unanimous assurance of readiness to render any possible help towards creating a conducive atmosphere for peace talk to resume.

With this resolution, they met Rajiv Gandhi, the All India Congress Committee General Secretary, who visited Aizawl on 7 March 1984, and Prime Minister Indira Gandhi who visited Aizawl on 16 April. In October 1984, Ladenga returned to India but the assassination of Gandhi on 31 October hampered any further development. It was the day scheduled for the peace talk. After several communications, MNF agreed to the conditions laid down by the Government of India in 1986.

== The peace accord ==
As Rajiv Gandhi became Prime Minister, he focused on national harmony and immediately prepared agreement documents for MNF. The then Home Secretary G. Parthasarathy was of little help as Laldenga objected to the terms. This was because Gandhi and his government could not accept Ladenga's demands such as:

1. All MNF members should be freed from criminal charges.
2. No Act of Indian Parliament would be legalised in Mizoram unless the state government approves it.
3. Mizoram should be a separate state and be given a university and high court.

Gandhi then appointed R.D. Pradhan for negotiation starting from September 1985. After a series of agreement failures, Pradhan invited Laldenga for a casual cup of tea at his office in New Delhi on 27 June. It was Pradhan's birthday on 27 June 1986. As Pradhan was due to retire in three days, he confided to Laldenga that if he really wanted peace, he should concede to the terms of the government immediately, as his successors in the office are unlikely to offer better terms. After two days of silence, Laldenga entered Pradhan's office alone in the afternoon of 30 June to agree to the peace terms. But then Pradhan was leaving his office and told Ladenga that it was no longer his authority to initiate the function. As Laldenga pleaded, Pradhan agreed to meet him at 4:30 p.m. after his farewell party. At the appointed time, they drove to 7 Race Course Road, where Prime Minister Rajiv Gandhi arranged for emergency meeting of the Cabinet Committee on Political Affairs. Gandhi extended the service period of Pradhan up to that midnight. The Mizoram Accord, 1986: Memorandum of Settlement was settled at 8:30 p.m. In the presence of Laldenga's wife, MNF officials, and Lal Thanhawla, the then Chief Minister of Mizoram, the accord was signed and publicly broadcast at 9:30 p.m. It was signed by Laldenga on behalf of MNF, R.D. Pradhan, Home Secretary, on behalf of the Government of India, and Lalkhama, Chief Secretary, on behalf of the Government of Mizoram. The two principal demands of the government were that MNF would cease any violent activities and adhere to rules of the Indian government.

=== Important terms and conditions ===
The statement of the accord entailed the following terms and conditions:

- The Mizo National Front should surrender all arms, ammunition, and equipment to the government.
- The MNF should amend its constitutions so as to conform to the Indian constitution.
- The MNF should detach itself from support from Tripura National Volunteer, People's Liberation Army of Manipur and other allied revolutionary organisations.
- The government should provide necessary settlement and rehabilitation to all underground personnel.

==== Legal binding ====
- The government should take action to make Mizoram, which was then a Union Territory, to a full-fledged state.
- The territory of Mizoram should be specified according to the territory specified in Section 6 of the North Eastern Areas (Reorganization) Act, 1971.
- After normalcy is established, the President of India should hold election for the Mizoram Legislative Assembly.
- Assistance should be given to the state government according the case of "Special Category State".
- Border trade would be legalised upon agreement with neighbouring countries (namely Bangladesh and Myanmar).
- The Innerline Regulation (which restricted unauthorised visit or stay in Mizoram) should remain in force.

==== Other provisions ====
- The new state would be able to adopt one or more of the local dialects as its official language.
- Establishment of a new university in the state.
- Separate high court for the state (if the state wishes).
- Government will make amelioration such as compensation to places occupied by the military and to families of people killed in the 1966 uprising.

== Outcome ==
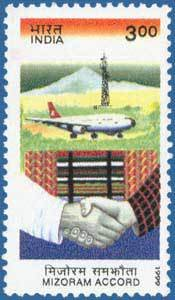
Mizoram Accord postage stamp, 1999

MNF surrendered all their arms, ammunition and equipment to the government. With it MNF gave up its struggle for independence and Greater Mizoram. The concession of giving up Greater Mizoram disappointed Hmar groups in Southern Manipur and Northeast Mizoram. The Hmar People's Convention formed in 1986 to demand an autonomous self-governing area in Northern Mizoram. The HPC participated in clashes coordinated alongside Naga groups until talks between 1992-1994 allowed a Memorandum of Settlement between the Mizoram State Government and the HPC.

Shortly after the signing of the Mizo Accord, in celebration, the Prime Minister Rajiv Gandhi and his wife Sonia made a three-day good-will tour to Mizoram in July 1986. The ruling political party in Mizoram, Indian National Congress, surrendered their legislative term. As a recognised political party MNF became the ruling legislative party, with Laldenga as the first Chief Minister of the state. In the next general election, MNF won and Laldenga continued as the Chief Minister.

The Government of India officially approved statehood to Mizoram on 7 August 1986. Mizoram became the 23rd state of the Indian Union on 20 February 1987.

A high court (Gauhati High Court Aizawl Bench) was established on 5 July 1990.

As part of the deal, the Mizoram University was established after a decade and half of the accord by an Act of Parliament on 25 April 2000. The university was formally inaugurated on 1 July 2001. It now administers all colleges and professional institutes in Mizoram.

30 June became the official public holiday "Remna Ni" (literally "peace day") of the Government of Mizoram.
