= Lal Thanhawla =

Indian politician

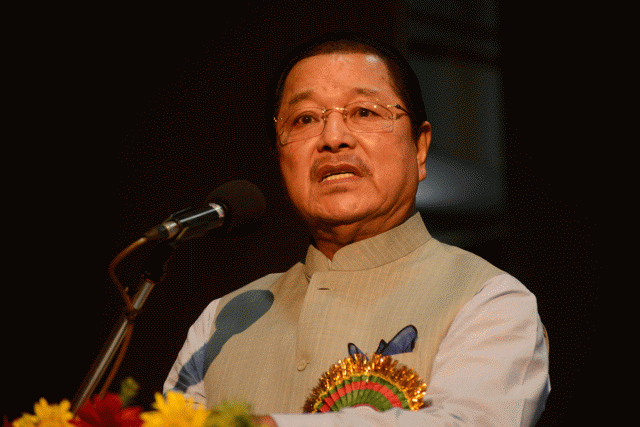
- Lal Thanhawla in 2016

3rd Chief Minister of Mizoram
- In office 11 December 2008 – 14 December 2018
- Governor: Madan Mohan Lakhera,Vakkom Purushothaman,Kamla Beniwal,Vinod Kumar Duggal,Krishan Kant Paul,Aziz Qureshi,Keshari Nath Tripathi,Nirbhay Sharma,Kummanam Rajasekharan
- Preceded by: Zoramthanga
- Succeeded by: Zoramthanga
- In office 24 January 1989 – 3 December 1998
- Governor: Hiteswar Saikia,K. V. Krishna Rao,Williamson A. Sangma,Swaraj Kaushal,Paty Ripple Kyndiah,Siddheshwar Prasad,Arun Prasad Mukherjee,A. Padmanabhan
- Preceded by: President's rule
- Succeeded by: Zoramthanga
- In office 5 May 1984 – 20 August 1986
- Lieutenant Governor: H. S. Dubey, Hiteswar Dakia
- Preceded by: T. Sailo
- Succeeded by: Laldenga

Deputy Chief Minister of Mizoram
- In office 1986 - 1987
- Preceded by: position established
- Succeeded by: Lalhmingthanga

President of Mizoram Pradesh Congress Committee
- In office 12 June 1973 – 5 December 2021
- Preceded by: C. L. Ruala
- Succeeded by: Lalsawta

Opposition leader of the Mizoram Assembly
- In office 1987-88, 2003-08

Personal details
- Born: 19 May 1942 (age 84) Aizawl, Assam Province, British India (now in Mizoram, India)
- Party: Indian National Congress
- Spouse: Lal Riliani
- Relations: Lal Thanzara (brother)
- Children: Zauva Sailo (L); Lal Thankhumi
- Education: Pachhunga University College

Pu Lal Thanhawla (born 19 May 1938 or 1942) is an Indian politician and former Chief Minister of Mizoram, belonging to the Indian National Congress. He holds the record for being the longest-serving Chief Minister of Mizoram, occupying the position for five terms: 1984 to 1986, 1989 to 1993, 1993 to 1998, 2008 to 2013, and 2013 to 2018. He served as President of the Mizoram Pradesh Congress Committee from 1973 to 2021. His electoral constituencies were Serchhip and Hrangturzo from where he successfully contested the Mizoram Legislative Assembly elections nine times, in 1978, 1979, 1984, 1987, 1989, 1993, 2003, 2008, and 2013.

== Early life ==
Lal Thanhawla is the son of Hmartawnphunga Sailo and Lalsawmliani Chawngthu. He completed matriculation in 1958. He passed his intermediate examination (higher secondary) in arts in 1961. Thereafter, he obtained his B.A. at Pachhunga University College (then Aijal College), which was then affiliated to Gauhati University, graduating in 1964.

== Career ==
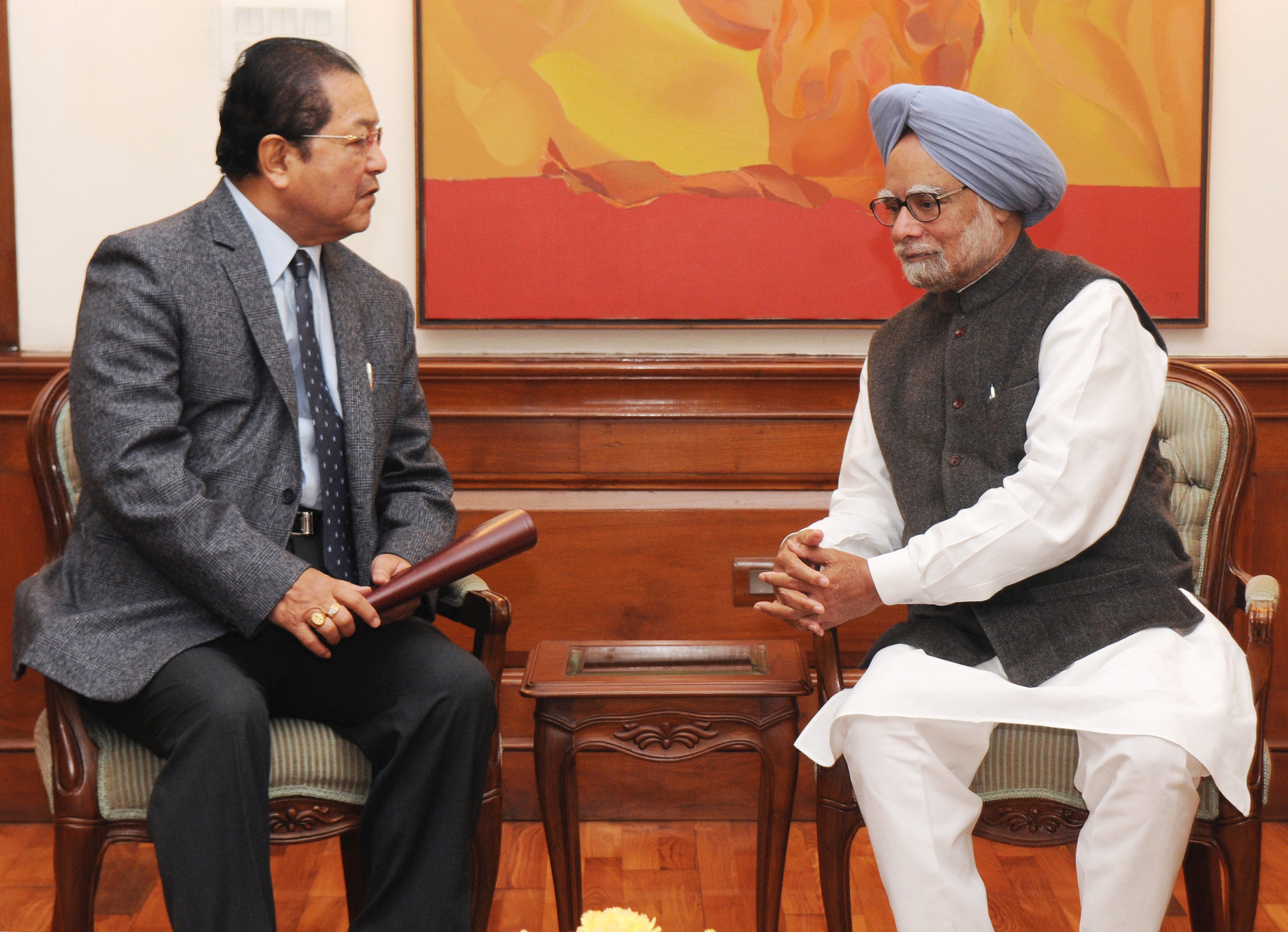
The Chief Minister of Mizoram, Shri Pu Lal Thanhawla calling on the Prime Minister, Dr. Manmohan Singh, in New Delhi on February 25, 2013

Lal Thanhawla started his career as Recorder in the office of Inspector of Schools under the Mizoram District Council, which was in turn under the Government of Assam. After that, he joined the Assam Co-operative Apex Bank as Assistant. In 1966, he joined the Mizo National Front (MNF) underground movement as Foreign Secretary. He was captured and imprisoned at Silchar jail. After his release in 1967 he joined the Indian National Congress (INC) party. He was immediately appointed as Chief Organiser of the Aizawl District Congress Committee. In 1973 he was elected President of the Mizoram Pradesh Congress Committee (MPCC), a branch of the Indian National Congress, and continued to win the presidency in every election until 2021. In 1978 and 1979 he was elected as a Legislator in Union Territory Elections.

In 1984, under his leadership, the Congress party swept the Union Territory and Thanhawla became the Chief Minister. In 1986, when the Mizoram Peace Accord was signed between the Indian government and the MNF, he stepped down from his office to make way for Laldenga, the leader of the MNF, to become the Chief Minister. This was part of the negotiation and settlement of the accord, and he was designated Deputy Chief Minister. Mizoram was consequently declared a full state of India. In the first Mizoram Legislative Assembly election held in 1987, he was elected and after Laldenga was toppled through defections, became the Chief Minister in 1988. He continued in office after being re-elected in the 1989 and 1993 elections. In 1998 he lost his position after the election, which he eventually reclaimed in the 2003 elections.

In the 2013 Mizoram Assembly Elections, Thanhawla led the ruling Congress party to a victory winning 34 seats in the 40-member legislative assembly, two seats more than in the 2008 election. The major opposition party Mizo National Front (MNF) barely won five seats, while Mizoram People's Conference (MPC) won just one seat. In the 2018 Mizoram Assembly Elections, he lost the election for the second time.

In November 2021, Thanhawla announced his voluntary retirement from party leadership, saying to The Indian Express: "Politics is in my blood and I can never shrug it off. But I do think it is high time that I make way for someone younger. I am a grand old man now." The INC President, Sonia Gandhi formally accepted his resignation on 4 December. The next day, Gandhi appointed him as a member of the Congress Working Committee, and Lalsawta as the new President of MPCC.

== Other activities ==
Lal Thanhawla is actively involved in sports and voluntary services. Major roles he's held in these areas include:

- Founder President of Mizoram Football Association
- Founder President of Mizoram Sports Association
- Founder President of Mizoram Hockey Association
- Founder Secretary of Mizoram Boxing Association
- Founder Secretary of Aijal Amateur Athletic Club
- Founder President of Mizoram Olympic Association
- Former President of Indian Olympic Association
- Chairman of North East Olympic Commission
- Founder President of Mizoram Journalists Association
- Founder editor of Mizo Aw (a daily newspaper) and Remna Palai (INC party daily news)
- Founder of Young Mizo Association at Zarkawt
- Founder Secretary of Aizawl Dramatic & Cultural Society

In addition he served as:

- Secretary of Central Information Forum
- Chairman of Literacy Committee, National Development Council of India
- Member of the 9th Finance Commission of India
- Member of the Shillong Club Ltd. and Country Club of India

== Awards and recognition ==
- National Citizen Award in 1994
- Mother Teresa Lifetime Achievement Award in 2009
- Lalthanhawla Higher Secondary School, established in 2011 at Serchhip, was named in his honor
- Lifetime Achievement Award from the Evangelical Fellowship of India (EFI) in 2014
- A sports complex at Pitarte Tlang, Republic Vengthlang, Aizawl, was inaugurated in 2012 as Hawla Indoor Stadium
- A public hall at Treasury Square, Aizawl, was inaugurated in 2015 as "Lal Thanhawla Auditorium"
- Granted Doctor of Divinity (honoris causa) by Serampore College in 2019

== Controversies ==
=== Graft case ===
In 1995, officials of the Income Tax Department investigated a case of tax evasion by the Baid Group, which operated a travel agency Capital Travels (Capital Tours (India) Pvt. Ltd.), in northeast India. On 13 September, they found evidence of government funds swindled between Jodhraj Baid, head of the Baid group operating in Mizoram, Lal Thanhawla, the Chief Minister, and Santosh Mohan Dev, the Union Minister. Based on this evidence, two social workers, Zairema and Bualhranga, filed a public interest litigation action with the Supreme Court of India in 1996. The case file accused Thanhawla, along with Baid and Pushpa Sharma (an accountant employed by Baid), of corruption arising from disproportionate income and assets.

An investigation was carried out by the anti-corruption wing of the Mizoram police from 1998, and P. Singthanga, Special Judge of the Prevention of Corruption Act, was appointed as the prosecutor. On 25 April 2003, a chargesheet was submitted by John Neihlaia, Commandant of the First Battalion of the Mizoram Armed Police, upon which the court ordered an arrest. Thanhawla evaded jail, as he had already obtained anticipatory bail the previous December. Baid and Sharma were detained in jail for a day until they obtained bail as well. The first trial, held in August 2003, found evidence of corruption.

In June 2006, Jodhraj Baid submitted a petition regarding the incompetency of Singthanga to the Gauhati High Court, and subsequently to the Supreme Court, both of which dismissed the petitions. Thanhawla appeared before Singthanga in September and was again charge-sheeted. After several court hearings, T. Saikunga, Special Judge of a District and Sessions Court, dissolved Thanhawla's case on 26 February 2010 on the grounds that "there was no clear evidence" of money laundering.

=== Declaration case ===
When Lal Thanhawla filed candidature for the 2013 Mizoram Legislative Assembly from two constituencies, Serchhip and Champhai South, he failed to declare an immovable property in the filing. As his Chief Minister term was closing in 2018, his nomination papers were re-examined by Lalhriatrenga Chhangte, Deputy Controller of Mines at Indian Bureau of Mines in Kolkata. Chhangte knew that Thanhawla owned a plot of land in this jurisdiction which did not appear in the property declaration. By this time, Thanhawla had begun to construct a building on the property.

Chhangte submitted corruption charges regarding Thanhawla under Section 125 A of the Representation of the People Act, 1951 to the Chief Judicial Magistrate of Serchhip District on 17 January 2018. The accusation also included an inconsistent date of birth declared by Thanhawla in the election papers. Thanhawla made excuses and did not appear before the court in the first two summons in March and April 2018, as his counsel Remsanga Nghaka reported "personal problems." Chhangte also filed a case to the Anti-Corruption Bureau (ACB) of Mizoram Police on 20 May 2018. The Vigilance Department, which was under Thanhawla, failed to issue permission for investigation.

On his first appearance before the court on 26 May, the Chief Judicial Magistrate Lalngaihmawia Zote acquitted Thanhawla regarding the age issue, as the period of verification for election had lapsed. On the case of land ownership, Thanhawla claimed that it was allotted to him by the Bengal government as a gift when Kolkata's New Town was expanded in 2011, and that ownership deeds were still officially uncertain in 2013 due to legal issues in that area. He then evaded several court summons under various excuses. On 3 October 2019, he appeared before the court again, and the case was dismissed due to lack of "evidence of mens rea." The court gave him the benefit of the doubt regarding the improper declaration of ownership as originally charged, but also declared that he was the legal owner of the land.

Political offices
Preceded by T. Sailo	Chief Minister of Mizoram; 5 May 1984 – 20 August 1986	Succeeded by Laldenga
Preceded by President's rule	Chief Minister of Mizoram; 24 January 1989 – 3 December 1998	Succeeded by Zoramthanga
Preceded by Zoramthanga	Chief Minister of Mizoram; 11 December 2008 – 14 December 2018	Succeeded by Zoramthanga
