= Mizo National Front =

Political party in India

- Abbreviation: MNF
- President: Zoramthanga
- Founder: Laldenga
- Founded: 1961; 65 years ago
- Headquarters: Zarkawt, Aizawl, Mizoram
- Youth wing: Mizo National Youth Front
- Women's wing: Mizo National Women Front
- Ideology: Mizo nationalism Christian right Zo Unification; Anti-CAA
- Political position: Right-wing
- Colours
- ECI status: State Party
- Alliance: NDA (2014-2023); (National level) (2025-Present) (Autonomous Councils): INC+ (2021-2025) (Autonomous Councils)
- Seats in Rajya Sabha: 0 / 245
- Seats in Lok Sabha: 0 / 543
- Seats in Mizoram Legislative Assembly: 10 / 40

Election symbol

Website
- mnfparty.org

The Mizo National Front (abbr. MNF) is a regional political party in Mizoram, India. MNF emerged from the Mizo National Famine Front, which was formed by Pu Laldenga to protest against the inaction of the Government of India towards the 1959 famine in the Mizo areas of the Assam state. It staged a major uprising in 1966, followed by years of underground activities. In 1986, it signed the Mizoram Accord with the Government of India, renouncing secession and violence. The MNF then began contesting elections and has formed state government in Mizoram three times. It is currently the state's opposition party, with its president, Zoramthanga, as the Former Chief Minister of Mizoram.

== Origin ==
In 1958, the Mizo Hills were devastated by the Mautam, a cyclic phenomenon where the flowering of bamboo plants result in a plague of crop-eating rats, in turn causing a famine.

Earlier in 1955, Mizo Cultural Society was formed, with Laldenga as its secretary. In March 1960, the name of the Mizo Cultural Society was changed to 'Mautam Front'. During the famine of 1959–1960, this society took lead in demanding relief and attracted the attention of all sections of the people. In September 1960, the Society adopted the name Mizo National Famine Front (MNFF). The MNFF gained considerable popularity as a large number of Mizo Youth assisted in transporting rice and other essential commodities to interior villages.

In 1966, the MNF started an armed rebellion demanding independence for Mizoram from India. At that time, Mizoram was still part of Assam. The MNF believed that they could not continue their movement without help from foreign power. Because Pakistan and China were rivals of India, the MNF approached them for assistance. In 1963, a delegation led by Laldenga crossed into what was then East Pakistan, now Bangladesh, through the Chittagong Hill Tracts. After meetings with Pakistan's ISI intelligence agency, the MNF received weapons, military training, and support camps in East Pakistan.

After the independence of Bangladesh, The MNF then shifted its camps from Bangladesh to the Arakan region of Myanmar with help from the Communist Party of Burma. Later, in 1972, the Pakistani Consul traveled from Rangoon to Arakan to meet Laldenga and arranged travel documents for MNF leaders to secretly travel from Myanmar to Pakistan using a special refugee flights.

== Underground movement ==
The MNFF, which was originally formed to help ease the immense sufferings of the people during the severe Mautam Famine in Mizoram, was converted into Mizo National Front (MNF) on 22 October 1961. The first OB leaders elected were, President Laldenga, Vice President JF Manliana, General Secy. R. Vanlawma, and Treasurer Rochhinga and the ways in which the Indian authority of the day handled the famine left the people disillusioned. The wave of secessionist and armed insurrection was running high among the Mizos. In 1966, MNF led a major uprising against the government, but failed to gain administrative control of the Mizo district. The secessionist movement held on for about two decades. During that time, they invaded Burma claiming Chin State and Tahan belong to Mizoram since most of the resident in Tahan are Mizo.

=== Peace settlement ===
This chapter of insurgency finally came to a close with the signing of the Mizoram Accord on 30 June 1986 between the underground government of the Mizo National Front and the Government of India. Under the terms of the peace accord, Mizoram was granted statehood in February 1987.

== Political party ==
In the resulting election, the Congress won, and the MNF would be in opposition until 1998. In 1990, Laldenga died, and was replaced by his former secretary and Finance Minister, Zoramthanga. In 1998 and 2003 MNF won the state assembly elections, and Zoramthanga was chief minister for 10 years. In the 2003 elections MNF won 21 out of 40 seats in the state assembly, and got 132 505 votes (31.66%). The party was routed by the Congress in the 2008 state election, winning just 3 seats. It contested the 2013 state elections in alliance with the Mizoram People's Conference, and won 5 seats to the Congress's 34. In the 2018 state assembly elections, the MNF won 26 seats and returned to government. The party lost power to the Zoram People's Movement during the 2023 state assembly elections.

== Role in the national elections ==
For the 2014 Lok Sabha elections, it formed an alliance called United Democratic Front with seven other parties including BJP, to contest the only seat in Mizoram. The MNF has been part of the National Democratic Alliance since 2014

== Election results ==
=== Mizoram Legislative Assembly ===
Year	Party leader	Seats won	Change in seats	Vote %	Vote swing	Outcome
1987	Laldenga	24 / 40	▲24	43.31%	New	Government
1989	Laldenga	14 / 40	▼10	35.29%	▼8.02%	Opposition
1993	Zoramthanga	14 / 40	Steady	40.41%	▲5.12%	Opposition
1998	Zoramthanga	21 / 40	▲7	24.99%	▼15.42%	Government
2003	Zoramthanga	21 / 40	Steady	31.69%	▲6.70%	Government
2008	Zoramthanga	3 / 40	▼18	30.65%	▼1.04%	Others
2013	Zoramthanga	5 / 40	▲2	28.65%	▼2.00%	Opposition
2018	Zoramthanga	26 / 40	▲21	37.70%	▲9.05%	Government
2023	Zoramthanga	10 / 40	▼16	35.10%	▼2.6%	Opposition

== List of Chief Ministers ==
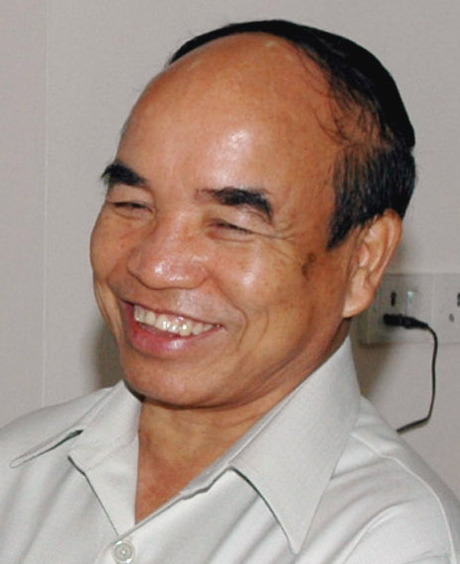
Zoramthanga, Party President and former Chief Minister of Mizoram.

List of Chief Ministers of Mizoram
Name	Tenure	Length
Laldenga	21 August 1986 – 7 September 1988	2 years, 17 days
Zoramthanga	3 December 1998 – 4 December 2003	15 years, 0 days
Zoramthanga	4 December 2003 – 11 December 2008	15 years, 0 days
Zoramthanga	15 December 2018 – 5 December 2023	15 years, 0 days

== Current Party Officers ==
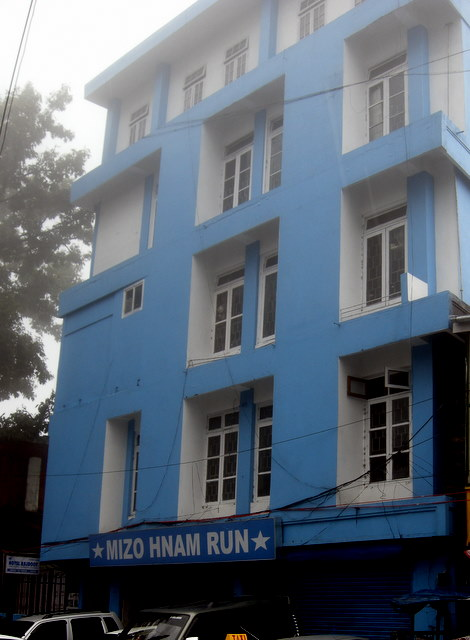
MNF Office

As of the latest party election in 2019, the officers are:

Current Party Officers
Position	Officer
President	Zoramthanga
Senior Vice President	Tawnluia
Vice Presidents	Vanlalzawma and Lalthlengliana
Treasurer	K. Vanlalauva

== See also ==
- Mizoram People's Conference
- Zoram Nationalist Party
- Zoram People's Movement
- Indian National Congress
- Political parties in Mizoram
- List of political parties in India
