= Mizoram People's Conference =

Political party in India

- President: Pu Vanlalruata
- Founded: 17 April 1975 (50 years ago)
- Headquarters: Treasury Square, Aizawl, Mizoram
- Ideology: Regionalism
- ECI Status: Unrecognised
- Seats in: 0 / 40

Election symbol

Website
- mizorampeoplesconference.com

The Mizoram People's Conference is a regional political party in Mizoram, India. It was formed by Brig Thenphunga Sailo on 17 April 1975. Ṭhenphunga was the party chairman and Chief Minister of Mizoram from 1979 to 1984, and an army officer and then a human rights activist before starting his political party.

Following the MPC's defeat in 1984, it was the main opposition party for the next two decades. In the 1998 assembly elections, the party formed a pre-poll coalition with the Mizo National Front. the Mizoram People's Conference won 12 seats and the Mizo National Front won 21 seats, enabling the two parties to formed a coalition government. The coalition fell in December 1999 after a secret agreement between the People's Conference and the Indian National Congress to fight the elections to the Village Council together.

However, in the 2003 elections, the party won only three seats, a number which fell to two in the 2008 elections and one in 2013. It ultimately won four seats in the 2018 election but left ZPM in June, 2019. Their MLAs quit to join Zoram People's Movement (ZPM).

It merged with the People's Representation for Identity and Status of Mizoram (PRISM) party as the People’s Conference Party.

== List of chief ministers ==
- T. Sailo
  - First term: 2 June 1978 to 10 November 1978
  - Second term: 8 May 1979 to 4 May 1984

== See also ==
- Mizo People's Conference (Progressive)
- Zoram People's Movement
