= List of Rajya Sabha members from Assam =

The Rajya Sabha (meaning the "Council of States") is the upper house of the Parliament of India. Assam elects 7 seats since 1956 (one more than 1952-1956). Members are indirectly elected by state legislators (elected politicians) of Assam. The number of the seven seats allocated to each party is proportional to the legislators' number at the time of nomination. Each party in Assam thus meeting a minimum quota of 1/7 of the local seats nominates a member; if a party has 2/7 to 3/7ths of the local seats those legislators select two members (and so forth).

Elections within the state legislatures are held using proportional representation via single transferable vote.

== Current members ==
Keys: BJP (4) UPPL (2) AGP (1)

#	Name	Party	Term start	Term end
1	Jogen Mohan	BJP	10-Apr-2026	09-Apr-2032
2	Terash Gowalla	BJP	10-Apr-2026	09-Apr-2032
3	Kanad Purkayastha	BJP	15-Jun-2025	14-Jun-2031
4	Pabitra Margherita	BJP	03-Apr-2022	02-Apr-2028
5	Pramod Boro	UPPL	10-Apr-2026	09-Apr-2032
6	Rwngwra Narzary	UPPL	03-Apr-2022	02-Apr-2028
7	Birendra Prasad Baishya	AGP	15-Jun-2025	14-Jun-2031

== Former members ==
- Star (*) Represents current Rajya Sabha members from as:

Name	Party	Term start	Term end	Term(s)	Notes
Jogen Mohan	BJP	10-Apr-2026	09-Apr-2032	1	
Terash Gowalla	BJP	10-Apr-2026	09-Apr-2032	1	
Pramod Boro	UPPL	10-Apr-2026	09-Apr-2032	1	
Kanad Purkayastha	BJP	15-Jun-2025	14-Jun-2031	1	
Birendra Prasad Baishya	AGP	15-Jun-2025	14-Jun-2031	3	
Rameswar Teli	BJP	28-Aug-2024	09-Apr-2026	1	by-election due to resignation of Sarbananda Sonowal
Mission Ranjan Das	BJP	28-Aug-2024	14-Jun-2025	1	by-election due to resignation of Kamakhya Prasad Tasa
Pabitra Margherita	BJP	03-Apr-2022	02-Apr-2028	1	
Rwngwra Narzary	UPPL	03-Apr-2022	02-Apr-2028	1	
Sarbananda Sonowal	BJP	27-Sep-2021	04-Jun-2024	1	elected to Dibrugarh Assembly by-election due to resignation of Biswajit Daimary
Bhubaneshwar Kalita	BJP	10-Apr-2020	09-Apr-2026	5	
Biswajit Daimary	BPF	10-Apr-2020	02-May-2021	3	elected to Panery Assembly
Ajit Kumar Bhuyan	Ind	10-Apr-2020	09-Apr-2026	1	
Kamakhya Prasad Tasa	BJP	15-Jun-2019	04-Jun-2024	1	elected to Kaziranga Lok Sabha
Birendra Prasad Baishya	AGP	15-Jun-2019	14-Jun-2025	2	
Ripun Bora	INC	03-Apr-2016	02-Apr-2022	1	
Ranee Narah	INC	03-Apr-2016	02-Apr-2022	1	
Bhubaneshwar Kalita	INC	10-Apr-2014	05-Aug-2019	4	resigned
Sanjaya Sinh	INC	10-Apr-2014	30-Jul-2019	1	resigned
Biswajit Daimary	BPF	10-Apr-2014	09-Apr-2020	2	
Manmohan Singh	INC	15-Jun-2013	14-Jun-2019	5	
Santiuse Kujur	INC	15-Jun-2013	14-Jun-2019	1	
Pankaj Bora	INC	16-Dec-2011	02-Apr-2016	1	by-election due to death of Silvius Condpan
Naznin Faruque	INC	03-Apr-2010	02-Apr-2016	1	
Silvius Condpan	INC	03-Apr-2010	10-Oct-2011	2	death
Bhubaneshwar Kalita	INC	10-Apr-2008	09-Apr-2014	3	
Birendra Prasad Baishya	AGP	10-Apr-2008	09-Apr-2014	1	
Biswajit Daimary	BPF	10-Apr-2008	09-Apr-2014	1	
Manmohan Singh	INC	15-Jun-2007	14-Jun-2013	4	
Kumar Deepak Das	AGP	15-Jun-2007	14-Jun-2013	1	
Anwara Taimur	INC	03-Apr-2004	02-Apr-2010	1	
Silvius Condpan	INC	03-Apr-2004	02-Apr-2010	1	
Karnendu Bhattacharjee	INC	10-Apr-2002	09-Apr-2008	1	
Dwijendra Nath Sharmah	INC	10-Apr-2002	09-Apr-2008	1	
Urkhao Gwra Brahma	Ind	10-Apr-2002	09-Apr-2008	1	
Manmohan Singh	INC	15-Jun-2001	14-Jun-2007	3	
Indramoni Bora	BJP	15-Jun-2001	14-Jun-2007	1	
Joyasree Goswami Mahanta	AGP	24-Aug-1999	14-Jun-2001	1	by-election due to death of Parag Chaliha
Arun Kumar Sarmah	AGP	03-Apr-1998	02-Apr-2004	1	
Drupad Borgohain	CPI	03-Apr-1998	02-Apr-2004	1	
Karnendu Bhattacharjee	INC	10-Apr-1996	09-Apr-2002	1	
Basanti Sarma	INC	10-Apr-1996	09-Apr-2002	2	
Prakanta Warisa	ASDC	10-Apr-1996	09-Apr-2002	1	
Parag Chaliha	AGP	15-Jun-1995	22-Jun-1999	1	death
Manmohan Singh	INC	15-Jun-1995	14-Jun-2001	2	
Matang Sinh	INC	03-Apr-1992	02-Apr-1998	1	
Tara Charan Majumdar	Ind	03-Apr-1992	02-Apr-1998	1	
Manmohan Singh	INC	01-Oct-1991	14-Jun-1995	1	by-election due to disqualification of Amritlal Basumatary
Basanti Sarma	INC	03-Sep-1991	09-Apr-1996	1	by-election due to death of Dinesh Goswami
Bhadreswar Buragohain	AGP	10-Apr-1990	09-Apr-1996	1	
Dinesh Goswami	AGP	10-Apr-1990	02-Jun-1991	2	death
Bhubaneshwar Kalita	INC	10-Apr-1990	09-Apr-1996	2	
Amritlal Basumatary	IC(S)	15-Jun-1989	01-Aug-1991	1	disqualified
David Ledger	AGP	15-Jun-1989	14-Jun-1995	1	
Nagen Saikia	AGP	03-Apr-1986	02-Apr-1992	1	
Bijoya Chakravarty	AGP	03-Apr-1986	02-Apr-1992	1	
Prithibi Majhi	INC	10-Apr-1984	09-Apr-1990	1	
Kamalendu Bhattacharjee	INC	10-Apr-1984	09-Apr-1990	1	
Bhubaneshwar Kalita	INC	10-Apr-1984	09-Apr-1990	1	
Baharul Islam	INC	15-Jun-1983	14-Jun-1989	3	
Dharanidhar Basumatari	INC	15-Jun-1983	14-Jun-1989	1	
Biswa Goswami	JP	03-Apr-1980	02-Apr-1986	1	
Bijoy Krishna Handique	INC	03-Apr-1980	02-Apr-1986	1	
Tilok Gogoi	INC	20-Jul-1977	02-Apr-1980	1	by-election due to resignation of D. K. Barooah
Robin Kakati	JP	10-Apr-1978	09-Apr-1984	2	
Ajit Kumar Sharma	JP	10-Apr-1978	09-Apr-1984	1	
Dinesh Goswami	INC	10-Apr-1978	09-Apr-1984	1	
Bipinpal Das	INC	03-Apr-1976	02-Apr-1982	1	
Syed Abdul Malik	INC	03-Apr-1976	02-Apr-1982	1	
D. K. Barooah	INC	03-Apr-1974	21-Mar-1977	2	elected to Nagaon Lok Sabha
Sriman Prafulla Goswami	INC	03-Apr-1974	02-Apr-1980	2	
D. K. Barooah	INC	19-Jul-1973	02-Apr-1974	1	
Mahendra Mohan Choudhry	INC	19-Jun-1972	02-Apr-1974	2	by-election due to resignation of Baharul Islam
Bijoy Chandra Bhagavati	INC	10-Apr-1972	09-Apr-1978	1	
Nabin Chandra Buragohain	INC	10-Apr-1972	09-Apr-1978	1	
Nripati Ranjan Choudhury	INC	10-Apr-1972	09-Apr-1978	1	
Emonsing M Sangma	INC	03-Apr-1970	02-Apr-1976	2	
Bipinpal Das	INC	03-Apr-1970	02-Apr-1976	1	
Baharul Islam	INC	03-Apr-1968	20-Jan-1972	2	resigned
Golap Borbora	SSP	03-Apr-1968	02-Apr-1974	1	
Sriman Prafulla Goswami	INC	04-May-1967	02-Apr-1972	1	by-election due to resignation of Fakhruddin Ali Ahmed
Emonsing M Sangma	INC	04-May-1967	02-Apr-1970	1	by-election due to resignation of A Thanglura
Usha Barthakur	INC	03-Apr-1966	02-Apr-1972	1	
Fakhruddin Ali Ahmed	INC	03-Apr-1966	25-Feb-1967	2	elected to Barpeta Lok Sabha
Mahitosh Purakayastha	INC	03-Apr-1966	21-Mar-1972	1	resigned
Purnananda Chetia	INC	03-Apr-1964	02-Apr-1970	1	
A Thanglura	INC	03-Apr-1964	02-Feb-1967	1	elected to Aizwal West Assembly
A. Thanglura	INC	20-Jun-1962	02-Apr-1964	1	by-election due to resignation of Joy Bhadra Hagjer
Baharul Islam	INC	03-Apr-1962	02-Apr-1968	1	
Robin Kakati	INC	03-Apr-1962	02-Apr-1968	1	
Bedavati Buragohain	INC	03-Apr-1960	02-Apr-1966	2	
Lila Dhar Barooah	INC	03-Apr-1960	02-Apr-1966	2	
Suresh Chandra Deb	INC	03-Apr-1960	02-Apr-1966	2	
Lila Dhar Barooah	INC	27-Aug-1958	02-Apr-1960	1	by-election due to resignation of Mahendra Mohan Choudhry
Joy Bhadra Hagjer	INC	03-Apr-1958	17-Mar-1962	1	resigned
Maulana Tayyebulla	INC	03-Apr-1958	02-Apr-1964	2	
Suresh Chandra Deb	INC	03-May-1957	02-Apr-1960	1	by-election due to resignation of Fakhruddin Ali Ahmed
Mahendra Mohan Choudhry	INC	01-Dec-1956	09-Apr-1958	1	elected to Hajo–Sualkuchi Assembly new seat added after States Reorganisation Act, 1956
Purna Chandra Sharma	INC	03-Apr-1956	02-Apr-1962	1	
Pushpalata Das	INC	03-Apr-1956	02-Apr-1962	2	
Bedavati Buragohain	INC	03-Apr-1954	02-Apr-1960	1	
Fakhruddin Ali Ahmed	INC	03-Apr-1954	25-Mar-1957	1	elected to Jania Assembly
Raymond Thanhlira	INC	03-Apr-1952	02-Apr-1958	1	
Maulana Tayyebulla	INC	03-Apr-1952	02-Apr-1958	1	
Pushpalata Das	INC	03-Apr-1952	02-Apr-1956	1	
Mohammad Roufique	Ind	03-Apr-1952	02-Apr-1956	1	
Surya Kumar Bhuyan	INC	03-Apr-1952	02-Apr-1954	1	
Lakshesvar Borooah	INC	03-Apr-1952	02-Apr-1954	1	
