= 1952 Assam Legislative Assembly election =

Indian state election

- 27 March 1952

All 105 seats to the Assam Legislative Assembly 53 seats needed for a majority
- Turnout: 49.42%
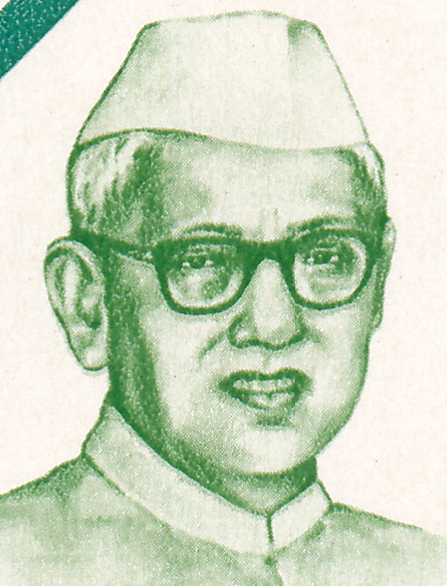
| | First party |
|---|---|---|
| Leader | Bishnu Ram Medhi |
| Party | INC |
| Leader's seat | Hajo |
| Seats before | New | - |
| Seats won | 76 |
| Seat change | New |
| Popular vote | 10,64,850 |
| Percentage | 43.48% |
CM before election
Bishnu Ram Medhi
INC
Elected CM
Bishnu Ram Medhi
INC

Indian administrative divisions, as of 1951

Elections to the Assam Legislative Assembly were held on 27 March 1952. This election was officially known as the 1951 Assam Legislative Assembly election, even though actual voting didn't take place until early 1952 because of delays.

== Constituencies ==
The Assam Legislative Assembly in 1952 consisted of 81 single-member constituencies and 13 double-member constituencies. A total of 590 nominations were filed out of which 61 were rejected and 74 were withdrawn, thus a total of 455 candidates contested the first legislative assembly elections in Assam.

== Political parties ==
9 national parties along with 10 registered unrecognized parties took part in the assembly election. The Indian National Congress contested 92 seats and won 76. Independent candidates won 14 seats while no other party crossed double-digits.

== Results ==
| Party | Popular vote | | Seats | |
| Party | Vote | % | Contested | Won |
|---|---|---|---|---|
| Indian National Congress | 1,064,850 | 43.48 | 92 | 76 |
| Socialist Party | 3,25,690 | 13.30 | 61 | 4 |
| Kisan Mazdoor Praja Party | 1,46,792 | 5.99 | 40 | 1 |
| Communist Party of India | 69,431 | 2.84 | 18 | 1 |
| Mizo Union | 29,104 | 1.19 | 3 | 3 |
| Khasi-Jaintia Durbar | 24,248 | 0.99 | 4 | 1 |
| All People's Party | 14,930 | 0.61 | 3 | 1 |
| Garo National Council | 14,577 | 0.60 | 4 | 3 |
| Khasi Jaintia Federated State National Conference | 9,441 | 0.39 | 1 | 1 |
| Independent | 6,93,908 | 28.34 | 213 | 14 |
| Total | 49,55,390 | 100 | — | 105 |

The Indian National Congress won a comfortable majority with 76 seats and formed the government under Bishnuram Medhi, who began his first term as Chief Minister. Kuladhar Chaliha was elected the Speaker of the Assembly.

== Elected members ==
| Constituency | Member | Party |
|---|---|---|
| Lungleh | R. Dengthuama | Mizo Union |
| Aijal East | Pu. Raymond Thanlihra | Mizo Union |
| Aijal West | Pu. Ch. Saprawnga | Mizo Union |
| Ratabari Patharkandi | Baidyanath Mookerjee | Indian National Congress |
| Ratabari Patharkandi | Ramesh Chandra Das Chowdhury | Indian National Congress |
| Patharkandi Karimganj | Maulavi Mahmud Ali | Indian National Congress |
| Badarpur | Maulana Abdul Jalil | Indian National Congress |
| Katigora | Barbhuiya, Namwar Ali | Indian National Congress |
| Lakhipur | Dhubi, Raghunandan | Indian National Congress |
| Lakhipur | Chaubey, Ram Prasad | Indian National Congress |
| Barkhola | Nath, Raichand | Indian National Congress |
| Silchar | Laskar, Mehrab Ali | Independent |
| Silchar Sonai | Choudhury, Moinul Haque | Indian National Congress |
| Sonai | Sinha, Nanda Kishore | Indian National Congress |
| Hailakandi Silchar | Hem Chandra Chakravarty | Indian National Congress |
| Hailakandi | Abdul Matlib Mazumdar | Indian National Congress |
| Katlicherra | Gourishankar Roy | Indian National Congress |
| Shillong | J. J. M. Nicholas Roy | Indian National Congress |
| Jowai | U. Kistobinu Rymbai | Independent |
| Nongstoin | Ajra Singh Khongphai | Independent |
| Nongpoh | A. Alley M. | Khasi Jaintia Federated State National Conference |
| Cherra | Maham Singh | Khasi Jaintia Darbar |
| North Cachar Hills | Hagjer, Joy Bhadra | Independent |
| Mikir Hills West | Rongpher, Nihang | Indian National Congress |
| Mikir Hills East | Terang, Khorsing | Indian National Congress |
| Baghmara | Harison Momin | Garo National Council |
| Tura | Emerson Momin | Garo National Council |
| Phulbari | Sangma, Emonsing | Independent |
| Dainadubi | Aaram Sangma | Garo National Council |
| Mankachar | Kobad Hussain Ahmed | Indian National Congress |
| South Salmara | Md. Sahadatali Mandal | Independent |
| Dhubri | Tamizuddin Prodhani | Independent |
| Golakganj | Santosh Kumar Barua | Indian National Congress |
| Gossaigaon | Jatindra Narayan Das | Indian National Congress |
| Kokrajhar | Sidli | Raja Ajit Narayan Deb | Independent |
| Kokrajhar | Sidli | Rupnath Brahma | Indian National Congress |
| Bilasipara | Md. Umaruddin | Independent |
| Bijni | Swami Krishnananda Brahmachari | Indian National Congress |
| North Salmara | Das, Hareswar | Indian National Congress |
| Goalpara | Hakim Chandra Rabha | Indian National Congress |
| Goalpara | Nath, Khagendranath | Indian National Congress |
| Sorbhog | Akshoy Kumar Das | Indian National Congress |
| Tarabari | Pahar Khan | Independent |
| Barpeta West | Mukhtar Ali | Independent |
| Barpeta North East | Mahadeb Das | Indian National Congress |
| Barpeta North East | Mahendra Mohan Choudhury | Indian National Congress |
| Patacharkuchi Barama | Homeswar Deb Chaudhuri | Socialist Party |
| Patacharkuchi Barama | Baikunthanath Das | Indian National Congress |
| Nalbari South | Prafulla Chandra Goswami | Indian National Congress |
| Nalbari North | Prabhat Chandra Goswami | Indian National Congress |
| Rangiya | Siddhinath Sarma | Indian National Congress |
| Rangiya | Dharanidhar Basumatari | Indian National Congress |
| Kamalpur | Mohendranath Deka | Independent |
| Hajo | Bishnuram Medhi | Indian National Congress |
| Boko | Radha Charan Choudhury | Indian National Congress |
| Palasbari | Horeswar Goswami | Indian National Congress |
| Pub Bangsar Silasundari Ghopa | Radhikaram Das | Indian National Congress |
| Gauhati | Gaurishankar Bhattacharya | Communist Party of India |
| Mangaldai | Purandar Sarma | Indian National Congress |
| Kalaigaon | Dandi Ram Dutta | Socialist Party |
| Panery | Davidson Bhabora | Indian National Congress |
| Dhekiajuli North | Omeo Kumar Das | Indian National Congress |
| Dhekiajuli South | Mohi Kanta Das | Indian National Congress |
| Tezpur North | Biswadev Sarma | Indian National Congress |
| Tezpur South | Kamla Prasad Agarwalla | Indian National Congress |
| Sootea | Bijoy Chandra Bhagabati | Indian National Congress |
| Gohpur | Gahan Chandra Goswami | Indian National Congress |
| Laharighat | Mohammed Rofique | Independent |
| Marigaon | Dhing | Bora, Motiram | Indian National Congress |
| Marigaon | Dhing | Das, Beliram | Indian National Congress |
| Nowgong | Raha | Sarma, Pratap Chandra | Indian National Congress |
| Nowgong | Raha | Hazarika, Mahendra | Indian National Congress |
| Jamunamukh | Bara, Bimala Kanta | Indian National Congress |
| Samaguri | Barthakur, Usha | Indian National Congress |
| Kaliabar | Bara, Lila Kanta | Indian National Congress |
| Rupahihat | Mohammed Idris | Indian National Congress |
| Golaghat East | Barua, Rajendranath | Indian National Congress |
| Golaghat West | Pegu, Mal | Indian National Congress |
| Golaghat West | Kheria, Chanoo | Indian National Congress |
| Dergaon | Rajkhowa, Debeswar | Indian National Congress |
| Jorhat South | Chaliha, Kuladhar | Indian National Congress |
| Jorhat North | Nilmani Phookan | Indian National Congress |
| Jorhat North | Ramnath Das | Indian National Congress |
| Titabor | Sarju Prasad Singh | All People's Party |
| Teok | Harinarayan Baruah | Indian National Congress |
| Amguri | Kakoti, Rabin | Indian National Congress |
| Sibsagar | Gogoi, Girindranath | Indian National Congress |
| Nazira | Bezbarua, Ananda Chandra | Indian National Congress |
| Nazira Sonari | Gogoi, Thanuram | Indian National Congress |
| Sonari | Chetia, Purnananda | Indian National Congress |
| Bihpuria | Sarveswar Boruwa | Indian National Congress |
| North Lakhimpur | Karka Doley | Indian National Congress |
| North Lakhimpur | Hem Chandra Hazarika | Indian National Congress |
| Moran | Gogoi, Ghana Kanta | Independent |
| Dibrugarh West | Ali, Faiznur | Indian National Congress |
| Dibrugarh East | Barooah, Ramesh Chandra | Indian National Congress |
| Tinsukia North | Khaund, Indreswar | Indian National Congress |
| Tinsukia South | Bhuyan, Jadunath | Indian National Congress |
| Bordubi | Das, Manik Chandra | Indian National Congress |
| Jaipur | Barua, Jago Kanta | Indian National Congress |
| Doom Dooma | Chowdhury, Harihar | Indian National Congress |
| Digboi | Lohar, Dalbir Singh | Indian National Congress |
| Digboi | Khakhlari, Jadav Chandra | Indian National Congress |

== See also ==
- 1951–52 elections in India
- Elections in Assam
