= 2004 Rajya Sabha elections =

Elections for the upper house of Indian Parliament

(of 228 seats) to the Rajya Sabha
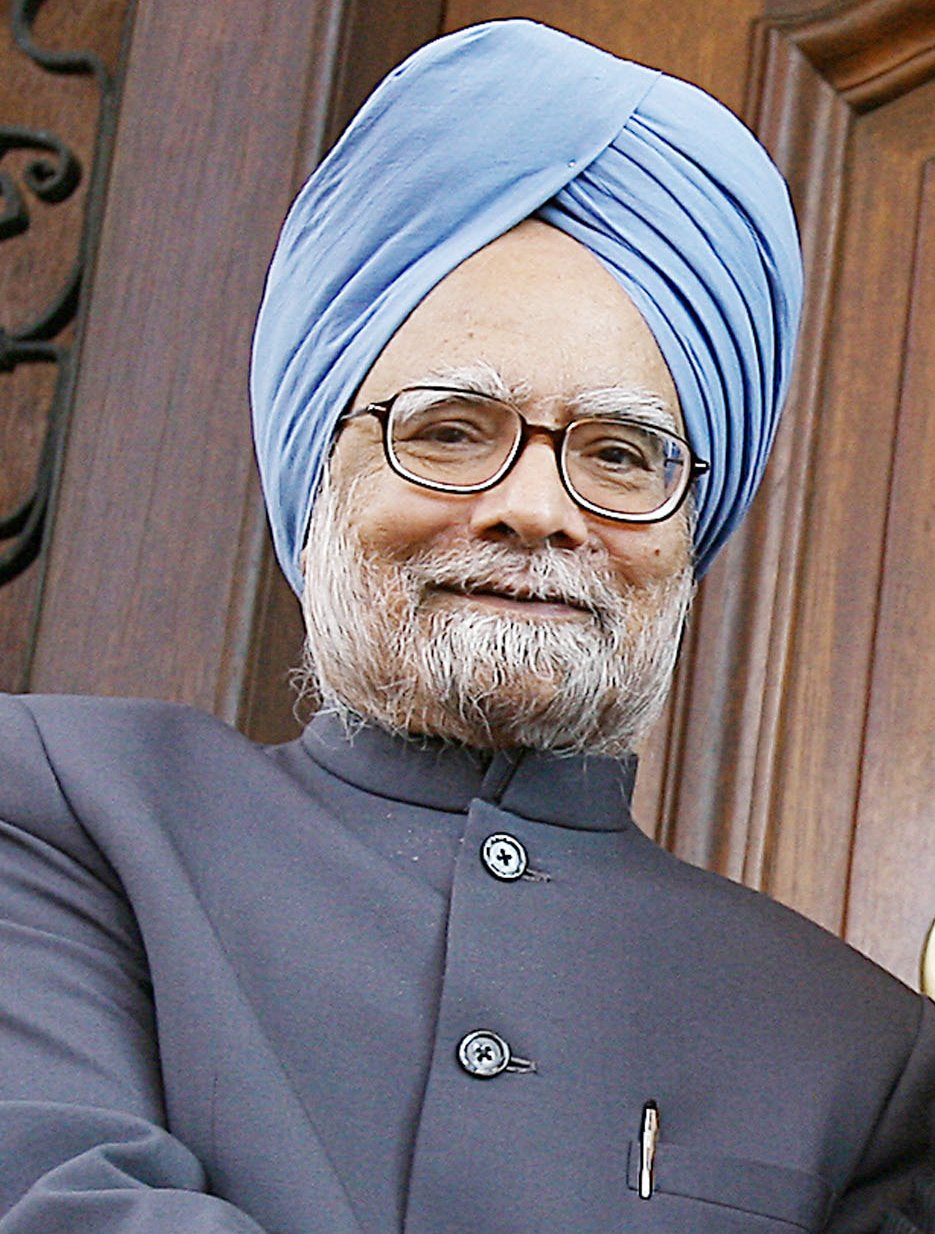

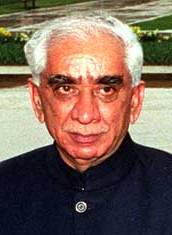
| | First party | Second party |
|---|---|---|
| Leader | Manmohan Singh | Jaswant Singh |
| Party | INC | BJP |

Rajya Sabha elections were held in 2004, to elect members of the Rajya Sabha, Indian Parliament's upper chamber. The elections were held to elect respectively 13 members from six states, 49 members from 12 states, six members from Andhra Pradesh, and two members from Haryana, for the Council of States, the Rajya Sabha.

== Elections ==
Elections were held in 2004 to elect members from various states. The list is incomplete.

=== Members elected ===
The following members are elected in the elections held in 2004. They are members for the term 2004–2010 and retire in year 2010, except in case of the resignation or death before the term.

State – Member – Party

Rajya Sabha members for term 2004–2010
| State | Member Name | Party | Remark |
|---|---|---|---|
| AS | Silvius Condpan | INC | R |
| AS | Syeda Anwara Taimur | INC | |
| HP | Anand Sharma | INC | |
| KL | P. V. Abdul Wahab | IUML | |
| KL | A. K. Antony | INC | |
| KL | A. Vijayaraghavan | CPM | |
| NG | Khekiho Zhimomi | INC | |
| TR | Matilal Sarkar | CPM | |
| PB | Ashwani Kumar | INC | |
| PB | Naresh Gujral | SAD | |
| PB | Dharam Pal Sabharwal | INC | |
| PB | Varinder Singh Bajwa | SAD | |
| PB | M S Gill | INC | |
| CG | Nand Kumar Sai | BJP | |
| CG | Mohsina Kidwai | INC | |
| MP | Anil Madhav Dave | BJP | |
| MP | Pyarelal Khandelwal | BJP | Dea 6.10.2009 |
| MP | Su. Thirunavukkarasar | BJP | Res.11.2009 |
| TN | Anbumani Ramadoss | PMK | |
| TN | S. Anbalagan | ADMK | |
| TN | N. R. Govindarajar | ADMK | |
| TN | T. T. V. Dhinakaran | ADMK | |
| TN | K. Malaisamy | ADMK | |
| TN | E. M. Sudarsana Natchiappan | INC | |
| KA | Oscar Fernandes | INC | |
| KA | M. Venkaiah Naidu | BJP | |
| KA | M. A. M. Ramaswamy | JDS | |
| KA | B. K. Hariprasad | INC | |
| OR | Bhagirathi Majhi | BJP | |
| OR | Pyarimohan Mohapatra | BJD | |
| OR | Radhakant Nayak | INC | |
| MH | Tariq Anwar | NCP | |
| MH | Sharad Joshi | SBP | |
| MH | Shivraj Patil | INC | Res 21.01.2010 |
| MH | Vijay J. Darda | INC | |
| MH | Sanjay Raut | SS | |
| MH | Rahul Bajaj | IND | |
| MH | Pramod Mahajan | BJP | dea 03/05/2006 |
| PB | Ambika Soni | INC | |
| PB | Raj Mohinder Singh | SAD | |
| RJ | Lalit Kishore Chaturvedi | BJP | |
| RJ | Najma Heptulla | BJP | |
| RJ | Santosh Bagrodia | INC | |
| RJ | Narendra Budania | INC | Bye 2009 |
| RJ | Jaswant Singh | BJP | res 16/05/2009 LS |
| UP | Arun Shourie | BJP | |
| UP | Kamal Akhtar | SP | |
| UP | Nand Kishore | SP | |
| UP | Jaya Bachchan | SP | |
| UP | Bhagwati Singh | SP | |
| UP | Ram Narayan Sahu | SP | |
| UP | Amir Alam Khan | SP | |
| UP | Brij Bhushan | SP | |
| UP | Murli Manohar Joshi | BJP | res 23/04/2009 LS |
| UP | Shriram Pal | BSP | ele 19/06/2009 |
| UP | Satish Chandra Mishra | BSP | |
| UP | Ambeth Rajan | BSP | |
| UK | Satish Sharma | INC | |
| BR | George Fernandes | JDU | |
| BR | Motiur Rahman | RJD | |
| BR | Sharad Yadav | JDU | 16/05/2009 LS |
| BR | Jai Narain Prasad Nishad | BJP | |
| BR | Subhash Prasad Yadav | RJD | |
| BR | R K Dhawan | INC | |
| JH | Dhiraj Prasad Sahu | INC | |
| JH | Hemant Soren | JMM | res 4.1.2010 |
| AP | Jairam Ramesh | INC | |
| AP | N. Janardhana Reddy | INC | |
| AP | Jesudasu Seelam | INC | |
| AP | V. Hanumantha Rao | INC | |
| AP | Gireesh Kumar Sanghi | INC | |
| AP | Penumalli Madhu | CPM | |
| HR | Ajay Singh Chautala | INLD | Res 03.11.2009 |
| HR | Tarlochan_Singh | IND | |

== Bye-elections ==
The following bye elections were held in the year 2004.

State – Member – Party

- Bye-elections were held on 21/06/2004 for vacancy from Andhra and Punjab due to death of seating members K. M. Khan on 16/10/2003 with term ending on 02/04/2006 and Gurcharan Singh on 01/04/2004, with term ending on 09/04/2008.
- Bye-elections were held on 21/06/2004 for vacancy from Rajasthan due to death of seating member Dr Abrar Ahmed on 04/05/2004 with term ending on 09/04/2008.
- Bye-elections were held on 28/06/2004 for vacancy from Bihar due to election to Lok Sabha of seating members Rajiv Ranjan Singh on 13/05/2004 with term ending on 02/04/2006 and Lalu Prasad on 13/05/2004 with term ending on 09/04/2008.
- Bye-elections were held on 28/06/2004 for vacancy from Madhya pradesh and West Bengal due to election to Lok Sabha of seating members Kailash Chandra on 13/05/2004 with term ending on 02/04/2006 and Pranab Mukherjee on 13/05/2004 with term ending on 18/08/2005.
- Bye-elections were held on 28/06/2004 for vacancy from Orissa due to election to Lok Sabha of seating members Manamohan Samal on 13/05/2004 with term ending on 03/04/2006.
- Bye-elections were held on 28/06/2004 for vacancy from Delhi due to resignation of seating members Ambika Soni on 10 June 2004 with term ending on 27 January 2006 and Dr A R Kidwai on 7 July 2004 with term ending on 27 January 2006.
- Bye-elections were held on 06/01/2005 for vacancy from Kerala due to death of seating members V. V. Raghavan on 27/10/2004 with term ending on 01/07/2006.
