= 2010 Rajya Sabha elections =

Elections for the upper house of Indian Parliament

73 seats to the Rajya Sabha (Note: Including 3 casual vacancies)
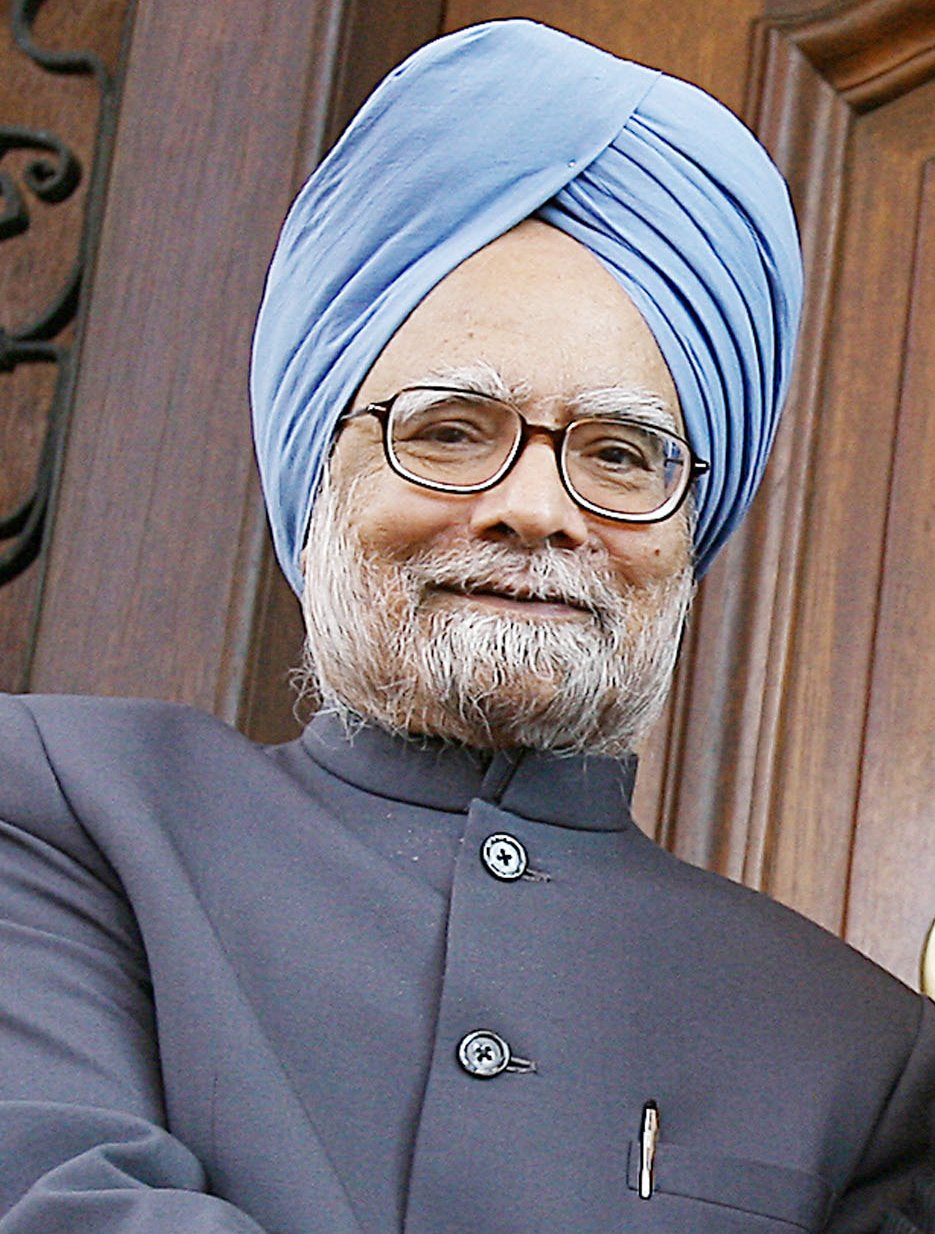

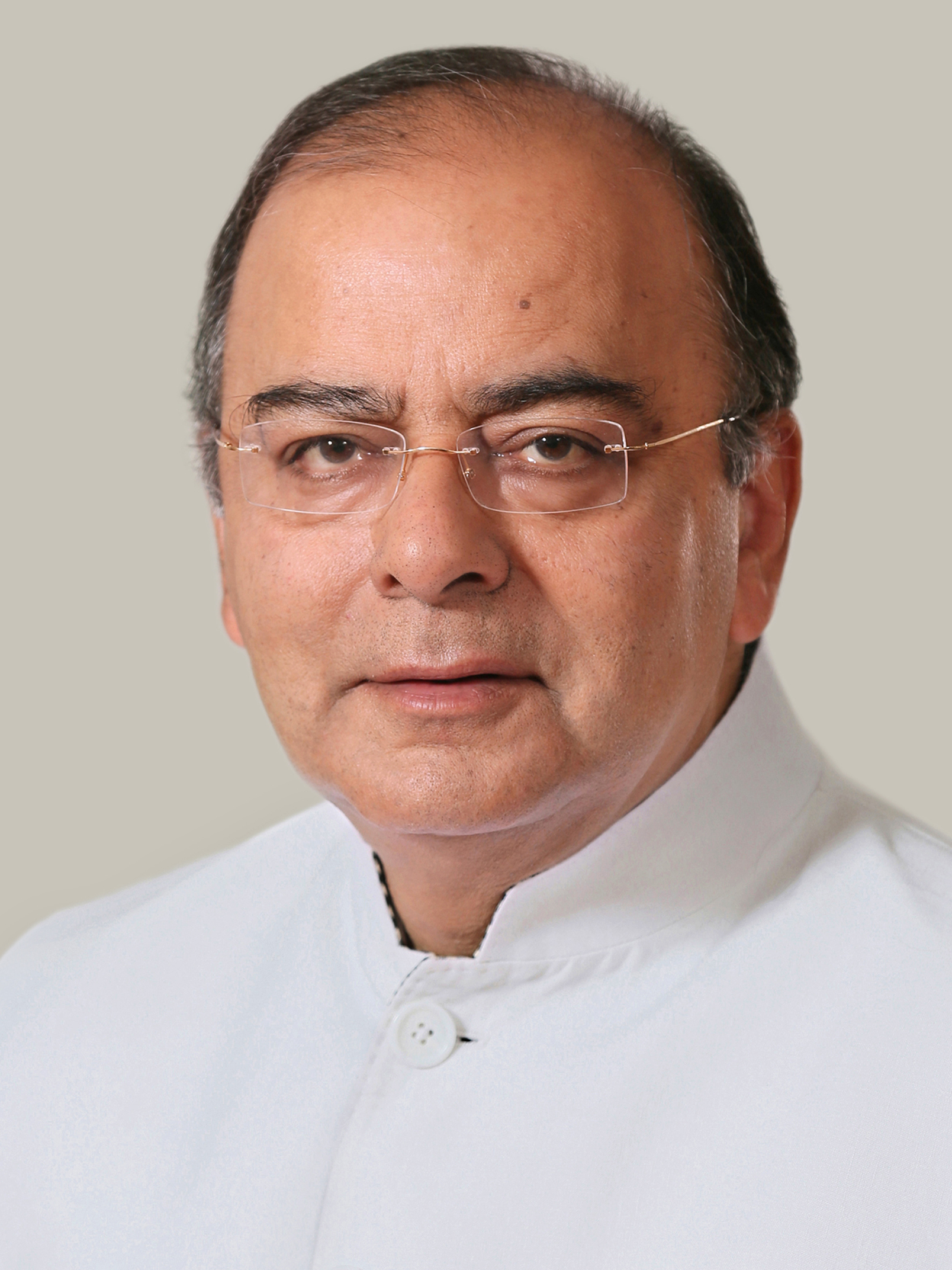
| | First party | Second party |
|---|---|---|
| Leader | Manmohan Singh | Arun Jaitley |
| Party | INC | BJP |

Rajya Sabha elections were held on various dates in 2010, to elect members of the Rajya Sabha, Indian Parliament's upper chamber. The elections were held to elect respectively 13 members from 6 states, 49 members from 12 states, six members from Andhra Pradesh and two members from Haryana for the Council of States, the Rajya Sabha.

== March Elections ==
Elections were held to elect members from various states.

=== Members elected ===
The following members are elected in the elections held in 2010. The list is incomplete.

=== Assam ===
| Seat No | Previous MP | Previous Party | Elected MP | Elected Party | Reference |
|---|---|---|---|---|---|
| 1 | Silvius Condpan | Congress | Silvius Condpan | Congress | |
| 2 | Syeda Anwara Taimur | Congress | Naznin Faruque | Congress | |

=== Himachal Pradesh ===
| Seat No | Previous MP | Previous Party | Elected MP | Elected Party | Reference |
|---|---|---|---|---|---|
| 1 | Anand Sharma | Congress | Bimla Kashyap Sood | BJP | |

=== Kerala ===
| Seat No | Previous MP | Previous Party | Elected MP | Elected Party | Reference |
|---|---|---|---|---|---|
| 1 | A. K. Antony | Congress | A. K. Antony | Congress | |
| 2 | P. V. Abdul Wahab | IUML | K.N. Balagopal | CPI(M) | |
| 3 | A. Vijayaraghavan | CPI(M) | T N Seema | CPI(M) | |

=== Nagaland ===
| Seat No | Previous MP | Previous Party | Elected MP | Elected Party | Reference |
|---|---|---|---|---|---|
| 1 | Khekiho Zhimomi | NPF | Khekiho Zhimomi | NPF | |

=== Tripura ===
| Seat No | Previous MP | Previous Party | Elected MP | Elected Party | Reference |
|---|---|---|---|---|---|
| 1 | Matilal Sarkar | CPI(M) | Jharna Das | CPI(M) | |

=== Punjab ===
| Seat No | Previous MP | Previous Party | Elected MP | Elected Party | Reference |
|---|---|---|---|---|---|
| 1 | M S Gill | Congress | M S Gill | Congress | |
| 2 | Ashwini Kumar | Congress | Ashwini Kumar | Congress | |
| 3 | Dharam Pal Sabharwal | Congress | Avinash Rai Khanna | BJP | |
| 4 | Varinder Singh Bajwa | SAD | Sukhdev Singh Dhindsa | SAD | |
| 5 | Naresh Gujral | SAD | Naresh Gujral | SAD | |

== June Elections ==
=== Andhra Pradesh ===
| Seat No | Previous MP | Previous Party | Elected MP | Elected Party | Reference |
|---|---|---|---|---|---|
| 1 | Jairam Ramesh | Congress | Jairam Ramesh | Congress | |
| 2 | N. Janardhana Reddy | Congress | N. Janardhana Reddy | Congress | |
| 3 | Jesudasu Seelam | Congress | Jesudasu Seelam | Congress | |
| 4 | V. Hanumantha Rao | Congress | V. Hanumantha Rao | Congress | |
| 5 | Gireesh Kumar Sanghi | Congress | Sujana Chowdary | TDP | |
| 6 | Penumalli Madhu | CPI(M) | Gundu Sudha Rani | TDP | |

=== Bihar ===
| Seat No | Previous MP | Previous Party | Elected MP | Elected Party | Reference |
|---|---|---|---|---|---|
| 1 | Ejaz Ali | JD(U) | Ramchandra Prasad Singh | JD(U) | |
| 2 | George Fernandes | JD(U) | Upendra Kushwaha | JD(U) | |
| 3 | Subhash Prasad Yadav | RJD | Ram Kripal Yadav | RJD | |
| 4 | Rajiv Pratap Rudy | BJP | Rajiv Pratap Rudy | BJP | |
| 5 | R. K. Dhawan | Congress | Ram Vilas Paswan | LJP | |

=== Chhattisgarh ===
| Seat No | Previous MP | Previous Party | Elected MP | Elected Party | Reference |
|---|---|---|---|---|---|
| 1 | Nand Kumar Sai | BJP | Nand Kumar Sai | BJP | |
| 2 | Mohsina Kidwai | Congress | Mohsina Kidwai | Congress | |

=== Haryana ===
| Seat No | Previous MP | Previous Party | Elected MP | Elected Party | Reference |
|---|---|---|---|---|---|
| 1 | Birender Singh | Congress | Birender Singh | Congress | |
| 2 | Tarlochan Singh | Independent | Ranbir Singh Gangwa | INLD | |

Rajya Sabha members for term 2010-2016
| State | Member Name | Party | Remark |
|---|---|---|---|
| JH | Dhiraj Prasad Sahu | INC | |
| JH | K. D. Singh | JMM | |
| KA | Oscar Fernandes | INC | |
| KA | M. Venkaiah Naidu | BJP | |
| KA | Aayanur Manjunath | BJP | |
| KA | Vijay Mallya | IND. | |
| MP | Anil Madhav Dave | BJP | |
| MP | Chandan Mitra | BJP | |
| MP | Vijayalaxmi Sadho | INC | |
| MH | Piyush Goyal | BJP | |
| MH | Ishwarlal Jain | BJP | |
| MH | Avinash Pande | INC | |
| MH | Vijay J. Darda | INC | |
| MH | Sanjay Raut | SS | |
| MH | Praful Patel | NCP | |
| OR | Baishnab Charan Parida | BJD | |
| OR | Pyarimohan Mohapatra | BJD | |
| OR | Shashi Bhusan Behera | BJD | |
| PB | Ambika Soni | INC | |
| PB | Balwinder Singh Bhunder | SAD | |
| RJ | Ashk Ali Tak | BJP | |
| RJ | Ram Jethmalani | BJP | |
| RJ | Vijayendrapal Singh | BJP | |
| RJ | Anand Sharma | INC | |
| TN | K. P. Ramalingam | DMK | |
| TN | S. Thangavelu | DMK | |
| TN | A. Navaneethakrishnan | ADMK | |
| TN | P. H. Paul Manoj Pandian | ADMK | |
| TN | A. W. Rabi Bernard | ADMK | |
| TN | E. M. Sudarsana Natchiappan | INC | |
| TG | Gundu Sudha Rani | TRS | |
| TG | V. Hanumantha Rao | INC | |
| UP | Mukhtar Abbas Naqvi | BJP | |
| UP | Vishambhar Prasad Nishad | SP | |
| UP | Kanak Lata Singh | SP | |
| UP | Arvind Kumar Singh | SP | |
| UP | Rasheed Masood | SP | res 09/03/2012 |
| UP | Satish Sharma | INC | |
| UP | Jugal Kishore | BSP | |
| UP | Narendra Kumar Kashyap | BSP | |
| UP | Salim Ansari | BSP | |
| UP | Rajpal Singh Saini | BSP | |
| UP | Satish Chandra Mishra | BSP | |
| UP | Ambeth Rajan | BSP | |
| UK | Tarun Vijay | BJP | |

== Bye-elections ==
The bye-elections were also held for the vacant seats from the State of Gujarat, Rajashthan, Uttar Pradesh.

=== Gujarat ===
- Bye-elections were held on 25 February 2010 for vacancy from Gujarat due to death of seating member of BJP.

| S.No | Former MP | Party | Date of Vacancy | Elected MP | Party | Date of appointment | Date of retirement |
|---|---|---|---|---|---|---|---|
| 1 | Suryakantbhai Acharya | BJP | 21 December 2009 | Pravin Naik | BJP | 25 February 2010 | 18 August 2011 |

=== Rajasthan ===
- Bye-elections were held on 17 June 2010 for vacancy from Rajasthan due to death of seating member of BJP.

| S.No | Former MP | Party | Date of Vacancy | Elected MP | Party | Date of appointment | Date of retirement |
|---|---|---|---|---|---|---|---|
| 1 | Krishan Lal Balmiki | BJP | 21 April 2010 | Narendra Budania | Congress | 17 June 2010 | 2 April 2012 |

=== Uttar Pradesh ===
- Bye-elections were held on 15 July 2010 for vacancy from Uttar Pradesh due to death of seating member of SP.

| S.No | Former MP | Party | Date of Vacancy | Elected MP | Party | Date of appointment | Date of retirement |
|---|---|---|---|---|---|---|---|
| 1 | Virendra Bhatia | SP | 24 May 2010 | Pramod Kureel | BSP | 15 July 2010 | 2 April 2012 |
