= Ch. Chhunga =

Indian politician (1922-1988)

Raltê Chalchhûnga

1st Chief Minister of Mizoram
- In office 3 May 1972 – 10 May 1977
- Lieutenant Governor: S. P. Mukherjee; S. K. Chibber
- Preceded by: Office Established
- Succeeded by: Thenphunga Sailo
- Constituency: Kolasib

President of Mizo Union
- In office 4 March 1952 – 28 October 1953
- Preceded by: Raymond Thanhlira
- Succeeded by: Raymond Thanhlira

President of Mizo Union
- In office 9 October 1955 – 8 October 1962
- Preceded by: Raymond Thanhlira
- Succeeded by: H.K. Bawichhuaka

President of Mizo Union
- In office 4 March 1964 – 1 October 1971
- Preceded by: H.K. Bawichhuaka
- Succeeded by: Ch. Saprawnga

Personal details
- Born: ChalChhûnga; November 12, 1922 Demagiri, Mizoram
- Died: 24 August 1988 (aged 65)
- Party: Mizo Union
- Spouse: Lalrothangi (m. 1948)
- Children: 11
- Nickname: Lawrence Ch. Chhûnga

Lawrence Ralte Chalchhûnga also known as Ch. Chhûnga (Note: variation of R.C. Chhûnga for Ralte Chalchhûnga) (12 November 1922 – 24 August 1988) was the first Chief Minister of Mizoram, a state in northeast India. He served as a Chief Minister under the Mizo Union, from 1972 to 1977.

== Early life ==
Ch. Chhûnga was born on 12 November 1922 at Tlabung. He was the only son of C.L. Thianga and Vanthangpuii. He studied in Kolasib for lower primary before settling in Aizawl for Boys' Middle English School. He studied in Shillong in 1938 at St. Anthony's High School. During his studies, the outbreak of World War II prompted Chhûnga to enlist in the Royal Indian Navy as a wireless Operator in July 1941. Under pressure from his parents, Chhûnga attempted to leave the military and was discharged after purposely failing all his exams. He continued his education at St. Anthony's and completed matric in 1943. During his studies, he fraternized with other tribal students and formed the Hill Students' Union and became politically active.

== Political life ==
Chhûnga showed interest in the newly formed Mizo Union party along with his friend H. Vanthuamawere. However, his father's expectations encouraged him to continue studying. In the Mizo Union General Assembly of 1951, Chhûnga was elected as President of the Mizo Union.

Following the Mizo District Council elections on 4 January 1952, Chhûnga was instructed to contest the seat of the North Vanlaiphai constituency. Chhûnga declined and instead contested the Aizawl-Lunglei constituency against Pachhunga of the United Mizo Freedom Organization. Chhûnga lost to Pachhunga with 787 votes to his 860. However, the Mizo Union succeeded overall and won 17 constituencies out of 18. As a result, Chhûnga was reelected as President of the Mizo Union party in 26–29 February 1952 during the assembly.

Following the resignation of Raymond Thanhlira due to nomination to parliament a by-election was held in 1952. The nomination committee selected Chhûnga as the Mizo Union candidate. Chhûnga was in Silchar completed his Bachelor of Arts. He had been nominated by Lalbuia, his agent, and this was a breach of nomination hence rejecting his candidacy. Lalbuia, who was uncontested, became the Member of Legislative Assembly. Upon Chhûnga's arrival, Lalbuia offered to resign and let him become the MLA. However, Chhûnga refused.

In the 1957 Mizo District Council election, Chhûnga contested against Pachhunga once more.

Chhûnga was the Chief Executive Member of Mizoram District Council, The United Mizo Parliamentary Party, a coalition of Mizo Union and Congress Party and dominated the 1971 Village Council elections by winning 66 of the 158 Village councils. Chhûnga was appointed the President of the Mizo Union in the 1952 General Assembly as the people preferred a young man instead of the much senior Bawichhuaka. Chhûnga held the Party president's post for 14 years during the 28 years of the Mizo Union's existence. Chhûnga won election in Kolasib (Vidhan Sabha constituency) and was appointed Chief Minister of the Union Territory of Mizoram by SP Mukherjee, the First Lt. Governor of Mizoram on 3 May 1972. Chhûnga was instrumental in the merger of Mizo Union with the Indian National Congress. The Mizo Union, being a regional party, depended on the center for funds and preferred to join with the Indian National Congress. Chhûnga was instrumental in Mizoram getting State status. He negotiated for separation of Mizoram District from Assam state.

== Later life ==
Chhûnga married Lalrothangi in 1948. He had 11 children and named them with the prefix "Chal".

== Notes ==
Preceded by Position established	Chief Minister of Mizoram; 3 May 1972 – 10 May 1977	Succeeded by T. Sailo
