= Ram Narayan Sahu =

Indian politician

Shri Ram Narayan Sahu is an Indian politician from BJP. In the 2004 Indian Rajya Sabha elections, he was elected as a Member of the Parliament of India representing Uttar Pradesh in the Rajya Sabha, the upper house of the Indian Parliament. His term was set for 2004–2010. He was not re-elected in the 2010 elections, although it is not clear if he ran again.
