= Liladhar =

Liladhar or Lila Dhar is an Indian name and may refer to:

- Liladhar Dake, Indian politician
- Liladhar Joshi, Indian politician
- Liladhar Kotoki, Indian politician
- Liladhar Vaghela, Indian politician
- Lila Dhar Barooah, Indian politician
