= Mizo Zirlai Pawl =

Student Association of Mizoram

- Mizo Students Association
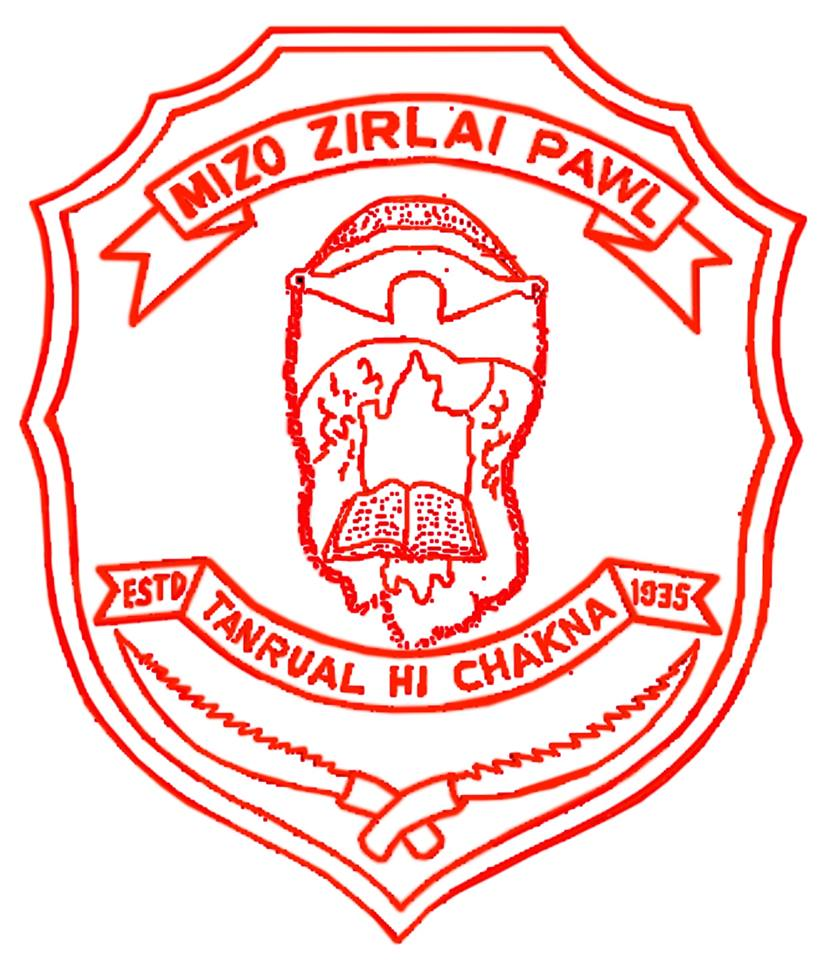
- Abbreviation: MZP
- Predecessor: Lushai Students Association
- Formation: 27 October 1935 (90yrs ago)
- Founder: R.Buchhawna B.A.
- Founded at: Shillong
- Type: NGO
- Headquarters: Aizawl, Mizoram
- Location: Treasury Square
- Region served: Zofa inhabitant area
- Services: Voluntary, pressure group
- Members: All mizo students
- Official language: Zo language (Zo Tawng)
- Affiliations: SR. 35 of 1969–70
- Website: mzpmizoram.com

Mizo Zirlai Pawl (lit. Mizo students' Association) is a Mizo multinational student organization and apex students body based in Mizoram state, India. Established on 27 October 1935 in Shillong by Mizo earlier educated students. Originally as the Lushai Students Association (LSA), which was later replaced with the "Mizo Zirlai Pawl" (Mizo Students Association) on 1 September 1946. As Mizoram State government notified MZP raising day 27 October was observed as "Zirlaite Ni" (Students' Day) from 2008 in Mizoram. It was registered as SR No. 35 of 1969–70 under Indian Societies Registration Act. Its general headquarters is in the state capital of Mizoram, Aizawl. And it has 12 headquarters inside and outside of Mizoram state, such as Churachandpur (in Manipur), Behliangchhip (in Tripura), and in Mizoram state - Serchhip, Biate, Champhai, Darlawn, Kolasib, Mamit, Zawlnuam, Saitual, Lunglei and Khawzawl. It has 50 Sub-Headquarters and many branches.

== Scope ==
The following Mizo (used as an umbrella term for all peoples who speak one of the Mizo languages) student organizations are affiliated to it:

- Lai Students' Association (LSA)
- Mizoram Bawm Students' Association (MBSA)
- Pang zirlai Pawl (PZP)
- Mara Students' Organization (MSO)
- Ranglong Students' Union (RSU)
- Thadou Students' Association (TSA)
- Siamsinpawlpi (SSPP)

It is itself a constituent unit of North-East Students' Organisation (NESO)

Most of College Students Union in Mizoram, Women Politechnic, Aizawl and Mizoram University Students Council; Chairman/Vice President and General Secretary is the Ex-Officio Member in General Headquarters.

In different parts of India, Cities and Institution based Mizo Students Association is also affiliated to Mizo Zirlai Pawl; like, Mizo Students Union Pune (MSUP), Delhi Mizo Zirlai Pawl (DMZP) and many more.

== History ==
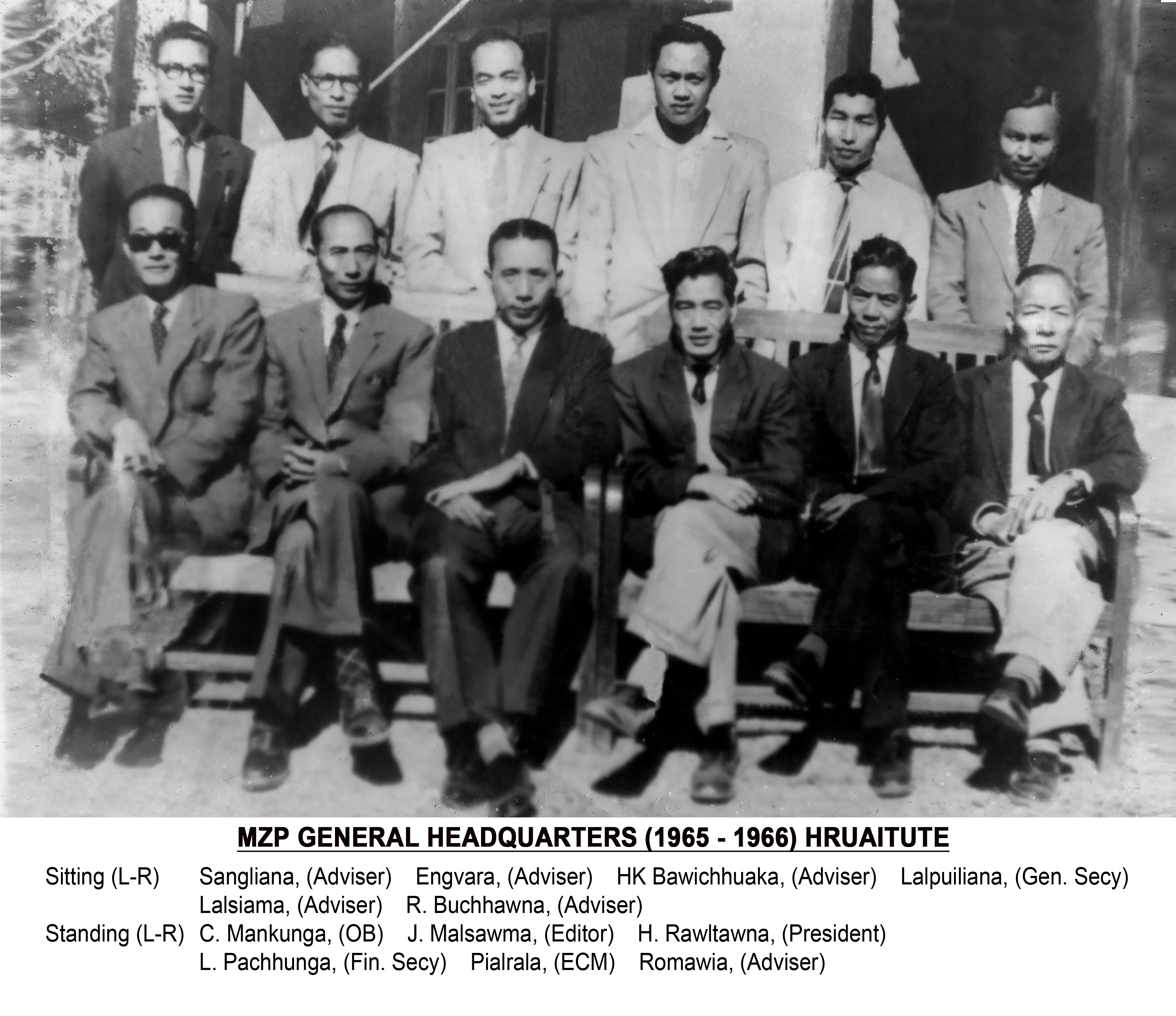
MZP General Headquarters Leaders (1965-1966)

The Lushai Students Association previously founded in 1926 at Shillong and which had almost collapsed was revived in October 1935. Its main objectives were to look after the welfare of the Lushai Students, to prepare them to become leaders of future, and to preserve the Lushai traditional and cultural values. At the first general elections held on 24 October 1939, Buchhawn was elected as its president, Lalhmuaka as its general secretary, Hrawva as its treasurer and Saptea as its student secretary. The general meeting at Aizawl on 1 September 1946 had changed its name into Mizo Zirlai Pawl (MZP) and shifted its base from Shillong to Aizawl.

The association was established on 27 October 1935.

Brief Chronicle of MZP
| 1926 | Lushai Students Association was formed in Calcutta, Gauhati and Shillong. Unfortunately, the organisation collapsed and ceased to exist. |
| 1935 | Lushai Students Association was again newly established in Shillong. R. Buchhawna B.A in-charged President, Lalhmuaka as General Secretary and Hrawva B.A as Treasurer. |
| 1938 | Published its newspaper 'LSA CHANCHINBU' for the first time. |
| 1939 | World War II affected the association. It could not function properly and its newspaper couldn't be published either. |
| 1945 | When World War II ended, it was reformed and the constitutions were amended. |
| 1946 | Lushai Students Association changed its name into Mizo Zirlai Pawl, in short MZP shifted its base from Shillong to Aizawl. The Magazine LSA Newsletter also changed to MZP Chanchinbu. |
| 1959 | After the shock of Mautam (famine) MZP was reformed again. At that time it had offices in Mizo District Council Office and in Govt. Mizo High School. MZP demanded the Special Scholarship for Mizo Students to the Assam Government. For the first time in Mizoram and to promote mizo literature and songs, MZP organised 'Hla Kutpui' (Song Festival) in Aizawl. Formed the committee of Mizo Vernicular. |
| 1966 | Mizo National Front uprising and Mizo Independent Movement influenced most of MZP leaders. Many leaders joined the movement. Therefore, the organisation became weak. |
| 1970s | MZP became one of the strongest and biggest organisation in Mizoram. Around 1000 branches in Mizoram and outside Mizoram state, in Mizoram most high school and village run the organisation. |
| 1973 | MZP revived and re-organised Mizo Traditional festival and 'Chapchar Kut'. This festival is one of the most valued festival till today by the Mizo society which is still celebrated today since that time. |
| 1978 | MZP Conference held in Kolasib decided, the extension for the term of MZP Leaders from one year to two years. |
| 1979 | MZP support the MNF-India peace accord. it submitted the memorandum to the Govt. of India regarding peace in Mizoram. |
| 1981 | Protest the selection of non-mizo in state quota of Technical Course. In that movement most of MZP Leaders were arrested and were imprisoned. Protest and demand to abolish Chakma District Council. |
| 1982 | MZP took an action for peace in Mizoram. The Union Territory Government blame MZP as anti-national and BANNED the organisation. That issued shocked the MZP and it became weakened. But, the organisation was run secretly by a few leaders. |
| 1985 | The new government withdrew the ban of MZP. Northeast Students Coordination Committee (NESCC) organised North East Cultural Festival in Aizawl based MZP. But, MZP could not function properly. During the ban of the organisation, various students associations were formed in Mizoram for different issues and purposes. |
| 1993 | 14 August, seven students association meeting decided to demolish their own organisation and amalgamated to MZP and reformed it again. In September special assembly amended the constitution and elected the new leaders. The Constitution added the Affiliation rules for Mizo Tribe-based students organisation and Federal Council System. The NECC also changed the name to NESO. |
| 1993–1995 | Emphasized the theme of (Mizo hnam inpumkhatna) 'Mizo Unification'. |
| 1994 | MZP against the issue to abolish the ILP. |
| 1995 | Proclaimed the Chakma Foreigner Quite Order. Most of Chakma foreigner deleted from electoral roll. |
| 1996 | Organised the issue of Chakma Foreigners. Long march from Aizawl to Chawngte. |
| 1995–1998 | Proposed and used the theme of (ram leh hnam humhalh) 'Mizo tribe preservation year'. |
| 1997 | For the first time, MZP General Headquarters fall into 'Adviser Rule'. Constitution amendment and extended the term of elected office bearer to two years. The president can't elected more than one term. |
| 2002 | Organised ZOFEST in Churachandpur for the unification among Zo-hnahthlak of Zofa. |
| 2007 | Demanded to the President of India to apologize to the people of Mizo for their bombing Mizoram. |
| 2008 | The Govt. of Mizoram notified MZP rising day is to be observed as 'Zirlaite Ni' (Students' Day). Anniversary of Mizoram bombing day by the Indian Government during MNF Independent movement was celebrate as "Zoram Ni". |
| 2010 | Celebrated its Platinum Jubilee. |
| 2013 | MZP main office building, 'MZP PISAPUI' was inaugurated by Mizoram Chief Minister Lal Thanhawla in Aizawl. |
| 2014 | MZP constructed Zofate Chawlhbuk at Borapansury CADC area. |
| 2018 | MZP constructed the Zofate Chawlhbuk at Zophai, Bairabi. However, it was demolished by the Assam Police, leading to tensions between the state of Mizoram and Assam. |

== Aims and objectives ==
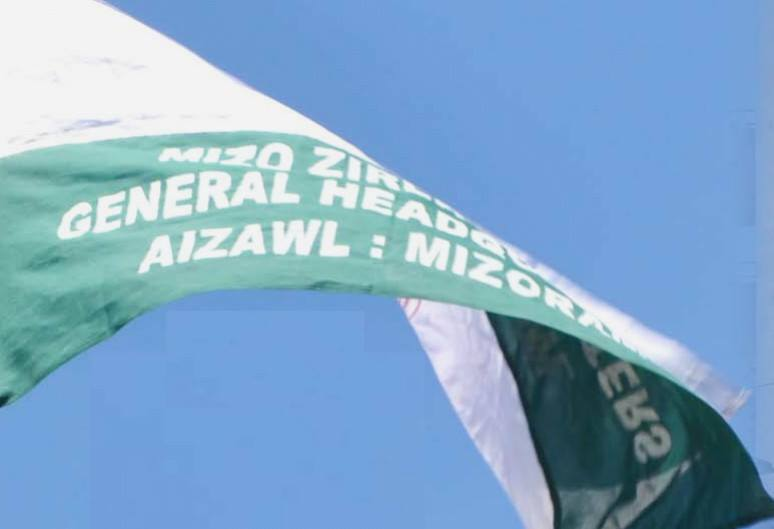
MZP Flag

The motto is Ṭanrual hi chakna (lit. Unity is strength) and the theme (thuvawn) is Mizo students in service of Mizo Nation (Mizo zirlaite kan ram leh hnam tan). Its main aim is 'to prepare all Zohnahthlâk people to be valuable citizens for the Mizo nation and Zoram ' and 'to help the government in the development of Zoram and Mizo nation'. The following are some of the main aims and objectives:

1. to safeguard the rights and unity of all Mizo students
2. to prepare Mizo people to become helpful citizens of Zoram
3. to do its best to unite all Mizo people and create an independent Mizo state out of all the territories historically occupied by Mizo peoples
4. to prevent and attack corruption in Mizoram
5. to conserve traditional Mizo values.

== Functions ==
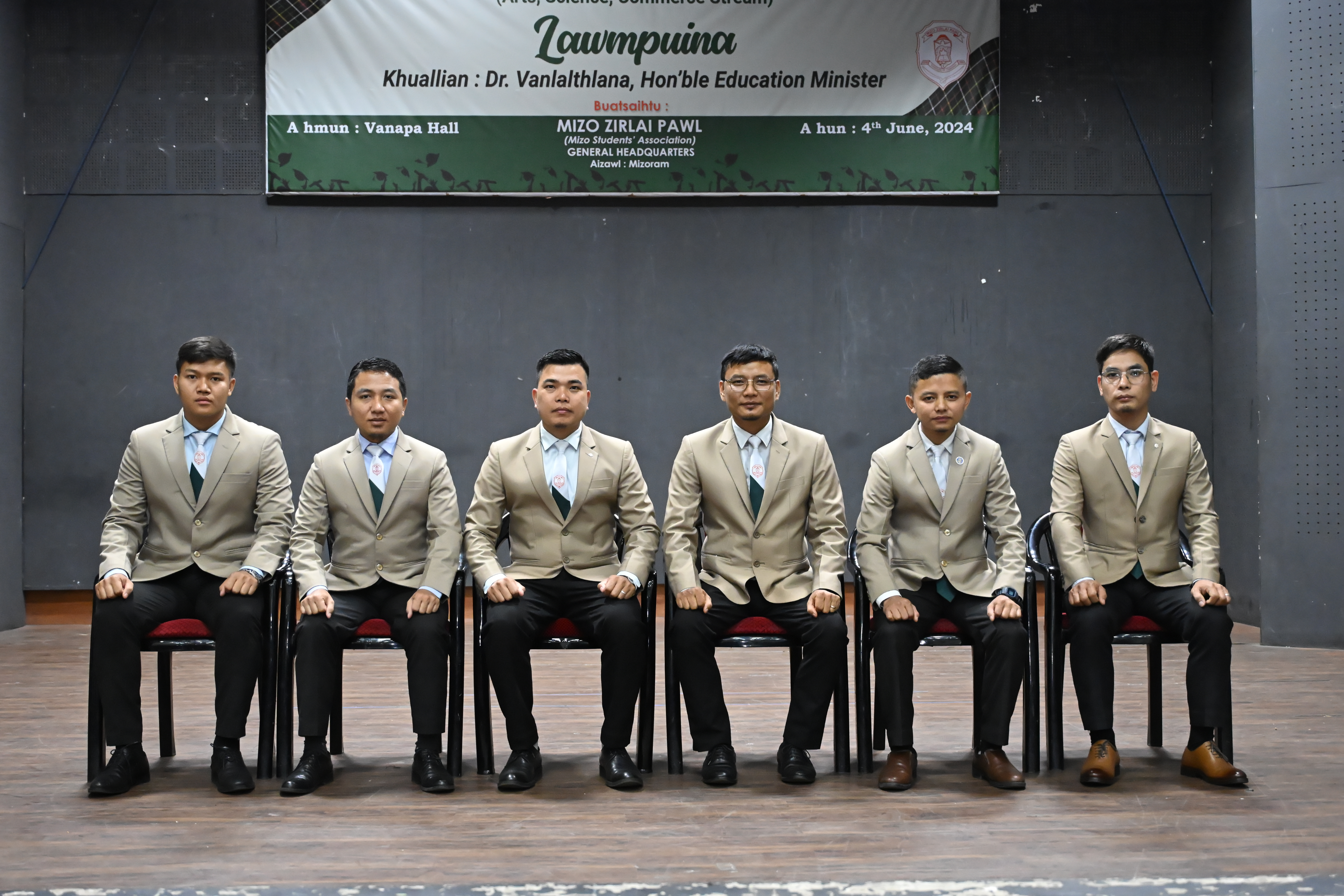
MZP Elected Office Bearers 2023-2025

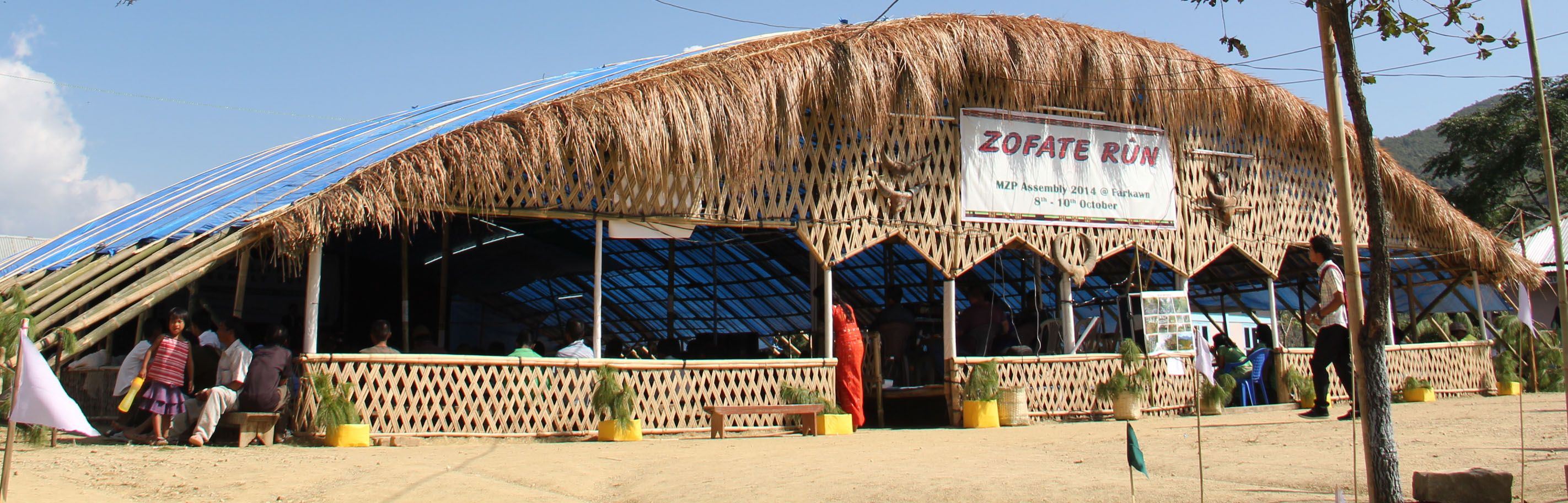
MZP Assembly 2014 pandal Zofate Run at Farkawn, Mizoram

The association is administered by the General Headquarters, which constitutes six elected office bearers elected by an electoral college after every two years, and who in turn appoint not more than fifty executive committee members for a term of 1 year. Ten appointed secretaries are selected among the executive committee members who take charge of various posts to advice and assist the elected office bearer. And then, they run the office and activities actively.

The executive committee appoints the adviser and NESO Council member for one year. Various subcommittees and clubs are also formed in the general headquarters. The following are the elected office bearers for the term 2025–2027-

- President – Dr. C. Lalremruata
- Vice president – Sanghmingthanga
- General secretary – C. Lalhmingsanga
- Assistant Secretary – Lalentlinga
- Treasurer – Rothanliana
- Finance Secretary – Nangsawmthanga

At present Mr. Ricky Lalbiakmawia (finance secretary) represents MZP in the NESO committee. MZP Assembly is the top authority in the association, and Federal Council Sitting is the second highest authority to rule the association.

== Presidents of the organisation ==
| Year | Name |
|---|---|
| 1935–1936 | R.Buchhawna |
| 1936–1937 | R.Buchhawna |
| 1937–1938 | R.Buchhawna |
| 1938–1939 | R.Buchhawna |
| 1939–1940 | R.Buchhawna |
| 1940–1941 | R.Buchhawna |
| 1941–1942 | R.Buchhawna |
| 1942–1943 | Hrawva |
| 1943–1944 | Hrawva |
| 1944–1945 | Hrawva |
| 1945–1946 | Hrawva |
| 1946–1947 | Khawtinkhuma |
| 1947–1948 | R.Buchhawna |
| 1948–1949 | Zairema |
| 1949–1950 | Zairema |
| 1950–1951 | Sangliana |
| 1951–1952 | Lalsiama |
| 1952–1953 | Lalsiama |
| 1953–1954 | Sangliana |
| 1954–1955 | K.C.Lalvunga |
| 1955–1956 | K.C.Lalvunga |
| 1956–1957 | J. Malsawma |
| 1957–1958 | Sangliana |
| 1958–1959 | Sangliana |
| 1959–1960 | H.K.Bawichhuaka |
| 1960–1961 | H.Raltawna |
| 1961–1962 | H.K.Bawichhuaka |
| 1962–1963 | Romawia |
| 1963–1964 | Romawia |
| 1964–1965 | Rozinga |
| 1965–1966 | Rozinga |
| 1966–1967 | Rozinga |
| 1967–1968 | Rozinga |
| 1968–1969 | Rozinga |
| 1969–1970 | L.Pachunga |
| 1970–1971 | J.Lalduhawma |
| 1971–1972 | R.L.Thanzawna |
| 1972–1973 | Zoliana Royte |
| 1973–1974 | Lalnuntluanga |
| 1974–1975 | |
| 1975–1976 | |
| 1976–1977 | J.V. Hluna |
| 1977–1978 | J.V. Hluna |
| 1978–1980 | T.C.Kapmawia |
| 1980–1982 | Rochunga Ralte |
| 1982–1984 | Zokailiana Khiangte |
| 1984–1986 | |
| 1986 | |
| 1987–1989 | B.C.Lalbiakngura |
| 1989–1993 | F.Lalchhawnkima |
| 1993 (Ad hoc 1 month) | Lalmuanpuia Punte |
| 1993–1994 | Lalmuanpuia Punte |
| 1994–1995 | Lalmuanpuia Punte |
| 1995–1996 | K Vanlalvena |
| 1996–1997 | Lalmuanpuia Punte |
| 1997–1999 | Lalruatkima |
| 1999–2001 | R.Vanlalvena |
| 2001–2003 | Lalchhandama Ralte |
| 2003–2005 | C.Lalrokhuma |
| 2005–2007 | PC.Laltlansanga |
| 2007–2009 | C.Lalhmachhuana |
| 2009–2011 | V.L.Krosshnehzova |
| 2011–2013 | James Thanghmingmawia |
| 2013–2015 | Lalhmachhuana |
| 2015–2017 | Lalsangzuala Ngente |
| 2017–2019 | L. Ramdinliana Renthlei |
| 2019–2021 | B.Vanlaltana (L) |
| 2021–2023 | Lalnunmawia Pautu |
| 2023–2025 | H. Lalthianghlima |
| 2025-2027 | Dr. C. Lalremruata |

== Event ==
=== Assembly ===
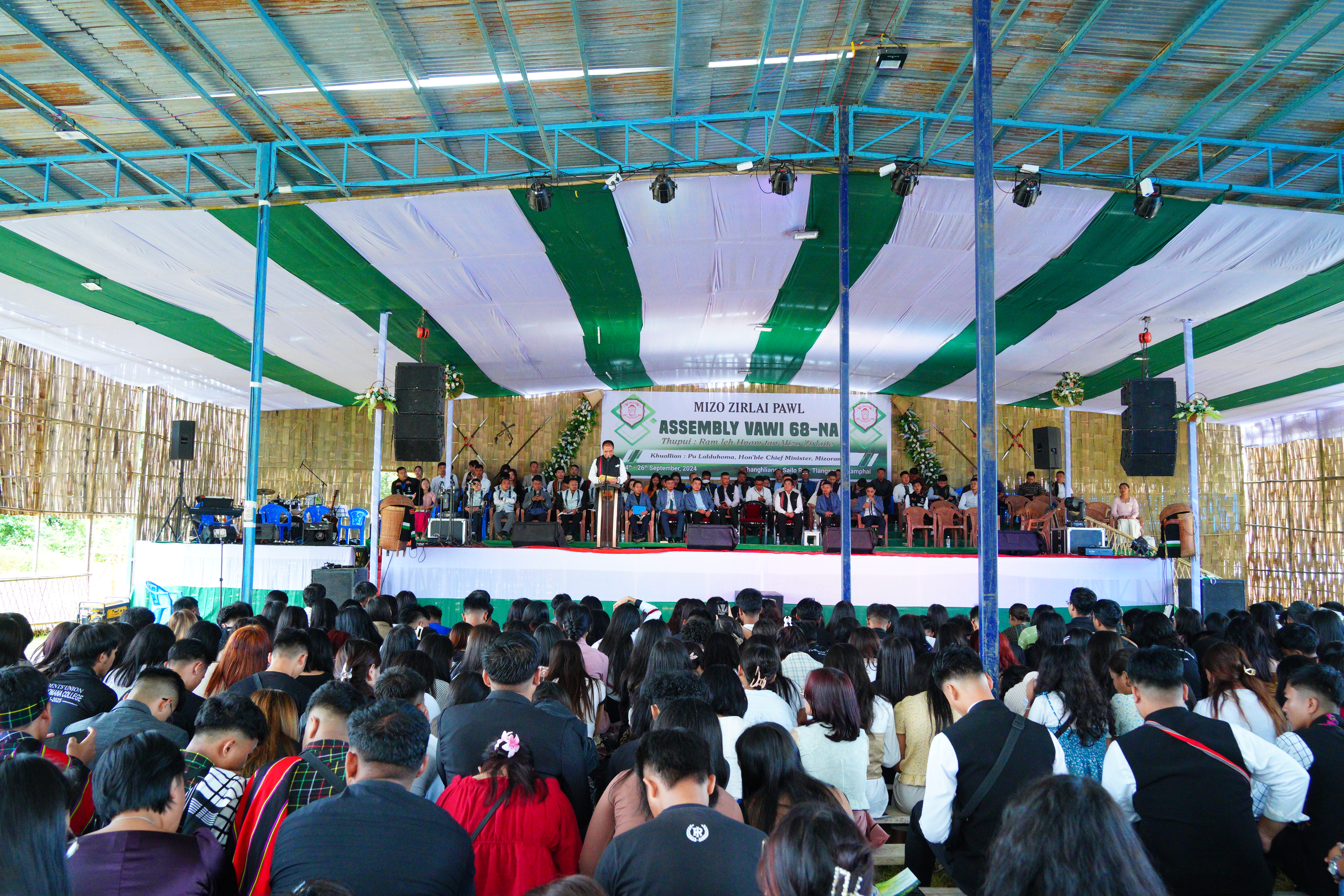
MZP Assembly 2024, Tlangsam

The Mizo Zirlai Pawl (MZP) Assembly is the highest decision-making body of the organization. Convening annually, it deliberates on the future direction and activities of the MZP. During this gathering, the Assembly approved the organization's activity plan, which outlines key initiatives and strategies for the upcoming period. This plan is designed to guide MZP's efforts in student welfare, cultural preservation, and advocacy for the Mizo community.

=== Federal Council Sitting ===
The Mizo Zirlai Pawl (MZP) Federal Council Sitting serves as the second-highest decision-making body within the organization. It convenes to set and filter agendas for the MZP Assembly and to oversee the implementation of the Assembly's decisions and plans. The Federal Council has the authority to formulate and plan the organization's future activities. Additionally, it possesses the power to dissolve both the General Headquarters and Sub-Headquarters of MZP. The General Headquarters has the prerogative to summon the Federal Council as needed.

=== Zofest ===
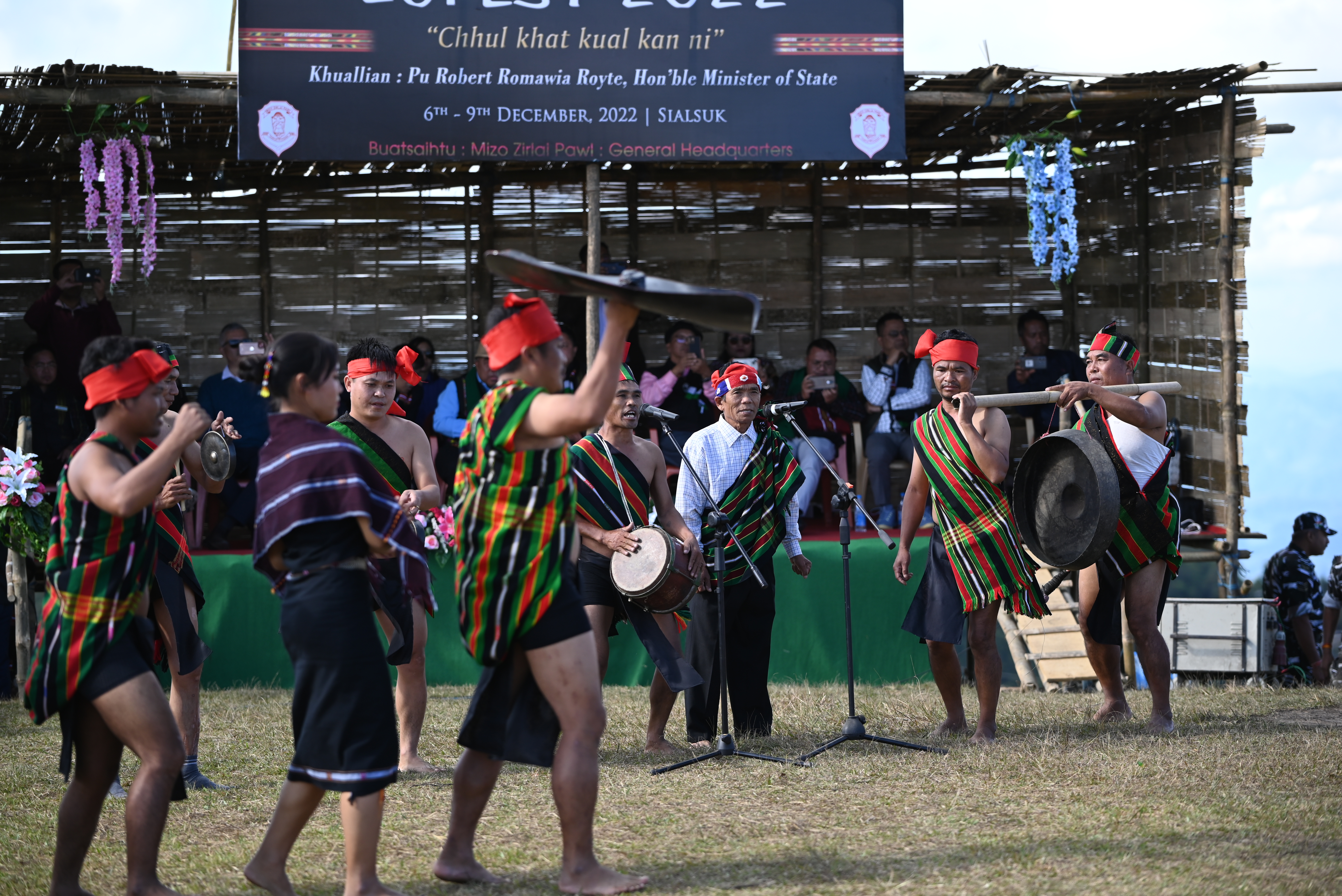
Zofest 2022 Sialsuk

The Mizo Zirlai Pawl (MZP) has organized Zofest to unite the Zofate—Mizo ethnic communities—residing in various parts of the world, particularly in India, Myanmar, and Bangladesh. These regions share common borders, cultures, histories, traditions, languages, beliefs, and faiths.

The inaugural Zofest was held in 2002 at YPA Hall in Lamka, Manipur. Since then, the event has been hosted in various locations, including Aizawl, Mizoram (2004, 2006, 2009); Darchawi, Tripura (2012); Manipur (2012); Haflong, Assam (2014); Zokhawthar, Mizoram (2016); Reiek, Mizoram (2018); Sialsuk, Mizoram (2022); and W. Phaileng, Mizoram (2024).

In 2024, Zofest was held from December 3 to 6 in W. Phaileng, Mizoram. The theme for this year's event was "Hrui Khat Vuanin" (Marching Together as One), and the gathering venue was named "Lalbuanga Run" in honor of the Chief of W. Phaileng. The event attracted participants from Zofa ethnic groups across Mizoram, Myanmar, Bangladesh, Manipur, Tripura, Assam, the United States, and beyond, making it a truly international celebration of culture.

Objectives of Zofest: Promote Unity Among Zofa Communities: Encourage a sense of unity among the various Zofa tribes across different regions, emphasizing their shared heritage and common aspirations.

Cultural Exchange and Enrichment: Provide a platform for participants to showcase their unique cultures, traditions, and practices, fostering mutual learning and enriching the broader Zofa community.

Strengthen Brotherhood and Sisterhood: Highlight the familial bonds that unite all Zofa people, reinforcing the understanding that, despite political boundaries, they are connected by blood and a common ancestry.

Celebrate Linguistic Similarities: Highlight the shared linguistic heritage of the Zofa community, noting that over 60% of Zofa languages exhibit similarities, despite the presence of approximately 30 distinct languages within the group.

=== Remna Ni ===
Remna Ni, or "Peace Day," is observed annually on June 30 in Mizoram to commemorate the signing of the Mizo Peace Accord in 1986. This historic agreement between the Government of India and the Mizo National Front (MNF) ended two decades of insurgency and unrest in the region, ushering in an era of peace and stability.

Since 2018, the Mizo Zirlai Pawl (MZP), the apex student body, has been at the forefront of organizing Remna Ni celebrations, providing a platform for all political parties and organizations to unite in honoring the spirit of peace and reconciliation. These observances serve as a reminder of the sacrifices made and the importance of maintaining harmony among the diverse communities in Mizoram.

On this day, the MZP also recognizes and appreciates individuals and organizations that have made significant contributions to the peace process. The following individuals have been honored for their exemplary roles:

2018: Pu Lal Thanhawla, Pu Laldenga, Pu Lalkhama (IAS Retd.)

2019: Rev. Dr. H.S. Luaia, Rev. Dr. Zairema, Rev. Dr. Lalngurauva Ralte, Pu Lalduhoma

2022: Rev. Dr. Lalsawma

2023: Mizoram Kohhran Hruaitute Committee

2024: Pu J.H. Rothuama, Pu P. Lalupa, Pu Lalthanzauva, Pu Ngurchhina

2026 : Rev. Dr. CL Hminga

These awards acknowledge their unwavering commitment and significant contributions to fostering peace and unity in Mizoram.

=== Zoram Ni ===
On March 1, 1966, the Mizo National Front (MNF) declared Mizoram's independence. In response, the Indian Air Force launched an airstrike on Aizawl on March 5, 1966, using jet fighters to bomb the city. This resulted in significant civilian casualties and widespread destruction. The affected areas included Republic Veng, Hmeichhe Veng, Dawrpui Veng, Chhinga Veng and different parts of Mizoram. The bombing remains the only instance of India using its air force against its own citizens.

The Indian government's justification for the bombing was that it was targeting MNF installations. However, many civilians were killed, and the distinction between combatants and non-combatants was not clear from the air. This led to widespread condemnation and demands for accountability.

In 2008, the Mizo Zirlai Pawl (MZP), the apex student body in Mizoram, began observing March 5 as "Zoram Ni" (Zoram Day) to remember the tragic events of that day. The day is marked with various activities, including seminars, discussions, and cultural programs, to instill a sense of nationalism and to honor the sacrifices made by the people of Mizoram.

On August 10, 2023, Prime Minister Narendra Modi addressed the Indian Parliament, acknowledging the events of March 5, 1966, and the impact on the Mizo people. He emphasized the importance of understanding and reconciliation.

== Publication ==
Mizo Zirlai Pawl publishes a monthly magazine MZP CHANCHINBU in Mizo language since 1938. It has a circulation of 1,000 copies. It registered under Registrar of Newspapers for India

== See also ==
- Northeast Students' Organization
- Wesean Student Federation
- Akhil Bharatiya Vidyarthi Parishad
