= Naznin Faruque =

Indian politician and social worker

Member of Parliament, Rajya Sabha
- In office 3 April 2010 – 2 April 2016
- Preceded by: Anwara Taimur
- Succeeded by: Ranee Narah
- Constituency: Assam

Chairperson, Assam State Weaving Manufacturing Cooperative Limited
- In office 1994 – 1996
- Chief Ministers: Hiteswar Saikia; Bhumidhar Barman

Personal details
- Born: 1 August 1954
- Died: 17 September 2020 (aged 66)
- Party: Indian National Congress
- Spouse: Abdur Rahman Faruque
- Education: North Eastern Hill University
- Profession: Social worker, Politician

Naznin Faruque (1 August 1954–17 September 2020) was an Indian social worker, politician and former Member of Parliament, Rajya Sabha from Assam, India belonging to the Indian National Congress party.

== Early life and education ==
Faruque was born on 1 August 1954, in Nagaon in the Indian state of Assam. She graduated with Bachelor's of Arts from Lady Kene College under the North Eastern Hill University, Shillong, Meghalaya. She married Abdur Rahman Faruque on 10 January 1973.

== Career ==
Faruque was Chairperson of the Assam State Weaving Manufacturing Cooperative Limited from 1994 to 1996. She was elected secretary of All India Mahila Congress Committee in 2009. In 2010 Rajya Sabha elections, Faruque was elected to the Rajya Sabha from Assam as the first-ranked choice over fellow Congress leader, Silvius Condpan, with 43 to 42 votes. She represented Assam in the Rajya Sabha until 2016. She served as a member of the Parliamentary Committee on Chemicals and Fertilizers, Consultative Committee for the Ministry of Minority Affairs, Committee on Empowerment of Women, Committee on Member of Parliament Local Area Development Scheme (MPLADS) and Court of the Assam Assembly.

== Death ==
Faruque died on 17 September 2020 at the age of 66. Her demise was condoled by Rajya Sabha Chairman Venkaiah Naidu, Leader of the Opposition Ghulam Nabi Azad and other members of the Rajya Sabha during its sitting on 19 September 2020.

== Recognition ==
- 2009: "Bharat Jyoti Award".
