= Chuauṭhuama =

Mizo pastor, theologian and author (1947–2024)

The Reverend Chuauṭhuama
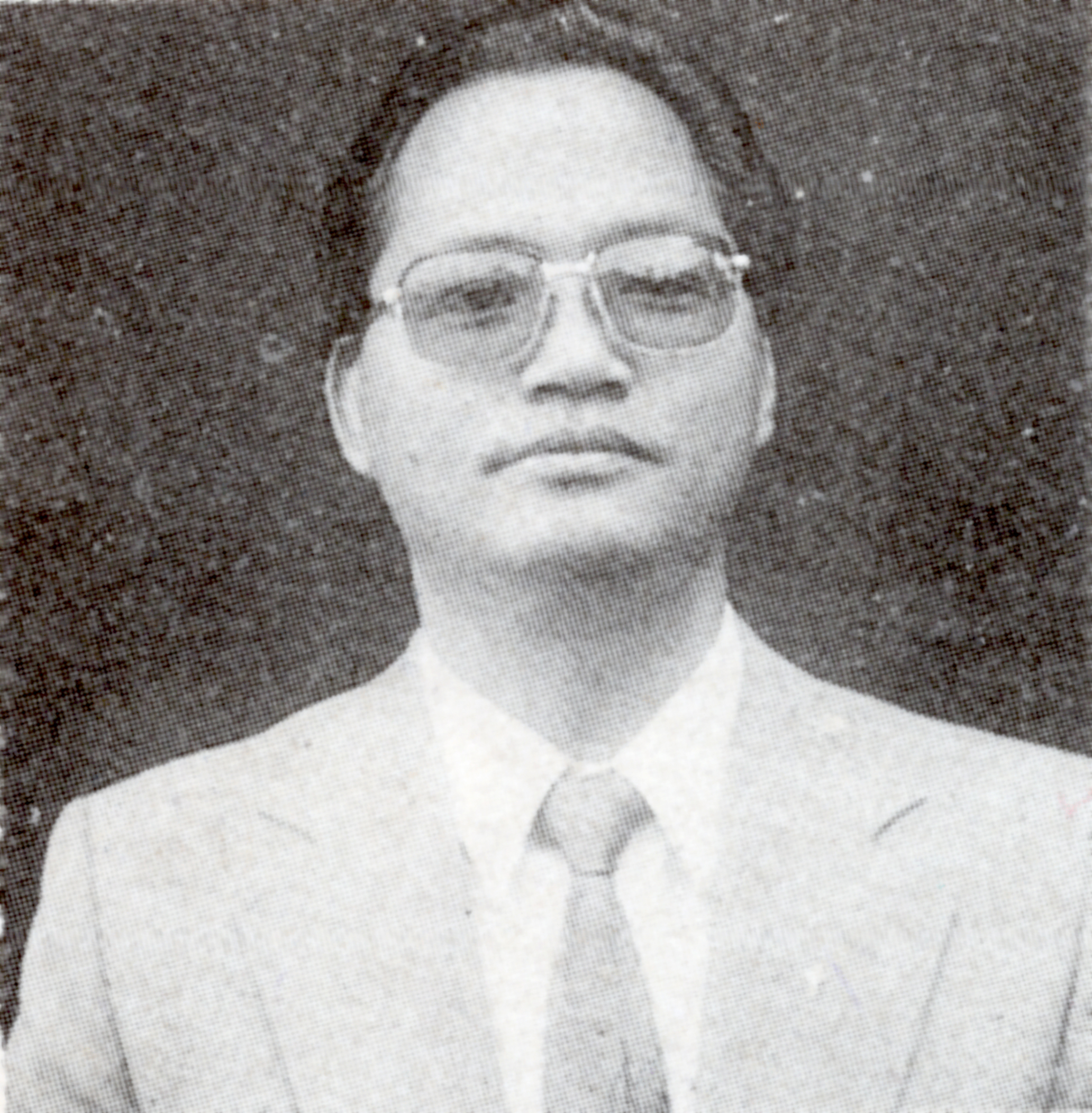
- Portrait (undated)
- Born: 1 April 1947; Bukpui, Lushai Hills District, British India
- Died: 4 January 2024 (aged 76); Aizawl, Mizoram, India
- Education: St John's College, Cambridge; United Theological College, Bangalore
- Occupations: Christian minister; Author; Lecturer
- Spouse: Lalchhumi
- Children: Elsa Lalramzauvi Pachuau
- Awards: Hon. D.Div.

Ecclesiastical career
- Religion: Christian
- Church: Mizoram Presbyterian Church

Chuauṭhuama (Mizo: [t͡suʌu˩ .t͡ʂʰuʌm˥ .ʌ˧]; 1 April 1947 – 4 January 2024) was a Presbyterian minister, biblical scholar and writer who had an extensive influence in the church and society in Mizoram. He was the first Mizo to earn a degree from Cambridge University.

He specialized in the Old Testament and Hebrew language and was the Chief Translator of the Mizo (Bible) Revised Version project under Bible Society of India starting from the year 2017 till the day he died.

== Early life ==
Chuauṭhuama was born in the village of Bukpui, Lushai Hills District to Tawna and Buaii. He was the youngest of six. His father was a church elder and worked as a teacher in a primary school run by the church. He started schooling at the age of 7, and was noted for excelling in his studies. In 1963, he went to Aizawl for higher studies, however, his studies was cut short in 1966 by the Mizo National Front uprising. He went back home and spent the remaining year helping his parents in their field.

=== False imprisonment by the Indian Army ===
In 1967, Chuauṭhuama and his friends decided to go to Jowai, Meghalaya for studies as all schools were closed in the district. On their journey, they were arrested by security forces. Chuauthuama was falsely implicated to be a high ranking rebel, viz, a Commissioner in the Mizo National Army. He was subsequently jailed for three years in Tezpur Central Jail.

== Career ==
In January, 1970 he was released from jail. He joined Synod High School and completed his matriculation exam in 1972. From 1973-1977, he worked as a Lower Division Clerk (LDC) in the Mizoram Home Guard. While working he also did his Bachelor's, enrolling in Pachhunga Memorial College (Evening shift). He graduated in 1976 with Distinction, he was ranked 2nd in NEHU. From 1978, he worked as a teacher in Hrangchhuana High School rising to the rank of Headmaster.

In 1983, he resigned from his post as Headmaster to begin his theological studies. He enrolled for a Bachelor of divinity in United Theological College, Bangalore. In 1987, he graduated in first class. He won 13 academic first prize and 2 academic second prize. He was ranked first in BD in the University of Serampore and won the Senator's Prize for Highest Proficiency.

In childhood, I wanted to be an engineer (BE). I was arrested in 1967 during the troubled years (Mizo National Front uprising). I was imprisoned for three years at Tezpur Jail. By 1968, what I wanted to be had completely changed, "If I were to survive and be free, whenever the time is right, I will study the word of God (BD)." Translated from Mizo

— Chuauṭhuama, "Chan Loh Khanah", Vanglaini (11 Dec, 2021)

From 1988-1990, he studied and completed his M.Phil (Old Testament & Hebrew Language) at Cambridge University. He subsequently finished a course on "The Bible & Its Setting" at St. George's College, Jerusalem. In 1998, he also attended a course on "Reading the Bible from the Jewish Perspective" in the Netherlands.

== Ministry ==
Rev. Chuauthuama, Synod Inkhawmpui (c. 2001)

In 1990, he returned to Mizoram and was appointed as a probationary pastor. He was appointed to the Lunglei pastorate. In 1993, he was elevated into a full pastor. He worked at Aizawl Theological College as a lecturer from 1994 till 2007 when he reached retirement age. From 2008, he served as the principal of Centenary School, Dawrpui. He returned to Aizawl Theological College from 2011-2015 to teach when the college started teaching a M.Th (Old Testament) degree.

During his 34 years of ministry, he undertook the following roles:

- Pro Pastor, Lunglei Bial (1991-1993)
- Lecturer Aizawl Theological College (1994- 2001)
- Registrar ATC (2002-2007)
- Synod Secretary Jr. (2000)
- Synod Secretary Sr. (2001)
- Synod Literature & Publication Board (1998- 2000)
- Mizo Sunday School Union (2001-2003)
- Presbyterian Publication Board (2004-2006)
- Research & Evaluation Wing (2004- 2006, 2019-2021)
- Synod Worship Committee (2007-2009, 2010-2012, 2013-2015)
- PCI General Assembly Executive Committee (2001-2003, 2004-2006, 2006-2009)
- Christian Home Committee (2001-2002)
- Synod Social Front (2010-2012)
- Synod Pastoral Committee (2013-2015, 2016-2018)
- Synod Pension & Provident Fund Board (2013-2018)
- MTC Governing Committee (2019-2021)
- Synod Executive Committee (2019- till death)

For his exemplary service to the church and society and his literary contributions he was conferred Doctor of Divinity (Honoris causa) by Serampore College (University) on December 4, 2023.

== Death ==
Chuauṭhuama was very healthy throughout his life. He reportedly took only five days of casual leave throughout his career as a lecturer in Aizawl Theological College. After his retirement, he had some minor problems with his eyes. In addition to this he also had mild hypertension. On 4 January, 2024, he went to the hospital for a checkup regarding his hypertension. The doctors found that he had had a heart attack, he was consequently put into an ICCU at Ebenezer Hospital. He was put under a ventilator and he died at 10:20 pm.

== Works ==
He wrote 58 books and co-authored/edited 17 books/journals. He was a columnist for Vanglaini from 2013 till his death.

Books Authored
Year	Book
1993/2002	Mizo leh Israel
1994	Ram Thianghlim Kal Theuh Theuh
1995	Mi Biru Entawn Tlakte - I
1995	Mi Biru Entawn Tlakte - II
1995	Pathian Thu Zir Hlawkna
1995	Zu Hi Thil A Ni
1996	Bethlehem Lam I Thlir Ang
1996	Bible-a Chhungkaw Entawn Tlakte
1966	Joba Hrilhfiahna (Gospel Centenary Commentary Series)
1996	Anni Leh Kei
1996	Chawhchawrawi
1998	Bible Code Chhuina
1998/2002	Bible Zir Dan (SMTC Text Book)
1999/2001	Isu Tuallenna Ram
2002	Isua Thlan Ka Teh Ta
2001/2002	2002 Nilai leh Beihrual Thupui
2002/2005	Bible Hriat Zauna
2002	Roreltute leh Ruthi Hrilhfiahna (MSU Puitling Sunday School Zirlai 2002)
2002/2011	Kalvari Tlang I Thlir Ang
2003	Ka Kal Zel Dawn
2003/2009	Bethlehem Tlang I Thlir Ang
2003	Beginner Zirlai Bu Khatna
2004	Witness of Israel to Liberation (BD, BCS Text Book)
2004	Introducing the Psalter
2004	Kristian Nun
2004	Beginner Zirlai Bu Hnihna
2005	Israel-te Chanchin Tlangpui (SMTC Text Book)
2005	Thalaite Mamawh - Isua Krista
2005	Isua Pantute (2005)
2005	Tunlai Juda-te Nunphung
2005	Mizo Bible Encyclopedia
2005/2007/2009	Bible-a Hming Awmzia
2006	Ka Zirna Ram
2006	Chinbawr
2006	Bible Study Kalpui Dan leh Zawlnei Hagaia
2007	Burma Ram Zin Thu
2007/2009	Kraws Chhuanawm
2008	Bible Thu Mal Hrilhfiahna
2009	Kal Hmaste Hlutna
2009	Kum Sawmhnih Sulhnu
2010	Israel-te Chanchin (PBS Text Book)
2010/2011/2013	Zotawng Bible Dictionary
2010	Kum Ruk Sulhnu
2010	Dr. Luka'n a tisual thei angem?
2011	Bible Knowledge
2012	Rev. Zairema Biblical Commentary, Sam 42-73
2013	Rev. Zairema Biblical Commentary, Sam 73-100
2013	Norma Lalpekhlui Nghilh Loh Nan (Booklet)
2013	Paula Lung In Tan Lehkhathawn
2014	Roreltu leh Ruthu (Centenary Commentary)
2014	Bible, Zu leh Mizote
2014	Bethlehema Nau Lo Piang Chu
2015	Aw Tlang Mawi Kalvari
2015	Ram Thianghlim Kal Puitu
2013/2014/2015	Heti Hian Ka Ngaihtuah
2015	A taka Kristiana
2015	Revd Chuauthuama Huang

== See also ==
- Mizoram Presbyterian Church
- Serampore College
- Zairema
