= Khasi Jaintia Federated State National Conference =

The Khasi Jaintia Federated State National Conference (abbreviated KJFSNC) was an organization is the Khasi-Jaintia hills, India. As of 1946 KJFSNC petitioned the British authorities to create a Khasi Jaintia Federated States within Assam, merging the existing Khasi states with areas under British direct rule. The organization proposed of system of three branches of government; National Council, Executive Council and Federal Court.

KJFSNC fielded a single candidate in the 1952 Assam Legislative Assembly election, A. Alley in the Nongpoh constituency. Alley won the seat, with 9,441 votes (57.24%).
