= Zairema =

Indian minister (1917–2008)

The Reverend Zairema
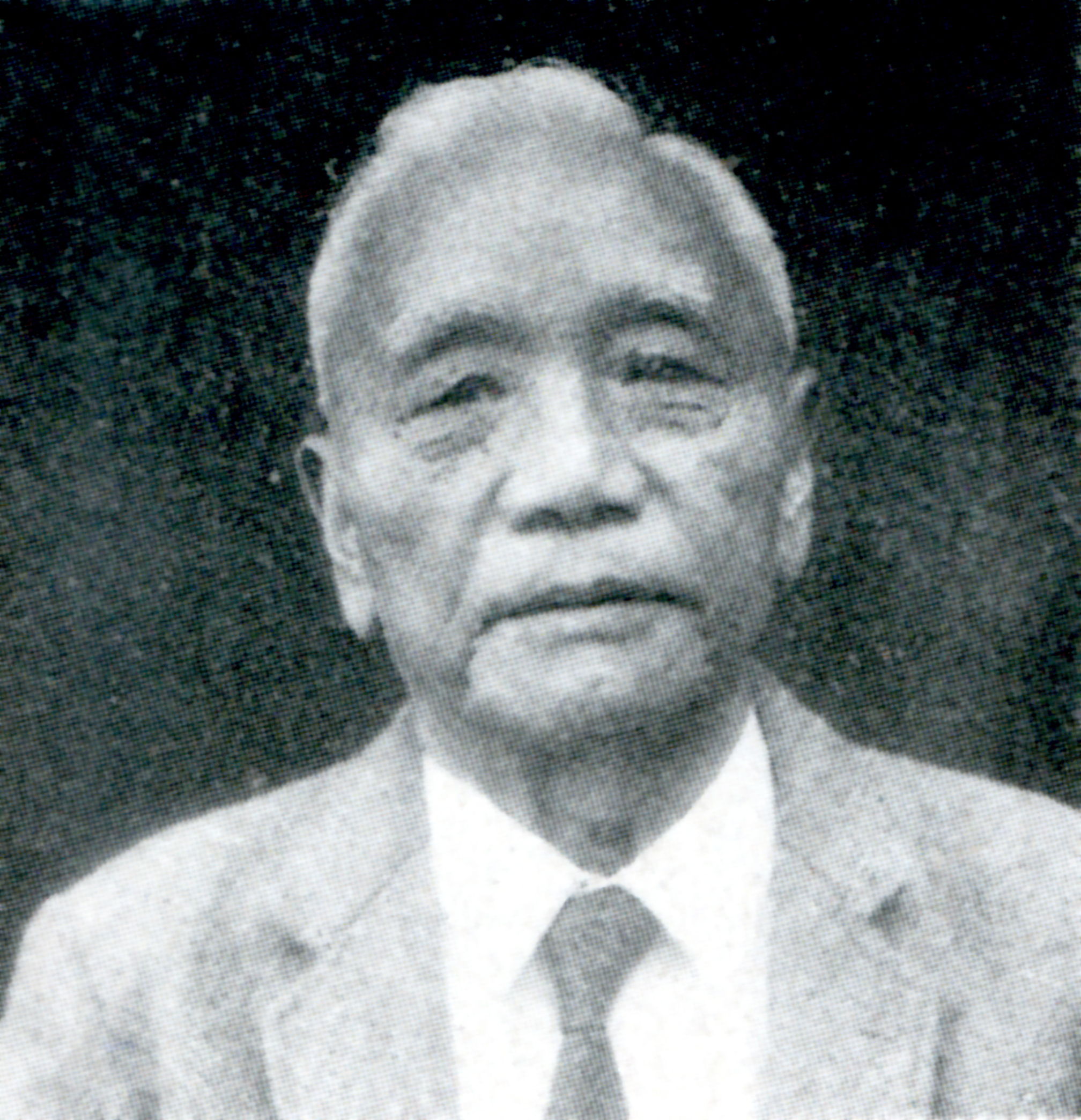
- Born: 4 March 1917; Hmunhmelṭha, Lushai Hills District, British India
- Died: 17 December 2008 (aged 91); Aizawl, India
- Citizenship: India
- Education: BSc (1940), BD (1945); Gauhati University; Serampore College
- Known for: Mizo literature Mizo Bible
- Spouse: Thangdailovi
- Parent: Doliana Khawlhring
- Awards: Hon. D.Litt. Hon. D.Div. MAL Book of the Year 2003

Zairema (/zaɪˈrɛmə/; 4 May 1917 – 17 December 2008) was a Presbyterian minister, and a pioneer in theology and literature among the Mizo people of northeast India. He was the first Mizo to obtain the degrees of BSc and BD. He died of cardiac problem on the morning of 17 December 2008 at his residence in Aizawl at the age of 91. He is best remembered as the "father of Mizoram Synod".

== Early life and education ==
Zairema was born in Hmunhmelṭha, a small village in the eastern Mizoram. He was the eldest of the three sons of Doliana Khawlhring and Aibuani. His father Doliana was among the first literate Mizos and was an elementary school teacher at Champhai (Chawnchhim). Zairema was baptised by the first Mizo Pastor Vanchhunga on 2 September 1917. His father died from falling off of a tree in 1922 so that they were raised solely by his widowed mother. He studied at Champhai Primary School from 1922 to 1924. He completed his elementary education from Government Boys' ME School (then Sikulpui) at Aizawl in 1931 in first class. He matriculated in first class from Government High School at Shillong, Meghalaya, in 1936. He continued at Cotton College, Guwahati for Intermediate of Science (ISc), which he finished with first class, and then BSc with major in chemistry in 1940. He was immediately appointed as headmaster at the Harasinga High School. But after two years in 1943, to fulfil his real ambition, he joined Serampore College from where he completed Bachelor of Divinity in 1945 in first class. He made a record of the institute as the first in the merit and the first to have secured first class under the entire Senate of Serampore College.

== Career and professional achievements ==
Immediately on completion of his theology course, Zairema was recruited by the Mizoram Synod (the then North Lushai Assembly, now under the Presbyterian Church of India) and he was officially ordained as a full minister of Presbyterian Church on 23 September 1945. Instead of the usual pastoral ministry, the first major and immediate task assigned to him was to prepare the complete Mizo version of the Holy Bible, of which some New Testament and very few Old Testament were already (mostly in parts) translated by British missionaries. At the behest of the community, the church arranged part-time duty as a teacher at the newly established Mizo High School, Zarkawt, Aizawl, from 1945; and was designated as Assistant Headmaster in 1948. With collaboration from the Baptist Church, he completed the full Bible in Mizo in 1959. In 1946, he was appointed as the Assembly Secretary of the Mizoram Synod, and became the Assembly Moderator for the year 1953. Between 1954 and 1859 he held the office of Education Secretary of the new Mizoram Synod. Between 1959 and 1967 he managed the mission field at Cachar, Assam while serving as the Assembly Officer of PCI. He was elected to PCI Secretary in 1953 and Moderator in 1959. In 1968 he was elected as the first General Secretary of the Mizoram Synod, the office of which he took up in August. When the secretarial office was extended he became the Senior Executive Secretary from 1974 and remained till 1981. He was once again Moderator Elect in 1975. From 1963 to 1996 he served as the active leader as the Chief Translator in the revision of the Mizo Bible under the initiative of the Bible Society of India. Unfortunately, even though the project was completed, the revised Bible has never been officially endorsed due to publication errors. He retired from Synod office in 1982.

== Other academic and social works ==
When Mizoram was clouded by the terrors and atrocities of the political uprising in 1966, Rev. Zairema was the main leader of the coordinated action of all churches in Mizoram for seeking peaceful settlement among the rebels, the Mizo National Front. He was even imprisoned for 11 days in 1967 by the Assam Police on a deliberate accusation of inciting and accessing the rebels, and was later simply acquitted. He was an official consultant of Mizoram Government such as in the planning board, land tenure system, council of science, civil service examination, school education, language board, customary law, etc. He was a regular examiner of Calcutta University and Gauhati University undergraduate examinations from 1946 to 1970. He was the only subject expert in Mizo for the recruitment of teaching faculty of Mizoram University in 2005. Upon the permission of the church, he served as the Vice-President of Mizo Union, the first political party in Mizoram, from 1946 to 1947. In 1957 he was approved by the Mizoram Synod for candidacy in the Member of Parliament election to Lok Sabha as an independent candidate. But nomination was not filed. In 1959 he was a fully nominated MP candidate, but lost the election. He was one of the most active leaders in the Young Mizo Association, the largest organisation in Mizoram. He hold the office as Vice-President in 1946 and 1949, and general secretary in 1947.

In 1982, following his professional retirement he, along with other enthusiasts, established nongovernmental organisations called Vigilance Council and Mizoram Guardians to fight against political corruption.

== Personal life and death ==
Zairema was a conservative theologian and a rigorous pacifist. His attempt to restore peace from the Mizoram insurgency of 1966 was extraordinary, personally struggling his ways between the rebel leaders in the deep jungle and central government officials of India (Prime Minister, Home Minister and Home Secretary). A notable political figure, A. Thanglura, even dubbed him as one of the three blind mice of the insurgency because of his often futile but unfeigned actions. His commitment to political and social justice was best exemplified by his Public Interest Litigation petition to the Supreme Court of India against corruption. He initiated the case in 1996 that lasted even after his death. This particularly affected the Chief Minister Lalthanhawla on charges of bribery for which the minister was summoned to police and court numerous times.

He married Thangdailovi on 4 March 1943, and they lived at Zarkawt, McDonald Hill, Aizawl. His wife died on 6 March 2003. He spent his last days with a heart problem. On 17 December 2008, 0600 hr (local time) he was pronounced dead due to cardiac failure, at the age of 91, in his residence at Zarkawt. He was survived by a son (2 died in their youths), 4 daughters, and 17 grandchildren.

== Recognitions and awards ==
On 2 February 1988, the Serampore University conferred him the degree of Doctor of Divinity (honoris causa) for his contribution in theology, specifically on the preparation of the Mizo Bible. On 2 July 1991 the North Eastern Hill University decorated him with a Doctor of Literature (honoris causa) for his contributions to Mizo literature.

The Mizo Academy of Letters awarded his theological memoire Kan Bible Hi as the Book of the Year 2003. His subsequent book Pipute Biak Hi was a runner-up of the Book of the Year 2009.

He was posthumously awarded Academy Award 2007–2010 of the Mizo Academy of Letters, the most prestigious award in Mizoram, on 26 November 2010 for his significant contributions in Mizo literature. The award carried a citation, a medal and cash prize of INR 10,000.

In 2011, a registered society, Zairema Memorial Society, was established in his honour with an objective of working for social justice and development.

== Gallery ==
Rev. Dr. Zairema hands typewriter to Rev. Vanlalvena, BSI Saitual Branch

Rev. Dr. Zairema (far right second), member of Synod Literature Committee (1980-1982)

== Publications ==
Other than the complete Mizo Bible, now in use, his most notable works are

1. Kan lalpa leh chhandamtu Isua Krista chanchin tha Mathaia ziak 1966
2. Bilât Lei Hnathawh Dân 1967
3. Chanchin Ṭha Marka (commentary to Gospel of Mark) 1971
4. Chanchin Ṭha Johana (commentary to Gospel of John) 1975
5. Beiseina Kawng: chanchin ṭha Marka ziak 1977
6. Muanna Kawng: chanchin ṭha Luka ziak 1977
7. Uar Bik Nei Pâwlte 1977
8. God's Miracles in Mizoram: a glimpse of Christian work among head-hunters 1978
9. Hmangaihna Aw (A Mizo revised version of the New Testament) 1986
10. Khati Khan Kan Hril ṭhin a 1986
11. Apokrifa (Mizo translation) 1989
12. Pathian Lehkhabu thianghlim: Thuthlung Hlui leh Thuthlung Thar 1996
13. Kan Bible Hi 2003
14. Random notes 2009
15. Pipute Biak Hi 2009
16. I Ni Min Pekte Hi (autobiography) 2009
17. Isua Rilru 2009

He had written more than 80 literary essays in Mizo and about 40 in English. Some of his best articles include The drum, Origin of Tlâwmngaihna, What made the Mizos tick, Introducing Bombay fantasies (English); Thukhuh, Zûn, Tawrhna, Mai mai fakna, Mal, Sakhua leh Culture, A no ber mai, Dul pen, Mizo ṭawng dik hman zir, Ziaka Mizo ṭawng, Mizo ṭawng kan hman dân ṭhenkhat, A eng zâwk nge upa? Inthawina, Hmeichhia nge minu and Mizoten hrisel an tum dân (Mizo).

== See also ==
- Chuauthuama
- Mizoram Presbyterian Church
