= A. Thanglura =

Indian politician (1926–1994)

Aloysius Thanglura
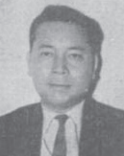

Cabinet Minister Government of Assam
- In office 11 November 1970 – 31 January 1972
- Department: Soil Conservation; Stamps and Registration
- Chief Minister: Mahendra Mohan Choudhry

Member of Parliament, Rajya Sabha
- In office 20 June 1962 – 2 March 1964
- In office 3 March 1964 – 2 February 1967
- Constituency: Assam

Member of the Assam Legislative Assembly
- In office 1967–1972
- Succeeded by: Ch. Chhunga
- Constituency: Aijal West
- In office 1957–1962
- Succeeded by: Constituency abolished
- Constituency: Aijal West

Personal details
- Born: 3 December 1926 Sairang, Lushai Hills District, British India (now Mizoram, India)
- Died: 9 September 1994 (aged 67) Shillong, Meghalaya, India
- Party: Indian National Congress; Mizo Union
- Spouse: Agnes Dengchhungi

Aloysius Thanglura (3 December 1926 – 9 September 1994) was an Indian politician from modern-day Mizoram. He was a Member of Parliament, representing Assam in the Rajya Sabha, the upper house of India's parliament. He was the first Mizo law graduate and first advocate to practice in the Assam High Court. He was also the first and last Mizo Cabinet Minister in the government of Assam.

== Early life ==
Aloysius Thanglura was born on 3 December 1926 in Sairang village, Lushai Hills District, British India. He passed his Intermediate in science at St. Anthony's College and continued his studies with a Bachelors in English at Cotton College, Gauhati. A. Thanglura did his Bachelor of Law at Gauhati University in 1950. Before joining politics, he wrote articles in the Assam Tribune.

== Political career ==
Thanglura was elected in the 1957 Assam Legislative Assembly election as a Mizo Union candidate. He was given the post of Parliamentary Secretary and was later appointed as Chief Parliamentary Secretary. Simultaneously he also held the post of Deputy Chief Whip of Congress Party of Assam.

He was one of the leaders of the Hill State Movement which demanded a separate tribal state in Northeast India and became the first chairman of the APHLC in 1960. However, Thanglura left the APHLC to form the Mizoram District Congress at Aizawl in 1961.

He was elected to the Rajya Sabha in 1962. In the 1967 elections, he was elected as MLA from Aizawl East and West constituencies and as a result of which he relinquished his Rajya Sabha and Aizawl East seats and was subsequently sworn in as a Cabinet Minister of Assam. Thus, A. Thanglura became the first and last Cabinet Minister of Assam from the Mizo District before it was elevated into a Union Territory.

== Personal life ==
A. Thanglura was born to Chhawnthanga and Hualhnawlhi. His father worked as a forwarding clerk under the colonial British administration at Sairang. He was later made Assistant Sub-Inspector of Police by the Superintendent of Lushai Hills. He was however compulsorily retired after getting on the bad side of the white dominated colonial Indian Tea Association.

Thanglura died on 9 September 1994 at Shillong. He was 67 years old.

== Legacy ==
Thanglura continues to be remembered for his oratory skills; his statements often drew both ire and amusement from his subjects. After his retirement from active politics he wrote two books:

- Zoram politik inlumlet dan
- Mihrâng leh Sahrâng I & II

"Zoram politik inlumlet dan" provides an important firsthand insight to the political history of Mizoram. It is widely recognized as one of the best book on Mizo political history written.

== See also ==
- Mizo Union
- Raymond Thanhlira, fellow Mizo Union member and Rajya Sabha member
- R. Rothuama, fellow MP from Mizoram

== Books ==
- Thanglura, A. (1982). ZORAM POLITIC INLUMLET DAN [The Unfurling of the Politics of Zoram]. Shillong.
- Nunthara, C (1996). Mizoram: Society and Polity. New Delhi: Indus Publishing Company. ISBN 81-7387-059-4.
