= Surendra Nath Buragohain =

Indian politician and lawyer (1904–1953)

Union Deputy Minister of Works, Housing and Supply (Note: Appointed Deputy Minister of Works, Mines and Power on 14 August 1950; the portfolio became Works, Housing and Supply in May 1952.)
- In office 14 August 1950 – 4 October 1953
- Prime Minister: Jawaharlal Nehru
- Preceded by: Office established
- Succeeded by: Anil Kumar Chanda

Member of Parliament, Lok Sabha
- In office 17 April 1952 – 4 October 1953
- Preceded by: Constituency established
- Succeeded by: Bimala Prasad Chaliha
- Constituency: Sibsagar North Lakhimpur

Member of the Provisional Parliament
- In office 1950–1952

Minister for Local Self-Government, Excise and Labour, Assam
- In office 23 March 1945 – 11 February 1946

Personal details
- Born: 17 November 1904 Jorhat, Assam, British India
- Died: 4 October 1953 (aged 48)
- Spouse: Bedavati Baruah (m. 1932)
- Children: 2
- Parent: Lokeswar Buragohain (father)
- Education: Cotton College; Earle Law College

Surendra Nath Buragohain (17 November 1904 – 4 October 1953) was an Indian lawyer and politician from Assam. He was a minister in the provincial government of Muhammed Saadulah in 1945–46 and general secretary of the All People's Party, and later sat in the Provisional Parliament and in the first Lok Sabha. From 1950 until his death he was a union deputy minister in the first and second ministries of Jawaharlal Nehru; the district administration of Jorhat describes him as the first minister in the central government from Assam.

== Early life and education ==
Buragohain was born on 17 November 1904 in Jorhat, in the province of Assam in British India. He was the son of Lokeswar Buragohain and a descendant of several Burhagohains, the prime ministers of the Ahom kingdom before British rule in Assam. Lokeswar was the son of Durgeswar Buragohain and the grandson of Muhidhar Buragohain, who was in turn the son of the Burhagohain Ruchinath and the grandson of Purnananda Burhagohain.

He was educated at Jorhat government high school, at Cotton College and at Earle Law College, and practised as an advocate at the high court in Assam before entering politics.

== Provincial politics ==
Buragohain was elected to the Assam Legislative Assembly in 1943. Muhammed Saadulah resigned on 23 March 1945 in order to reconstitute his ministry, and Buragohain was one of the ten members of the coalition cabinet that Saadulah then formed. He held local self-government, excise and labour until the ministry came to an end in February 1946.

He was elected general secretary of the All People's Party, founded in 1945 by Ahom notables in opposition to the Indian National Congress.

== Parliament and union office ==
Buragohain was a member of the Provisional Parliament from 1950 to 1952, and on 14 August 1950 was appointed a union deputy minister under Nehru. At the first general election he was returned to the Lok Sabha for Sibsagar North Lakhimpur, and he remained a deputy minister until his death.

== Personal life and death ==
Buragohain married Bedavati Baruah on 25 January 1932 and they had one son and one daughter. His widow, Bedavati Buragohain, later served as a member of the Rajya Sabha.

Buragohain died on 4 October 1953.
