= Rwngwra Narzary =

Indian politician

Member of Parliament, Rajya Sabha
- Incumbent
- Assumed office 3 April 2022
- Preceded by: Ripun Bora
- Constituency: Assam

Working President of United People's Party Liberal
- Incumbent
- Assumed office 2020
- Preceded by: N/A

Chairman of Kajalgaon Municipal Board
- Preceded by: N/A
- Succeeded by: N/A

Personal details
- Born: 1 March 1970 (age 56) Bongaigaon, Assam, India
- Party: United People's Party Liberal
- Other political affiliations: National Democratic Alliance; North-East Democratic Alliance
- Education: B. A.
- Alma mater: Bongaigaon College

Rwngwra Narzary (born 1 March 1970) is an Indian politician who is serving as the Member of Parliament, representing Assam in the Rajya Sabha since 2022 as a member of the United People's Party, Liberal (UPPL). He is working President of UPPL since 2020. He is also chairman of the Kajalgaon Municipal Board.
