= Jibesh Rai =

Indian politician (born 1985)

Jibesh Rai (born 1985) is an Indian politician from the northeastern state of Assam. He was a member of the Assam Legislative Assembly from the Bilasipara Assembly constituency in Dhubri district representing the Asom Gana Parishad.

Rai is from Bilasipara, Dhubri district, Assam. He is the son of Sri Pabitra Roy. He serves as the Chief Executive Member of Kamatapur Autonomous Council. He completed his B.A. at Fakiragram College which is affiliated with Gauhati University in 2007. He declared assets worth Rs.90 lakhs in his affidavit to the Election Commission of India.

== Career ==
Rai won the Bilasipara Assembly constituency representing the Asom Gana Parishad in the 2026 Assam Legislative Assembly election. He polled 85,937 votes and defeated his nearest rival, Amit Badsha of the Indian National Congress, by a margin of 2,694 votes.
