= Tezpur Central Jail =

Prison in Assam, India

- Location in Assam Tezpur Central Jail (India)
- Location: Guwahati, Assam; 26.6216°N 92.8019°E
- Status: Operating
- Security class: Maximum
- Capacity: 1000
- Population: 1284 (15 May 2018)
- Opened: 1881
- Managed by: Assam Prisons
- Website: prisons.assam.gov.in

Tezpur Central Jail is a prison located in the Sonitpur district of Assam, India. It is one of 31 prisons located in the state of Assam.

== History ==
The Tezpur Jail was set up in 1846. It has been declared a Central Jail now. The total area of the jail premises is a little over 30 acres. The jail enclosure itself is situated on about 9 acres of land. All the buildings do not really date back to 1846 but they are all very old.

== Major cases ==
At least 28 inmates of the Tezpur Central Jail in Assam have tested positive for the dreaded COVID-19 virus on Wednesday, 29 July 2021. According to reports, as many as 40 prison inmates were tested using the rapid antigen method, out of which 28 inmates tested positive for the dreaded contagion. With this, the number of Tezpur Jail inmates. With this, the number of Tezpur Jail inmates who have tested positive for the dreaded contagion has risen to 56 inmates.

A prisoner of Tezpur Central Jail Lalit Nayak, serving life term since 2005 has allegedly committed suicide by jumping into a well in the jail premises.

== Notable prisoners ==
Mrinmoy Dawka, the superintendent of Tezpur Central jail in Sonitpur district, was arrested on Thursday following complaints of sexual assault by two women. There were two complaints against the accused. He had allegedly sexually assaulted the wife of an inmate on the promise of releasing her husband. The second case is of him outraging the modesty of the wife of a jail warden," said Mugdhajyoti Dev Mahanta, superintendent of police (SP), Sonitpur.

Dhabua Rajowar was arrested in March 1997 for the murder of his own mother. Apparently, he was suffering from mental illness at the time of the murder. He was placed in judicial custody on 24/03/97 and never secured bail. On 4/03/2002 he was sentenced to life imprisonment. Altogether he has been in jail for 11 years and 8 months.
