= Biswa Goswami =

Indian politician

Member of Parliament, Rajya Sabha
- In office 1980–1986
- Constituency: Assam

Personal details
- Born: December 1921
- Died: 1987
- Party: Janata Party

Biswa Goswami (1921–1987) was an Indian politician. He represented Assam in the Rajya Sabha, the upper house of India's Parliament, as a member of the Janata Party.
