= Bimla Kashyap Sood =

Indian politician, social worker

MP-Rajya Sabha
- In office 2010–2016
- Constituency: Himachal Pradesh

Personal details
- Born: 26 February 1942
- Party: Bhartiya Janta Party
- Spouse: Late Shrawan Kashyap Sood
- Education: Punjab University
- Profession: Social worker, Politician

Bimla Kashyap Sood (born 26 February 1942) is an Indian politician, Social worker and a member of parliament (Rajya Sabha) elected from Himachal Pradesh, India being a Bharatiya Janata Party candidate.

== Early life and education ==
Kashyap Sood was born in Chail village in Solan district in the Indian state of Himachal Pradesh. She is a graduate of Punjab University, Punjab in Bachelor of Arts. She married Shrawan Kashyap Sood on 11 June 1962. She has one son and two daughters.

== Career ==
In 1990s, Kashyap Sood was actively involved in literacy campaign in Himachal Pradesh through a Non-Government Organisation "Lotus Welfare Society". In 1999, she founded "Manavi", an N.G.O. aimed at family counselling and women's welfare. During 1998–2003, she held Councillor post in Municipal Corporation, Shimla, Director at "Himachal Pradesh State Co-operative Bank", "Himachal Pradesh State Handicrafts and Handloom Corporation Ltd." and director of "Mahila Vikas Nigam", Shimla.

She was elected to Rajya Sabha in April 2010. She served as a member of Consultative Committee for the Ministry of Women and Child Development, Committee on water resources and Committee on transport, tourism and culture.
