= Shriram Pal =

Indian politician (born 1960)

Shriram Pal (born 5 May 1954 in Jalaun district) is an Indian politician from Uttar Pradesh who belongs to the Bahujan Samaj Party

He was a member of the Rajya Sabha during 2009-2010 from Uttar Pradesh.
