= Sriman Prafulla Goswami =

Indian politician (1911–2006)

Sriman Prafulla Goswami (2 February 1911 – 27 June 2006) was a politician from Indian State of Assam. He was member of Assam legislative assembly during 1952–57, 1957–62 and 1962–67.

In Council of States, the Rajya Sabha he represent the Assam state during 1967–72 and 1974–80.

He also served the Oil India Limited as its chairman between 1972 and 1974. He died on 27 June 2006 at Guwahati at the age of 96. He had six children with wife Usha: four sons and two daughters.
