= Basanti Sarma =

Indian politician

Member of Parliament, Rajya Sabha
- In office 1991–2002
- Constituency: Assam

Personal details
- Born: 1 March 1944
- Party: Indian National Congress

Basanti Sarma (born 1 March 1944) is an Indian politician. She was a Member of Parliament, representing Assam in the Rajya Sabha, the upper house of India's Parliament, as a member of the Indian National Congress.
