= Bedavati Buragohain =

Indian politician

Member of Parliament, Rajya Sabha
- In office 3 April 1954 – 2 April 1966
- Constituency: Assam

Personal details
- Born: Bedavati Baruah; 19 November 1911 North Lakhimpur, Assam Province, British India
- Died: 16 December 2000 (aged 89)
- Party: Indian National Congress
- Spouse: Surendra Nath Buragohain (m. 1932; died 1953)
- Children: 2
- Parent: Bapuram Baruah (father)

Bedavati Buragohain (née Baruah; 19 November 1911 – 16 December 2000) was an Indian politician and educator. She was a member of Parliament, representing Assam in the Rajya Sabha the upper house of India's Parliament as a member of the Indian National Congress.

== Early life ==
Buragohain was born at North Lakhimpur on 19 November 1911, the daughter of Bapuram Baruah.

== Career ==
Buragohain became a teacher, and was a member of the Rajya Sabha from 1954 to 1966.

== Personal life and death ==
Buragohain married Surendra Nath Buragohain in January 1932, and together they had one son and daughter.

Bedavati Buragohain died on 16 December 2000, aged 89.
