= Nand Kishore Yadav (SP) =

Indian politician

Shri Nand Kishore Yadav a politician from Samajwadi Party was a Member of the Parliament of India representing Uttar Pradesh in the Rajya Sabha, the upper house of the Indian Parliament for a term serving 2004–2010. He is the son of former Rajya Sabha MP and founding member of Samajwadi party Late Ish Dutt Yadav. He belongs to Azamgarh district in Uttar Pradesh.
