= Robin Kakati =

Indian politician

Member of Parliament, Rajya Sabha
- In office 1978–1984
- In office 1962-1968
- Constituency: Assam

Personal details
- Born: 9 September 1909
- Died: 6 March 1996 (aged 86)
- Party: Janata Party
- Other political affiliations: Indian National Congress

Robin Kakati (1909-1996) was an Indian politician. He was a Member of Parliament, representing Assam in the Rajya Sabha, the upper house of India's Parliament as a member of the Janata Party.
