= Bilasipara Assembly constituency =

Assembly constituency of Assam

Bilasipara
- Constituency No. 10 for the Assam Legislative Assembly

Constituency details
- Country: India
- Region: Northeast India
- State: Assam
- Division: Lower Assam
- District: Dhubri
- Lok Sabha constituency: Dhubri
- Established: 2023
- Reservation: None

Member of Legislative Assembly
- 16th Assam Legislative Assembly
- Incumbent Jibesh Rai
- Party: AGP
- Alliance: NDA
- Elected year: 2026

Bilasipara Assembly constituency is one of the 126 assembly constituencies of Assam, a north-east state of India. It was newly formed in 2023.

== Election Results ==
=== 2026 ===
2026 Assam Legislative Assembly election: Bilasipara
Party	Candidate	Votes	%	±%
AGP	Jibesh Rai	85,937	48.09	
INC	Amrit Badsha	83,243	46.59	
AIUDF	Sabana Aktar	4,350	2.43	
Independent	Sheikh Hedayetullah	2,134	1.19	
AITC	Momimur Islam	1,241	0.69	
RUC	Hakimul Islam	618	0.35	
NOTA	NOTA	1,163	0.65	
Margin of victory		2,694	1.50	
Turnout		1,78,686		
AGP gain from INC		Swing		

== See also ==
- Dhubri district
- List of constituencies of Assam Legislative Assembly
- Government of Assam
- Government of India
