= Usha Barthakur =

Indian politician (1912–1993)

Member of Parliament, Rajya Sabha
- In office 1966-1972
- Constituency: Assam

Personal details
- Born: 1912
- Died: 1993 (aged 80-81)
- Party: Indian National Congress

Usha Barthakur (1912–1993) was an Indian politician. She was a Member of Parliament, representing Assam in the Rajya Sabha the upper house of India's Parliament as a member of the Indian National Congress. She was a student of St Mary's college in Shillong.
