= Dharam Pal Sabharwal =

Indian politician

Shri Dharam Pal Sabharwal a politician from Indian National Congress party is a Member of the Parliament of India representing Punjab in the Rajya Sabha, the upper house of the Indian Parliament.
