= Lila Dhar Barooah =

Indian politician (1908–1973)

Member of Parliament, Rajya Sabha
- In office 1958-1966
- Constituency: Assam

Personal details
- Born: 8 March 1908
- Died: 19 February 1973 (aged 64)
- Party: Indian National Congress
- Spouse: Girija Barooah

Lila Dhar Barooah (1908–1973) was an Indian politician. He was a Member of Parliament, representing Assam in the Rajya Sabha, the upper house of India's Parliament as a member of the Indian National Congress.
