= Mizo Union =

Indian political party (1946– 1974)

Mizo Union (6 April 1946 – 12 January 1974) was the first political party in Mizoram, in Northeast India. It was founded on 6 April 1946 at Aizawl as the Mizo Common People's Union. At the time of independence of India from British rule in India in 1947, the party was the only political force in the Lushai Hills (former name of Mizoram). It won the first Mizoram District Council general election under the new Indian Union in 1951, and consecutively in 1957, 1962 and 1966.

However, the mautam (bamboo famine) of 1958 and its protégé insurgency in 1966 downgraded its status, so that the party was compelled to dissolve in 1974 and merged with the Indian National Congress.

== History ==
Mizo Union was the upshot of administrative preparation when the British rule in India was about to end. The British administrators initiated forming local representatives to maintain law and order. However, the Mizo leaders, especially the central organisation Young Lushai Association (YLA), preferred complete independence from India and started a boycott against British orders. At the onset, there even was a proposal to turn YLA into a political party. The learned men were urged the need to create an entirely political organisation. R. Vanlawma and P.S. Dahrawka then prepared a constitution of what they eventually called the Mizo Common People's Union. After recruiting members, the party was formally established on 6 April 1946 with R. Vanlawma becoming the General Secretary and Convener. After a discussion the name was simplified to Mizo Union and the first officials were elected on 25 May 1946. The premier businessman Pachhunga became the first president.

Immediately, the party gained unprecedented support from the general public throughout the land. This was largely because of the general anachronistic attitude towards tribal chiefdom and their British allies, who wearied them with levies and forced labour. But the momentum of popularity had its drawbacks. The freshly educated recruits formed an intellectual group and usurped against the party leaders, who were not highly educated, which was the main issue. The intellectuals mounted a coup in the party's first general meeting on 24–26 September of that year, which led to the resignation of Pachhunga and elimination of other leaders. The only remaining original official, Vice President Lalhema, became the president, but he was also a petty businessman and still had a deficit in education. The issue erupted in the November meeting, and an election in early 1947 clearly toppled Lalhema, who was ousted by Khawtinkhuma, a fresh master's degree holder from Tripura. The trailblazers were forced to unite into an offshoot party. which they named the Mizo Union Council. This for a time formed a public and religious chasms in Aizawl as the Mizo Union was supported by the educated class and commoners and also mostly by church leaders. The new party was espoused by the influences of the philanthropist Pachhunga, who were mostly well-to-do entrepreneurs and the tribal chiefs. Thus Aizawl was divided into a southern Mizo Union dominion with its headquarters at Thakthing and northern Mizo Union Council territory having its office at Pachhunga's residence at Dawrpui.

=== UMFO ===
In early 1947m Khawtinkhuma was offered a regular government job and was succeeded by Pastor Zairema, who was supported by the Presbyterian Church, on 18 January. But there was an internal turmoil incited by Lalbiaktluanga, who as the Vice President rightly claimed the presidency but to no avail. The dispirited Lalbiaktluanga and his sympathisers departed with the creation of a new party, the United Mizo Freedom Organisation (UMFO), on 5 July 1947. The main propaganda of UMFO was to join the administrative state of Burma instead of India or independence. the UMFO eventually absorbed the supporters of the Mizo Union Council, thereby becoming the only political rival. At the election to Advisory Council of Mizoram, the first democratic election under independent India, Mizo Union received a massive win (23 against 1 for UMFO). That resulted in the loss of Burma inclination and also to the eventual demise of the UMFO.

When the Mizoram District Council was created by the Government of India, the first general election in April 1952 was cleanly captured by Mizo Union (17 out of 18 electorates), and President Lalsawia became the first Chief Executive Member.

=== Dedecline ===
If one person is to be singled out for the rise and fall of Mizo Union, it would invariably be an astute Ch. Saprawnga. From the start he was the instigator of the first coup in 1946. When the party won the first governmental election in 1952, Mizoram was a district of Assam, and Saprawnga as the leader of Assam Legislative Assembly members from Mizoram and was offered as an honour the position on Parliamentary Secretary under the ruling Assam Congress Party. The ever-strategic Saprawnga declined and unexpectedly returned to the Mizoram District and cast a motion of no confidence against CEM Lalsawia, whom he eventually replaced. The ingenious Saprawnga then designated Lalsawia as an executive member to the dismay of the party, especially President R. Thanhlira. After feud and friction in the party, Thanhlira conceded to resigning the presidency.

That led to factional divide of the party into two, Saprawnga's and Lalsawia's sides. The split in the party paid a serious blow when they almost lost to UMFO (11 against 8) in the 1957 election. To the blessing of Saprawnga, UMFO and Lalsawia with his clique decided to join a Meghalaya-based Eastern India Tribal Union (EITU) party in October 1957, so that Saprawnga was left with the sole political party of the land.

=== Dissolution ===
The principal goal of the Mizo Union, to subjugate customary tribal administration, was quite fulfilled by the creation of the democratic administration of the District Council. However, other causes independence and Greater Mizoram, were not. The original aspiration of sovereignty was immediately subdued, and the attempt for unification of all Mizo tribes into a united state was a total failure. Instead, the party was more and more engrossed in the Indian politics to the disappointment of many, whuich was one of the basic factors of the rise of Mizo National Front and the eventual uprising.

The party had no agenda for promotion of ethnic identity and social backlashes. The shortcoming was compounded by the 1959 famine, as the ruling party was held incapable of solving the socio-economic crisis, and was accused of indifference towards the suffering of the people. That prompted the organisation of Mizo National Front, which attempted to alleviate the situation and had a renewed struggle for independence. Theoe policies, as before, were closer to the sentiments of the people, and actually the sealed the fate of the Mizo Union. A scheduled 1966 election could not be held because of the insurgency, and internal politics as a whole was crushed. The Mizo Union was gradually disintegrating. The party assembly on 12 January 1974 therefore resolved to dissolve the party entirely and merged with Mizoram Pradesh Congress Committee. Although a few devotees of the party recreated the Mizo Union Party on 17 March 1974, they failed to make political landmarks.

== Ideology ==
The Mizo Union arose from the irate commoners of anachronism of the tribal administrative system in which a tribal chief had an absolute power on the welfare of the citizens, and that most often was exercised in prejudice. The original bearing "Common" was expressly clear that it was a force to overthrow the oppressive tribal governance of the chiefs, which was further exploited by the British. For that reason alone, it readily gained support from the majority of the population.

The 1947 conference explicitly voted against the oppressive tribal administration and demanded the total abolition of construction works by forced labour, paddy tax to the chief, the chief's authoritative judgement of disputes the meat tax to the chief. The Mizo Union's other central motive was to claim independent and sovereign state for Mizoram, instead of becoming a part of India. This aspiration also carried the unification of all Mizo clans into a single administrative area, that is to bring all lands inhabited by Mizo tribes including those of Cachar, Manipur, Tripura and Chin Hills into a united state. On the eve of the Indian Independence the party organised the firs- ever grand procession in Mizoram in which they cried out the slogan of independence. On the day of independence on 15 August 1947, they planned for a more jubilant demonstration. However, the Mizo Union Council, which had turned to patronise the tribal chiefs, warned them of physical opposition to such protest march even to the extent of taking up arms, and the rally was called off for fear of bloodshed.

The political aspiration shifted its direction when the intellectual group overtook the party administration. Although the fundamental objective remained independence, there was an influential view that the party should go for autonomy of some sort under Indian. Leaders of the party were on good terms with the Indian National Congress. The first General Assembly in 1946 had resolved that upon Indian independence, the Lushai Hills must be integrated to Assam. It was then in January 1947 that President Khawtinkhuma and Secretary Vanṭhuama wrote to the President of the Constituent Assembly of India that representative of the Mizo Union should be included in the Advisory Committee for the Tribal Areas of Assam. They submitted a memorandum to the Bordoloi Committee that they agreed the incorporation of the then Lushai Hills to India but on the condition "that the Lushai's will be allowed to opt out of the Indian Union when willing to do so subject to a minimum period of ten years".

At the turn of 1960, the attitude redirected towards permanent statehood under India. The party convention on 10 June 1963 made a resolution to demand for a Mizo state, which should include all Mizo-inhabited areas of Lushai Hills, Tripura, Assam and Manipur.

== Notable members ==
- A. Thanglura, Assam Cabinet Minister and MP
- Raymond Thanhlira, MP and Chairman of Assam Public Service commission

== See also ==
- United Mizo Freedom Organisation
- Mizo National Front
