= Emonsing M Sangma =

Indian politician

Emonsing M Sangma (born 17 March 1913 in Sandong Songma) was a politician from the Indian state of Assam and member of Assam Legislative Assembly during 1952–56. He got reelected for the 1962–1967 term.

He was elected to Rajya Sabha, from Assam during by-election in 1967 for term till 1970 and for full term of 1970–1976 as an INC candidate.
