= Raymond Thanhlira =

Indian politician

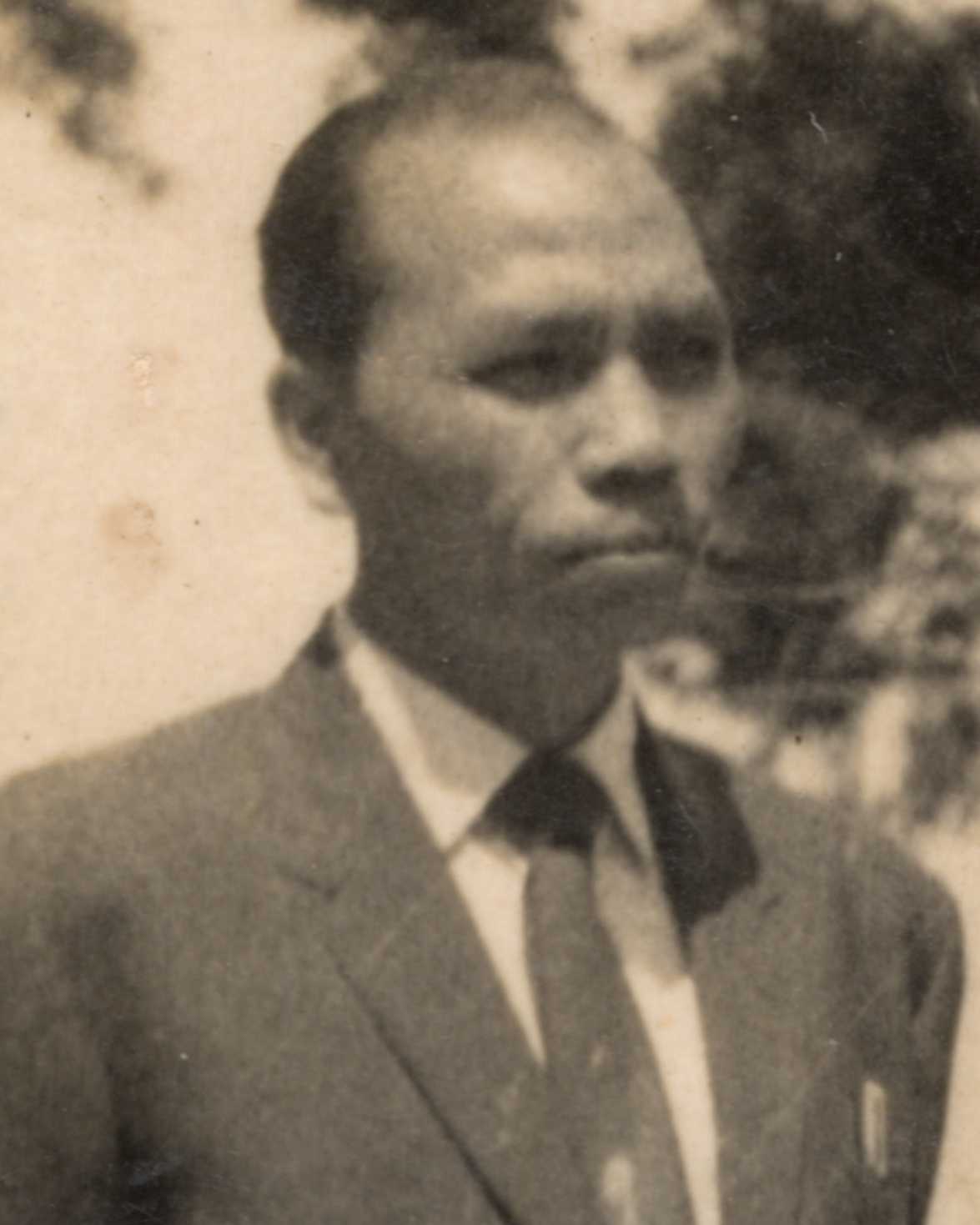
- Thanhlira in 1965

Member of Parliament, Rajya Sabha
- In office 3 March 1952 - 2 March 1958
- Constituency: Assam

Chairman of Assam Public Service Commission
- In office 1968-1974

Personal details
- Born: 1917
- Died: 2002 (aged 84-85)
- Party: Indian National Congress; Mizo Union
- Spouse: M.M. Hmingliani
- Education: St. Anthony's College, Shillong

Raymond Thanhlira was an Indian politician from modern-day Mizoram (then Assam). He was a Member of Parliament, representing Assam in the Rajya Sabha the upper house of India's Parliament as a member of the Indian National Congress. He was also the chairman of Assam Public Service Commission from 30 August 1968 till the end of his term in 1974. He was the first Scheduled Tribe person from Northeast India to be elected to the Rajya Sabha.

== Early life ==
Raymond graduated from St. Anthony's College, Shillong in 1941. He served in World War II as a non-combat clerk. During his four years and nine months, R. Thanhlira was decorated with four medals such as 1939-1945 Star, Africa Star, Defence Medal and War Medal.

== Political career ==
Raymond joined the Mizo Union on May 13, 1947 as vice president and was elected as president on November 1, 1948 which he held the post till October 1950. He was a member of the Rajya Sabha from April 3, 1952 to April 2, 1958.

In 1952, He moved a private resolution to end the system of forced unpaid labour in the Lushai Hills District, a colonial legacy left by the British Raj. He withdrew his resolution after receiving assurance from the Assamese government to end the practice, which they did. He also presented a government bill to change the name of the Lushai Hills District to Mizo District to promote unity between the different tribes living in the district.

== See also ==
- A. Thanglura, fellow Mizo Union politician and Rajya Sabha member.
- Mizo Union
