= Silvius Condpan =

Indian politician

Member of Parliament, Rajya Sabha
- In office 2004 — 2011
- Succeeded by: Pankaj Bora
- Constituency: Assam

Personal details
- Political party: Indian National Congress

Shri Silvius Condpan, a politician from the Indian National Congress party, was a Member of the Parliament of India representing Assam in the Rajya Sabha, the upper house of the Indian Parliament.

The Rajya Sabha vacancy caused by his demise has been filled by Pankaj Bora, former Minister in the Assam government. He was born in July 1938 at Sonitpur District, Assam.

== Death ==
He died in Delhi on 10 October 2011 of complications from diabetes.
