= 2024 Indian general election in Mizoram =

Indian political election in Mizoram

- 19 April 2024

1 Mizoram seat in the Lok Sabha
- Opinion polls
- Turnout: 56.87% (▼6.27%)
	First party	Second party
	ZPM	MNF
Leader	Richard Vanlalhmangaiha	K. Vanlalvena
Party	ZPM	MNF
Leader's seat	Mizoram	Mizoram
Last election	Supported Independent (43.26%, 0 seats)	44.89%, 1 seat
Seats won	1	0
Seat change	▲1	▼1
Percentage	42.45%	28.66%
Swing	▼0.81%	▼16.23%
- Map of the 2024 general election in Mizoram
Prime Minister before election
Narendra Modi
BJP
Prime Minister after election
Narendra Modi
BJP

The 2024 Indian general election was held in Mizoram on 19 April 2024 to elect one member of the 18th Lok Sabha.

== Election schedule ==
Poll event	Phase
Poll event	I
Notification date	20 March
Last date for filing nomination	27 March
Scrutiny of nomination	28 March
Last Date for withdrawal of nomination	30 March
Date of poll	19 April
Date of counting of votes/Result	4 June 2024
No. of constituencies	1

== Parties and alliances ==
=== Mizo National Front ===
Mizo National Front

Party	Symbol	Leader	Seats contested
Mizo National Front		K. Vanlalvena	1

=== Zoram People's Movement ===
Zoram People's Movement

Party	Symbol	Leader	Seats contested
Zoram People's Movement		Richard Vanlalhmangaiha	1

=== Indian National Developmental Inclusive Alliance ===
Indian National Developmental Inclusive Alliance

Party	Flag	Symbol	Leader	Seats contested
Indian National Congress			Lalbiakzama	1

=== National Democratic Alliance ===
National Democratic Alliance

Party	Flag	Symbol	Leader	Seats contested
Bharatiya Janata Party			Vanlalhmuaka	1

=== Others ===
Party	Symbol	Leader	Seats contested
Mizoram People's Conference		Rita Malsawmi	1

== Candidates ==
Constituency											
Constituency		MNF		ZPM		INDIA		NDA		Others	
1	Mizoram	MNF	K. Vanlalvena	ZPM	Richard Vanlalhmangaiha	INC	Lalbiakzama	BJP	Vanhlalmuaka	MPC	Rita Malsawmi

== Surveys and polls ==
=== Opinion polls ===
Polling agency	Date published	Margin of error					Lead
Polling agency	Date published	Margin of error	ZPM	NDA	INDIA	Others	Lead
ABP News-CVoter	March 2024	±5%	1	0	0	0	ZPM
India Today-CVoter	February 2024	±3-5%	1	0	0	0	ZPM
Times Now-ETG	December 2023	±3%	0	1	0	0	NDA
India TV-CNX	October 2023	±3%	0	1	0	0	NDA
Times Now-ETG	September 2023	±3%	0	1	0	0	NDA
Times Now-ETG	August 2023	±3%	0	1	0	0	NDA

=== Exit polls ===
Polling agency					Lead
Polling agency	ZPM	NDA	INDIA	Others	Lead
Actual results	1	0	0	0	ZPM

== Results ==
=== Results by alliance or party ===
Alliance/ Party		Popular vote			Seats		
Alliance/ Party		Votes	%	±pp	Contested	Won	+/−
ZPM		208,552	42.45%	▲42.45%	1	1	▲1
MNF		140,264	28.55%	▼16.34%	1	0	▼1
INDIA	INC	98,595	20.07%	▼0.01%	1	0	Steady
NDA	BJP	33,533	6.82%	▲1.07%	1	0	Steady
MPC		3,793	0.77%		1	0	Steady
IND		4,706	0.96%		1	0	Steady
NOTA		1,893	0.38%	▼0.12%			
Total		491,336	100%	-	6	1	-

=== Results by constituency ===
Constituency		Turnout	Winner					Runner-up					Margin
Constituency		Turnout	Party	Alliance	Candidate	Votes	%	Party	Alliance	Candidate	Votes	%	Margin
1	Mizoram	56.87%▼	ZPM	Others	Richard Vanlalhmangaiha	2,08,552	42.45%	MNF	Others	K. Vanlalvena	1,40,264	28.55%	68,288

== Assembly segments wise lead of Parties ==
2024 Mizoram Lok Sabha Election Assembly Wise Result Map

Party	Assembly segments	Position in Assembly (as of 2023 election)
Zoram People's Movement	37	27
Bharatiya Janata Party	2	2
Mizo National Front	1	10
Indian National Congress	0	1
Total	40	

== See also ==
- 2024 Indian general election in Nagaland
- 2024 Indian general election in Odisha
- 2024 Indian general election in Puducherry
