= Mizoram Lok Sabha constituency =

Lok Sabha Constituency in Mizoram

Coordinates: 23.36°N 92.00°E

Mizoram MZ-1
- Lok Sabha constituency
- Location of Mizoram in India

Constituency details
- Country: India
- Region: Northeast India
- State: Mizoram
- Assembly constituencies: 40:(District - MAMIT) Hachhek(ST), Dampa(ST), Mamit(ST), (District - KOLASIB) Tuirial(ST), Kolasib(ST), Serlui(ST), (District - AIZAWL)Tuivawl(ST), Chalfilh(ST), Tawi(ST), Aizawl North 1(ST), Aizawl North 2(ST), Aizawl North 3(ST), Aizawl East 1, Aizawl East 2(ST), Aizawl West 1(ST), Aizawl West 2(ST), Aizawl West 3(ST), Aizawl South 1(ST), Aizawl South 2(ST), Aizawl South 3(ST), (District - CHAMPHAI) Lengteng(ST), Tuichang(ST), Champhai North(ST), Champhai South(ST), East Tuipui(ST), (District - SERCHHIP) Serchhip(ST), Tuikum(ST), Hrangturzo(ST), (District - LUNGLEI) South Tuipui(ST), Lunglei North(ST), Lunglei East(ST), Lunglei West(ST), Lunglei South(ST), Thorang(ST), West Tuipui(ST) ,(District - LAWNGTLAI) Tuichawng(ST), Lawngtlai West(ST), Lawngtlai East(ST), (District - SAIHA) Saiha(ST), Palak(ST)
- Established: 1972
- Total electors: 8,56,364
- Reservation: ST

Member of Parliament
- 18th Lok Sabha
- Incumbent Richard Vanlalhmangaiha
- Party: ZPM
- Alliance: None
- Elected year: 2024

Mizoram Lok Sabha constituency is the only Lok Sabha (lower house of the Indian parliament) constituency in the Northeast Indian state of Mizoram, and covers the entire area of the state. The seat is reserved for Scheduled Tribes. Its first member of parliament (MP) was Sangliana of the Mizo Union who represented this constituency in the Fifth Lok Sabha when it became a union territory on 21 January 1972. On 20 February 1987, Mizoram was converted into a State of India. As of the 2024 elections, this constituency's MP is Richard Vanlalhmangaiha of the Zoram People's Movement.

== Assembly segments ==
Presently, the Mizoram Lok Sabha constituency comprises the following forty Legislative Assembly segments:

| AC | Assembly | District | Party | Lead (2024) |
|---|---|---|---|---|
| 1 | Hachhek (ST) | Mamit | MNF | ZPM |
| 2 | Dampa (ST) | Mamit | MNF | ZPM |
| 3 | Mamit (ST) | Mamit | MNF | ZPM |
| 4 | Tuirial (ST) | Kolasib | MNF | ZPM |
| 5 | Kolasib (ST) | Kolasib | ZPM | ZPM |
| 6 | Serlui (ST) | Kolasib | MNF | ZPM |
| 7 | Tuivawl (ST) | Aizawl | MNF | MNF |
| 8 | Chalfilh (ST) | Aizawl | ZPM | ZPM |
| 9 | Tawi (ST) | Aizawl | ZPM | ZPM |
| 10 | Aizawl North 1 (ST) | Aizawl | ZPM | ZPM |
| 11 | Aizawl North 2 (ST) | Aizawl | ZPM | ZPM |
| 12 | Aizawl North 3 (ST) | Aizawl | ZPM | ZPM |
| 13 | Aizawl East 1 (ST) | Aizawl | ZPM | ZPM |
| 14 | Aizawl East 2 (ST) | Aizawl | ZPM | ZPM |
| 15 | Aizawl West 1 (ST) | Aizawl | ZPM | ZPM |
| 16 | Aizawl West 2 (ST) | Aizawl | ZPM | ZPM |
| 17 | Aizawl West 3 (ST) | Aizawl | ZPM | ZPM |
| 18 | Aizawl South 1 (ST) | Aizawl | ZPM | ZPM |
| 19 | Aizawl South 2 (ST) | Aizawl | ZPM | ZPM |
| 20 | Aizawl South 3 (ST) | Aizawl | ZPM | ZPM |
| 21 | Lengteng (ST) | Champhai | ZPM | ZPM |
| 22 | Tuichang (ST) | Champhai | ZPM | ZPM |
| 23 | Champhai North (ST) | Champhai | ZPM | ZPM |
| 24 | Champhai South (ST) | Champhai | ZPM | ZPM |
| 25 | East Tuipui (ST) | Champhai | MNF | ZPM |
| 26 | Serchhip (ST) | Serchhip | ZPM | ZPM |
| 27 | Tuikum (ST) | Serchhip | ZPM | ZPM |
| 28 | Hrangturzo (ST) | Serchhip | ZPM | ZPM |
| 29 | South Tuipui (ST) | Lunglei | ZPM | ZPM |
| 30 | Lunglei North (ST) | Lunglei | ZPM | ZPM |
| 31 | Lunglei East (ST) | Lunglei | ZPM | ZPM |
| 32 | Lunglei West (ST) | Lunglei | ZPM | ZPM |
| 33 | Lunglei South (ST) | Lunglei | ZPM | ZPM |
| 34 | Thorang (ST) | Lunglei | MNF | ZPM |
| 35 | West Tuipui (ST) | Lunglei | MNF | ZPM |
| 36 | Tuichawng (ST) | Lawngtlai | MNF | ZPM |
| 37 | Lawngtlai West (ST) | Lawngtlai | INC | ZPM |
| 38 | Lawngtlai East (ST) | Lawngtlai | ZPM | ZPM |
| 39 | Saiha (ST) | Saiha | BJP | BJP |
| 40 | Palak (ST) | Saiha | BJP | BJP |

== Members of Parliament ==
| Election | Member | Party |
|---|---|---|
| 1971 | Sangliana | Mizo Union |
| 1977 | R. Rothuama | Independent |
| 1980 | R. Rothuama | Independent |
| 1984 | Lalduhoma | Indian National Congress |
| 1989 | C. Silvera | Indian National Congress |
| 1991 | C. Silvera | Indian National Congress |
| 1996 | C. Silvera | Indian National Congress |
| 1998 | H. Lallungmuana | Independent |
| 1999 | Vanlalzawma | Independent |
| 2004 | Vanlalzawma | Mizo National Front |
| 2009 | C. L. Ruala | Indian National Congress |
| 2014 | C. L. Ruala | Indian National Congress |
| 2019 | C. Lalrosanga | Mizo National Front |
| 2024 | Richard Vanlalhmangaiha | Zoram People's Movement |

== Election results ==
=== 2024 ===
2024 Indian general election: Mizoram
| Party | Candidate | Votes | % | ±% |
|---|---|---|---|---|
| ZPM | Richard Vanlalhmangaiha | 208,552 | 42.45 | |
| MNF | K. Vanlalvena | 140,264 | 28.55 | |
| INC | Lalbiakzama | 98,595 | 20.07 | |
| BJP | Vanlalhmuaka | 33,533 | 6.82 | |
| IND | Lalhriatrenga Chhangte | 4,706 | 0.96 | |
| MPC | Rita Malsawmi | 3,793 | 0.77 | |
| NOTA | None of the Above | 1,893 | 0.39 | |
| Majority | | 68,288 | 13.90 | |
| Turnout | | 491,828 | 57.10 | |
| Swing to ZPM from MNF | | Swing | | |

=== 2019 ===
2019 Indian general election: Mizoram
| Party | Candidate | Votes | % | ±% |
|---|---|---|---|---|
| MNF | C. Lalrosanga | 224,286 | 44.89 | |
| IND | Lalnghinglova Hmar | 216,146 | 43.26 | |
| BJP | Nirupam Chakma | 28,707 | 5.75 | |
| PRISMP (Note: Peoples Representation for Identity and Status of Mizoram) | TBC Lalvenchhunga | 13,323 | 2.67 | |
| IND | Lal Hriatrenga Chhangte | 12,675 | 2.54 | |
| NOTA | None of the Above | 2,509 | 0.50 | |
| IND | Lalthlamuani | 1,975 | 0.40 | |
| Majority | | 8,140 | 1.63 | |
| Turnout | | 500,347 | 63.14 | |
| Swing to MNF from INC | | Swing | | |

=== 2014 ===
2014 Indian general elections: Mizoram
| Party | Candidate | Votes | % | ±% |
|---|---|---|---|---|
| INC | C. L. Ruala | 2,10,485 | 48.59 | −16.99 |
| IND | Robert Romawia Royte | 2,04,331 | 47.17 | N/A |
| AAP | M. Lalmanzuala | 11,890 | 2.74 | N/A |
| NOTA | None of the above | 6,495 | 1.50 | N/A |
| Majority | | 6,154 | 1.42 | −32.00 |
| Turnout | | 4,33,201 | 61.95 | +10.15 |
| INC hold | | Swing | | |

=== 2009 ===
2009 Indian general elections: Mizoram
| Party | Candidate | Votes | % | ±% |
|---|---|---|---|---|
| INC | C. L. Ruala | 213,779 | 65.58 | |
| IND | Dr. H. Lallungmuana | 104,824 | 32.16 | |
| IND | Rualpawla | 4,089 | 1.25 | |
| NCP | Lalawmpuia Chhangte | 3,299 | 1.01 | |
| Margin of victory | | 108,955 | 33.42 | +26.63 |
| Turnout | | 325,991 | 51.80 | |
| INC gain from MNF | | Swing | | |

=== 2004 ===
2004 Indian general election: Mizoram
| Party | Candidate | Votes | % | ±% |
|---|---|---|---|---|
| MNF | Vanlalzawma | 182,864 | 52.46 | |
| IND | Dr. Laltluangliana Khiangte | 159,170 | 45.67 | |
| EU (Note: Ephraim Union) | Tlangdingliana | 6,512 | 1.87 | |
| Margin of victory | | 23,694 | 6.79 | −16.75 |
| Turnout | | 348,546 | | |
| MNF gain from Independent | | Swing | | |

=== 1999 ===
1999 Indian general election: Mizoram (ST)
| Party | Candidate | Votes | % | ±% |
|---|---|---|---|---|
| IND | Vanlalzawma | 171,557 | 58.80 | |
| IND | Rokamlova | 102,898 | 35.26 | |
| MDF | Mylai Hlychho | 8,444 | 2.89 | |
| IND | Rualpawla | 4,508 | 1.54 | |
| RJD | Lallianzuala | 2,132 | 0.73 | |
| EU | P. Saidinga | 1,578 | 0.54 | |
| LS | Lallawmsanga | 669 | 0.23 | |
| Majority | | 68,659 | 23.54 | |
| Turnout | | 293,513 | 65.31 | |
| Independent hold | | Swing | | |

=== 1998 ===
1998 Indian general election: Mizoram
| Party | Candidate | Votes | % | ±% |
|---|---|---|---|---|
| IND | H. Lallungmuana | 106,552 | 34.87 | N/A |
| INC | J. Lalsangzuala | 106,511 | 34.86 | −7.64 |
| MNF | R. Lalthangliana | 82,047 | 26.85 | −10.78 |
| BJP | P. L. Chhuma | 8,998 | 2.94 | N/A |
| RJD | Lalianzuala | 974 | 0.32 | N/A |
| IND | Zailiana | 494 | 0.16 | N/A |
| Margin of victory | | 41 | 0.01 | −4.86 |
| Turnout | | 307,767 | 69.56 | −3.85 |
| Independent gain from INC | | Swing | | |

=== 1996 ===
1996 Indian general election: Mizoram
| Party | Candidate | Votes | % | ±% |
|---|---|---|---|---|
| INC | C. Silvera | 126,191 | 42.50 | +4.42 |
| MNF | F. Lalremsiama | 111,710 | 37.63 | +3.54 |
| IND | Lalhmingthanga | 57,690 | 19.43 | N/A |
| IND | Lalthlamuana | 1,295 | 0.44 | N/A |
| Margin of victory | | 14,481 | 4.87 | +0.88 |
| Turnout | | 299,593 | 73.41 | +14.77 |
| INC hold | | Swing | | |

=== 1991 ===
1991 Indian general election: Mizoram
| Party | Candidate | Votes | % | ±% |
|---|---|---|---|---|
| INC | C. Silvera | 91,612 | 38.08 | −10.37 |
| MNF | Lalduhawma | 82,019 | 34.09 | +2.81 |
| JD | Thenphunga Sailo | 56,491 | 23.48 | N/A |
| IND | Chawngzika | 4,455 | 1.85 | N/A |
| IND | Paul T. K. Dawnga | 4,159 | 1.73 | N/A |
| IND | C. Thangmura | 1,511 | 0.63 | N/A |
| IND | Zohanmania Ralte | 348 | 0.14 | N/A |
| Margin of victory | | 9,593 | 3.99 | −13.18 |
| Turnout | | 242,999 | 58.64 | +0.38 |
| INC hold | | Swing | | |

=== 1989 ===
1989 Indian general election: Mizoram
| Party | Candidate | Votes | % | ±% |
|---|---|---|---|---|
| INC | C. Silvera | 109,571 | 48.45 | N/A |
| MNF | Zoramthanga | 70,749 | 31.28 | N/A |
| DP (Note: Democratic Party) | Malswma Colney | 43,667 | 19.31 | N/A |
| IND | Binde Basu Chakma | 2,159 | 0.95 | N/A |
| Margin of victory | | 38,822 | 17.17 | N/A |
| Turnout | | 228,202 | 58.26 | N/A |
| INC hold | | Swing | | |

=== General election 1984 ===
Shri Lalduhoma of the INC was elected to represent this constituency in the Eighth Lok Sabha.

=== 1980 ===
1980 Indian general election: Mizoram (ST)
| Party | Candidate | Votes | % | ±% |
|---|---|---|---|---|
| IND | R. Rothuama | 74,430 | 58.00 | |
| PPC (Note: People's Conference) | C. Venkunga | 53,891 | 42.00 | |
| Majority | | 20,539 | 16.00 | |
| Turnout | | 129,533 | 56.12 | |
| Independent hold | | Swing | | |

=== 1977 ===
1977 Indian general election: Mizoram
| Party | Candidate | Votes | % | ±% |
|---|---|---|---|---|
| IND | R. Rothuama | 53,350 | 52.97 | |
| INC | C. L. Ruala | 37,342 | 37.07 | |
| IND | H. K. Bawichhuaka | 8,534 | 8.47 | |
| IND | K. Sanglianchhungi | 1,499 | 1.49 | |
| Majority | | 16,008 | 15.90 | |
| Turnout | | 102,075 | 49.92 | |
| Swing to Independent from Mizo Union | | Swing | | |

=== General election 1972 ===
Mizoram's first MP was Sangliana of the Mizo Union who represented this constituency in the Fifth Lok Sabha after Mizoram became a union territory on 21 January 1972.

== See also ==
- List of constituencies of the Lok Sabha
