= List of deputy chief ministers of Mizoram =

Minister of Cabinet of Mizoram

Deputy Chief Minister of Mizoram
- Incumbent; None
- Abbreviation: DCM
- Member of: Cabinet of Mizoram; Mizoram Legislative Assembly
- Appointer: Governor of Mizoram

The deputy chief minister of Mizoram is a member of the Cabinet of Mizoram Government in the Government of Mizoram. Not a constitutional office, it seldom carries any specific powers. In the parliamentary system of government, the chief minister is treated as the "first among equals" in the cabinet; the position of deputy chief minister is used to bring political stability and strength within a coalition government.The position of deputy chief minister is not explicitly defined or mentioned in the Constitution of India. However, the Supreme Court of India has stated that the appointment of deputy chief ministers is not unconstitutional. The court has clarified that a deputy chief minister, for all practical purposes, remains a minister in the council of ministers headed by the chief minister and does not draw a higher salary or perks compared to other ministers.During the absence of the chief minister, the deputy-chief minister may chair cabinet meetings and lead the assembly majority. Various deputy chief ministers have also taken the oath of secrecy in line with the one that chief minister takes. This oath has also sparked controversies.

== List ==
#	Name (Constituency)	Term of office			Chief Minister	Party
1	Lal Thanhawla	1986	1987	1 year	Laldenga	Indian National Congress
2	Lalhmingthanga	1998	1998		Zoramthanga	Mizoram People's Conference
3	Tawnluia	15 December 2018	3 December 2023	4 years, 353 days	Zoramthanga	Mizo National Front

== Oath as the state deputy chief minister ==
The deputy chief minister serves five years in the office. The following is the oath of the Deputy chief minister of state:

I, <Name of Deputy Chief Minister>, do swear in the name of God/solemnly affirm that I will bear true faith and allegiance to the Constitution of India as by law established, that I will uphold the sovereignty and integrity of India, that I will faithfully and conscientiously discharge my duties as a Minister for the State of () and that I will do right to all manner of people in accordance with the Constitution and the law without fear or favour, affection or ill-will.

Oath of Secrecy

"I, [Name], do swear in the name of God / solemnly affirm that I will not directly or indirectly communicate or reveal to any person or persons any matter which shall be brought under my consideration or shall become known to me as a Minister for the State of [Name of State] except as may be required for the due discharge of my duties as such Minister.Oath of Office (Rinawmna Thutiam) "Kei, [Name of CM] hian, Pathian hmingin chhe ka vaanchia / thutak hriatpuiah ka vaia (or: rinawmna nena ka sawi thlang e), ram Danpui, Constitution of India nupui lehzual leh dik taka ka zah ang a, ka vawng nget tlat ang tih ka tiam a.

India ram thuneihna sang ber leh pumkhatna, Sovereignty and Integrity of India chu ka humhalh tlat ang a.

Chuan, Mizoram State Chief Minister hna leh ka duties te hi rinawm tak leh ka chhia leh tha hriatna dik tak hmangin, faithfully and conscientiously ka thawk ang tih ka tiam bawk e.

Mi tupawh, an dinhmun engpawh lo ni se—huatna emaw, duhsak bikna emaw (fear or favour, affection or ill-will) awm miah loin, Danpui leh a behbawm hna te hi dik takin ka kengkawh vek ang." B. Oath of Secrecy (Thurûk Vawn Rinawmna Thutiam) "Kei, [Name of CM] hian, Pathian hmingin chhe ka vaanchia / thutak hriatpuiah ka vaia (or: rinawmna nena ka sawi thlang e), Mizoram State-a Minister ka nihna anga ka hnathawh puala matter lo lang apiang leh ka hriat tura rawn chhawp chhuah reng reng te chu, mi dang hnenah ka puang chhuak lo ang a, ka hrilh ru dawn lo bawk (directly or indirectly communicate or reveal) tih ka tiam e. Mahse, ka Minister hna tha taka ka thawh nana thil disclose ngai a nih erawh chuan a dan anga kalpui a ni ang."

== See also ==
- List of current Indian deputy chief ministers
