= Lalrinpuii =

Indian politician (born 1962)

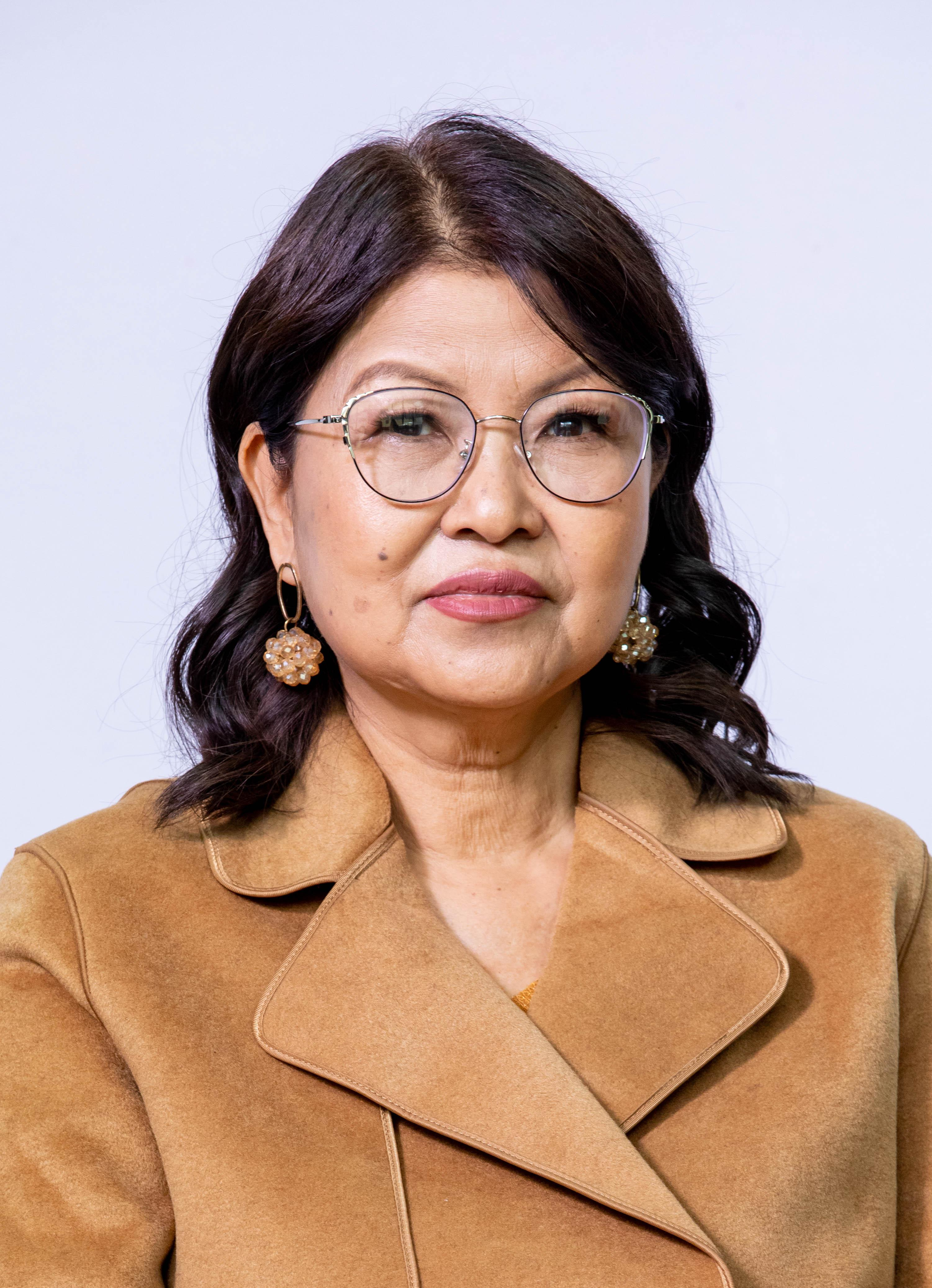
- Official portrait, 2024

Minister of Tourism of Mizoram
- Incumbent
- Assumed office 8 December 2023
- Governor: Kambhampati Hari Babu; V. K. Singh
- Chief Minister: Lalduhoma
- Preceded by: Robert Romawia Royte

Minister of Health and Family Welfare of Mizoram
- Incumbent
- Assumed office 8 December 2023
- Governor: Kambhampati Hari Babu; V. K. Singh
- Chief Minister: Lalduhoma
- Preceded by: R Lalthangliana

Minister of Social Welfare and Tribal Affairs of Mizoram
- Incumbent
- Assumed office 8 December 2023
- Governor: Kambhampati Hari Babu; V. K. Singh
- Chief Minister: Lalduhoma
- Preceded by: Lalrinawma

Member of the Mizoram Legislative Assembly
- Incumbent
- Assumed office December 2023
- Preceded by: Lawmawma Tochhawng
- Constituency: Lunglei East

Personal details
- Born: 15 October 1967 (age 58)
- Party: Zoram People's Movement (since 2017)
- Spouse: Sapthanga Khawlhring
- Education: BA
- Alma mater: Chhatrapati Shahu Ji Maharaj University

Lalrinpuii (born 5 March 1962) is an Indian politician in the state of Mizoram. She is a member of the Mizoram Legislative Assembly from the Lunglei East constituency of Lunglei district. She is the first woman to become a minister of Mizoram with cabinet rank on 8 December 2024 when she took oath as the Minister for health, social welfare and tribal affairs, women and child development, and tourism portfolios.

== Early life and education ==
Lalrinpuii was born in Lunglei, Mizoram. She completed her Bachelor of Arts (BA) in 2002 at a college affiliated with Chhatrapati Shahu Ji Maharaj University, Kanpur. She married Sapthanga Khawlhring and together they have three children. She runs hostels for students of North East studying in Bengaluru.

== Career ==
Before Lalrinpuii became a minister, Lalhlimpuii Hmar in 1987 and Vanlalawmpuii Chawngthu in 2017 were her two predecessors who held the rank of ministers of state. She was elected as an MLA representing the Zoram People's Movement party in the 2023 Mizoram Legislative Assembly elections, defeating Joseph Lalhimpuia of the Congress by a margin of 1646 votes. She is one of the three woman MLAs elected in the 2024 Assembly election. In 2018, she contested as an independent candidate but lost to Lawmawma Tochhawng of the Mizo National Front, by a margin of 72 votes. In 2018, she polled 3,991 votes, against 4063 votes for Tochhawng. She was ahead of Congress candidate Joseph Lalhimpuia, who got 3,836 votes.

In May 2025, she inaugurated an 'International Conference on Substance Use Disorder' and said that drug abuse impedes Mizo community's progress.
