= Gadiyara =

2020 Kannada movie

- Directed by: Prabhik Mogaveer
- Produced by: Prabhik Mogaveer
- Starring: Raj Deepak Sheety, Sheethal Shetty, Sharath Lohitashwa
- Cinematography: Shyam Sindanoor
- Music by: Raghav Subhash
- Distributed by: Mysore Talkies Release
- Release date: 27 November 2020
- Country: India
- Language: Kannada

Gadiyara is a 2020 Indian Kannada-language thriller film directed by Prabhik Mogaveer. The film featured Raj Deepak Shetty, Sheethal Shetty, Sharath Lohitashwa and Suchendra Prasad as lead characters. The music is composed by Raghav Subhash.

== Plot ==
Professor (Sharath Lohitashwa) who conspiracy to steal treasures hidden in various places during the time of the[kings. Police officer (Raj Deepak Shetty) chasing the case. Students who become police guests unconsciously. A professor is arrested by a police officer over a report by a journalist (Sheetal Shetty) that the students in the custody. However, the core of the report is not left to the directors alone.

== Cast ==
- Raj Deepak Shetty
- Sheethal Shetty
- Yash Shetty
- Sharath Lohitashwa
- Suchendra Prasad
- Sangliana
- Mandeep Rai
- Ganesh Rao
- Pranaya Murthy
- Radha Ramachandra
