= W. Chhuanawma =

Indian politician

Member of the Mizoram Legislative Assembly

W. Chhuanawma (born 3 January 1960) is an Indian politician from Mizoram. He is an MLA from the Tuichang Assembly constituency, which is reserved for Scheduled Tribe community, in Champhai district. He won the 2023 Mizoram Legislative Assembly election, representing the Zoram People's Movement.

== Early life and education ==
Chhuanawma is from Vaivakawn, Champhai District, Mizoram. He is the son of the late Rinawma. He married Lalmuanpuii and they have four children. He completed his Pre-University Course in 1982 at a college affiliated with North East Hill University.

== Career ==
Chhuanawma won the Tuichang Assembly constituency representing the Zoram People's Movement in the 2023 Mizoram Legislative Assembly election. He polled 9,117 votes and defeated his nearest rival, Tawnluia of the Mizo National Front, by a margin of 909 votes.
