= Hiphei =

Indian politician (1937–2020)

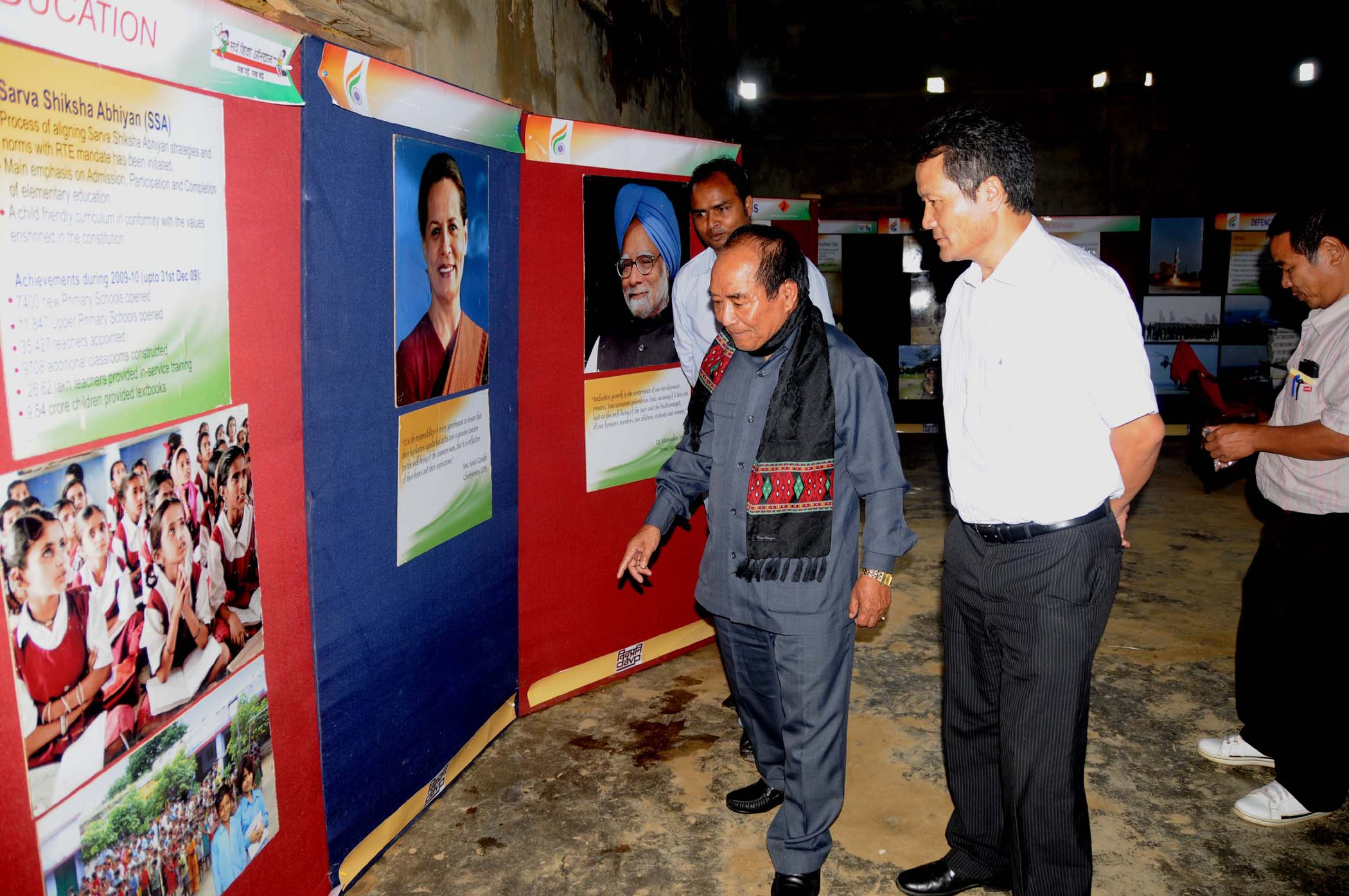

Member of the Rajya Sabha
- In office 1990–2002
- Preceded by: C. Silvera
- Succeeded by: Lalhming Liana
- Constituency: Mizoram (Rajya Sabha Constituency)

Personal details
- Born: 23 August 1937 Chapui Village, Saiha District, Mizoram
- Died: 8 April 2020 (aged 82) Aizawl
- Party: Bharatiya Janata Party
- Spouse: Sathlie
- Children: 2

Shri Hiphei (23 August 1937 – 8 April 2020) was an Indian politician from Mizoram.

== Political career ==
Hiphei began his political career with the Mara Freedom Party in September 1963. He was then elected to the state assembly from the Tuipang constituency as an independent in 1972 and was made deputy speaker.

Between 1972 and 2013, he won the Mizoram Assembly elections seven times; 1972, 1978, 1979, 1984, 1987, 1989 and 2013.

He joined the Janata Party in 1978 and then in 1984 switched his affiliation to the Indian National Congress.

He was elected to the upper house of India's Parliament, the Rajya Sabha, for two terms, from 1990 to 1996 and from 1996 to 2002, as a member of the Indian National Congress. He served as the Speaker of Mizoram Legislative Assembly from 1989 to 1990, and from 2013 until 5 November 2018, but resigned from the post and joined the Bharatiya Janata Party a few hours later.

== Death ==
Hiphei died in Aizawl on 8 April 2020 following a long illness. He was 82.

== See also ==
- List of Rajya Sabha members from Mizoram
