= Tuichang Assembly constituency =

Constituency of the Mizoram legislative assembly in India

Coordinates: 23.521°N 93.186°E

Tuichang
- Constituency No. 22 for the Mizoram Legislative Assembly
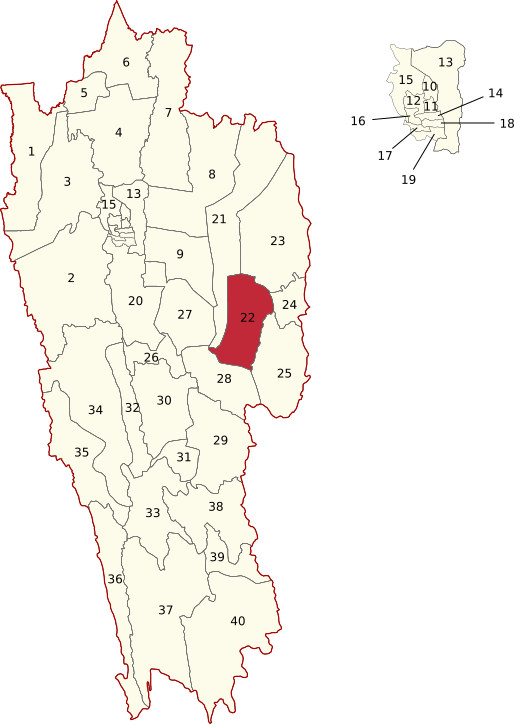

Constituency details
- Country: India
- Region: Northeast India
- State: Mizoram
- District: Champhai
- Lok Sabha constituency: Mizoram
- Established: 2008
- Total electors: 14,993
- Reservation: ST

Member of Legislative Assembly
- 9th Mizoram Legislative Assembly
- Incumbent W. Chhuanawma
- Party: Zoram People's Movement
- Elected year: 2023

Tuichang is one of the 40 Legislative Assembly constituencies of Mizoram state in India. It is part of Champhai district and is reserved for candidates belonging to the Scheduled Tribes.

== Members of the Legislative Assembly ==
Election	Name	Party
2008	Lalrinliana Sailo	Indian National Congress
2013	Lalrinliana Sailo	Indian National Congress
2018	Tawnluia	Mizo National Front
2023	W. Chhuanawma	Zoram People's Movement

== Election results ==
=== 2023 ===
2023 Mizoram Legislative Assembly election: Tuichang
Party	Candidate	Votes	%	±%
ZPM	W. Chhuanawma	6,988	47.03	
MNF	Tawnluia	6,079	40.91	
INC	C. Lalhriatpuia	1,674	11.27	
Independent	Lalhmunsiami	67	0.45	New
NOTA	None of the Above	50	0.34	
Majority		909	6.12	
Turnout		82.4		
ZPM gain from MNF		Swing		

=== 2018 ===
2018 Mizoram Legislative Assembly election: Tuichang
Party	Candidate	Votes	%	±%
MNF	Tawnluia			
NOTA	None of the Above			
Majority				
Turnout				
gain from		Swing		
