= Lalsawia =

Indian politician (1919–1999)

Member of Parliament, Rajya Sabha
- In office 17 June, 1976 – 16 June, 1984
- Constituency: Mizoram

Personal details
- Born: November, 1919 Lushai Hills, British India
- Died: 26 July, 1999 (aged 79)

Shri Lalsawia (November 1919 – 26 July 1999) was an Indian politician from Mizoram. He was the first Chief Executive Member (CEM) of Lushai Hills District, in the first general election of held in April 1952. He also served in the Upper House of the Indian Parliament – the Rajya Sabha – from 1978 to 1984 as an independent. He had one son and five daughters.

Lalsawia died on 26 July 1999 at the age of 79.

== See also ==
- List of Rajya Sabha members from Mizoram
