= C. Lalrosanga =

Indian politician

Member of Parliament for Mizoram
- In office 23 May 2019 – 4 June 2024
- Preceded by: C. L. Ruala
- Succeeded by: Richard Vanlalhmangaiha

Personal details
- Born: 1 March 1957 (age 69) Mizoram
- Party: Mizo National Front

C. Lalrosanga is an Indian politician from Mizoram and member of the Mizo National Front. He was a Member of Parliament of the 17th Lok Sabha, the lower house of the Indian Parliament, elected from the only seat of the Mizoram constituency. He won over Lalnghinglova Hmar, an independent candidate, and other candidates Nirupam Chakma of the BJP, T. B.C. Lalvenchhunga of the PRISM, and independent candidates — Lal Hriatrenga Chhangte and Lalthlamuani by getting a total vote 223,509 (44.99%).

== Personal life ==
Lalrosanga is a graduate of Pachhunga University College. He married Evelia L. Zadeng in 1976. They have 4 daughters and 1 son.

== Career ==
C. Lalrosanga joined All India Radio as news reader in 1975. After serving for eight years under the Indian Information Service, he joined Indian Broadcasting Programme Service (IBPS) in 1991 and retired as Director General of Doordarshan in 2015.
