= Lalbuaia =

Indian politician

Shri Lalbuaia is an Indian politician from Mizoram.

He was elected to the Rajya Sabha (the Upper House of the Parliament of India) from 1972 to 1978 from the Indian National Congress party.

== See also ==
- List of Rajya Sabha members from Mizoram
