= Richard Vanlalhmangaiha =

Indian politician

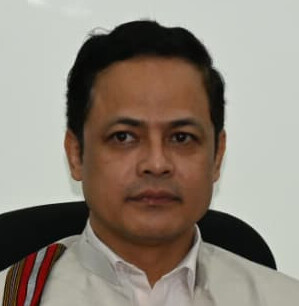

Member of Parliament, Lok Sabha
- Incumbent
- Assumed office 4 June 2024
- Preceded by: C. Lalrosanga
- Constituency: Mizoram

Personal details
- Born: August 3, 1978 (age 47) Aizawl, Mizoram, India
- Party: Zoram People's Movement
- Spouse: C Lalhmingmawii
- Children: 4
- Parent(s): Lalzawma, Zorengpuii

Richard Vanlalhmangaiha is an Indian politician from Mizoram. He is a member of the 18th Lok Sabha representing the Mizoram constituency in the state of the same name and the Zoram People's Movement (ZPM).

== Political career ==
In the 2024 general election, Vanlalhmangaiha ran for the Mizoram constituency as a member of the ZPM. He won that seat and was elected to the 18th Lok Sabha, having defeated five other candidates.
