= Lalrintluanga Sailo =

Indian politician (1960–2025)

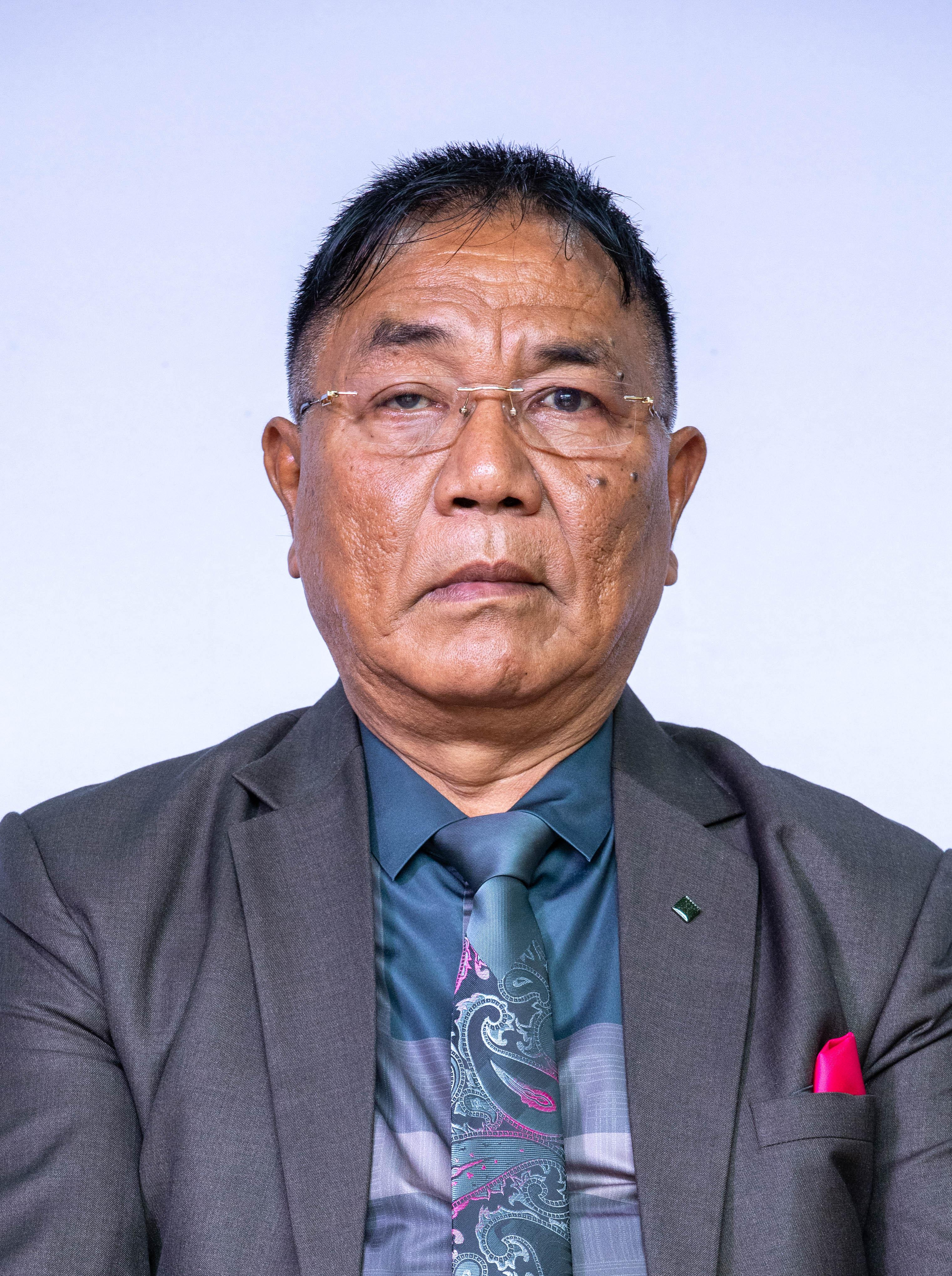

Member of the Mizoram Legislative Assembly for Dampa
- In office 2018 – 21 July 2025
- Preceded by: Lalrobika
- Succeeded by: R. Lalthangliana

Personal details
- Born: 13 June 1960 Aizawl, Assam, India (now Mizoram, India)
- Died: 21 July 2025 (aged 65) Delhi, India
- Party: Mizo National Front
- Education: Ch. Chhunga High School, Chawlhhmun, Aizawl

Lalrintluanga Sailo (13 June 1960 – 21 July 2025) was an Indian politician from Mizoram. He was a two–time member of the Mizoram Legislative Assembly from the Dampa Assembly constituency, which is reserved for the Scheduled Tribe community, in Mamit district. He was re-elected in the 2023 Mizoram Legislative Assembly election, representing the Mizo National Front.

== Early life and education ==
Sailo was born on 13 June 1960 in Aizawl, and resided at Luangmual, Aizawl District, Mizoram. He was the son of Lalnguauva Sailo. He married Lalbiakthuami and they had five children. He completed his Class 8 in 1975 at Ch. Chhunga High School, Chawlhhmun, Aizawl, Mizoram and later discontinued his studies.

He joined the underground movement during the Mizo National Front uprising at the age of 16. He returned to civilian life after the Mizoram Peace Accord was signed in 1986. Subsequently, he served as the personal driver of Pu Laldenga. He was elected to the Luangmual village council for four consecutive terms holding the office for 12 years. He had previously held various positions such as president and financial secretary in the Young Mizo Association, Luangmual branch. He was an executive member of the Mizoram Football Association for two terms.

== Career ==
Sailo won the Dampa Assembly constituency representing the Mizo National Front in the 2023 Mizoram Legislative Assembly election. He polled 6,218 votes and defeated his nearest rival, Vanlalsailova of the Zoram People's Movement, by a margin of 292 votes. He first became an MLA winning the 2018 Mizoram Legislative Assembly election, when he defeated his nearest rival, Lalrobiaka of the Indian National Congress, by a margin of 1,657 votes.

== Death ==
Sailo died of complicated ailments, including scrub typhus, at a private hospital in Delhi, on 21 July 2025. He was 65.
