= Lalhming Liana =

Indian politician (born 1955)

- In office 2002–2014

MP
- Preceded by: Hiphei
- Succeeded by: Ronald Sapa Tlau
- Constituency: Mizoram (Rajya Sabha Constituency)

Personal details
- Born: 11 November 1955 (age 70) Tualcheng Aizawl District, Mizoram
- Party: Mizo National Front
- Spouse: Vanlalnunpari
- Children: 3 sons
- As of 15 June, 2014

Shri Lalhming Liana, a politician from Mizo National Front party, was a Member of the Parliament of India representing Mizoram in the Rajya Sabha, the upper house of the Parliament.

== Education ==
He has completed his bachelor's in education at Government Aizawl College.

== Career ==
He was first elected to Rajya Sabha in 2002 and then again re-elected in 2008 during Mizo National Front Government in Mizoram. He has been involved in LTC scam and has been sentenced to 3 years imprisonment for forging air tickets to claim travel allowance.

== See also ==
- List of Rajya Sabha members from Mizoram
