= Dampa Assembly constituency =

Constituency of the Mizoram legislative assembly in India

Coordinates: 23.49°N 92.37°E

Dampa
- Constituency No. 2 for the Mizoram Legislative Assembly
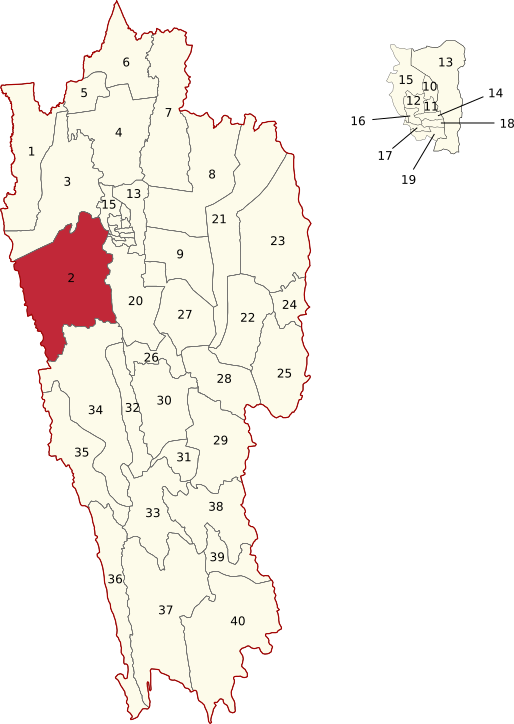

Constituency details
- Country: India
- Region: Northeast India
- State: Mizoram
- District: Mamit
- Lok Sabha constituency: Mizoram
- Established: 2008
- Total electors: 16,158
- Reservation: ST

Member of Legislative Assembly
- 9th Mizoram Legislative Assembly
- Incumbent R. Lalthangliana
- Party: MNF

Dampa Assembly constituency is one of the 40 Legislative Assembly constituencies of Mizoram state in India.

It is part of Mamit district and is reserved for candidates belonging to the Scheduled Tribes.

== Members of the Legislative Assembly ==
Year	Member	Party
2008	Lalrobiaka	Indian National Congress
2013	Lalrobiaka	Indian National Congress
2018	Lalrintluanga Sailo	Mizo National Front
2023	Lalrintluanga Sailo	Mizo National Front
2025^	R. Lalthangliana	Mizo National Front

^By election

== Election results ==
=== 2025 by-election ===
Mizoram Legislative Assembly by-election, 2025: Dampa
Party	Candidate	Votes	%	±%
MNF	R. Lalthangliana	6,981	40.05	▲4.4
ZPM	Vanlalsailova	6,419	36.83	▲2.86
INC	John Rotluangliana	2,394	13.73	▼4.31
BJP	Lalhmingthanga Sailo	1,541	8.84	▼2.97
NOTA	None of the Above	45	0.26	▲0.02
Majority		562	3.22	▲1.58
Turnout		17,351	83.07	▼4.05
MNF hold		Swing		

=== 2023 ===
2023 Mizoram Legislative Assembly election: Dampa
Party	Candidate	Votes	%	±%
MNF	Lalrintluanga Sailo	6,218	35.65	▼2.34
ZPM	Vanlalsailova	5,926	33.97	▲21.48
INC	Lalhmingthanga Sailo	3,146	18.04	▼9.17
BJP	Vanhlalmuaka	2,060	11.81	▼8.04
Independent	Lalramdingngheti	51	0.29	New
NOTA	None of the Above	42	0.24	▼0.26
Majority		292	1.68	▼9.15
Turnout		17,443	87.02	
MNF hold		Swing		

=== 2018 ===
2018 Mizoram Legislative Assembly election: Dampa
Party	Candidate	Votes	%	±%
MNF	Lalrintluanga Sailo	5,840	37.99	▲2.86
INC	Lalrobiaka	4183	27.21	▼16.06
BJP	Er. K. Lalrimawia	3051	19.85	▲19.00
ZPM	F. Lalrintluangi	1920	12.49	▼7.69
PRISM	Lalrinzuala Chawngthu	133	0.87	New
NPP	Lianzuala	106	0.69	New
Independent	Lalchhuvela	33	0.21	New
NCP	Lalawmpuia Chhangte	28	0.18	New
NOTA	None of the Above	77	0.50	▲0.28
Majority		1657	10.83	
Turnout		15,371	83.87	▼4.15
MNF gain from INC		Swing		

=== 2013 ===
2013 Mizoram Legislative Assembly election: Dampa
Party	Candidate	Votes	%	±%
INC	Lalrobiaka	6,172	43.27	▲2.15
MNF	Liansuama	5011	35.13	▼0.40
ZNP	Lalrimawia	2878	20.18	▲0.56
BJP	R. Laltawnliana	121	0.85	▼1.37
NOTA	None of the Above	81	0.57	New
Majority		1161	8.19	
Turnout		17315	88.02	▲1.02
INC hold		Swing		

=== 2008 ===
2008 Mizoram Legislative Assembly election: Dampa
Party	Candidate	Votes	%	±%
INC	Lalrobiaka	5,004	41.12	New
MNF	Lalrintluanga Sailo	4324	35.53	New
ZNP	Lalhmingthanga Sailo	2387	19.62	New
BJP	C. Hmingthansanga	270	2.22	New
LJP	Zakhuma	115	0.95	New
NCP	Lalawmpuia Chhangte	69	0.57	New
Majority		680	5.59	
Turnout		12169	87.0	
INC win (new seat)				
