= R. Rothuama =

Indian politician

R Roṭhuama
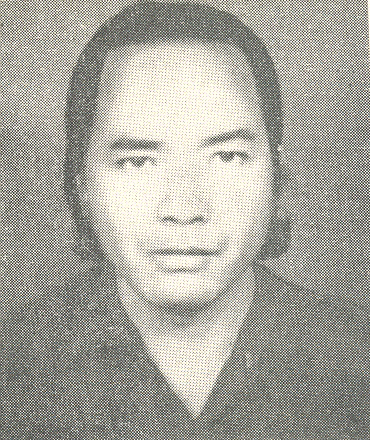
- R Roṭhuama

Member of Parliament for Mizoram
- In office 1977-1984
- Preceded by: Sangliana
- Succeeded by: Shri Lalduhoma
- Constituency: Mizoram

Personal details
- Born: 29 December 1940 Mizoram
- Died: 4 May 2013 (aged 73) NEIGRIHMS, Shillong, Meghalaya
- Spouse: Kaini Mao
- Children: Dr. Sarah Ralte
- Education: MBBS
- Alma mater: Assam Medical College, Dibrugarh
- As of 26 June, 2026

Dr. R Roṭhuama (29 December 1940 - 4 May 2013) was a politician from Mizoram who was a Member of the Parliament of India representing Mizoram in the 6th Lok Sabha and 7th Lok Sabha, the lower house of the Indian Parliament. He was initially a member of the Mizo People's Conference party but he later dissociated himself with the President of the Party Ṭhenphunga Sailo.

== Early life ==
Dr. Rothuama was born in Khawlek South to Hrangchhunga Ralte Siakeng and Hrangchhawni Chawngthu to be the fourth child among seven siblings.

He finished his primary school in Khawlek South. He studied middle school at Sialsuk. He finished his 6th standard in 1952, he was ranked second in Mizoram. In 1960, he passed his matriculation exam, he was ranked first in Mizoram. He finished his ISC at Guwahati Cotton College. He earned his MBBS degree at Dibrugarh Medical College in 1967.

== Career ==
In 1968, he began his medical profession at Shatribari Christian Hospital, Guwahati. After three years, he began working at Parkuguli Mission Hospital near the Bhutan border. From 1972, he began working at Meluri Civil Hospital, Nagaland as a Medical Officer. In September 1974, he returned to Mizoram and started private practice there.

In 1975, he joined the nascent Mizo People's Conference. In 1977, he was elected as an MP on the PC ticket. In 1980, he was elected on a ticket of a coalition known as Standing Committee Party.

== Personal life ==
Dr. Rothanga married Kaini Mao in Nagaland in April 1973. They had a son and a daughter.

He lived in different places due to his medical career, eventually staying in Delhi during his tenure as an MP. After his tenure, he continued living in Delhi owing to his children's education and his wife's work at the Nagaland Emporium. In 2011, the family settled in Shillong, as their daughter Dr. Sarah Ralte found work as an Assistant Professor in NEIGRIHMS.

He died due to liver cancer on 4 May 2013 at AIIMS, Delhi.

== See also ==
- A. Thanglura, fellow politician from Mizoram
