= R. Lalthangliana =

Indian politician

Dr. R. Lalthangliana
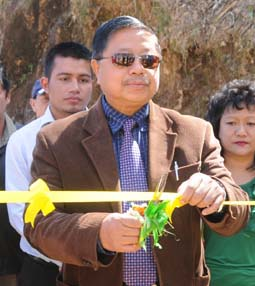

Member of Mizoram Legislative Assembly
- Incumbent
- Assumed office 14 November 2025
- Preceded by: Lalrintluanga Sailo
- Constituency: Dampa
- In office 2018–2023
- Preceded by: John Siamkunga
- Succeeded by: Jeje Lalpekhlua
- Constituency: South Tuipui

Personal details
- Born: 6 August 1956 (age 70) Lunglei, Mizoram, India
- Party: Mizo National Front
- Spouse: Ngurmawii
- Parent: R Dengchhunga (father)
- Education: North-Eastern Hill University

R. Lalthangliana is a Mizo politician and academic in Mizoram, India. He is former Cabinet Minister in the Mizo National Front ministry and held the portfolios of Health, Higher & Technical Education and Commerce & Industries. He had been elected to the Mizoram Legislative Assembly from the South Tuipui constituency. He lost to Jeje Lalpekhlua in the 2023 MLA Election. He was elected in 2025 by-election from the Dampa Assembly constituency.

== Career ==
Dr. R. Lalthangliana started his career teaching in Pachhunga University College and was assistant professor before he was elected to the Mizoram Legislative Assembly. He has been elected to the Mizoram Legislative Assembly in 1989, 1993, 1998, 2003 and 2008. He was elected in a bypoll in 2025 also.

== Education ==
He completed his high school at Serkawn Christian School and completed his BA at St. Edmunds College in 1978 after which he completed his M.A. at NEHU in 1980 in Shillong after which he obtained his Ph.D. from North-Eastern Hill University in Sociology.
