= South Tuipui Assembly constituency =

Constituency of the Mizoram legislative assembly in India

Coordinates: 23.052°N 92.944°E

South Tuipui
- Constituency No. 29 for the Mizoram Legislative Assembly
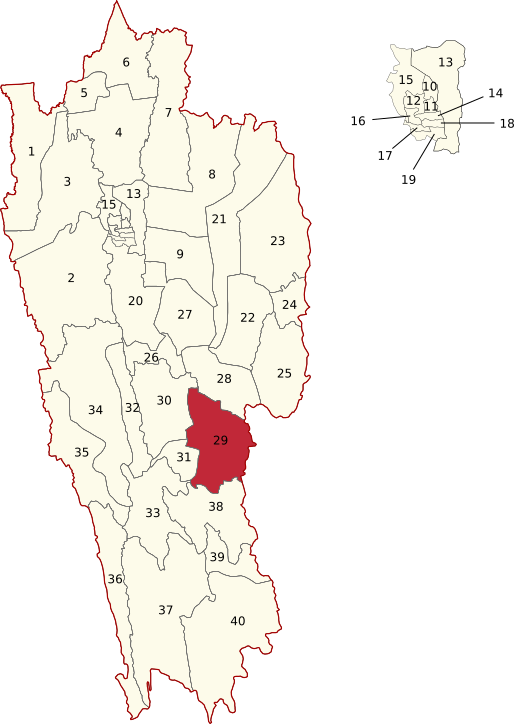

Constituency details
- Country: India
- Region: Northeast India
- State: Mizoram
- District: Lunglei
- Lok Sabha constituency: Mizoram
- Established: 2008
- Total electors: 16,348
- Reservation: ST

Member of Legislative Assembly
- 9th Mizoram Legislative Assembly
- Incumbent Jeje Lalpekhlua
- Party: Zoram People's Movement
- Elected year: 2023

South Tuipui is one of the 40 Legislative Assembly constituencies of Mizoram state in India.

It is part of Lunglei district and is reserved for candidates belonging to the Scheduled Tribes. As of 2023, it is represented by Jeje Lalpekhlua of the Zoram People's Movement party.

== Members of the Legislative Assembly ==
| Year | Name | Party |
|---|---|---|
| 2008 | Lalthanhawla | Indian National Congress |
| 2013 | John Siamkunga | Indian National Congress |
| 2018 | R. Lalthangliana | Mizo National Front |
| 2023 | Jeje Lalpekhlua | Zoram People's Movement |

== Election results ==
=== 2023 ===
2023 Mizoram Legislative Assembly election: South Tuipui
| Party | Candidate | Votes | % | ±% |
|---|---|---|---|---|
| ZPM | Jeje Lalpekhlua | 5,468 | 39.74 | |
| MNF | R. Lalthangliana | 5,333 | 38.76 | |
| INC | C. Laldintluanga | 2,958 | 21.50 | |
| NOTA | None of the Above | 59 | | |
| Majority | | 133 | | |
| Turnout | | 13,759 | 42.1 | |
| ZPM gain from MNF | | Swing | | |

=== 2018 ===
2018 Mizoram Legislative Assembly election: South Tuipui
| Party | Candidate | Votes | % | ±% |
|---|---|---|---|---|
| MNF | R. Lalthangliana | 6,126 | 49.83 | |
| INC | John Siamkunga | 4,657 | 37.88 | |
| Independent | Phairothanga | 1,359 | 11.06 | |
| BJP | Lalnunpuia | 151 | 1.23 | |
| NOTA | None of the Above | 35 | | |
| Majority | | 1,469 | | |
| Turnout | | 12,293 | 85.5 | |
| MNF gain from INC | | Swing | | |

=== 2013 ===
2013 Mizoram Legislative Assembly election: South Tuipui
| Party | Candidate | Votes | % | ±% |
|---|---|---|---|---|
| INC | John Siamkunga | 4,912 | 42.62 | |
| ZNP | J. Lalchhuana | 3,344 | 29.01 | |
| MNF | Z. H. Ropuia | 3,217 | 27.91 | |
| BJP | P. C. Remthanga | 53 | 0.46 | |
| NOTA | None of the Above | 49 | | |
| Majority | | 1,568 | | |
| Turnout | | 11,526 | 84.7 | |
| INC hold | | Swing | | |

=== 2008 ===
2008 Mizoram Legislative Assembly election: South Tuipui
| Party | Candidate | Votes | % | ±% |
|---|---|---|---|---|
| INC | Lalthanhawla | 3,772 | 35.45 | |
| ZNP | J. Lalchhuanua | 3,676 | 34.55 | |
| MNF | F. Lalthanzuala | 2,760 | 25.94 | |
| Independent | L. Remlala Fanai | 387 | 3.64 | |
| LJP | Lalramliana Ralte | 44 | 0.41 | |
| Majority | | 96 | | |
| Turnout | | 13,759 | 42.1 | |
| INC win (new seat) | | | | |

== See also ==
- Lunglei district
- List of constituencies of the Mizoram Legislative Assembly
