= Hrangturzo Assembly constituency =

Constituency of the Mizoram legislative assembly in India

Coordinates: 23.147°N 93.013°E

Hrangturzo
- Constituency No. 28 for the Mizoram Legislative Assembly
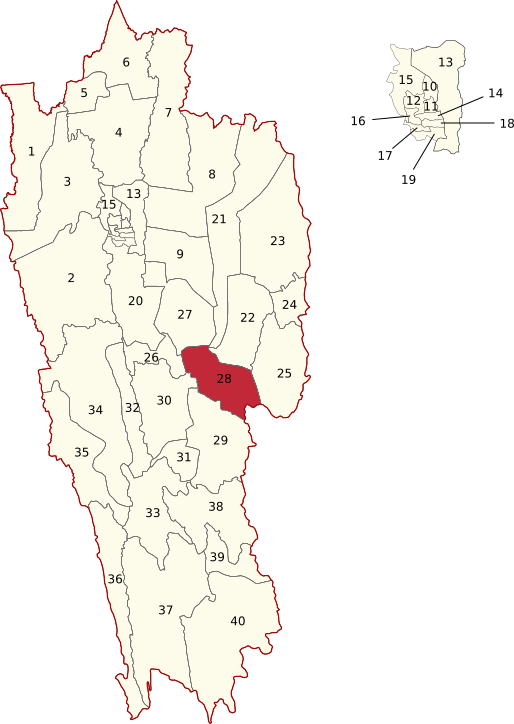

Constituency details
- Country: India
- Region: Northeast India
- State: Mizoram
- District: Serchhip
- Lok Sabha constituency: Mizoram
- Established: 2008
- Total electors: 14,710
- Reservation: ST

Member of Legislative Assembly
- 9th Mizoram Legislative Assembly
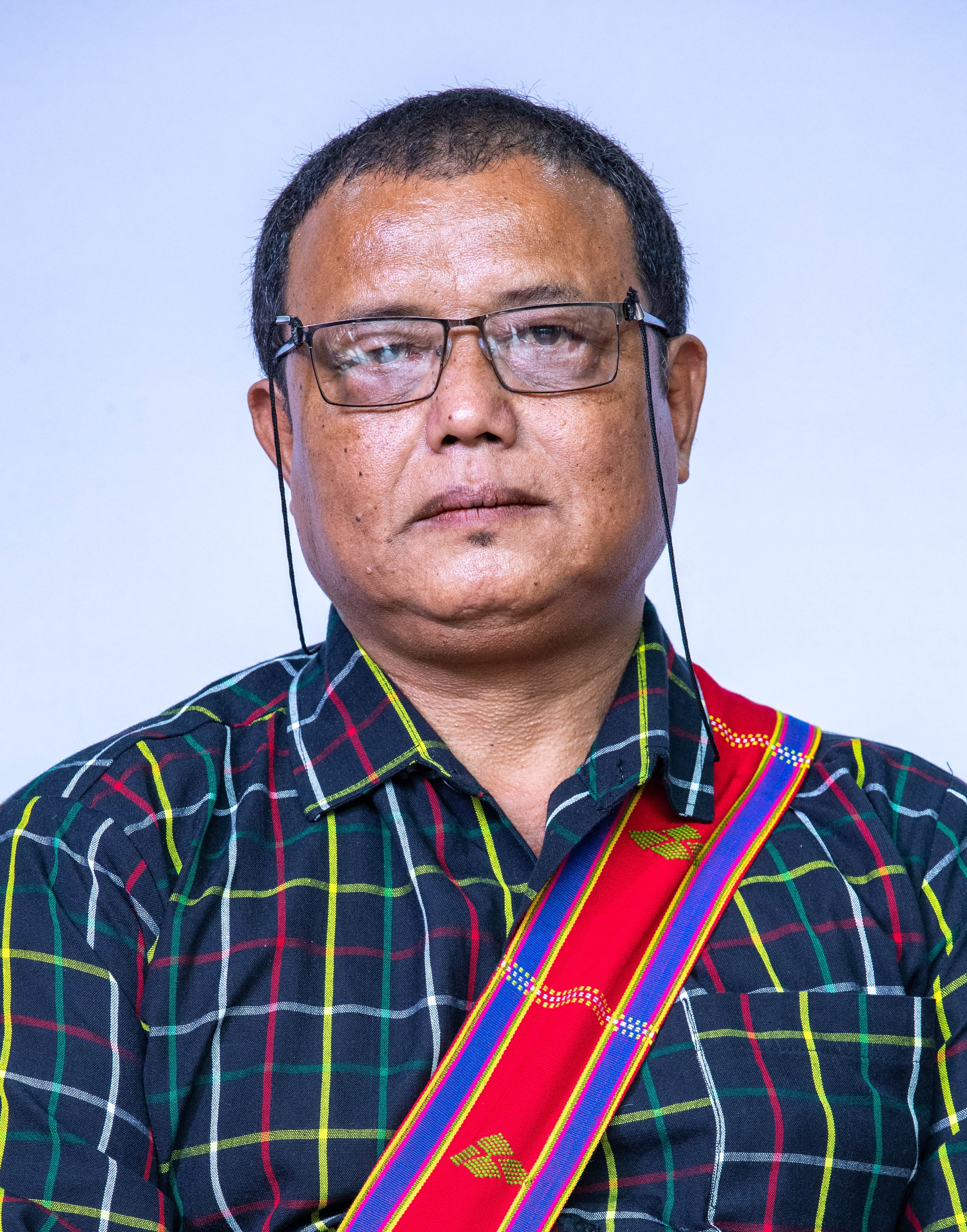
- Incumbent Lalmuanpuia Punte
- Party: ZPM
- Elected year: 2023

Hrangturzo is one of the 40 Legislative Assembly constituencies of Mizoram state in India.

It is part of Serchhip district and is reserved for candidates belonging to the Scheduled Tribes.

== Members of the Legislative Assembly ==
Year	Name	Party
2008	Lalthansanga	Mizoram People's Conference
2013	Lal Thanhawla (resigned)	Indian National Congress
2018	Lalchamliana	Mizo National Front
2023	Lalmuanpuia Punte	Zoram People's Movement

== Election results ==
=== 2023 ===
2023 Mizoram Legislative Assembly election: Hrangturzo
Party	Candidate	Votes	%	±%
ZPM	Lalmuanpuia Punte	6,280	44.92	
MNF	Lalremruata Chhangte	5,025	35.94	
INC	F. Lalroenga	2,340	16.74	
BJP	Lalmalsawma			
NOTA	None of the Above	37	0.26	
Majority				
Turnout		13,981	83.32	
ZPM gain from MNF		Swing		

=== 2018 ===
2018 Mizoram Legislative Assembly election: Hrangturzo
Party	Candidate	Votes	%	±%
MNF	Lalchamliana			
NOTA	None of the Above			
Majority				
Turnout				
gain from		Swing		
