= R. Lalthantluanga =

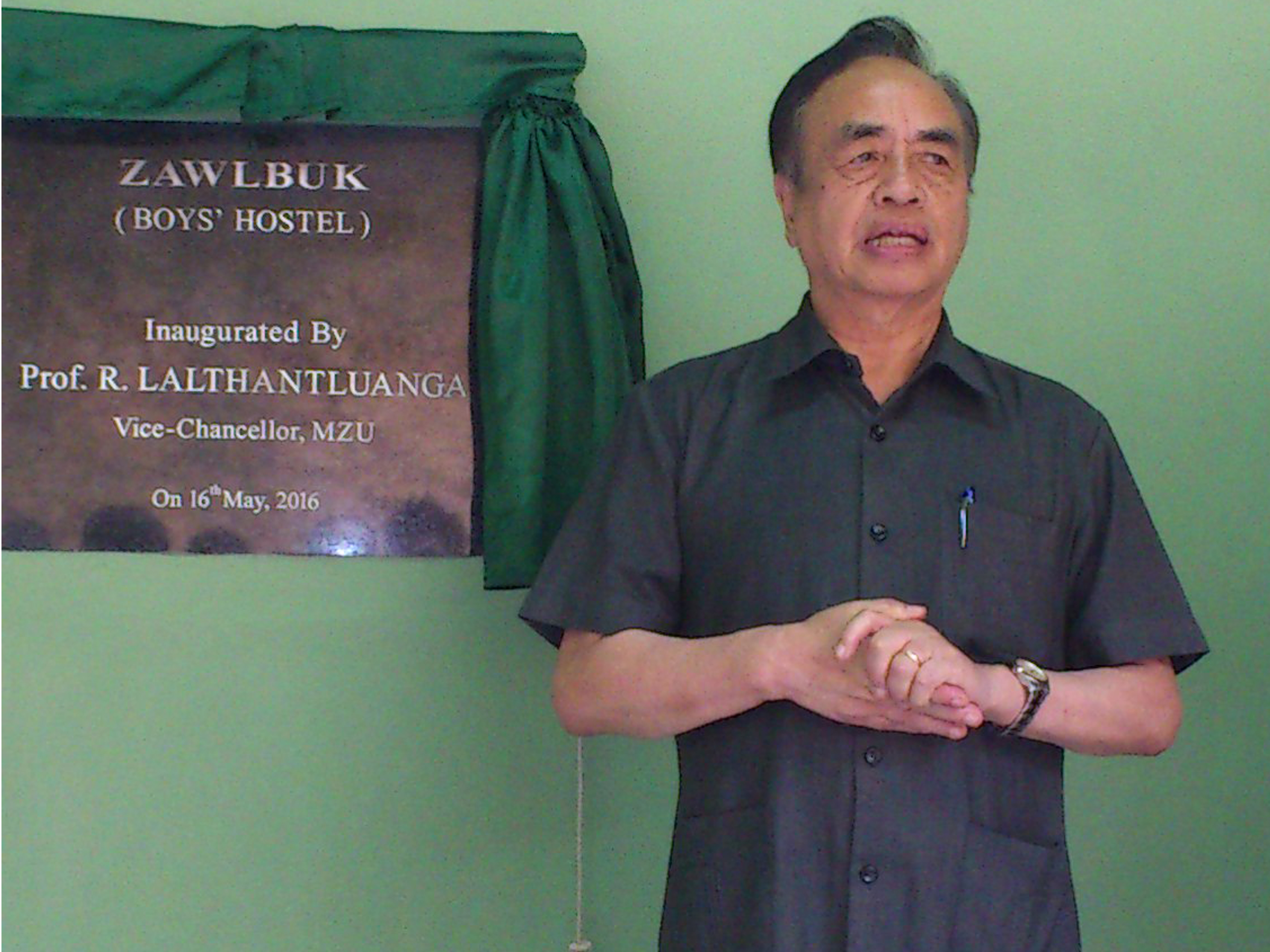
- R. Lalthantluanga inaugurates Zawlbuk, a boys' hostel at Pachhunga University College on 16 May 2016

3rd Vice chancellor of Mizoram University
- In office 19 May 2011 – 18 May 2016
- Preceded by: A.N. Rai

Personal details
- Born: 1 March 1947 (age 79) North Serzawl, Mizoram
- Education: Pune University
- Profession: Professor

R. Lalthantluanga (born 1 March 1947) is a retired professor of biochemistry and the former vice chancellor of Mizoram University, India. He is the first Mizo to become vice chancellor of Indian universities, and he is the third vice chancellor of Mizoram University. He is the former head, professor and founding faculty of the Department of Biochemistry, Dean of School of Life Sciences, and pro-vice-chancellor of North Eastern Hill University.

== Early life and career ==
R. Lalthantluanga was born in North Serzawl in Mizoram, India. He completed his BSc (honours) from Guwahati University in 1966, and Master of Science in 1968 and PhD in 1973 from Pune University. He entered the faculty of Ahmednagar College in 1968, and then joined the Department of Zoology, North Eastern Hill University, in 1974. He became the founder of the Department of Biochemistry of NEHU in 1980 and became its first faculty as a reader. He became full professor in 1984. He had served as the Head of the department, Dean of School of Life Sciences, and also as the pro-vice-chancellor at the Mizoram Campus of NEHU from 1990 to 2001.

He has been an editor of Science Vision since 2009.

=== Vice chancellor of Mizoram University ===
In May 2011, R Lalthantluang was selected to succeed Prof AN Rai as the vice chancellor of Mizoram University, and became the first Mizo vice chancellor in India.

=== Research ===
R. Lalthantluanga started his research career on the study of haemoglobin of horses, cows and insects. He had contributed to a groundbreaking study on high-altitude adaptation among the Himalayan yak.

== Awards and honours ==
- Deutscher Akademischer Austausch Dienst (DAAD) Post Doctoral Fellowship
- Max Planck Society Post Doctoral Fellowship
- SaraswatiPutra the highest honour of International Council of CCLP Worldwide on 18 January 2012
