= Pachhunga University College =

Public institute in Mizoram, India

Coordinates: 23.7244°N 92.7251°E

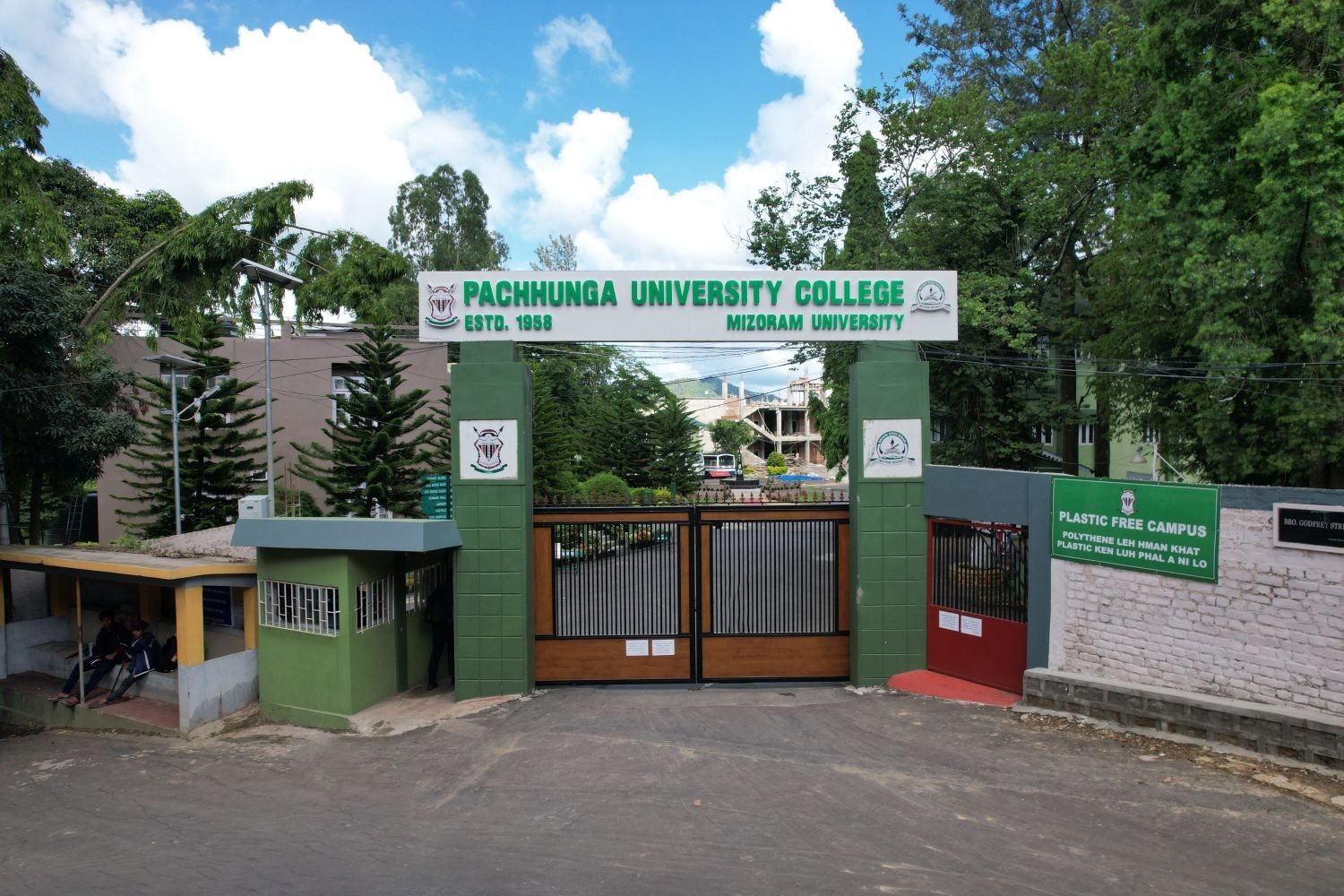
- Pachhunga University College Main Gate
- Motto: Learning and Service
- Type: Public
- Established: 15 August 1958; 68 years ago
- Affiliations: Mizoram University
- Principal: H. Lalthanzara
- Academic staff: 120
- Administrative staff: 98
- Students: 3027
- Undergraduates: 2918
- Postgraduates: 109
- Location: Aizawl, Mizoram, 796001, India
- Campus: 106.38 acres (43.05 ha); Urban
- Website: www.pucollege.edu.in

Pachhunga University College (PUC) is a public institute in Aizawl, Mizoram, and the only constituent college of Mizoram University, a central university established by an Act of Parliament of India. Founded in 1958 as Aijal College, it is the oldest and largest college in Mizoram, by enrolment and campus size. It started with intermediate of arts (equivalent of higher secondary education) courses, and later expanded to bachelor's degrees in arts, commerce and science. With the opening of master's degree courses in Mizo, Philosophy, and Life Sciences, it became the first postgraduate college in Mizoram.. In addition to these three PG courses, the college has also introduced master's degree courses in Geophysics (2020) and Applied Mathematics and Statistics (2022).

The college is named in honour of Pachhunga, a leading businessman and politician, who funded its initial management in 1962. It became a university college when the North Eastern Hill University incorporated it as its only constituent college in 1979. The permanent campus, occupied since 1965, is situated in College Veng, a locality at the eastern end of Aizawl. The 138-acre campus is the only verdant forest reserve in Aizawl, and is referred to as the "lung of the city." For its conservation of forests, it received the Indira Priyadarshini Vrikshamitra Awards in 1995, a national award for pioneering and innovative works in afforestation and wasteland management, from the Ministry of Environment, Forest and Climate Change, Government of India.

It received the Best College award from the Zoram Research Foundation, consecutively in 2004 and 2006. Between 2009 and 2013, the Department of Science and Technology of India awarded the college with a special scheme of Fund for Improvement of Science and Technology Infrastructure (FIST). In 2011, the Department of Biotechnology of India set up Institutional Biotech Hub, which was upgraded to Advanced Institutional Biotech Hub in 2017. The same year, DBT awarded its Star College Scheme. In 2017, the University Grants Commission made it College with Potential for Excellence. In 2021, the DBT awarded the college its first DBT-Boost to University Interdisciplinary Life Science Departments for Education and Research programme (DBT-BUILDER).

In 2023, the National Assessment and Accreditation Council classified it as "A^{+}" grade with a CGPA of 3.47. The National Institutional Ranking Framework placed it at 49th among colleges in India, the only college within the top 100 list, and thus, the highest rank from northeast India.

The college is ranked 35th among colleges in India by the National Institutional Ranking Framework (NIRF) in 2024.

== History ==
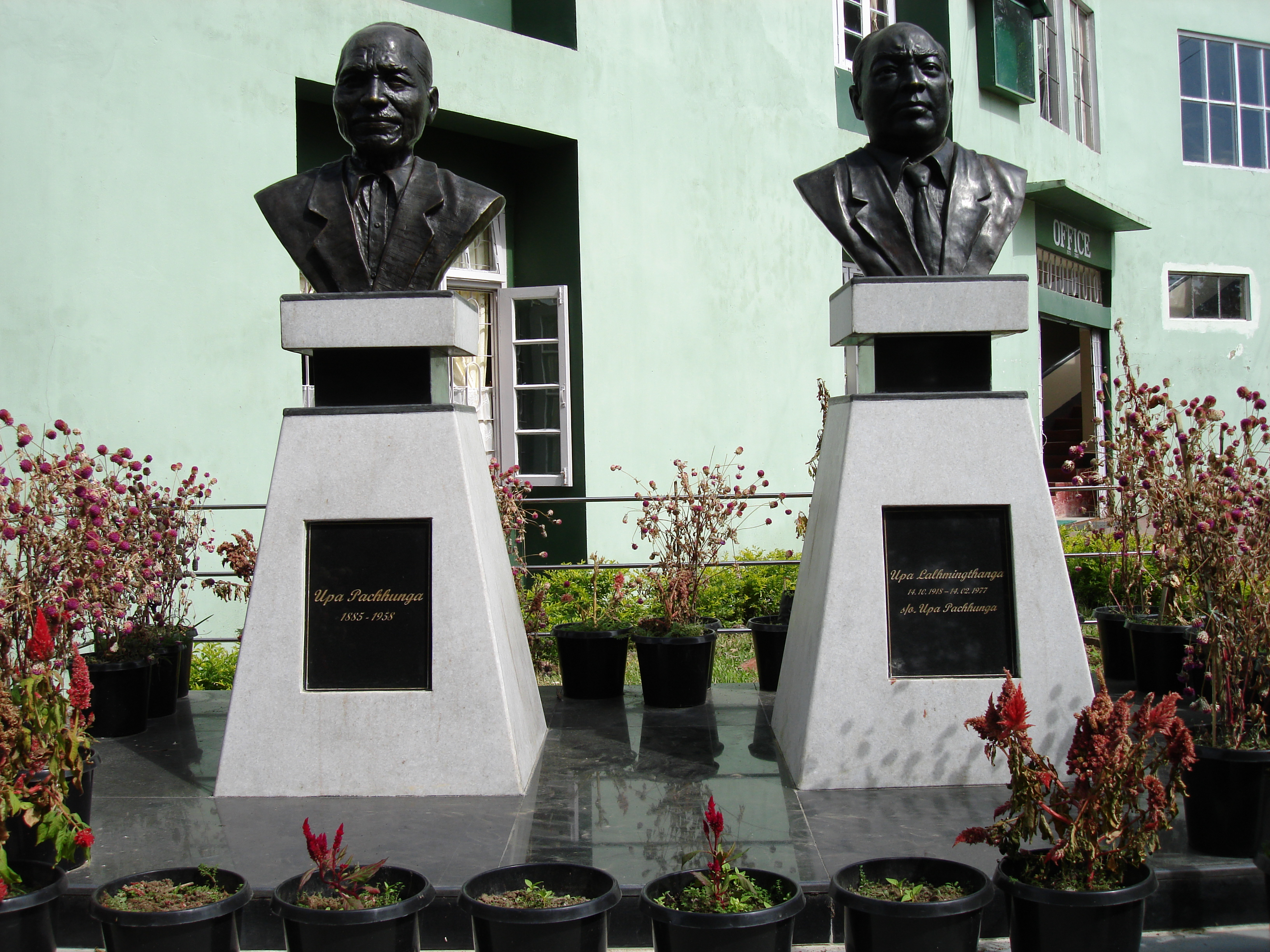
Busts of Pachhunga and his son Lalhmingthanga near the entrance of PUC.

After the independence of India from the British Empire in 1947, the Mizo people were governed under the Government of Assam as Lushai Hills district. By 1950s, many Mizo people had completed secondary education with no further opportunity. J. Malsawma made the first provocative petition for the establishment of college by writing an open letter titled "Vana Pa College" in MZP Magazine; but to no avail. He and H.K. Bawichhuaka set up what they called an "Organising Board" at Pachhunga's house in Dawrpui, Aizawl, in 1957. By then, a philanthropic entrepreneur Pachhunga, known as the "most prosperous Mizo businessman" or "the wealthiest man in Mizoram", was made chairman of the board. The board held a public meeting in June 1957 at the Boys’ Middle English School, wherein the public unanimously voted the Deputy Commissioner of Lushai Hills as chairman of the board. The Deputy Commissioner then was adamant. In April 1958, Lawrence Singh Ingty from Mikir Hills become the new Deputy Commissioner. Quick to action, Ingty created the first Organising Board under his chairmanship, with Bawichhuaka as the Secretary, Malsawma as the Joint Secretary, and Lalhmingthanga (Pachhunga's son) as the Treasurer. Raising funds from donations by those who applied for arms license, he inaugurated Aijal College on 15 August 1958 (Indian Independence Day) at Aijal Theatre Hall (now Vanapa Hall).

At the behest of Ingty, Brother Godfrey Danis, who at the time was headmaster of St. Paul's High School, became the first but temporary principal. The faculty were volunteers and originally comprised a team of Christian missionaries including John Meirion Lloyd, Helen Lowry, Gwen Rees Roberts (Pi Teii) and Father O'Brien, along with educated natives such as Rita Neihpuii, Sangliana, and Malsawma. Classes officially started on 1 September 1958. Initially, classes were conducted at the Theatre Hall itself in the afternoon (which they called Evening Class). Towards the end of 1961, the college moved to an abandoned warehouse at Children's Park. For financial support, Ingty would ask for donation from people applying for arms license. Upon the request of the Organising Board, the Welsh Mission Board (Foreign Mission of the Presbyterian Church of Wales) appointed Rev. Alwyn Roberts as the first regular Principal in November 1960. In 1961, the college became government aided, and received affiliation from Gauhati University.

In 1962, the college was renamed Pachhunga Memorial College (PMC) after the death of Pachhunga, as his son, Lalhmingthanga donated INR 10,000 to the college on his father's behalf. It was relocated to its permanent campus in June 1965. On 1 July 1965, the Assam Government declared provincialisation (official recognition), and the name was once more changed to Pachhunga Memorial Government College (PMGC). Permanent teachers were appointed only in 1967 under the Assam Public Service Commission. The University Grants Commission granted full recognition in 1969.

When Lushai Hills became a separate Union Territory as Mizoram from Assam in 1972, the management of the college was handed over to the Government of Mizoram. The college was renamed Pachhunga Government College in 1977. The affiliation was transferred to a newly established North Eastern Hill University (NEHU), on 19 April 1979. NEHU incorporated the college administration to its own and made it its only constituent college with a vision to promote it as a "pace-setting institution." Then it was renamed Pachhunga University College (PUC). With the setting up of Mizoram University on 2 July 2001, the authority was once again signed over to the new university; and remain as such ever since.

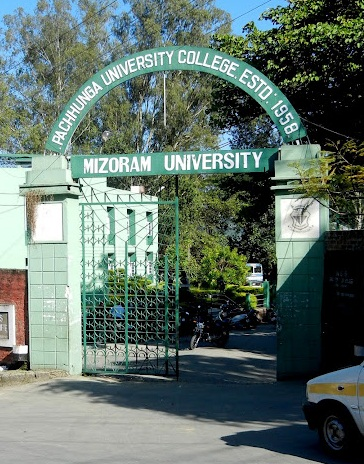
PUC main gate before renovation.

== Courses ==
=== Development ===
For a start, the degree consisted of only Intermediate of Arts (I.A.; modern equivalent of higher secondary) with five subjects such as English, Civics, Geography, History and Logic. New courses on basic science were instituted in 1973. The faculty of commerce was introduced in 1984, and with this, the college was, and remains, the only institute in Mizoram to offer the three different disciplines. Department of Public Administration was initiated in 2005. From 2012 two new departments such as Biotechnology and Environmental Science were started. In 2018, Bachelor of Business Administration, postgraduate courses in arts and science were started. All courses are conducted with choice-based credit system.

=== Bachelor's degree course ===
As of 2022, there are 11 bachelor's degree courses in arts and humanities: English, Economics, Education, Geography, History, Mizo, Philosophy, Political Science, Psychology, Public Administration and Sociology).

There are 9 courses in science: Biotechnology, Botany, Chemistry, Environmental Science, Geology, Mathematics, Physics, Statistics and Zoology.

There are one course each in Commerce and BBA.

=== Master's degree courses ===
As of 2022, there are five postgraduate courses: Applied Mathematics and Statistics (M.Sc.), Geophysics (M.Sc.), Life Sciences (M.Sc.), Mizo (M.A.), and Philosophy (M.A.).

=== Ph.D. course ===
A Ph.D. programme is available in the Department of Life Sciences since 2020.

=== Additional courses ===
PUC is the Study Centre 1923 under IGNOU. Started in 2008, the centre offers certificate courses such as in Environmental Studies, Laboratory Techniques, Higher Education, and HIV and Family Education, along with bachelor's degrees in arts and science.

UGC add-on and skill development courses have been introduced including Certificate Course in Pisciculture (2009-2013) and Certificate Course in Human Rights (since 2013). PUC also received UGC Community College Scheme in 2015 from which Diploma in Mushroom Cultivation course is offered. The college also conducts a self-financing Finishing School for graduating students. Coaching Class for Entry into Civil Services are conducted during winter sessions.

Two UGC-funded courses, Mizo Cultural Studies and Performing Arts, and Human Rights, were introduced in 2018.

== Faculty ==
There are 99 permanent teachers, including the principal. 60.57% of them possess PhD and 12% MPhil in their respective fields. There are 4 Professors, 23 Associate Professors, and 80 Assistant Professors. There are 71 supporting staff including Assistant Registrar, Section Officer, clerks, peons, drivers and cleaners. There are 25 technical staff including laboratory assistants, mechanic, electrician and carpenters.

As the UGC introduced a new provision for college teachers to become full professors in 2010, J.V. Hluna became the first professor in colleges in Mizoram.

== Students ==
Average number of enrollment of students is 2,200 for the past five years, with approximately 850 fresh admission every year. Admission is done through online portal and selection is based on merit in the last board/university examination. Minimum mark required for application to any course is 50% of the total marks in the last examination. More than 95% belong to minority and Scheduled Tribe category. The average annual gender ratio of male to female is 1.1:1.

The college has official organisations for students such as Students' Union, National Service Scheme, National Cadet Corps, and Red Ribbon Club. It offers "Earn While Learn" scheme for students from low-income family to earn their educational expenses. Other independent co-curricular bodies include Cultural Club, Eco Club, Adventure Club, Literature Club, and Chess Club.

=== Awards for students ===
The college and its alumni provide proficiency awards such as H.K. Bawichhuaka Proficiency Award for BA students, Lenrual Hlui Science Proficiency Award for BSc students, and Khawtinkhuma Proficiency Award for BCom students who secured highest marks in the final university examinations. There are sponsored awards such as ZET Award from Zoram Educational Trust (ZET) for meritorious students in physics, and SEL Foundation Award from Sunflower Electronics Foundation for students in physics, mathematics and chemistry.

=== NSS ===
PUC Unit of NSS was established in 1972. It organises community works and social services regularly. Annual programme includes Green Mizoram Day, Cleanliness Drive, and Mass Blood Donation. PUC Unit has won Indira Gandhi NSS Awards two times, in 1994–1995 and in 2015–2016. In the 2015–2016 Indira Gandhi NSS Awards, Zoramdinthara received the Programme Officer Award, and Chawnghlunchhungi received the Volunteers Award. It organises blood donation camps for which the college had been the record holder under the Government of Mizoram as the most blood donor since 1998.

== Campus and infrastructure ==
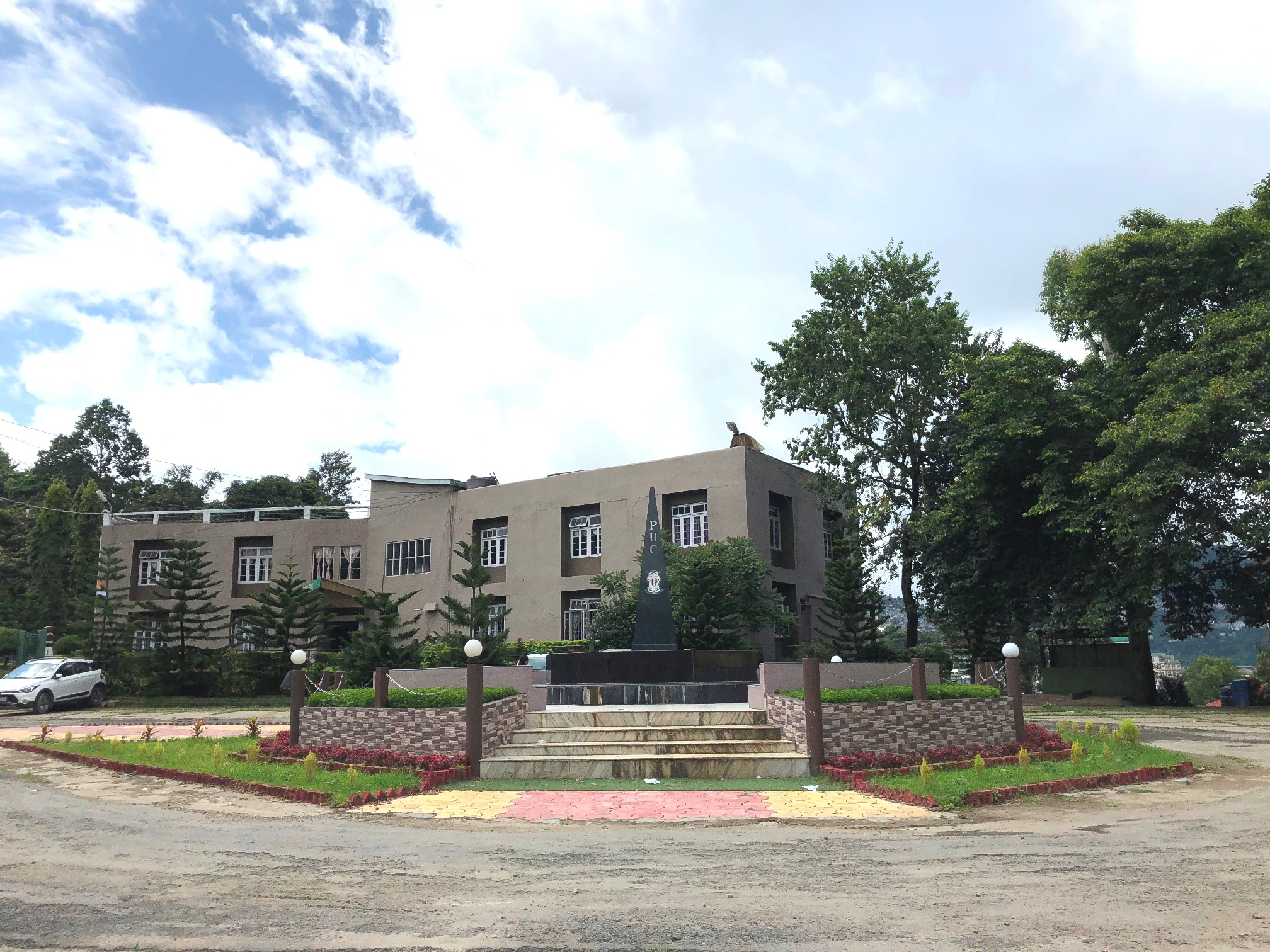
Administrative Building.

PUC campus is situated at the eastern side of Aizawl, and covers 138 acres of land. As the only verdant forest reserve within the capital city of Mizoram, Chief Minister Lal Thanhawla once remarked it as the "lung of the city." There are five academic buildings, one central library, seven staff quarters, health clinic, counseling centre, NSS/Students' Union Office, power generator room, ring well, basketball court, volleyball court, and seismological observatory. In addition to classrooms and departmental rooms, Academic Block 1 consists of Student's Recreation Centre and Internet Resource Centre. Academic Block 2 consists of a workshop/maintenance cell. The basement of Academic Block 3 is Language Lab. Science Building consists of IGNOU Centre 1923. Seminar Hall lies adjacent to Science Building and Life Science Building, and the basement is a cafeteria. Research and Instrumentation Centre, Zoological Museum, and Advanced Biotech Hub are at located within Life Science Building.

The administrative building consists of Principal's chamber, establishment cell, finance cell, faculty common room and departmental offices. Multipurpose Auditorium is located at the entrance of the playground. It consists of badminton court. The playground is standard football pitch size, surrounded by concrete pavilion. There are two girls' hostels each having 190 capacity, and two boys' hostel, each with 178 boarders. A free-access Internet Resource Centre, the first of its kind in Mizoram, was established under NER FIST of the Department of Science and Technology. All offices and departmental rooms are linked with internet connectivity through broadband service. All classrooms and laboratories are furnished with fixed LCD projection system since 2012.

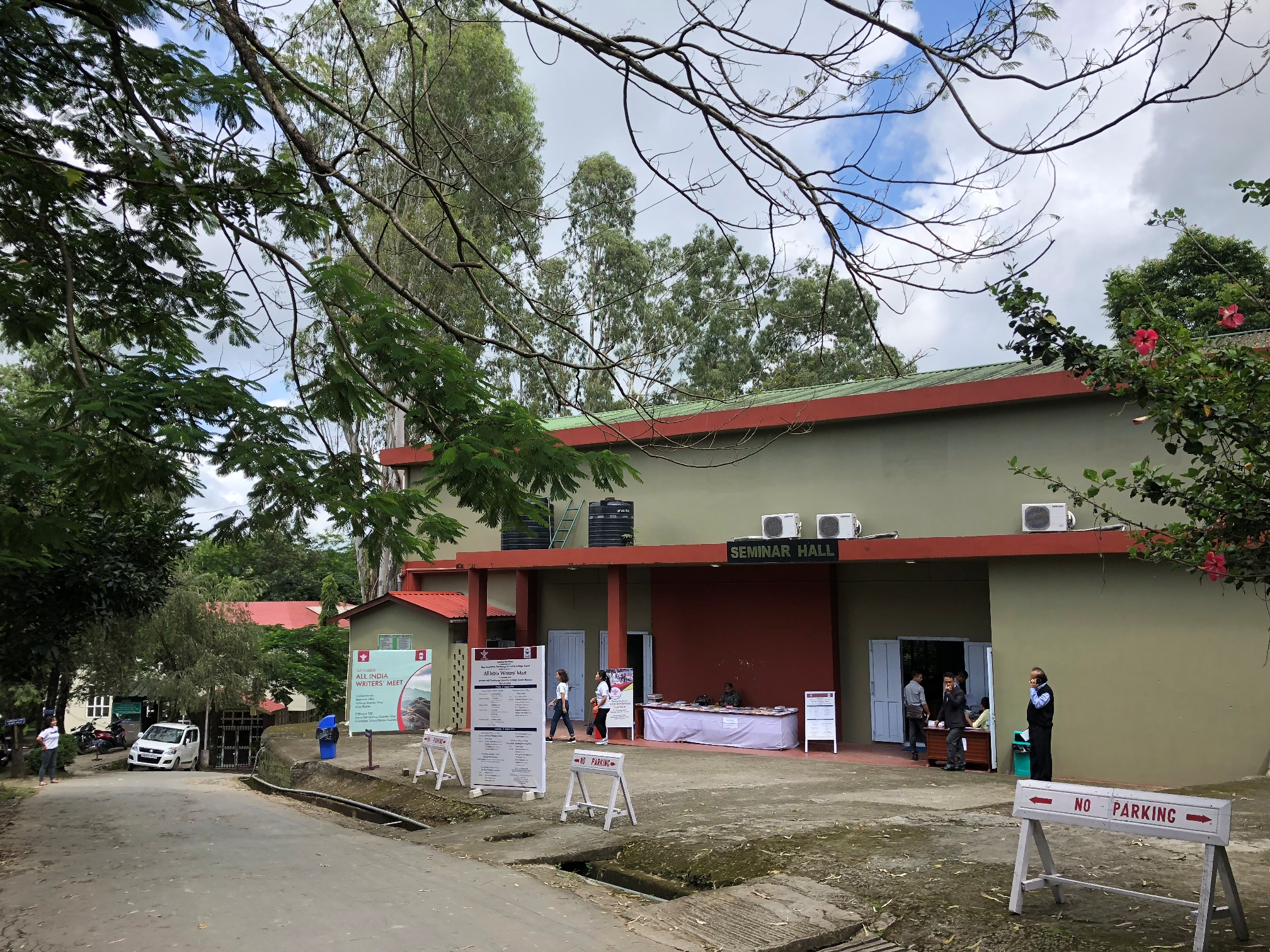
Seminar Hall and library behind (left).

=== Library ===
The college library was set up as a separate department in 1960. By the end of the 1970s, it had the best collection of books in northeast India. In the midst of the political and social agitation in Mizoram (the Mizo National Front uprising), the original library, along with five high schools in Aizawl, was completely burnt down on 4 November 1981. Over 25,000 collections were lost. The second library was built in 1984 as an immediate replacement.

The third and permanent library was inaugurated by the then Vice Chancellor R. Lalthantluanga in 2013. It has now collected more than 42,803 general books, 34,242 textbooks, 8,561 reference books, 29 academic journals, and a number of magazines and newspapers available. Reprography and internet access are also available. Library automation system has been introduced, and is using INFLIBNET. Since 2020, it uses RFID Management System provided by Rapid Radio through which fully-functional self-servicing digital platforms are available.

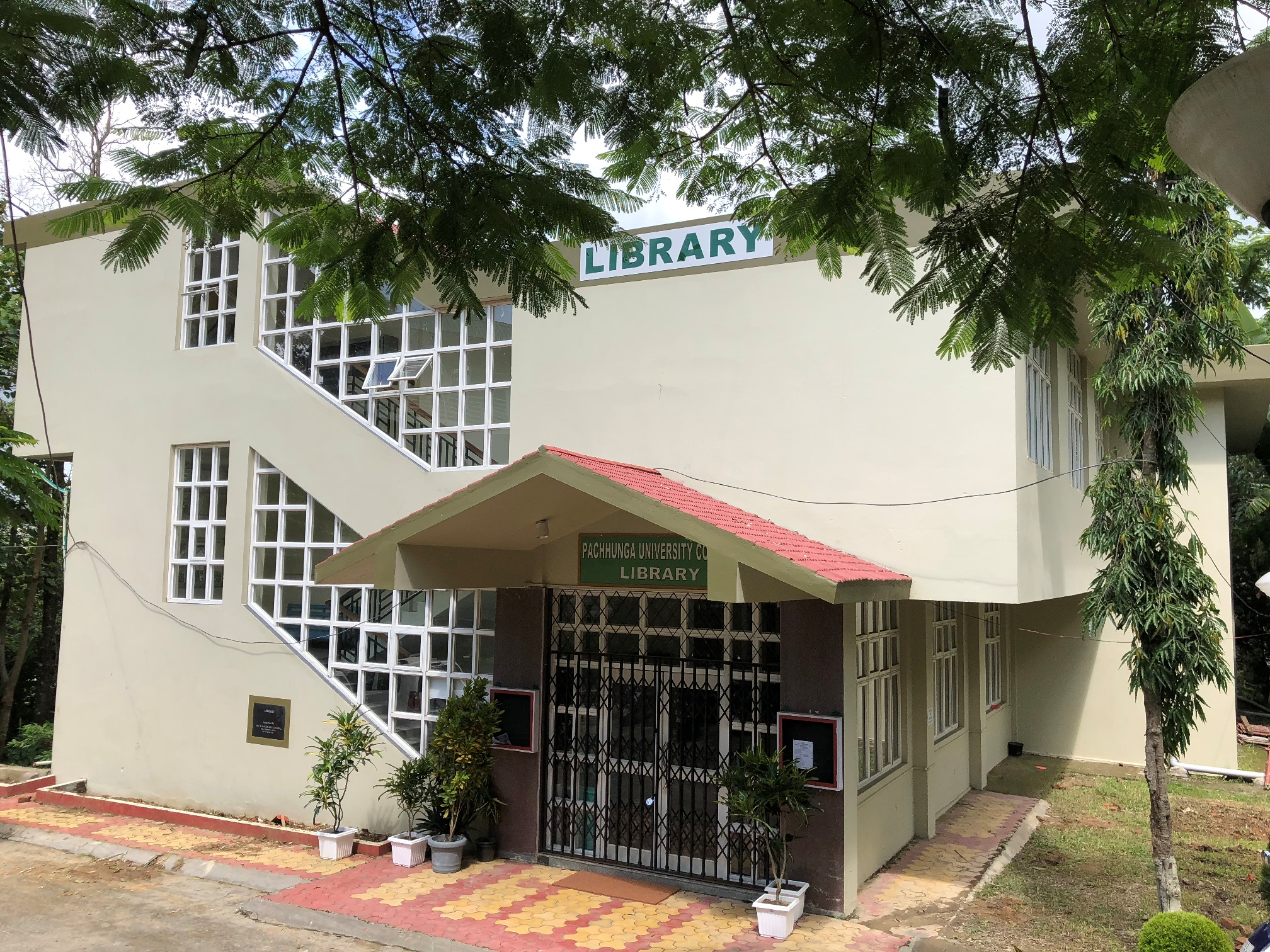
Library.

=== Laboratories ===
All science departments, Geography and Psychology have separate laboratories. The laboratories are adequately provided with state-of-the-art equipment for practical classes. Sophisticated instruments are also available for research activities. Laboratories are further maintained through NER FIST of the Department of Science and Technology. Departments of Botany, Chemistry and Zoology are further supported by the Star College Scheme of the Department of Biotechnology, Government of India, since 2012.

=== Research centre ===
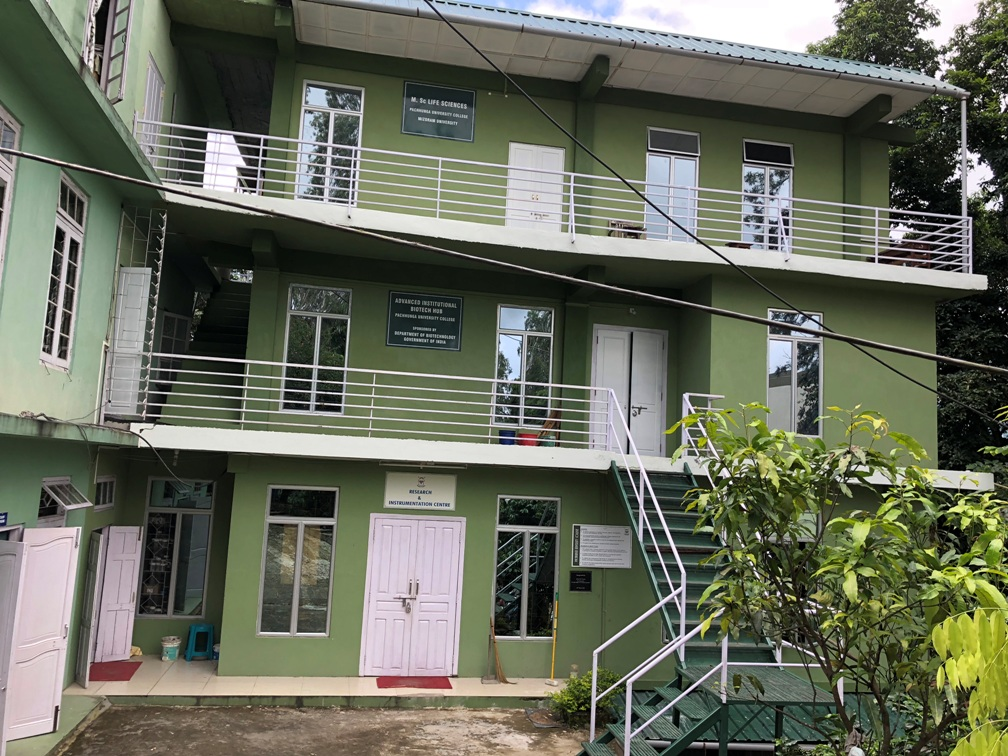
Research Centre (ground floor), Biotech Hub (first floor), and Life Sciences classroom (second floor).

There is a Research and Instrumentation Centre at the Zoology Department in which research projects are carried out. It also houses the Advanced Institutional Biotech Hub.

== Research ==
The institution receives research grants from various funding agencies. There have been 23 research projects from UGC, out of which 21 are minor research projects and 2 are major research projects. There are two major research projects in Zoology Department from the Department of Biotechnology. The Department of Science and Technology has given four major research projects and two Women Scientist schemes. Under the Advanced Institutional Biotech Hub, a separate research is conducted. The same year, DBT awarded its Star College Scheme.

Mizoram Government (Horticulture Department) had sponsored "Zo Huan". The Department of Environment, Forest and Climate Change also had funded research projects on fish diversity and campus conservation. Zoram Educational Trust (ZET) also offers a minor research scheme. In 2021, the DBT awarded the Department of Life Sciences its first DBT-Boost to University Interdisciplinary Life Science Departments for Education and Research programme (DBT-BUILDER).

== Accreditation and ranking ==
=== NAAC ===
PUC had its first NAAC assessment in 2011, and received grade B with CGPA of 2.78. It was the second highest grade among institutions in Mizoram. In the next cycle in 2016, it was graded A^{+} with CGPA of 3.51, becoming the highest graded institution in the state. The third cycle of NAAC assessment in 2022 gave A^{+} grade with a CGPA of 3.37, the highest score in northeast India.

=== NIRF ===
College rankings

General – India
- NIRF (Colleges) (2023): 34

In 2018, the National Institutional Ranking Framework listed PUC for the first time and included it among the best 150 colleges in India (rank band within 101–150). At 132, the college ranked highest among colleges in northeast India. In 2021, it was ranked again in the 151–200 band among colleges. In 2023, it ranked at 34th becoming the only college within the top 100 list from northeast India, and thus, the highest ranked college from the region.

=== ISO ===
On 23 July 2018, PUC received its first certification of the International Organization for Standardization (ISO) from HYM International Certifications Pvt. Ltd. It is certified for ISO 9001:2015 (Quality Management) leh ISO 14001:2015 (Environmental Management).

=== India Today ranking ===
In 2022, the India Today ranking, published by the Living Media, for "India's Best Colleges" listed the college as the "Best College for Arts and Science" in northeast India. The college was given an all-India rankings of 141st in arts, 167th in science and 183rd in commerce subjects.

== Community services ==
=== Blood donation ===
PUC is an all-time record holder in Mizoram as the top blood donor from an institution. This service has been officially recognised and awarded by the Department of Health and Family Welfare of the Government of Mizoram. Since 1994, the college had developed mass blood donation programme as an annual event, mostly in commemoration of the establishment day. It made the first record in 1998 as most number of blood units donated in a day, with 333 volunteers donating their blood. In 2011, it broke its own record with 425 units donated in a day.

In 2013, with support from the Mizoram State AIDS Control Society (MSACS) and the Association for Voluntary Blood Donation (AVBD), the college held a "Blood Donors Festival," the largest blood donation event up to the time. It also won first prize under the category of educational institution jointly awarded by MSACS and AVBD at the World Blood Donor Day on 14 June 2018.

=== Village adoption ===
PUC introduced a policy for promoting the social and educational development of small villages in Mizoram in 2012. The former President of India Pranab Mukherjee had endorsed the policy and advised other institutions to follow suit. The villages adopted are:

- Phulpui (2012–2013)
- Lungleng (2016–2018)
- Dulte (2019–2020)
- Khawrihnim (2021–2022)

== Notable alumni ==
Pachhunga University College Alumni Association (PUCAA) was established in 2007, with P.L. Liandinga as its first president.

Notable alumni of the university include:

- C. Lalrosanga, former Director General of Doordarshan, Member of Parliament of the 17th Lok Sabha from 2019-2024.
- Chuauthuama, Mizo minister theologian, writer, biblical scholar and translator.
- K. Vanlalvena, politician, former president of the Mizo Zirlai Pawl and Member of Parliament in the Rajya Sabha since 2020.
- Laltluangliana Khiangte, Mizo literary scholar and professor at Mizoram University, who had served as the Principal of Serampore College and professor at NEHU.
- Lal Thanhawla, former Chief Minister of Mizoram.
- Vanlalzawma, politician and former president of the Young Mizo Association (YMA), and Member of Parliament in the 13th Lok Sabha and 14th Lok Sabha.

== Cultural Day and Laisuih Award ==
PUC organises a Cultural Day every three years since 2011. On 14 November 2011, the Principal Tawnenga launched it as a commemoration of cultural harmony and as promotion of ethnic awareness among the students and employees. At the event, all staff and students dress up in their own ethnic costumes. Part of the programme, Laisuih Award is given to an individual who has made influential contribution to Mizo literature, particularly through music.

- The first award was given to V. Thangzama, a traditional musician and composer.
- In 2015, the award went to singer Lalnunmawia (Valtea).
- The 2018 award was given to Lalnunsanga, vocalist of a rock band T. Melody from Myanmar.
