= Lunglei East Assembly constituency =

Constituency of the Mizoram legislative assembly in India

Coordinates: 22.889°N 92.747°E

Lunglei East
- Constituency No. 31 for the Mizoram Legislative Assembly
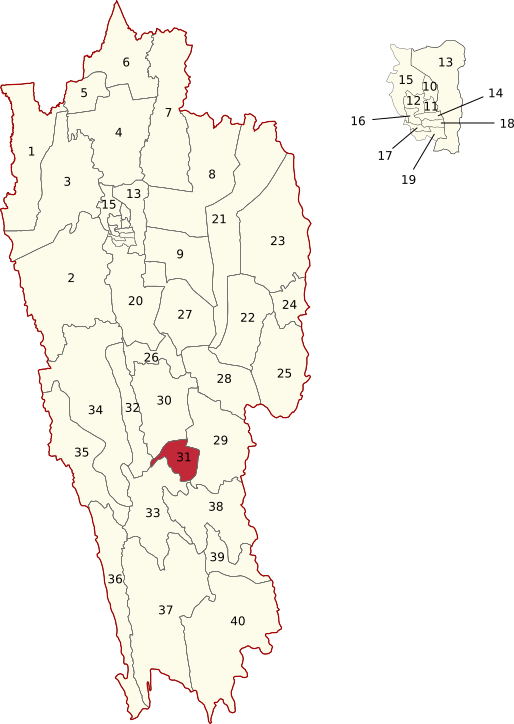

Constituency details
- Country: India
- Region: Northeast India
- State: Mizoram
- District: Lunglei
- Lok Sabha constituency: Mizoram
- Established: 2008
- Total electors: 13,064
- Reservation: ST

Member of Legislative Assembly
- 9th Mizoram Legislative Assembly
- Incumbent Lalrinpuii
- Party: Zoram People's Movement
- Elected year: 2023

Lunglei East is one of the 40 Legislative Assembly constituencies of Mizoram state in India. It is part of Lunglei district and is reserved for candidates belonging to the Scheduled Tribes. As of 2023, it is represented by Lalrinpuii of the Zoram People's Movement party.

== Members of the Legislative Assembly ==
Election	Name	Party
2008	Joseph Lalhimpuia	Indian National Congress
2013	Joseph Lalhimpuia	Indian National Congress
2018	Lawmawma Tochhawng	Mizo National Front
2023	Lalrinpuii	Zoram People's Movement

== Election results ==
=== 2023 ===
2023 Mizoram Legislative Assembly election: Lunglei East
Party	Candidate	Votes	%	±%
ZPM	Lalrinpuii			
MNF	Lawmawma Tochhawng			
INC	Joseph Lalhimpuia			
NOTA	None of the Above			
Majority				
Turnout				
		Swing		

=== 2018 ===
2018 Mizoram Legislative Assembly election: Lunglei East
Party	Candidate	Votes	%	±%
MNF	Lawmawma Tochhawng			
NOTA	None of the Above			
Majority				
Turnout				
gain from		Swing		
