= Ronald Sapa Tlau =

Indian politician (1954–2025)

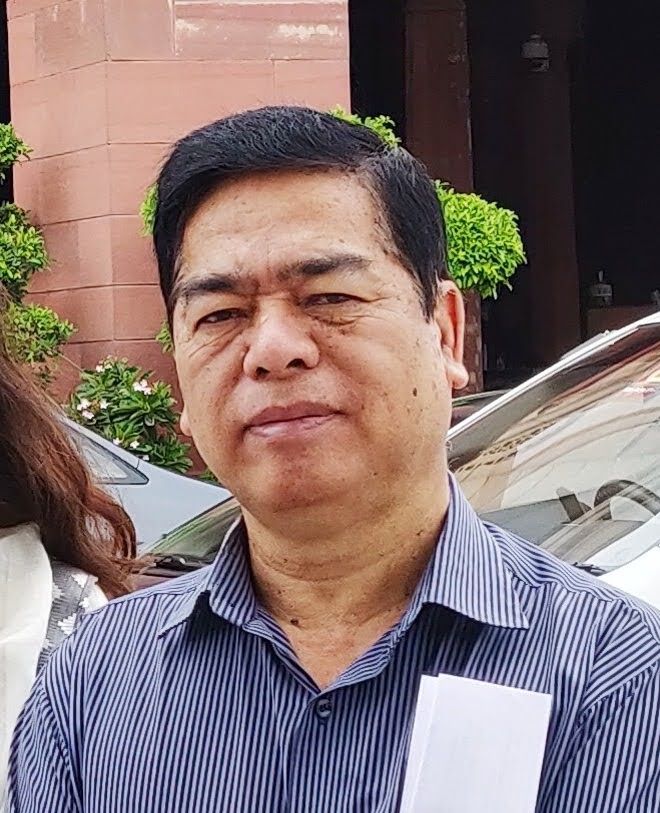

MP of Rajya Sabha for Mizoram
- In office 19 July 2014 – 18 July 2020
- Preceded by: Lalhming Liana
- Succeeded by: K Vanlalvena
- Constituency: Mizoram

Personal details
- Born: 4 February 1954 Hualtu, Mizo District, Assam, India
- Died: 30 April 2025 (aged 71) New Delhi, India
- Party: Indian National Congress
- Spouse: Ramthanpari Tlau
- Children: 2 sons, 1 daughter
- As of 15 June, 2014

Ronald Sapa Tlau (4 February 1954 – 30 April 2025) was an Indian National Congress politician from the northeastern state of Mizoram, who represented Mizoram in the Rajya Sabha.

== Early life and education ==
Ronald Sapa Tlau was born on February 4, 1954, in Hualtu village of Serchhip district.He completed his undergraduate studies from Spicer Adventist University and post-graduate studies from Howard University in Communication for rural development.

== Career ==
Tlau served as Vice President of Mizoram Pradesh Congress Committee from 2024. He was the chairman of the public-sector Zoram Electronics Development Corporation Limited (ZENICS) from 2009 and also unsuccessfully contested the Assembly polls from the Hrangturzo seat in the Mizoram Assembly elections in 2008.

=== Rajya Sabha MP ===
Tlau was nominated to become a member of Rajya Sabha by winning 34 of the 40 seats of the Mizoram Legislative Assembly in 2014. He was a Member of:

- Parliamentary Committee on Health and Family Welfare of India.
- Parliamentary committee on Science and technology.
- Parliamentary Committee on Information Technology

He played an important role in the establishment of Zoram Medical College and Thenzawl golf course during his term as Rajya Sabha MP.

== Personal life and death ==
Tlau was married to Ramthanpari Tlau and had two sons and one daughter. He was a practising Seventh-day Adventist Christian.

Tlau died on 30 April 2025, at the age of 71 of multiple complications, including kidney failure.

== Books ==
Tlau wrote the following books:

- Raltiang Ram
- Sakhaw Zalenna
- Zoramthar
- Hindu Kulmut

== See also ==
- List of Rajya Sabha members from Mizoram
