= Lalmuanpuia Punte =

Indian politician

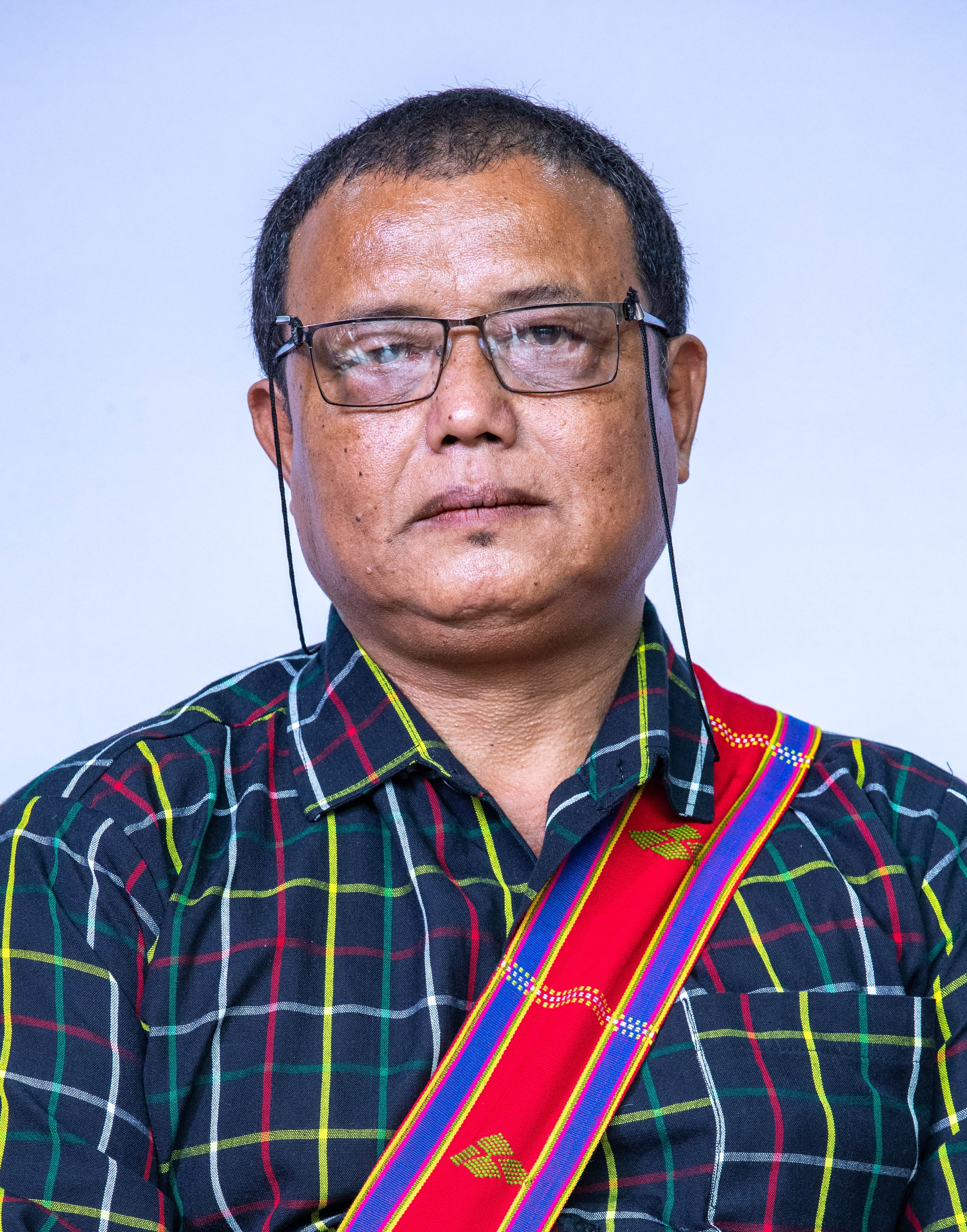
- Lalmuanpuia Punte in 2023

MLA in the 9th Mizoram Legislative Assembly
- In office 2023 - Present
- Constituency: Hrangturzo Assembly constituency

Personal details
- Born: 16 May 1967 (age 59) Tuahzawl, Mamit District, Mizoram
- Party: Zoram People's Movement
- Spouse: Lalhmachhuani (Chawki)

Lalmuanpuia Punte is a Hmar politician currently serving as a political Advisor to Lalduhoma, the Chief Minister of Mizoram. He is also an MLA in the 9th Mizoram Legislative Assembly from the Hrangturzo Assembly constituency and is from the Zoram People's Movement party, the current ruling party in Mizoram.

== Early life ==
Lalmuanpuia Punte was born on 16 May 1967 in Tuahzawl, Mamit district, Mizoram. His father’s name is Thanzama. He is married to Lalhmachhuani and the couple has two children. He completed a Bachelor of Arts from North-Eastern Hill University (NEHU) in 1995.

== See also ==
- Hmar people
