= Vanlalzawma =

Indian politician

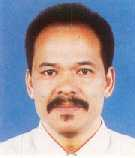

Member of Parliament, Lok Sabha
- In office 6 October 1999–16 May 2009
- Preceded by: H. Lallungmuana
- Succeeded by: C. L. Ruala
- Constituency: Mizoram

Personal details
- Born: 10 February 1956 (age 70) Lunglei, Mizoram, India
- Party: MNF
- Spouse: Remtluangi
- Children: 3 sons, V.L. Hriatpuia, C. Hmingsanga, Lalrin Nunga
- As of 16 September, 2006

Vanlalzawma is a politician from Mizoram who was a Member for the Mizoram (Lok Sabha constituency) in the 13th Lok Sabha and 14th Lok Sabha. Before he became a politician, he was the president of the Central Young Mizo Association (CYMA) in 1993 at the age of 37, where he served two terms. During this period CYMA had wildlife conservation as its yearly goal ("nungcha humhalh kum" in Mizo) and Vanlalzawma received an award for CYMA from the President of India, for successful wildlife conservation in Mizoram.

At the age of 43, he was elected to be the MP of Mizoram in 1999 (He was a history lecturer prior to this and he has deep interest in education). Immediately after he became an MP in 2000, he successfully pursued the overdue Mizoram University Bill in the Parliament, resulting in the establishment of Mizoram University (MZU) 2 July 2001, by the Mizoram University Act (2000) of the Parliament of India.

He is a good mathematician and besides his career he enjoys playing chess, having been the highest rated chess player in Mizoram for several years. He is also a talented runner and has won several medals at Mizoram Games in the 100 meters sprint.

In the vote of confidence on 22 July 2008 that the United Progressive Alliance (UPA) won with a 275–256 margin. Among these ten, two MPs toed their party line of equidistance from the Indian National Congress and Bharatiya Janata Party (BJP): Mamata Banerjee of the Trinamool Congress and Vanlalzawma of the Mizo National Front.

== Education ==
He was educated at Pachhunga University College and North-Eastern Hill University (NEHU) and has completed his Education in MA History.

== Career ==
He served as lecturer at Hrangbana College and was elected as President of the Young Mizo Association (YMA), the largest NGO in Mizoram.

== Politics ==
He is a member of the Mizo National Front and represented the Mizoram constituency in the Lok Sabha from 1999 to 2009. He was a member of the following committees.

- Member of Committee on Petroleum & Natural Gas
- Member of Consultative Committee, Department of Youth Affairs and Sports.
- Member of Committee on Human Resource Development.
- Member of Committee on Ministry of Communications and Information Technology
