= A. N. Rai =

Indian educator (born 1955)

2nd Vice chancellor of Mizoram University
- Succeeded by: R. Lalthantluanga

Personal details
- Profession: Professor
- Scientific career
- Born: 1 November 1955 (age 70); Parsa, Uttar Pradesh, India
- Education: Banaras Hindu University (MSc); Dundee University (PhD)
- Fields: Biochemistry
- Workplaces: University of Hyderabad; North Eastern Hill University; Mizoram University; NAAC

Amar Nath Rai (born 1 November 1955) is an Indian educator. He is a professor of biochemistry at the North Eastern Hill University. He had served as Vice Chancellor of Mizoram University and North Eastern Hill University. Between 2013 and 2015, he was Director of the National Assessment and Accreditation Council (NAAC) of India.

He had been a visiting professor at Uppsala University and Stockholm University. His research in nitrogen fixation and symbiosis in cyanobacteria are internationally acclaimed. He is an elected Fellow of the Linnean Society of London.

== Early life and education ==
Rai was born on 1 November 1955 and raised in Parsa, Ghazipur district. He completed BSc (Honours) from Gorakhpur University, and MSc with Gold Medal from Banaras Hindu University. He obtained PhD from Dundee University, Scotland. He continued there for a post-doctoral from 1980 to 1983. He initially joined the faculty of the University of Hyderabad as a lecturer in July 1983. He then got appointment as Reader in the Department of Biochemistry, NEHU, in December 1984. He became the youngest Professor of the university in March 1987.

== Professional career ==
Rai had served as Head of the Department of Biochemistry, and Dean of School of Life Sciences at North-Eastern Hill University (NEHU). He was a member of the Education Reform Commission for the Government of Mizoram and has served as member of Central Advisory Board on Education (CABE) and Scientific Advisory Committee to the cabinet (SAC-C), Government of India. He has been member of various committees under UGC and DST. He has been the Vice Chancellor of two central universities: Mizoram University and North-Eastern Hill University. He joined the office of the Director of National Assessment and Accreditation Council on 20 June 2013. Before he could complete his five-year tenure he left the post on 21 April 2015, and returned to NEHU.

== Awards and honours ==
- Visiting professor at Uppsala University and Stockholm University between 1985 and 2002
- Was Elected Fellow of the Linnean Society of London in 1982
- Was Elected Member of the Institute of Biology, London in 1982
- Amity Academic Excellence Award
- Young Scientist Award (Biotechnology)

== Scientific works ==
Rai has published more than 90 technical papers and the following 3 books:

- Stress Biology of Cyanobacteria: Molecular Mechanisms to Cellular Responses (CRC Press, 2013) ISBN 9781466504783
- Cyanobacteria in Symbiosis (Springer, 2002) ISBN 9781402007774
- CRC Handbook of Symbiotic Cyanobacteria (CRC Press, USA, 1990)ISBN 9780849332753
