= Christian Hospital Serkawn =

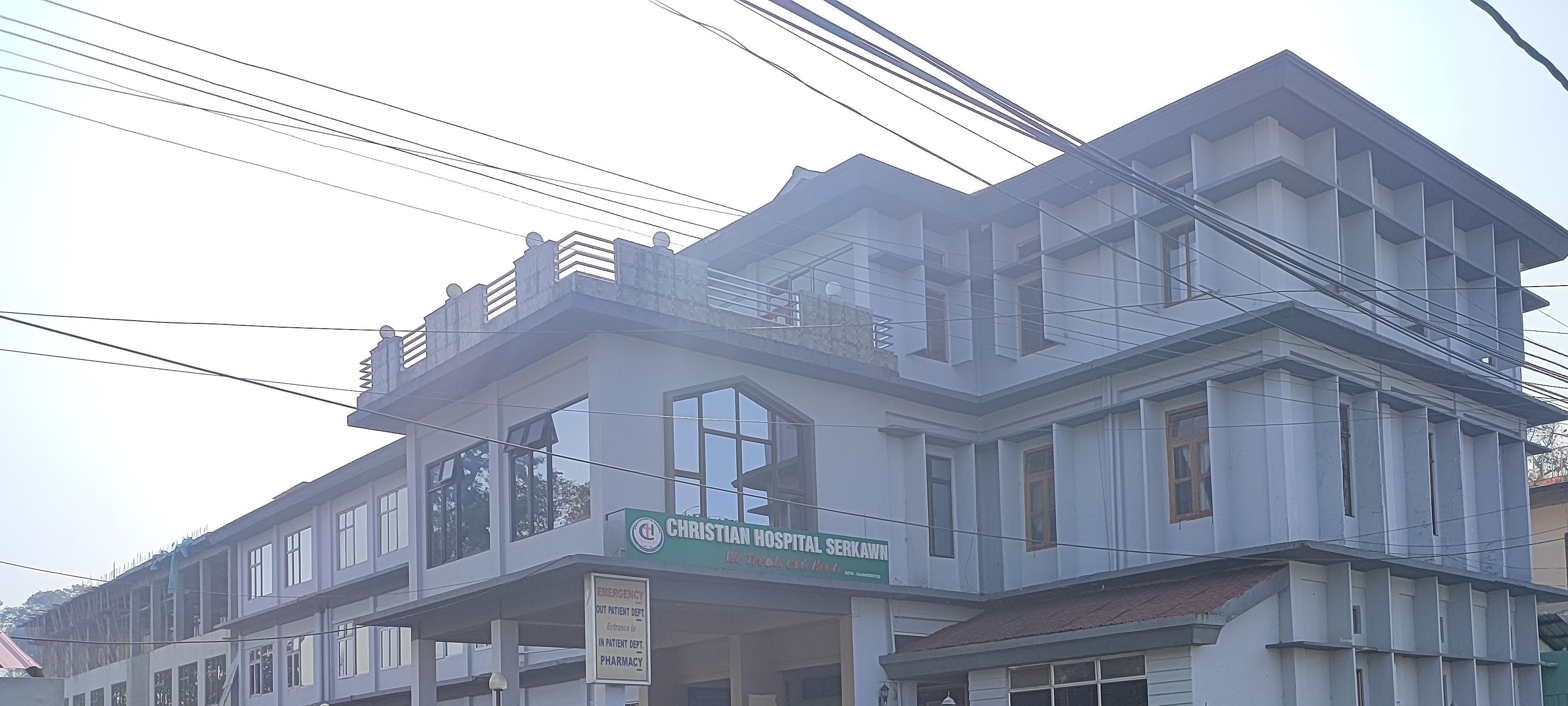

Geography
- Location: Lunglei, India
- Coordinates: 22.907°N 92.758°E

Organisation
- Care system: Private
- Type: Not-for-profit
- Religious affiliation: Baptist Church of Mizoram

Services
- Emergency department: Yes
- Beds: 100

History
- Founded: 1919; 107 years ago

Links
- Website: www.mizobaptist.org/Medical.php

Christian Hospital Serkawn ("Serkawn Hospital") is a hospital-cum-nursing school at Serkawn, Lunglei, Mizoram, India, operated by the Baptist Church of Mizoram. Founded in 1919 and formally established in 1923, it was the first hospital and nursing school in Mizoram.

== History ==
Medical work at Christian Hospital Serkawn started in 1919, with the arrival of Miss E.O. Dicks (Pi Dawki), a missionary nurse from the Baptist Missionary Society (BMS), London. She started operating a dispensary at her residence. A separate building was constructed and was officially inaugurated on 10 February 1923. Initially, the hospital had a capacity of 30 beds for women and children. In 1957 the BMS deputed Dr. H.G. Stockley (Dr Zomuana) and his wife, also experienced in health-care, as first resident doctor serving the community at Serkawn. Nursing school was started in 1952, with a course in auxiliary nurse mid-wifery (ANM), under the tutorship of Miss E.M. Maltby (Pi Zohnuni), who was then the nursing superintendent. In 1964, Dr C. Silvera became the first Mizo doctor and first Medical Superintendent of the hospital.

== Nursing College ==
Christian Hospital Serkawn operates a General Nursing Midwifery (GNM) course in its campus. A course in Auxiliary Nurse Mid-wifery (ANM) was started in 1952 by Miss E.M. Maltby. The ANM School has now been upgraded to General Nursing and Midwifery (GNM) in accordance with the policy of the Indian Nursing Council.
