= List of Rajya Sabha members from Mizoram =

The Rajya Sabha (meaning the "Council of States") is the upper house of the Parliament of India. Mizoram elects 1 seat and they are indirectly elected by the state legislators of Mizoram, since 1972. Elections in within the state legislatures are held using Single transferable vote with proportional representation.

== Members ==
Members of the Rajya Sabha for Mizoram
Name	Party	Term start	Term end	Term
Lalbuaia	Indian National Congress	17/07/1972	16/07/1978	1
Lalsawia	Indian National Congress	17/07/1978	16/07/1984	1
C. Silvera	Indian National Congress	17/07/1984	16/07/1990 (Note: Resigned on 28/11/1989)	1
Hiphei	Indian National Congress	17/07/1990	16/07/1996	1
Hiphei	Indian National Congress	17/07/1996	16/07/2002	2
Lalhming Liana	Mizo National Front	19/07/2002	18/07/2008	1
Lalhming Liana	Mizo National Front	19/07/2008	18/07/2014	2
Ronald Sapa Tlau	Indian National Congress	19/07/2014	18/07/2020	1
K. Vanlalvena	Mizo National Front	19/07/2020	18/07/2026	1
K Laltluangkima (Note: Current Member)	Zoram People's Movement	19/07/2026	18/07/2032	1
