= Tawnluia =

Indian politician

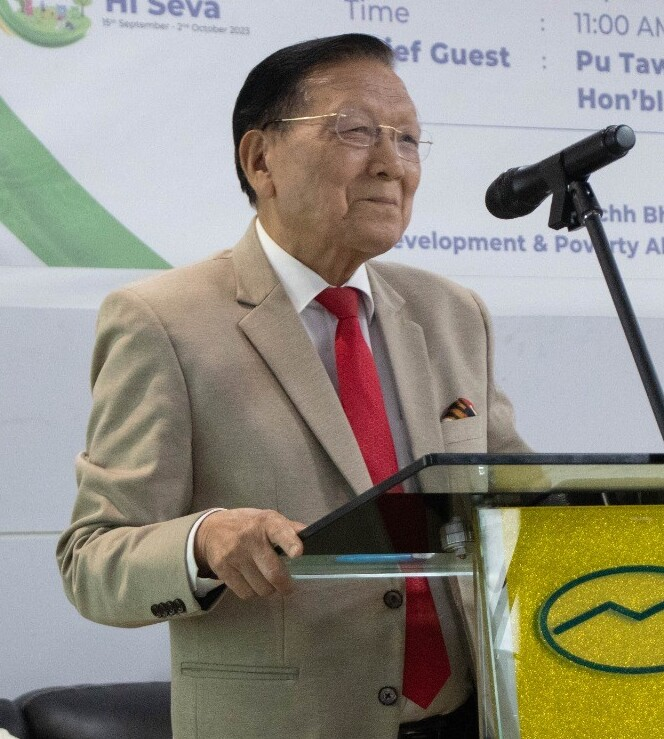

Deputy Chief Minister of Mizoram
- In office 15 December 2018 – 3 December 2023
- Departments: Public Health Engineering Department, Urban Development & Poverty Alleviation Department, Personnel & Administrative Reforms
- Preceded by: Lalhmingthanga DCM
- Constituency: Tuichang

Personal details
- Born: 6 June 1943 (age 83)
- Party: Mizo National Front
- Spouse: Lalhmingmawii

Tawnluia is an Indian politician from Mizo National Front. He was the second Deputy Chief Minister of Mizoram.

== Career ==
He has joined the Mizo National Front since 1963. He was the commander-in-chief of the disbanded Mizo National Army (MNA) for over 20 years.

He was elected to the Mizoram Legislative Assembly on the MNF Ticket in 1987, 1989, 1998, and 2003. He again won the Tuichang Assembly seat in the year 2018. He is also the current Senior Vice President of the Mizo National Front party. He has also been the Home Minister in previous MNF ministries in 1998 and 2003.
