= H. Lallungmuana =

Indian politician

Lallungmuana Hauhnar

Member of Parliament, Lok Sabha
- In office 10 March 1998 — 26 April 1999
- Preceded by: C. Silvera
- Succeeded by: Vanlalzawma
- Constituency: Mizoram

Personal details
- Born: 1 September 1944 (age 82) Biate, Mizoram
- Party: Independent
- As of 15 September, 2012

Pu H. Lallungmuana is a politician from Mizoram who was a Member of the Mizoram (Lok Sabha constituency) as an independent candidate in the 12th Lok Sabha, the lower house of the Indian Parliament.

== Politics ==
Lallungmuana was elected as an independent candidate supported by Mizo People's Conference and Zoram Nationalist Party combine in 1998 when he defeated his nearest Congress rival and veteran Congress leader John Lalsangzuala by a margin of 41 votes.
