= C. L. Ruala =

Indian politician

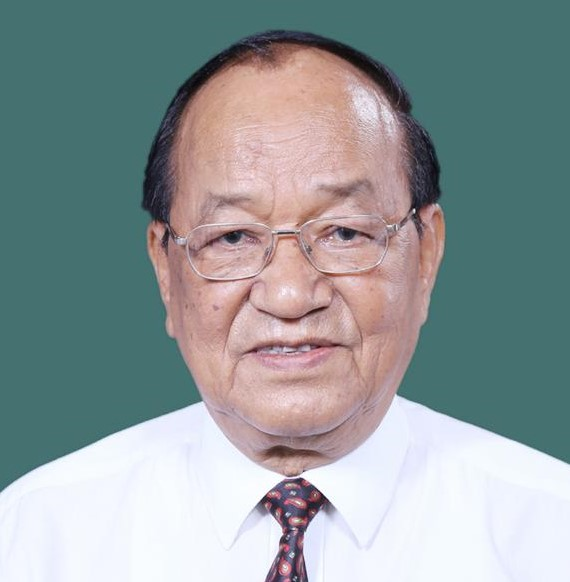

Member of Parliament Lok Sabha
- In office 16 May 2009 – 23 May 2019
- Preceded by: Vanlalzawma
- Succeeded by: C.Lalrosanga
- Constituency: Mizoram

Personal details
- Born: 25 December 1935 (age 90) Chawnhu, Lawngtlai District, Mizoram
- Party: Indian National Congress
- Spouse: Lalhmingthangi
- Children: 5
- As of 20 May, 2014

C. L. Ruala (born 25 December 1935) is an Indian politician from Mizoram and member of the Indian National Congress. He was a Member of Parliament of the 16th Lok Sabha, the lower house of the Indian Parliament. He was elected from the single-seat Mizoram constituency. He won over Robert Romawia, IND candidate, and M. Lalmanzuala, Aam Aadmi Party candidate, by getting a total vote of 210,485 (48.7%). He was also elected member in the previous term during 2009-2014.

== Education ==
After schooling in Mizoram he was educated at St. Edmund's College, Shillong (under Gauhati University) and graduated with B.A. and B.T. degrees.

== Personal life ==
Ruala was born in the small village of Chawnhu in southern Mizoram to father Thanzinga and mother Thangpuii. He married Lalhmingthangi on 8 February 1966, and they have five sons.

== Career ==
He became a teacher before he entered politics. Ruala became a successful politician since he was nominated to the Mizo District Council (when Mizoram was under Government of Assam) in 1970. After Mizoram became a Union Territory he was elected to member of the Mizoram Legislative Assembly. He became Cabinet Minister during 1984-1987. His career was interrupted by the Mizoram Peace Accord in 1987 when the ruling Congress Party surrendered their government to make way for settlement between Mizo National Front and Government of India. He won the next Mizoram general election in 1989, and the subsequent elections in 1993. During these two terms he was a Cabinet Minister. From 1998 he took official works in the party office for ten years. In 2009, he was elected as Member of Parliament to the 15th Lok Sabha, and again in 2014 to the 16th Lok Sabha.
