= Sangliana =

Indian politician

Member of Parliament (Lok Sabha)
- In office 1972–1977
- Preceded by: New constituency
- Succeeded by: R. Rothuama
- Constituency: Mizoram

Personal details
- Born: Mizoram
- As of 17 September, 2012

Sangliana is a politician from Mizoram in India. He was its first Member of Parliament representing the state in the 5th Lok Sabha, the lower house of the Indian Parliament. He was elected as a candidate of the Mizo Union.
