= Dulte =

- village
- Location in Mizoram, India Dulte (India)
- Coordinates: 23.643268°N 93.0582459°E
- Country: India
- State: Mizoram
- District: Champhai
- Block: Khawzawl
- Elevation: 931 m (3,054 ft)

Population (2011)
  - Total: 908
- Time zone: UTC+5:30 (IST)
- 2011 census code: 271305

Dulte is a village in the Champhai district of Mizoram, India. It is located in the Khawzawl R.D. Block.

== Demographics ==
According to the 2011 census of India, Dulte has 194 households. The effective literacy rate (i.e. the literacy rate of population excluding children aged 6 and below) is 97.81%.

Demographics (2011 Census)
	Total	Male	Female
Population	908	446	462
Children aged below 6 years	133	67	66
Scheduled caste	0	0	0
Scheduled tribe	899	440	459
Literates	758	371	387
Workers (all)	491	263	228
Main workers (total)	486	263	223
Main workers: Cultivators	332	227	105
Main workers: Agricultural labourers	1	0	1
Main workers: Household industry workers	1	1	0
Main workers: Other	152	35	117
Marginal workers (total)	5	0	5
Marginal workers: Cultivators	1	0	1
Marginal workers: Agricultural labourers	2	0	2
Marginal workers: Household industry workers	0	0	0
Marginal workers: Others	2	0	2
Non-workers	417	183	234
