= C. Silvera =

Indian politician (1953–2016)

Minister of State for Health and Family Welfare
- In office 17 February 1994 – 15 September 1999
- Preceded by: D.K. Tara Devi Siddhartha
- Succeeded by: Paban Singh Ghatowar

Member of Parliament (Lok Sabha)
- In office 1991–1996, 1996–1997, 1997-1998
- Preceded by: Lalduhawma
- Succeeded by: H. Lallungmuana
- Constituency: Mizoram

Personal details
- Born: 6 May 1935 Muallianpui, Lunglei District, Mizoram
- Died: 9 April 2016 (aged 80) Tuikhuahtlang, Aizawl, Mizoram
- Party: Indian National Congress
- Spouse: Lallawmzuali
- Children: 3 sons
- As of 15 September, 2012

C. Silvera (6 May 1935 – 9 April 2016) was a medical doctor and a Congress politician in Mizoram, India. He was the longest serving member of Parliament of India from the Mizoram (Lok Sabha constituency).

== Early life ==
Son of C. Hlunthuama, Silvera was born in Muallianpui village in southern Mizoram. He studied medicine at Christian Medical College, Vellore, and earned his MBBS in 1964. He was appointed as the first Medical Superintendent at Christian Hospital Serkawn, a hospital under Baptist Missionary Society (BMS), London, and later under Baptist Church of Mizoram.

== Career ==
He was elected member of Rajya Sabha for the term 1984-1990 from Mizoram. He was elected in the 9th Lok Sabha, 10th Lok Sabha and the 11th Lok Sabha.

C. Silvera was inducted as the first Mizo to be in the Indian Union Council of Ministers as Minister of State for Ministry of Health and Family Welfare. He was inducted to office on 17 February 1994. In 1995 he became Minister of State for Industry.

== Death ==
He died of sudden stroke on 9 April 2016 at his home in Tuikhuahtlang, Aizawl.

== See also ==
- List of Rajya Sabha members from Mizoram
