= K. Vanlalvena =

Indian politician

K Vanlalvena
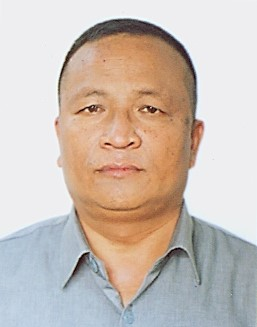

Member of Parliament, Rajya Sabha
- In office 19 July 2020 – 18 July 2026
- Preceded by: Ronald Sapa Tlau
- Succeeded by: K. Laltluangkima
- Constituency: Mizoram

Personal details
- Born: 14 January 1970 (age 56) East Lungdar Serchhip District, Mizoram, India
- Party: Mizo National Front
- Spouse: H. Lalhuapzauvi
- Children: 3

K. Vanlalvena (born 14 January 1970) is an Indian politician and a former member of Parliament at the Rajya Sabha from Mizoram. He belongs to the Mizo National Front.

== Education ==
He completed his Bachelor's in Science at Pachhunga University College in 1993.

== Career ==
He was the former President of the Mizo Zirlai Pawl, a student union in Mizoram. He joined politics in 2002 as general secretary of Mizo National Front's youth wing and later as president of the Youth wing of Mizo National Front. He had previously lost in a bypoll held in Aizawl North-3 in November 2015. He is also currently a member of the National Core Committee of Mizo National Front.

== Personal life ==
He is married to H. Lalhuapzauvi and has 3 children.

== See also ==
- List of Rajya Sabha members from Mizoram
