= Lalhmingthanga =

Indian politician

Pu Lalhmingthanga (born 3 June 1940) is an Indian politician who was the chief of the Mizoram People's Conference, a recognised political party in the Indian state of Mizoram. He was a member of the Mizoram Legislative Assembly representing Lunglei South (Legislative Assembly constituency) in 2003–2008. He served as Deputy CM of state under Zoramthanga.
