= Education in Mizoram =

Education in Indian state

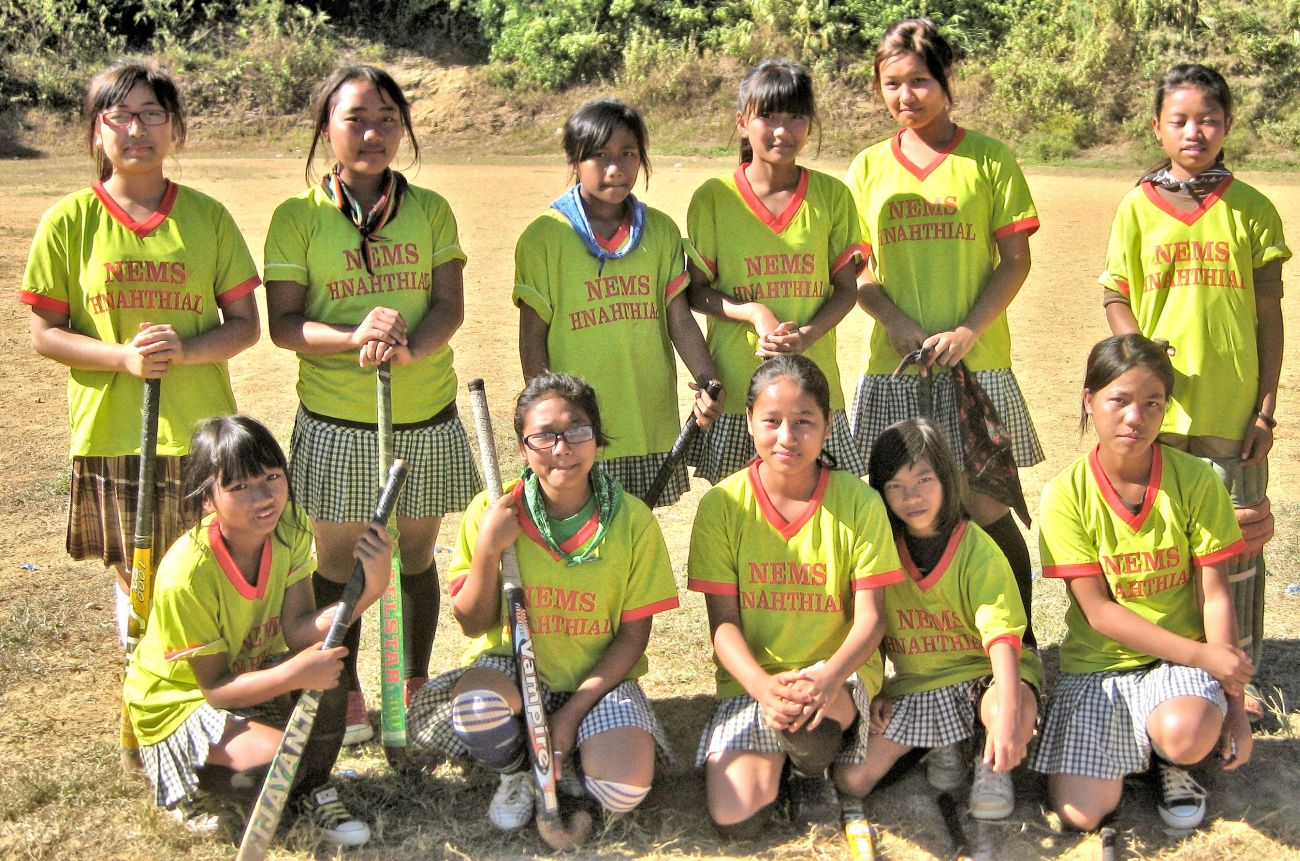
Students of Nuchhungi English Medium School Hnahthial at Lunglei in Mizoram

Education in Mizoram consists of a diverse array of formal education systems ranging from elementary to university, from training institution to technical courses. The Government of India imposes mandatory education at least up to the basic level. For this public schools are made free of fees, and provided with free textbooks and school lunch.

In spite of relatively late education system, as of the latest census in 2011, Mizoram is the second highest in literacy rate (91.58%) among the Indian states. As of 2025, Mizoram holds the highest literacy rate in India, with a rate of 98.2%.

== History ==
Before the land of the Mizos was annexed to the British Empire in 1890, Mizos were without written language and were totally illiterate. Knowledge was predominantly imparted orally at the Zawlbuk, the traditional learning centre of the Mizos. In 1894 two English missionaries of Arthington Aborigines Mission Dr. (Rev) J.H. Lorrain and Rev. F.W. Savidge arrived at Aizawl. They immediately worked on creating Mizo alphabets based on Roman script. After a stay of only two and half months, they started the first school on 1 April 1894. Their first and only pupils were Suaka and Thangphunga. The two teachers were surprised that their students had mastered the new alphabets in only a week. The first textbook Mizo Zir Tir Bu (A Lushai Primer) was released on 22 October 1895 and became the first book in Mizo language. A Welsh missionary Rev. D.E. Jones from the Calvinistic Methodist Mission then took up the education under government recognition in 1898. He organised classes for about thirty students at the verandah of his residence. He was assisted by a Khasi couple Rai Bhajur and his wife. A new government school was opened in Lunglei in 1897, and Bengali script was used for teaching. In 1901 the government honoured Lalluava, the Chief of Khawngbâwk, for his deed towards the British by establishing primary school in his village. By 1903 there were schools in fifteen villages. In 1903 the British administration started promoting education by waiving forced labour (called kuli) for those who passed class IV (primary school), in addition to scholarship for meritorious students and grants to existing schools. The first scholarship was given to 8 students with the amount of INR 3 each per month for 2 years. The first systematic examination called Lower Primary Exam was conducted on 25 June 1903, with 19 candidates (2 girl among 17 boys). Eleven of them passed. Sir Bamfield Fuller, Assam Chief Commissioner, visited Mizoram (then Lushai Hills) in February 1904, and was so impressed with the mission schools that he immediately issued an order for dissolution of all government schools. He also presented Gold Medal to Chhuahkhama (among boys) and Saii (among girls). In 1904 the entire educational administration was charged under the mission, and Rev. Edwind Rowlands became the first Honorary Inspector of Schools from April 1. The first middle school (was called upper primary) came up in 1906 in Aizawl. The first high school named Mizo High School was opened in February 1944 at Zarkawt. There were 56 students in class VII, under the headmaster Rev David Evan Jones.

By 1941 Census of India Lushai had attained highest literacy rate (36%) in India. Till the late 1952 the church managed elementary education through Honorary Inspector of Schools. On 25 April 1952 Lushai Hills became Mizo District Council under the Government of Assam. A post of Deputy Inspector was created by the government. In 1953 the designation of Honorary Inspector was changed to Secretary, Education Management Committee. Under this administration all primary and middle scholarship examinations were coordinated. In 1953 the first teachers' training institute Basic Training Centre was opened. On 15 August 1958 Pachhunga University College (then Aijal College) was inaugurated to become the first institute of higher education. In 1961 Education Officer became the administrative authority of education in the Mizo District Council. After Mizoram became Union Territory (in 1972) a separate Directorate of Education was created in 1973 under a separate ministry. Mizoram Board of School Education was established in 1976. Within a hundred years of education, Mizoram remains at the top list of highest literacy rate in India.

== School education ==
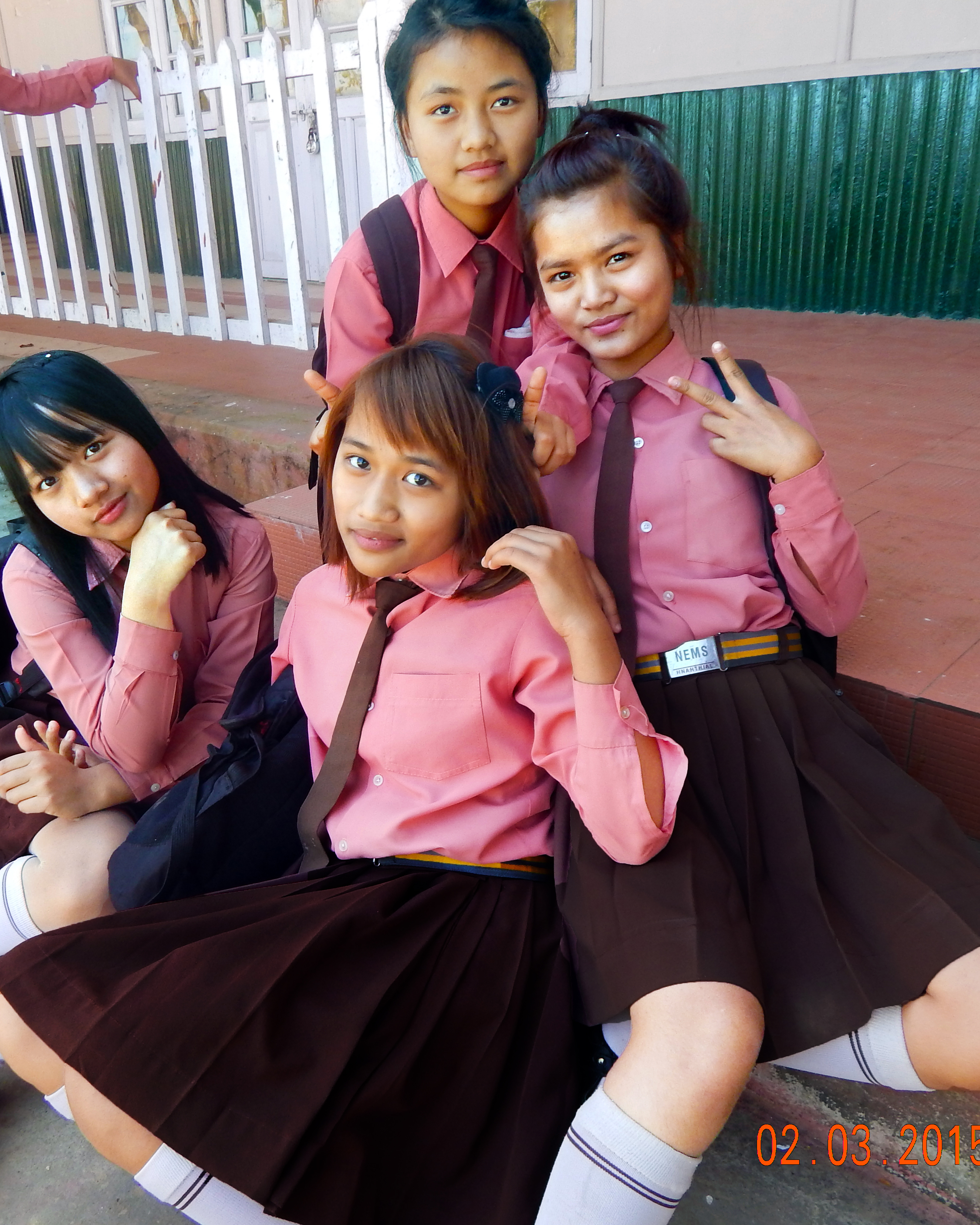
Nuchhungi English Medium School students at Hnahthial

The office of school education for Mizoram was started in 1973. It became a separate Directorate of School Education in 1989 and is located at McDonald Hill, Zarkawt, Aizawl. The department looks after elementary, secondary, higher education, language development, adult education and physical education within the state. The directorate administers the entire state and divides into 4 (four) education districts, namely (1) Chhimtuipui district, (2) Lunglei district,(3) Aizawl East district, and (4) Aizawl West district.

=== SCERT ===
The Mizoram State Council of Educational Research & Training was started in January 1980. It is an academic wing of the Directorate of School Education and is located at Chaltlang since its establishment. SCERT is responsible for qualitative improvement of school education from primary to higher secondary schools, non-formal education and teacher education. It is also responsible for successful implementation of various education projects sponsored by central government, UNICEF as well as state government.

=== District Institute of Education and Training (DIET) ===
The DIET in Mizoram was first established on 1 September 1973 at Chaltlang. It is a centre of training for school teachers which is mandatory for incumbent employees. It was then established at Lunglei and subsequently at all the other district capitals i.e. Saiha, Lawngtlai, Kolasib, Champhai, Serchhip and Mamit in 2005.

=== Mizoram Board of School Education ===
Mizoram Board of School Education is an autonomous academic body under the purview of the Department of Education, Government of Mizoram, India. It is an authority on conducting state level examinations of schools. The Mizoram State Board of School Examination evaluates students' progress by conducting two board examinations-one at the end of class 10 and the other at the end of class 12.

== Higher and technical education ==
Higher education under the Government of Mizoram is administered by the Directorate of Higher and Technical Education. It became the Department of Higher & Technical Education in 1989, with its head office at MacDonald Hill, Zarkawt. It is responsible for the administration of collegiate education, technical education beyond the higher secondary level and technical education at the diploma level and language development. There are 20 colleges, 2 deficit colleges including one Aizawl Law College, two training colleges (B.Ed. Training College and Hindi Training College) and two polytechnics under its jurisdiction.

== Right to education ==
The Government of Mizoram adopted the Right of Children to Free and Compulsory Education (RTE) Act, 2009, and based on it has enacted its own Mizoram Right of Children to Free and Compulsory Education Rules, 2011. The rules demand compulsory schooling for children aged between 6 and 14 years, special training for children in need of special development, provision of free textbooks and writing materials, free uniforms for BPL children.

== SSA in Mizoram ==
Mizoram state education department started implementing Sarva Shiksha Abhiyan from the financial year 2000-2001. Funds were utilised for various activities, such as conducting household survey, training of teachers, preparation of district plan, purchase of vehicles, etc. At the initial stage, when only Siaha district was selected for starting pre-project activities, there was no society constituted for this programme and no district committee was formed either. As a result, District Education Officer (DEO), Saiha and supporting staff in consultation with Directorate of School Education, carried out the pre-project activities. "The Mizoram Sarva Shiksha Abhiyan Raja Mission Rules 2001" was passed by the Mizoram Legislative Assembly and the same was published in the Mizoram Gazette on 1 August 2001. In the same year the Mizoram Sarva Shiksha Abhiyan mission was registered under the societies registration (extension to Mizoram) Act 1976 (Mizoram Act No. 3 of 1977).

== Foreign students ==
There has been increasing interest among Arakanese youths from Rakhine State, bordering Mizoram, to study in Mizoram such as in the ICFAI University. The university allows Myanmar students to enroll without a visa and offers strong job prospects for Rakhine youths.

== Higher education in Mizoram ==
The major institutes for higher education in Mizoram are

- College of Veterinary Sciences and Animal Husbandry, Selesih, Central Agricultural University
- ICFAI University, Mizoram
- Mizoram University
- National Institute of Electronics and Information Technology, Aizawl
- National Institute of Technology Mizoram

Most institutes are affiliated to Mizoram University including

- Government Aizawl College
- Government Aizawl North College
- Government Aizawl West College
- Government Champhai College
- Government Hrangbana College
- Government J. Buana College
- Government J. Thankima College
- Government Johnson College
- Government Kolasib College
- Government Mizoram Law College
- Government Saiha College
- Government Serchhip College
- Government T. Romana College
- Government Zirtiri Residential Science College
- Government Mamit College
- Government Saitual College
- Government Lawngtlai College
- Government Khawzawl College
- Government Hnahthial College
- Government Zawlnuam College
- Helen Lowry College of Arts & Commerce
- Kamalanagar College
- Lunglei Government College
- Mizoram College of Nursing
- Zoram Medical College
- National Institute of Electronics and Information Technology, Aizawl
- Pachhunga University College (constituent college)
- St. Xavier's College, Lengpui
- Regional Institute of Paramedical and Nursing Aizawl
- Higher and Technical Institute of Mizoram
