= Mizoram College Teachers' Association =

- Abbreviation: MCTA
- Formation: 7 September 1979
- Type: Governmental organisation
- Legal status: Active Mizoram government organisation
- Purpose: To ensure quality undergraduate education Promotion of higher and technical education To safeguard and promote teachers' welfare
- Headquarters: Aizawl, India
- Region served: Mizoram
- Members: All incumbent college teachers under Government of Mizoram
- Official language: Mizo, English
- President: Thanglura
- Website: http://www.mcta.org.in

The Mizoram College Teachers' Association (MCTA) is a governmental, non-political and non-profit organisation for college teachers under the Government of Mizoram, India. It was established by a conference of college teachers on 7 September 1979 at Aizawl, which became its headquarters. The organisation is recognised by the Government of Mizoram, and consists of 21 government colleges and 1 grant-in-aid college.

Membership is exclusively to those teachers working in the college or other higher education institute under the Government of Mizoram, and who were recruited under the norms of the University Grants Commission (India).

== Aims and objectives ==
The aims and objectives of MCTA are:

1. to ensure quality education in Mizoram
2. to cooperate with the government in the promotion of higher & technical Education
3. to safeguard and promote common interests of college teachers, and to inculcate among the teachers the spirit of cooperation.

== Membership ==
MCTA opens membership to teachers of higher education under the Government of Mizoram, but only those appointed according to the norms of UGC. Enrolment requires a fee of INR 100, and annual fee of INR 50. Membership ceases on death, retirement, transfer to other post, and failure to pay fee. Every member is also imposed to contribute a welfare fund of INR 100 and condolence fund of INR 300 annually.

== Branches ==
Affiliated colleges of MCTA are called branch members, and include:

1. Government Aizawl College, Aizawl
2. Government Aizawl North College, Aizawl
3. Government Aizawl West College, Aizawl
4. Government Champhai College, Champhai
5. College of Teachers Education, Aizawl
6. Government Hnahthial College, Hnahthial
7. Government Hrangbana College, Aizawl
8. Government J. Buana College, Lunglei
9. Government J. Thankima College, Aizawl
10. Government Johnson College, Aizawl
11. Kamalanagar College, Kalamanagar
12. Government Khawzawl College, Khawzawl
13. Government Kolasib College, Kolasib
14. Government Lawngtlai College, Lawngtlai
15. Lunglei Government College, Lunglei
16. Government Mamit College, Mamit
17. Government Saiha College, Saiha
18. Government Saitual College, Saitual
19. Government Serchhip College, Serchhip
20. Government T. Romana College, Aizawl
21. Government Zawlnuam College, Zawlnuam
22. Government Zirtiri Residential Science College, Aizawl

== Membership to Mizoram University ==
MCTA represent the state government colleges to the Academic Council of Mizoram University, under which all member branches are affiliated. Currently, President Thanglura, Vice-President J.H. Zoremthanga, and General Secretary P.L. Ramliana are the representatives.
