= Mizoram Engineering College =

College in Mizoram, India

- Type: Engineering College
- Affiliations: Mizoram University
- Location: Lunglei, Mizoram, 796701, India; 22.949°N 92.767°E
- Campus: Urban
- Mizoram Engineering College, Lunglei Mizoram Engineering College (India)

Mizoram Engineering College is the only engineering college in the town of Lunglei, Mizoram.

== Location ==
Mizoram Engineering College is located in Pukpui, about 12 kilometres (7.5 mi) from Lunglei. The College has 24.9 acres (10.1 ha) of land.

== History ==
Mizoram Engineering College was inaugurated on 3rd Feb 2019 by Prime Minister Narendra Modi. The first department to start functioning will be the Civil Engineering Department for the 2019–2020 academic session. The College has been constructed under the Rashtriya Uchchatar Shiksha Abhiyan scheme. As of December 2020 the college has still not been able to start functioning due to lack of basic amenities. The approach road, water and power requirements are still to be completed.

== Departments ==
The College has the following departments:

- Civil Engineering
- Computer Science & Engineering

== Facilities ==
Mizoram Engineering College has been constructed at a cost of 26 crores and has an Administrative block, academic block, laboratory, library, cafetaria, student common room, boys and girls hostel. It has been built to accommodate up to 300 students.

== See also ==
- Education in India
- Education in Mizoram
- Mizoram University
