= Civil Hospital, Aizawl =

- Government of Mizoram

Geography
- Location: Aizawl, Mizoram, India
- Coordinates: 23.7323451°N 92.7159269°E

Organisation
- Care system: Public

Services
- Emergency department: Yes
- Beds: 300

History
- Founded: 1896; 130 years ago

Links
- Website: cha.mizoram.gov.in

Civil Hospital, Aizawl is a state-owned hospital in Aizawl, Mizoram, India. Founded as a 'Coolie Dispensary' in Colonial India in 1896, it grew up to the form of a hospital in 1906.

== History ==
The present 300 Bedded Civil Hospital Aizawl was established in 1896 with a few Beds, In 1906 the Hospital had around 12 Beds to cater to the Small population of that time. During 1960’s the Hospital had about 56 Beds (Male wards, Female wards, Isolating ward and Separate 12 Bedded T.B. wards). From 1966 onwards the massive influx / migration of Rural Population to Aizawl in search of Jobs, better Education and other opportunities necessitated the increase of bed strength to cope with the ever-increasing demand. Around 1980 the total bed strength was around 200. The first Post Graduate trained Doctor in General Surgery and OB/GYN joined the Hospital in 1971. Subsequently, more and more Post Graduate trained Doctors (Specialist) in various Specialities joined the Hospital from time to time leading to the Establishment of different departments based on Speciality to give need based specialized treatment.

== Facility ==
At present the following facilities for the best medical care services within the State of Mizoram are available in the Hospital – Surgery, Medicines, obs + Gynae, Pediatrics, Orthopedics, Dermatology, Radiology, Ophthalmology, ENT, Pathology, Bacteriology, Biochemistry, Anaesthesiology, Oncology, Forensic Medicines and Blood Bank. Presently the oncology department of this hospital is a Regional Cancer Centre funded by the Government of India.

== See also ==
- Healthcare in India
- Mizoram Institute of Medical Education & Research
