= Mimer =

Mimer may refer to:

- The Swedish and Danish name of the Norse god Mímir
- An iron ore mine in Norberg Municipality, Sweden
- Mimer SQL, a database management system named after the Norse god
- RoIP, a radio dispatch system
- Mizoram Institute of Medical Education & Research
