= List of institutions of higher education in Mizoram =

Tertiary institutions in India

Mizoram is a state in northeastern India. It has a number of institutions of higher education, some of which are listed below.

== Universities ==
- ICFAI University, Mizoram, Aizawl, established 2006
- Mizoram University (MZU), Aizawl, established 2000
- Mizoram State University (MZSU), Lunglei, established 2025 as cluster university

== Professional colleges ==
=== Engineering and technical ===
- Degree
  - National Institute of Electronics and Information Technology, Aizawl, autonomous institution equivalent to a university
  - National Institute of Technology Mizoram at Aizawl, autonomous institution equivalent to a university
- Polytech diplomas
  - Mizoram Polytechnic Lunglei, co-ed
  - Women's Polytechnic Aizawl, women-only

=== Medical ===
- Zoram Medical College at Aizawl, established 2018.

=== Para-medical ===
- Mizoram College of Nursing at Aizawl
- Regional Institute of Paramedical and Nursing Aizawl

=== Law ===
- Government Mizoram Law College

=== Veterinary ===
- College of Veterinary Sciences and Animal Husbandry, Selesih (constituent college) at Aizawl

== Colleges ==
- Aizawl district
  - Government Aizawl College
  - Government Aizawl North College
  - Government Aizawl West College
  - Government Hrangbana College
  - Government J. Thankima College
  - Government Johnson College
  - Government T. Romana College
  - Helen Lowry College of Arts & Commerce
  - Pachhunga University College at Aizawal (constituent college)
- Champhai district
  - Government Champhai College
- Hnahthial district
  - Government Hnahthial College
- Khawzawl district
  - Government Khawzawl College
- Kolasib district
  - Government Kolasib College

- Lawngtlai district
  - Government Lawngtlai College
  - Kamalanagar College
- Lunglei district
  - Government J. Buana College
  - Lunglei Government College
  - St. Xavier's College, Lengpui
- Mamit district
  - Government Mamit College
  - Government Zawlnuam College
- Saiha district
  - Government Saiha College
- Saitual district
  - Government Zirtiri Residential Science College
  - Government Saitual College
- Serchhip district
  - Government Serchhip College

== See also ==
- Education in India
