= COVID-19 pandemic in Mizoram =

Ongoing COVID-19 viral pandemic in Mizoram, India

- Disease: COVID-19
- Pathogen: SARS-CoV-2
- Location: Mizoram, India
- First outbreak: Wuhan, Hubei, China
- Arrival date: 14 April 2020 (6 years, 4 months, 2 weeks and 5 days)
- Confirmed cases: 1,333 (10 September 2020)
- Active cases: 583
- Recovered: 750 (10 September 2020)
- Deaths: 20
- Fatality rate: 0%

The first case of the COVID-19 pandemic in India was reported on 30 January 2020. Slowly, the pandemic spread to various states and union territories including the state of Mizoram. The first case was recorded in this region on 24 March 2020, and the first death was recorded on 28 October 2020.

== Timeline ==
=== March 2020 ===
- The first case of coronavirus was confirmed on 24 March in a resident from Aizawl, He had returned from Netherlands on 16 March and started developing symptoms including fever and cough. He was isolated in Zoram Medical College.
- Section 144 clamped in Mizoram to contain COVID-19.

=== April 2020 ===
- As of 19 April, there are no COVID-19 cases in Mizoram, a 22-year-old woman cancer patient from the state tested positive on 13 April in Mumbai, three more COVID-19 positive cases have been reported in the Mumbai Mizoram house.

=== May 2020 ===
- As of 4 May 2020, a 74-year-old man from Mizoram, who had tested positive for COVID-19 died on 3 May 2020 in Kolkata. He is the first person from Mizoram to die of COVID-19.
- As of 9 May 2020, Mizoram becomes COVID-19 free as lone patient recovers.

=== June 2020 ===
- As of 2 June 2020, the total number of cases in Mizoram was 12.
- As of 5 June 2020, the total number of cases in Mizoram was 22. There are 21 active cases and one has fully recovered from the virus.
- As of 7 June, the total number of cases is 42, including 41 active cases and one recovery.
- On 11 June, total cases in Mizoram crossed 100 mark.
- As of 13 June, the total number of cases was 107, including 106 active cases and one recovery.
- As of 26 June, the total number of cases was 147, including 100 active cases and 47 recoveries.

=== July 2020 ===
- As of 5 July 2020, the total number of cases in Mizoram was 162. There are 35 active cases and 127 have been cured.
- As of 7 July 2020, the total number of cases in Mizoram was 197. There are 58 active cases and 139 have been cured.
- As of 8 July 2020, the total number of cases in Mizoram was 203, including 60 active cases and 143 recoveries.
- As of 15 July 2020, the total number of cases in the UT was 238, including 79 active cases and 159 cures.
- As of 18 July 2020, the total number of cases in Mizoram was 282, including 115 active cases and 167 cures.
- As of 23 July 2020, the total number of cases was 326, including 143 active cases and 183 cures.
- As of 25 July 2020, total number of cases was 361, including 178 active cases and 183 cured/discharged.

=== August 2020 ===
- On 4 August, Mizoram crossed the total cases tally of 500. As on this date, the total number of cases in Mizoram was 501. There are 219 active cases and 282 have recovered.
- As of 9 August 2020, the total number of cases was 566, including 270 active cases and 296 recoveries.
- As of 13 August 2020, the total number of cases was 649, which includes 306 active cases and 343 recoveries.
- As of 19 August 2020, the total number of cases was 860, including 481 active cases and 369 recoveries.
- As of 23 August 2020, the total number of cases was 918, including 457 active cases and 461 recoveries.
- As of 25 August 2020, the total number of cases in the state was 967, including 503 active cases and 464 recoveries.
- On 28 August 2020, total number of cases in Mizoram crossed 1000 mark.
- As of 30 August 2020, Mizoram is only Indian state where there has not been a single death due to COVID-19 (except UT of Lakshadweep which have not a single case of COVID-19 until now). The total number of cases in the state was 1011, including 422 active cases and 589 recoveries.

=== September 2020 ===
- As of 1 September 2020, the total number of cases in Mizoram was 1020, including 410 active cases and 610 recoveries.
- As of 6 September 2020, the total number of cases was 1114, including 382 active cases and 732 recoveries.
- As of 10 September 2020, the total number of cases was 1333, including 583 active cases and 750 recoveries. The total number of cases increased swiftly after 141 new cases were confirmed on the previous day. This was the largest number of new cases reported in 24 hours in the state.
  - Due to the spike in local transmission, various "Local Level Task Force" have restricted all non-essential travel in Aizawl. The city of Aizawl remained in an informal lockdown as contact-tracing was carried out by the State Government.
- As of 11 September 2020, the total number of cases was 1353, including 603 active cases and 750 recoveries.
- As of 17 September 2020, the total number of cases is 1506, including 567 active cases and 939 recoveries.
- As of 24 September 2020, the total number of cases is 1759, including 664 active cases and 1095 cures.
- As of 30 September 2020, Mizoram is only Indian state where there has not been a single death due to COVID-19 (except UT of Lakshadweep which have not a single case of COVID-19 until now).

=== October 2020 ===
- As of 2 October 2020, the total number of cases in Mizoram was 2049, including 313 active cases and 1736 recoveries.
- As of 4 October 2020, the total number of cases was 2120, including 329 active cases and 1791 recoveries.
- As of 6 October 2020, the total number of cases was 2128, including 291 active cases and 1837 cures.
- As of 14 October 2020, the total number of cases was 2212, including 119 active cases and 2093 cures.
- As of 20 October 2020, the total number of cases was 2280, including 117 active cases and 2163 recoveries.
- As of 22 October 2020, the total number of cases is 2341, including 167 active cases and 2174 recoveries.
- On 28 October 2020, Mizoram became the last state in India to register a death due to coronavirus.
- As of 31 October 2020, the total number of cases in the state is 2722, including 430 active cases and 2291 recoveries and 1 death.

=== November 2020 ===
- As of 4 November 2020, the total number of cases in Mizoram was 2893, including 457 active cases and 2435 recoveries and 1 person has died from virus.
- As of 8 November 2020, the total number of cases was 3090, including 470 active cases and 2618 recoveries and 2 deaths.
- As of 15 November 2020, the total number of cases was 3393, including 534 active cases and 2855 cures and 4 deaths.
- As of 24 November 2020, the total number of cases is 3710, including 502 active cases and 3203 cures and 5 deaths.

=== December 2020 ===
- As of 1 December 2020, the total number of cases in Mizoram was 3847, including 343 active cases and 3499 recoveries and 5 persons have died.
- As of 4 December 2020, the total number of cases was 3888, including 235 active cases and 3647 recoveries and 6 fatalities.
- As of 9 December 2020, the total number of cases was 3977, including 199 active cases and 3772 recoveries and 6 deaths.
- As of 18 December 2020, the total number of cases was 4094, including 147 active cases and 3940 recoveries and 7 deaths.
- As of 22 December 2020, the total number of cases was 4133, including 153 active cases and 3973 recoveries and 7 deaths.
- As of 30 December 2020, the total number of cases was 4199, including 100 active cases and 4091 recoveries and 8 deaths.
- As of 31 December 2020, the total number of cases was 4204, including 98 active cases and 4098 recoveries and 8 deaths.

=== January 2021 ===
- As of 1 January 2021, the total number of cases in Mizoram was 4219, including 111 active cases and 4100 recoveries and 8 persons have died.
- As of 6 January 2021, the total number of cases was 4247, including 79 active cases and 4160 recoveries and 8 deaths.
- As of 11 January 2021, the total number of cases was 4293, including 90 active cases and 4194 recoveries and 9 deaths.
- As of 21 January 2021, the total number of cases was 4346, including 63 active cases and 4274 cures and 9 deaths.
- As of 28 January 2021, the total number of cases is 4362, including 42 active cases and 4311 cures and 9 fatalities.

=== February 2021 ===
- As of 1 February 2021, the total number of cases in Mizoram was 4372, including 30 active cases and 4333 recoveries and 9 deaths.
- As of 7 February 2021, the total number of cases was 4382, including 23 active cases and 4350 recoveries and 9 deaths.
- As of 16 February 2021, the total number of cases is 4396, including 18 active cases and 4368 cures and 10 deaths.
- As of 20 February 2021, the total number of cases is 4407, including 20 active cases and 4377 cures and 10 deaths.
- As of 23 February 2021, the total number of cases is 4410, including 21 active cases and 4379 cures and 10 deaths.

=== March 2021 ===
- As of 6 March 2021, the total number of cases in Mizoram was 4428, including 9 active cases and 4409 recoveries and 10 deaths.
- As of 15 March 2021, the total number of cases was 4437, including 10 active cases and 4417 recoveries and 10 deaths.
- As of 30 March 2021, the total number of cases was 4468, including 29 active cases and 4428 cures and 11 deaths.

=== April 2021 ===
- As of 2 April 2021, the total number of cases in Mizoram was 4484, including 37 active cases and 4436 recoveries and 11 deaths.
- As of 9 April 2021, the total number of cases was 4558, including 93 active cases and 4454 recoveries and 11 deaths.
- As of 21 April 2021, the total number of cases is 5085, including 504 active cases and 4569 cures and 12 deaths.

=== May 2021 ===
- As of 9 May 2021, the total number of cases in Mizoram was 7551, including 1951 active cases and 5583 recoveries and 17 deaths.
- As of 11 May 2021, the total number of cases was 7796, including 1854 active cases and 5920 recoveries and 22 fatalities.
- As of 18 May 2021, the total number of cases was 9068, including 1981 active cases and 7058 cures and 29 fatalities.
- As of 25 May 2021, the total number of cases was 10621, including 2481 active cases and 8106 cures and 34 deaths.

=== June 2021 ===
- As of 18 June 2021, the total number of cases in Mizoram was 16437, including 3732 active cases and 12630 recoveries and 75 deaths.
- As of 21 June 2021, the total number of cases was 17605, including 3946 active cases and 13575 cures and 84 deaths.
- As of 23 June 2021, the total number of cases was 18398, including 4216 active cases and 14096 cures and 86 fatalities.

=== July 2021 ===
- As of 13 July 2021, the total number of cases in Mizoram was 24702, including 4629 active cases and 19960 recoveries and 113 deaths.

=== August 2021 ===
- As of 27 August 2021, the total number of cases in Mizoram was 54851, including 6569 active cases and 48080 recoveries and 202 fatalities.
- As of 30 August 2021, the total number of cases was 57962, including 8151 active cases and 49597 recoveries and 214 deaths.

=== September 2021 ===
- As of 23 September 2021, the total number of cases in Mizoram was 82815, including 14346 active cases, 68199 recoveries and 270 fatalities.
- As of 26 September 2021, the total number of cases was 86688, including 15081 active cases, 71321 recoveries and 286 have died from the virus.
- As of 29 September 2021, the total number of cases was 91919, including 16208 active cases, 75405 cures and 306 deaths.

=== Oct to Dec 2021 ===
- As of 7 October 2021, the total number of cases in Mizoram was 101327, including 14779 active cases, 86213 recoveries and 335 deaths.
- As of 24 October 2021, the total number of cases was 117261, including 8943 active cases, 107911 cures and 407 deaths.
- As of 2 November 2021, the total number of cases was 121359, including 6315 active cases, 114612 cures and 432 fatalities.
- As of 4 December 2021, the total number of cases is 136080, including 3620 active cases, 131956 recoveries and 504 fatalities.
- As of 29 December 2021, the total number of cases is 140955, including 1483 active cases, 138931 cures and 541 deaths.

=== Jan to Mar 2022 ===
- As of 9 January 2022, the total number of cases in Mizoram was 145527, including 4407 active cases, 140602 recoveries and 558 deaths.
- As of 15 January 2022, the total number of cases was 152255, including 8921 active cases, 142764 cures and 570 deaths.
- As of 22 January 2022, the total number of cases was 159653, including 9845 active cases, 149227 cures and 581 fatal cases.
- As of 28 January 2022, the total number of cases was 169868, including 14748 active cases, 154663 recoveries and 597 deaths.
- As of 21 February 2022, the total number of cases was 207994, including 9628 active cases, 197720 recoveries and 646 deaths.
- As of 24 February 2022, the total number of cases was 210253, including 8736 active cases, 200867 have cured 650 deaths.
- As of 1 March 2022, the total number of cases was 215356, including 6421 active cases, 208277 recoveries and 658 fatalities.

=== Apr to Jun 2022 ===
- As of 11 April 2022, the total number of cases in Mizoram was 225732, including 828 active cases, 224215 recoveries and 689 deaths.
- As of 18 April 2022, the total number of cases was 226271, including 559 active cases, 225020 cures and 692 deaths.
- As of 1 May 2022, the total number of cases was 227493, including 668 active cases, 226129 recoveries and 696 deaths.
- As of 12 May 2022, the total number of cases was 227849, including 209 active cases, 226943 recoveries and 697 deaths.
- As of 28 May 2022, the total number of cases was 228269, including 160 active cases, 227411 cures and 698 fatal cases.
- As of 9 June 2022, the total number of cases was 228512, including 141 active cases, 227671 recoveries and 700 deaths.
- As of 20 June 2022, the total number of cases was 228751, including 129 active cases, 227921 recoveries and 701 deaths.

=== July to September 2022 ===
- As of 8 July 2022, the total number of cases was 229670, including 525 active cases, 228439 recoveries and 706 deaths.
- As of 30 August 2022, the total number of cases was 236864, including 589 active cases, 235555 recoveries and 720 fatal cases.
- As of 10 September 2022, the total number of cases was 237736, including 317 active cases, 236697 cures and 722 deaths.
- As of 24 September 2022, the total number of cases was 238254, including 175 active cases, 237356 recoveries and 723 deaths.

=== 2023 ===
- As of 22 March 2023, the total number of cases was 238969, including no active case, 238243 recoveries and 726 deaths.

== Testing ==
Mizoram has a COVID-19 sample testing laboratory at Zoram Medical College, it also procured 1,000 testing kits from Assam Medical College. The state government also sanctioned over Rs 2 crore from Chief Minister Relief Fund (CMRF) for the purchase of 10 Trunenat machines.

A TrueNet Laboratory was inaugurated on the ground floor of Serchhip Hospital, Serchhip in the district of Serchhip. The Laboratory, equipped with two RNA extraction, is capable of testing for COVID-19. This is expected to greatly reduce the wait time, as all test samples were previously sent to Zoram Medical College.

The state government has also stated that it has over 7,800 rapid or anti-body test kits for COVID-19 received from the Indian Council of Medical Research (ICMR).

== Migrant workers ==
=== Financial support ===
The Mizoram State Government provided financial assistance of over Rs 1.58 crore to at least 43 Mizo Welfare Associations in various states to assist the stranded people from the state.

=== Transpiration to Home state ===
More than 11,541 students and laborers stranded in different parts of India and abroad have returned to Mizoram. Some of the returnees came by Shramik trains as shown below:

- Shramik Special train carrying 837 people from Chennai & Puducherry reaches Mizoram on 15 May 2020.
- Shramik Special train carrying 1,400 people departed from Bengaluru reached Bairabi railway station.
- Shramik Special train carrying 1,293 people departed from Margao on 29 May on their way to Bairabi railway station, Mizoram.
- Shramik Special train carrying 1,436 people departed from Delhi reached Bairabi railway station on 31 May 2020.
- Shramik Special train departed from Mumbai via Pune on 29 May on their way to Bairabi railway station on 30 May 2020.
- Shramik Special train carrying 475 people departed from Hyderabad on 24 May on their way to Bairabi railway station, Mizoram.

== Impact ==
=== Education ===
The Mizoram government has postponed the opening of school for 2020–21 until the situation stabilizes.

=== Economy ===
More than 1900 youths who have returned from different parts of the country have lost their jobs due to the outbreak of novel coronavirus in Mizoram. Over 40,000 construction workers were provided assistance of Rs 3,000 each by the Mizoram government due to the lockdown.

=== Agriculture ===
Oil palm growers in the state had incurred a loss to the tune of Rs 25-Rs 30 lakh because of absence of market. The growers of other cash crops like ginger, turmeric and sugarcane also faced hardship as they could not harvest their produce.

== COVID-19 Vaccines with Approval for Emergency or Conditional Usage ==
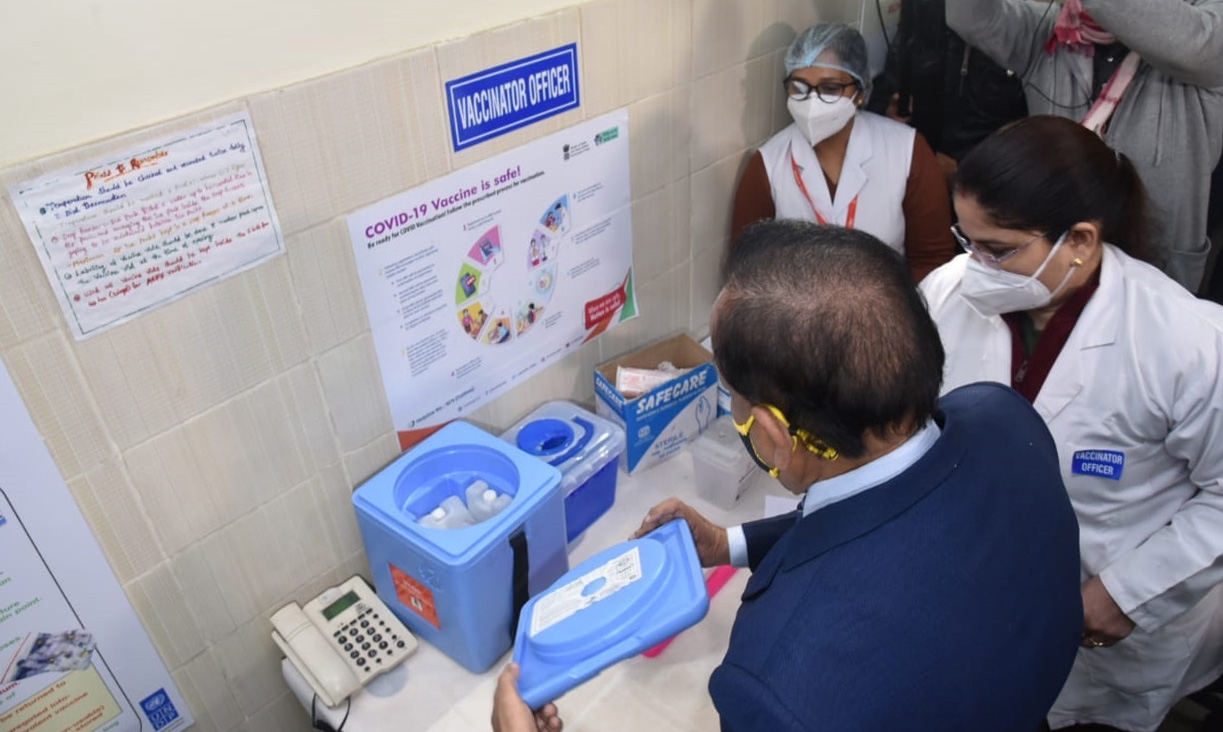
Union Minister for Health & Family Welfare, Dr. Harsh Vardhan visiting the GTB Hospital, Shahdara to review the preparedness of Dry Run of COVID-19 vaccine, in Delhi on January 02, 2021.

=== Covishield ===
On 1 January 2021, the Drug Controller General of India, approved the emergency or conditional use of AstraZeneca's COVID-19 vaccine AZD1222 (marketed as Covishield). Covishield is developed by the University of Oxford and its spin-out company, Vaccitech. It's a viral vector vaccine based on replication-deficient Adenovirus that causes cold in Chimpanzees. It can be stored, transported and handled at normal refrigerated conditions (two-eight degrees Celsius/ 36-46 degrees Fahrenheit). It has a shelf-life of at least six months.

On 12 January 2021 first batches of Covishield vaccine was despatched from the Serum Institute of India.

=== Covaxin ===
On 2 January 2021, BBV152 (marketed as Covaxin), first indigenous vaccine, developed by Bharat Biotech in association with the Indian Council of Medical Research and National Institute of Virology received approval from the Drug Controller General of India for its emergency or conditional usage.

On 14 January 2021 first batches of Covaxin vaccine was despatched from the Bharat Biotech, albeit it was still in the third phase of testing.

=== Others ===
On 19 May 2021, Dr Reddy's Labs received Emergency Use Authorisation for anti-COVID drug 2-DG. On 21 February 2022, Drugs Controller General of India granted approval to Biological E's COVID-19 vaccine Corbevax, that can be used for children between 12 and 18 years of age.

On 21 October 2021, India completed administering of one billion Covid vaccines in the country.

On 8 January 2022, India crossed 1.5 billion Covid vaccines milestone in the country.

On 19 February 2022, India crossed 1.75 billion Covid vaccines milestone in the country.

== See also ==
- COVID-19 pandemic in India
- COVID-19 pandemic
