= Lunglei Municipal Council =

Local civic body in Lunglei, Mizoram, India

Type
- Type: Municipal Council
- Term limits: 5 years

Leadership
- Chairman: Lalzuithanga, ZPM
- Vice Chairman: K Lalrinawma, ZPM

Structure
- Seats: 11 Councillors
- Political groups: Government (11): ZPM (11)

Elections
- Last election: March 2023
- Next election: 2028

Meeting place
- Lunglei, Mizoram

The Lunglei Municipal Council is the municipal body which governs and maintains the town of Lunglei in the Indian state of Mizoram. Lunglei is the second populous urban settlement in the state after the Capital city of Aizawl.

== History ==
The Municipal Council creation was a long pressing demand of the people of Lunglei. In 2022, Mizoram State cabinet approved creation of Lunglei Municipal Council and on 2023, the council was formed. The state government allocated Rs 80 lakh for the creation of the proposed Lunglei Municipal Council in the 2022-2023 annual budget.

== Election ==
First election to the council was held on 2023, where Zoram People's Movement won all 11 seats against the ruling Mizo National Front.

== See also ==
- Sinlung Hills Council
