= Lunglei =

Lunglei Lungleh
- Town
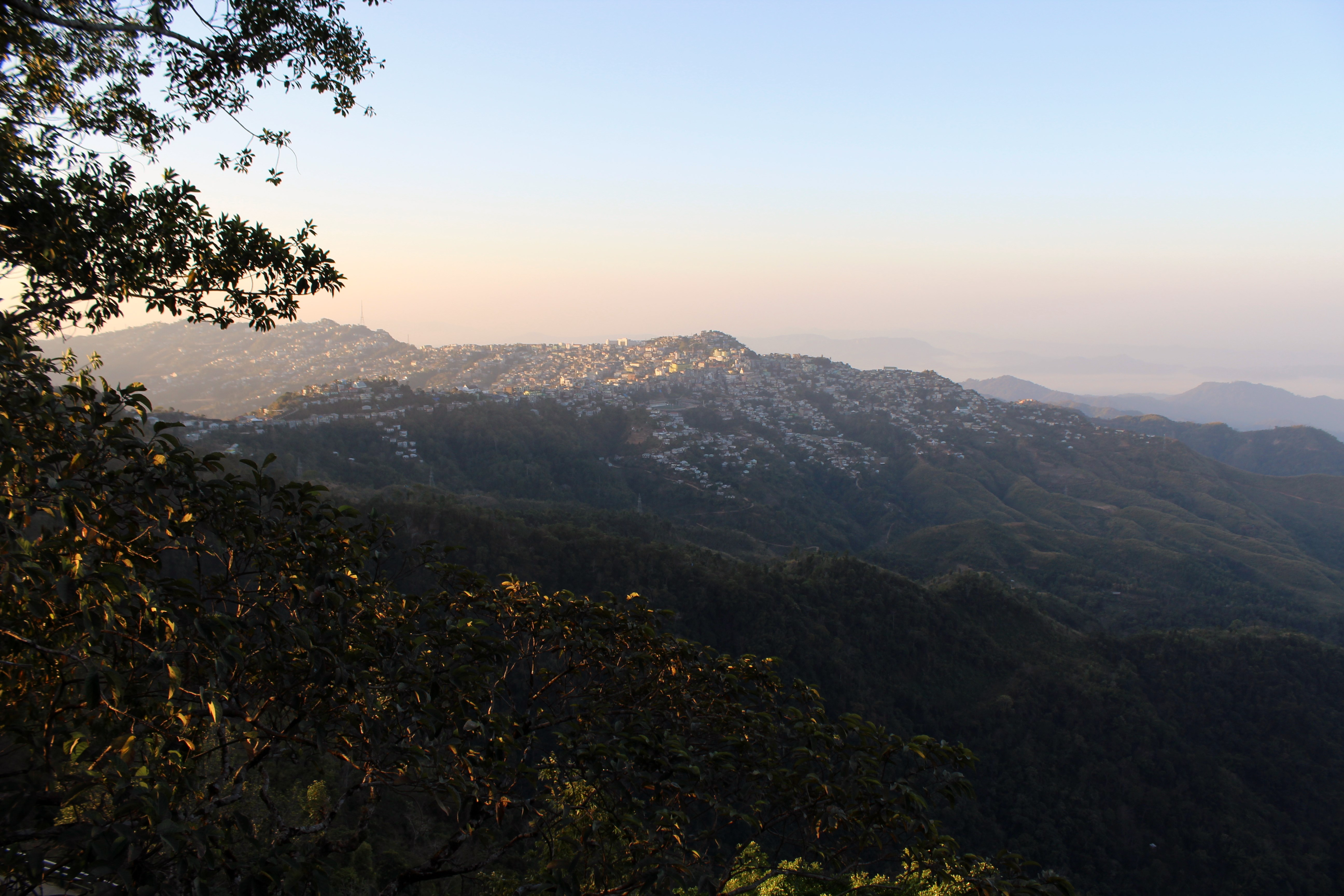
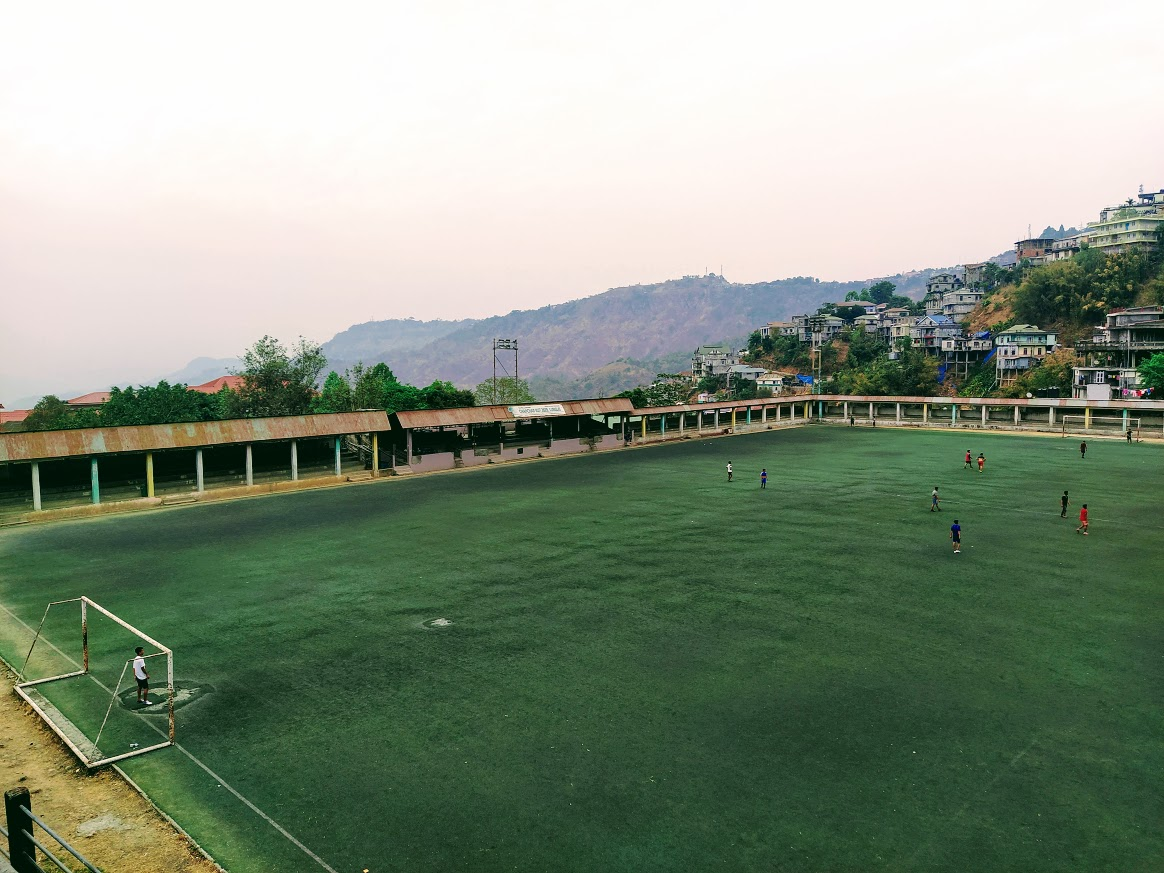
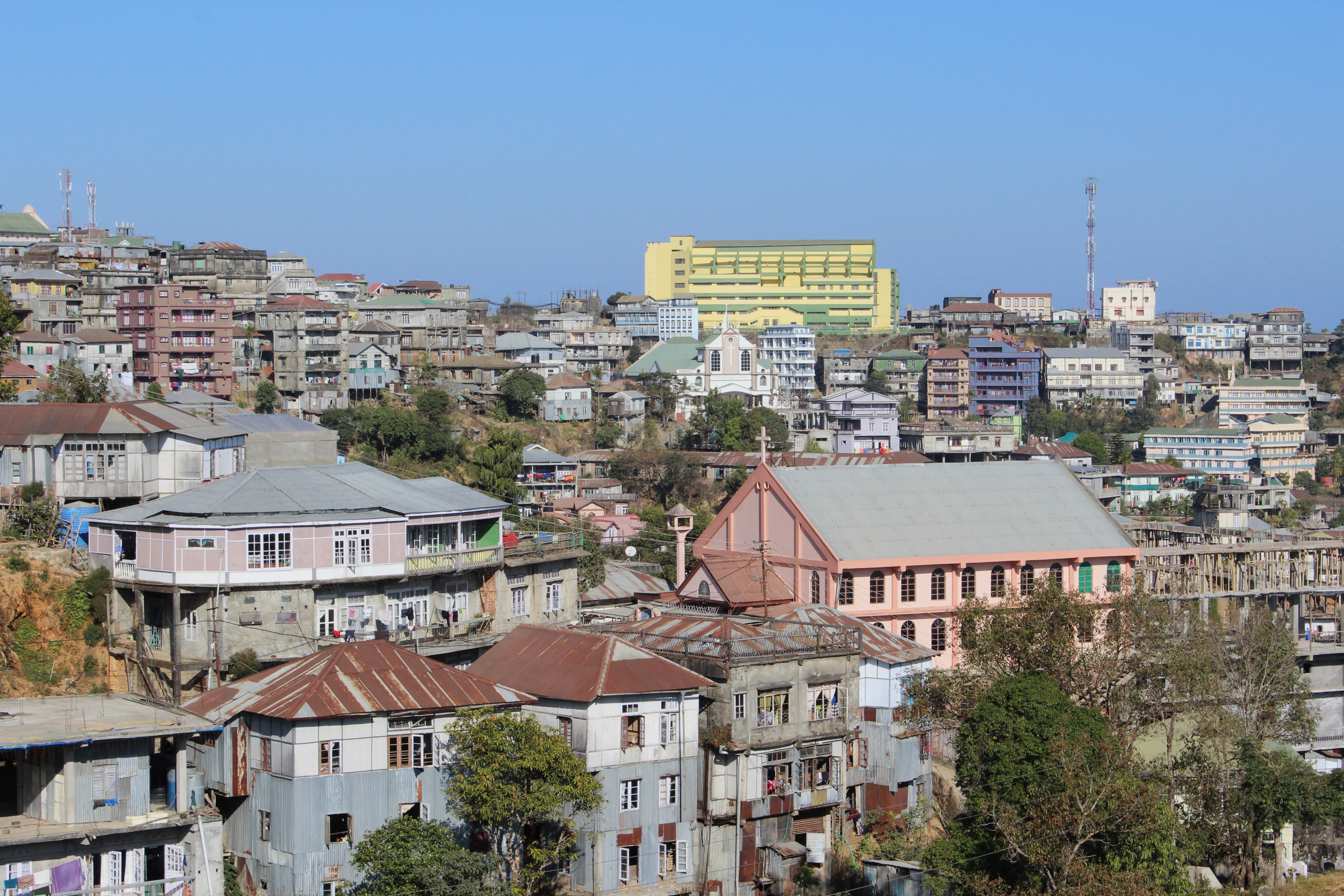
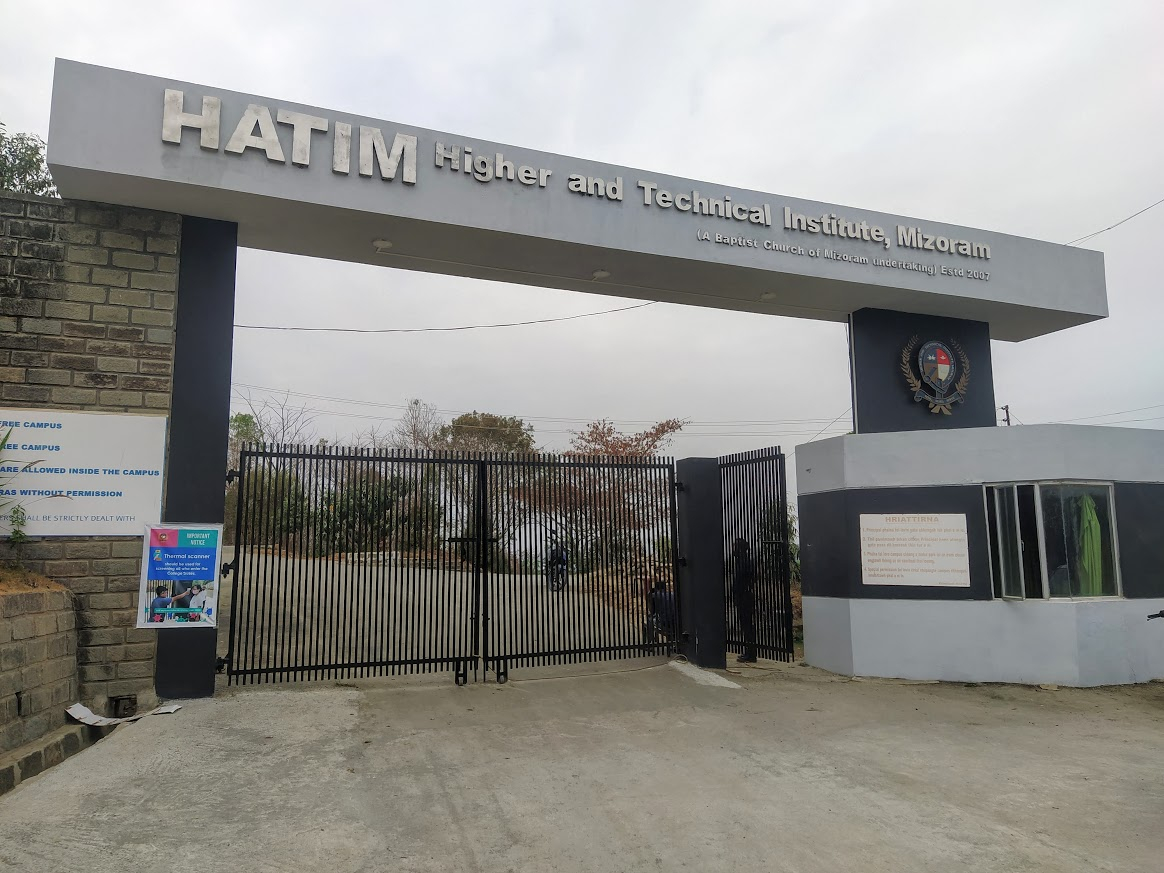
- Clockwise from top: aerial view of Lunglei, Thuamluaia Ground, houses in Lunglei, Higher and Technical Institute of Mizoram (HATIM)
- Nickname: Leitlangpui
- Location within Mizoram Location within India
- Coordinates: 22.88°N 92.73°E
- Country: India
- State: Mizoram
- District: Lunglei

Government
  - Body: Lunglei Municipal Council

Area
  - Total: 25 km^{2} (9.7 sq mi)
- Elevation: 1,222 m (4,009 ft)

Population (2023)
  - Total: 157,000
  - Rank: 2nd in Mizoram
  - Density: 6,300/km^{2} (16,000/sq mi)

Languages
  - Official: Mizo
- Time zone: UTC+5:30 (IST)
- PIN: 796701
- Vehicle registration: MZ-02
- Climate: Cwa
- Website: mizoram.nic.in

Lunglei (/ˈlʌŋleɪ/, locally /lʊŋˈleɪ/), formerly rendered Lungleh, is the second-largest town in Mizoram, northeastern India, situated in the south-central part of the state. The town served as the capital of British South Lushai Hills from 1889 to 1898. It is situated 729 metres (2,392 feet) above sea level, on a ridge surrounded by hills. As of 2023, the town has an estimated population of 157,000.

== History ==
Lunglei (Some pronounce as Lungleh). Lunglei which means "Bridge of Stone", was the capital of South Lushai Hills for 10 years from 1880, as was Aijal for the North Lushai Hills. The two were united in 1898. Lunglei is the largest town in Mizoram and was an important town until the partition of India as it had direct access to Chittagong, a big city in Bangladesh which made Lunglei the commercial and education centre. As of 1912, there were only 2 shops in Lunglei which increased to 4 shops in 1922. The first Jeepable road to Lunglei was made only in the 1950s. on 1 March 1966, the MNF declared unilateral Mizo Independence and attacked Assam Rifles post at Lunglei, captured the SDO and seized Rs 18 Lakhs from the Govt Treasury.

== Geography ==
Lunglei is located at 22.88°N 92.73°E.

== Demographics ==
Lunglei is one of the prominent districts of Mizoram. Encompassing a total area of 4,538 square kilometres (1,752 mi^{2}), the district of Lunglei has a population of 137,155. The district of Lunglei is 235 kilometres (146 mi) from Aizawl, the capital of Mizoram and is easily accessible by well maintained roads. The district is bounded on the north by Mamit and Aizawl districts, on the west by Bangladesh, on the south by Lawngtlai district, on the southeast by Saiha district, on the east by Myanmar and on the northeast by Champhai district. As of the 2011 Census of India,

== Administration ==
The district of Lunglei has been further divided into major sub divisions of Hnahthial SDO (S), Lunglei SDO (S) and Tlabung SDO (S) and 4 R.D. Blocks, Bunghmun, Hnahthial, Lunglei and Lungsen. The district has 7 assembly constituencies. These are South Tuipui, Lunglei North, Lunglei East, Lunglei West, Lunglei South, Thorang and West Tuipui for the administrative convenience of the district officials. Lunglei town is the administrative headquarters of the district.

The Lunglei town is managed by Lunglei Municipal Council.

== Education ==
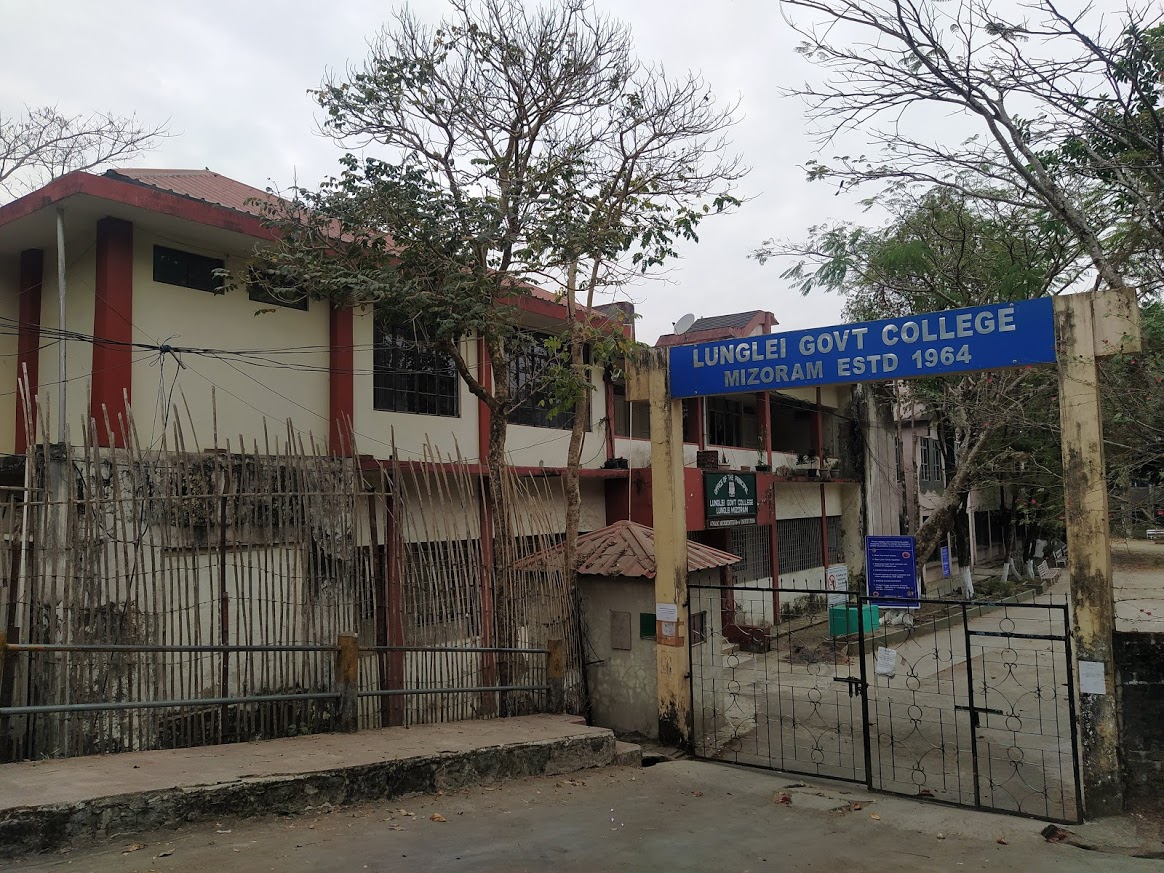
Lunglei Government College Entrance

The Major Educational Institutions of Higher Learning in Lunglei are:

- Lunglei Government College, Lunglei
- J.Buana College, Lunglei
- Kapthangi College Lunglei. Electric Veng
- Higher and Technical Institute of Mizoram
- Mizoram Polytechnic offering Engineering diploma courses.
- Lunglei Nursing College
- Christian Hospital Serkawn Nursing College
- Mizoram Engineering College
- District Institute of Education and Training (DIET)

== Tourism ==
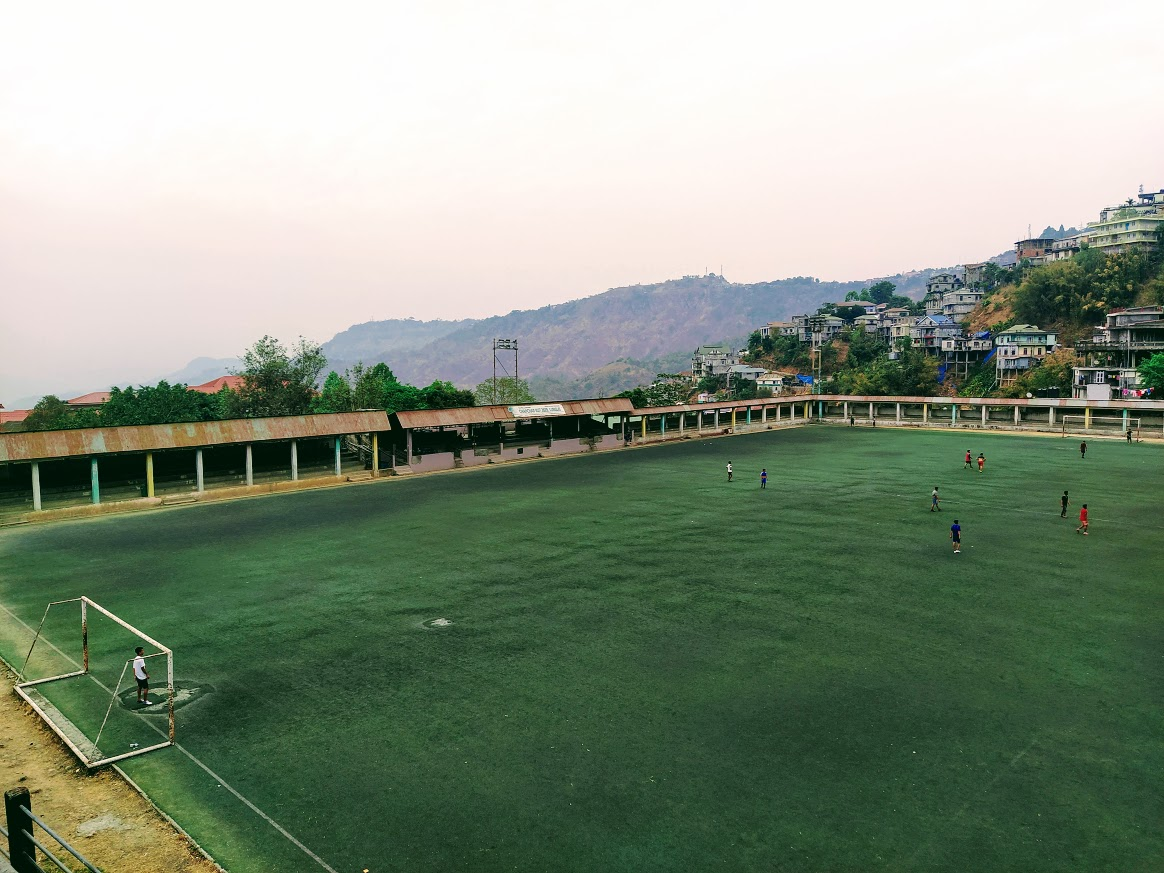
Thuamluaia Mual football ground

Some of the notable tourist spots of the district of Lunglei are:

- Zobawk Sports Academy
- Kawmzawl Park
- Khawnglung Wildlife Sanctuary
- Saikuti Hall where most of the concerts and celebrations are held. A unique museum has also been established in the hall where local painters demonstrate their skill and exhibit their works.
- Thuamluaia Mual - is the second football stadium with Artificial turf in Mizoram.

== Media ==
=== Newspapers ===
- Hnamdamna
- Zochhiar
- Lunglei Times
- Daifim
- Ralvengtu
- Vulmawi
- Lunglei Tribune
- MAKEDONIA (Sunday)
- Daily Post
- Zunzam

== Transport ==
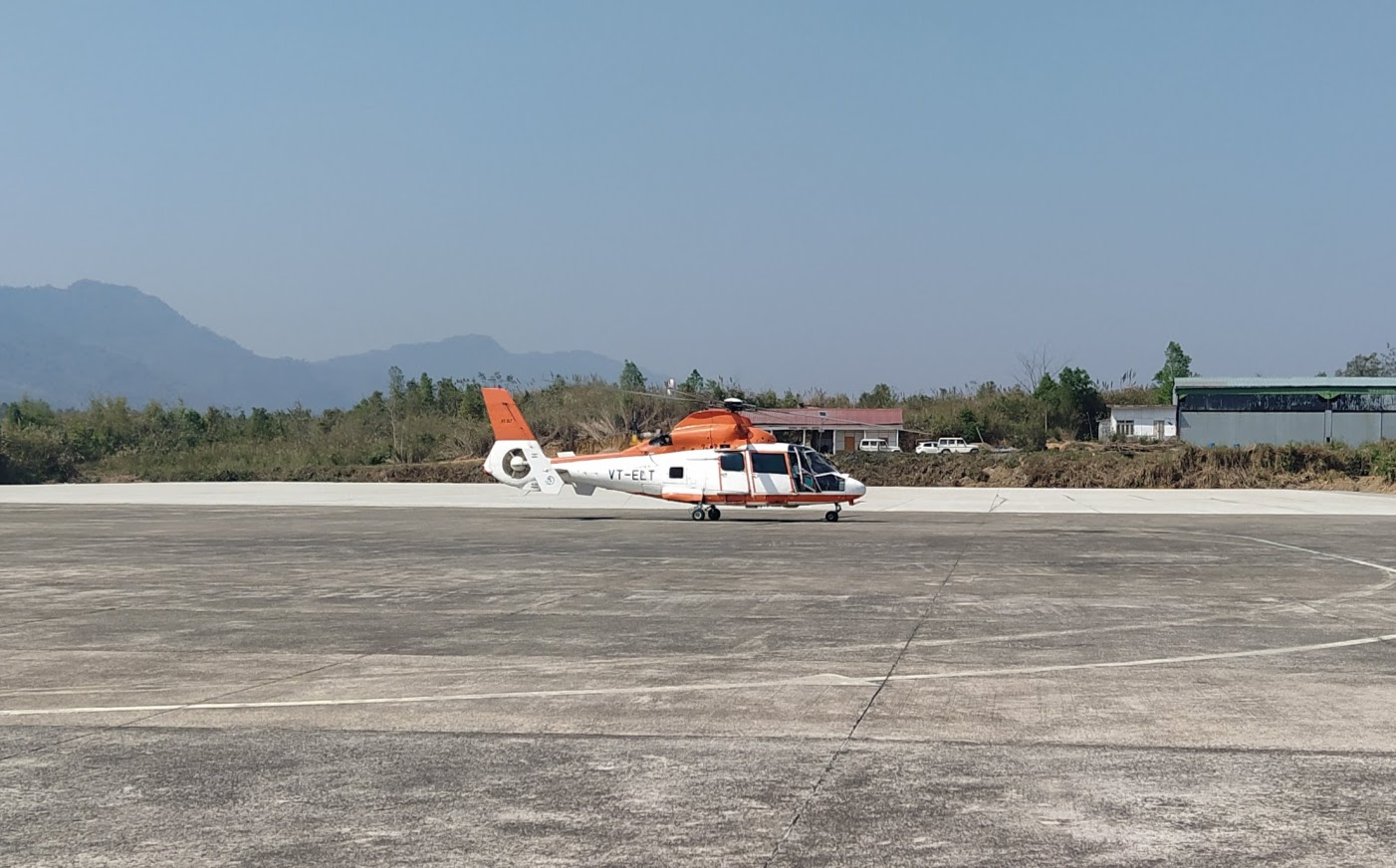
Pawan hans Helicopter Mizoram

The closest route to Lunglei in the 1890s was through Tlabung, a town about 35 kilometers from Lunglei where Karnaphuli River connects to Chittagong, a distance of about 90 kilometers. In the 1940s, a trip from Lunglei to Shillong or Kolkata passed through Chittagong rather than Aizawl.

A Helicopter service by Pawan Hans has been started between Aizawl and Lunglei. The distance between Lunglei and Aizawl is less than 200 kilometres (120 mi), and the cities are connected by regular service of buses and jeeps. There are also plans to construct a small airport at Kawmzawl, about 25 kilometres (16 mi) from Lunglei.
