= Regional Institute of Paramedical and Nursing Sciences =

Coordinates: 23.7292°N 92.7510°E

Regional Institute of Paramedical and Nursing Sciences, Aizawl
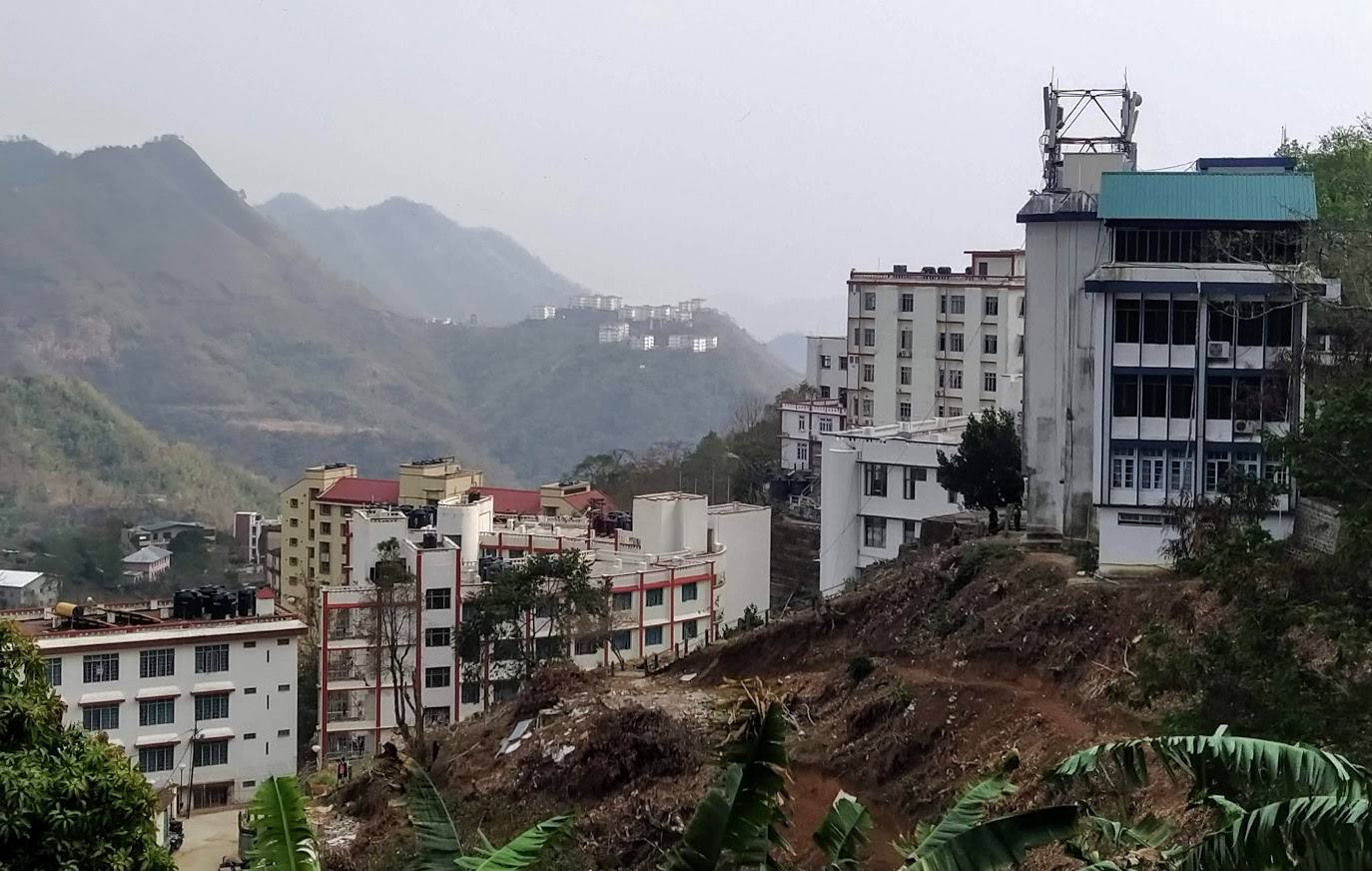
- RIPANS Campus
- Motto: To Serve with Dedication
- Type: College
- Established: 1994; 32 years ago
- Academic affiliations: Mizoram University
- Endowment: ₹135 crore (US$14 million)(2025–26 est.)
- Director: Dr. Sanjay D. Sawant
- Location: Aizawl, Mizoram, India
- Campus: Urban
- Website: ripans.ac.in

Regional Institute of Paramedical and Nursing Sciences (RIPANS) is an institute of technology located at Zemabawk, Aizawl, Mizoram, India. It offers technical courses related to medicine and its jurisdiction covers the whole northeast India. Managed under the Ministry of Health and Family Welfare, Government of India, it is the only federal ministry-run technical institute in northeast India.

== History ==
To overcome the need to provide basic paramedical health care facilities in the health institution of the northeastern regions, the proposal for Regional Institute of Paramedical and Nursing Sciences was finalized by the North Eastern Council in 1992-93 with the approval of the government of India. The institute was officially launched on 30 March 1995. All the allotted seats in disciplines of the institute are distributed as per quota fixed for to the beneficiary states. RIPANS was established at project cost of Rs. 2315.39 lakhs during the 9th Five Year Plan. It became the first technical institute in applied medicine in Mizoram.

Formerly, the name was Regional Paramedical and Nursing Training Institute (RP&NTI), which was rechristened as Regional Institute of Paramedical and Nursing (RIPAN). Later, the word 'sciences' was added. The institute is named Regional Institute of Paramedical and Nursing Sciences (RIPANS). RIPANS is affiliated to Mizoram University. RIPANS is planning to start a 100-seat MBBS and BDS seat learning center, for which a project estimate has been submitted. On 1 April 2007, the management was taken over by the Ministry of Health and Family Welfare, government of India, and became the only federal ministry-run technical institute in northeast India.

Although the institute is meant for northeast India, it also provides enrolment from Jammu and Kashmir. The degrees are affiliated to the Mizoram University.

== Courses ==
RIPANS offers seven coursed such as nursing, pharmacy, radio imaging technology, medical laboratory science, optometry, physiotherapy and nutrition and diatetics. Under these departments, the following degrees are offered:

1. B.Sc. in Nursing
2. Bachelor's in Pharmacy
3. B.Sc. in Medical Lab Technology(B.Sc.MLT/BMLS)
4. Bachelor's in Optometry & Ophthalmic Techniques
5. Bachelor's in Radiography & Imaging Technology
6. PG Diploma in Nutrition & Dietetics
7. Master in Pharmacy
8. M.Sc. in MLT/MMLS (Medical Microbiology, Pathology, Medical Biochemistry and Blood Banking & Hematology specializations)
9. Master in Medical Radiology & Imaging Technology (MMRIT) [CT Scan, MRI, Breast Imaging (Mammography)]
10. PhD in Pharmacy

M. Pharm courses were started in 2014, with degrees such as M.Pharm in Pharmaceutics, Pharmacology, Pharmaceutical Chemistry, Pharmacognosy. M.Sc. MLT specializations were also started in the year 2021.
