= ICFAI University, Mizoram =

Private university in Mizoram, India

Coordinates: 23.801°N 92.728°E

Institute of Chartered Financial Analysts of India University, Mizoram
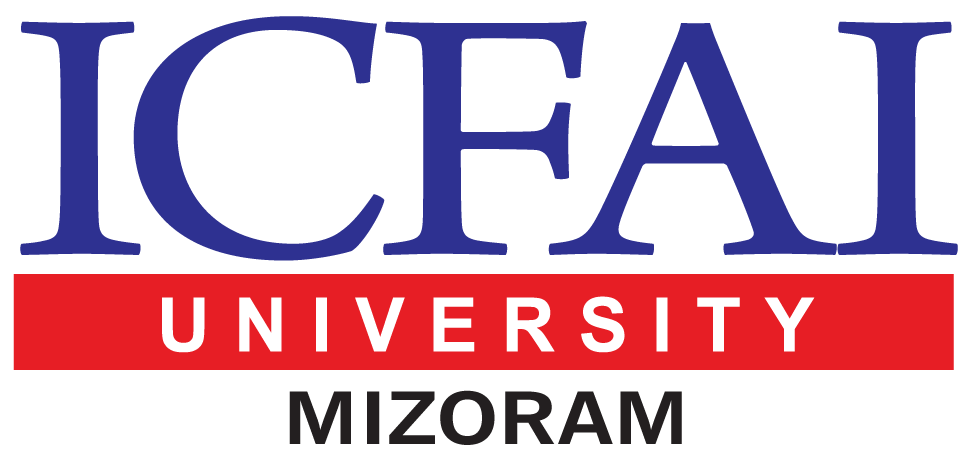
- Type: non profit University
- Established: 2006; 20 years ago
- Affiliations: UGC; AIU; ACU
- Chancellor: Dr. Y. R. Haragopal Reddy
- Vice-Chancellor: Dr. Ginlianlal Buhril
- Location: Aizawl, Mizoram, India
- Campus: Urban
- Website: www.iumizoram.edu.in

ICFAI University, Mizoram (IUM or The Institute of Chartered Financial Analysts of India University, Mizoram) is a university in Aizawl, Mizoram, India. It was established through an Act of the State Legislature of Mizoram and is recognized by the UGC under Section 2(f) of the UGC Act and achieved recognition for its academic delivery and industry-institute interface.

== Location ==
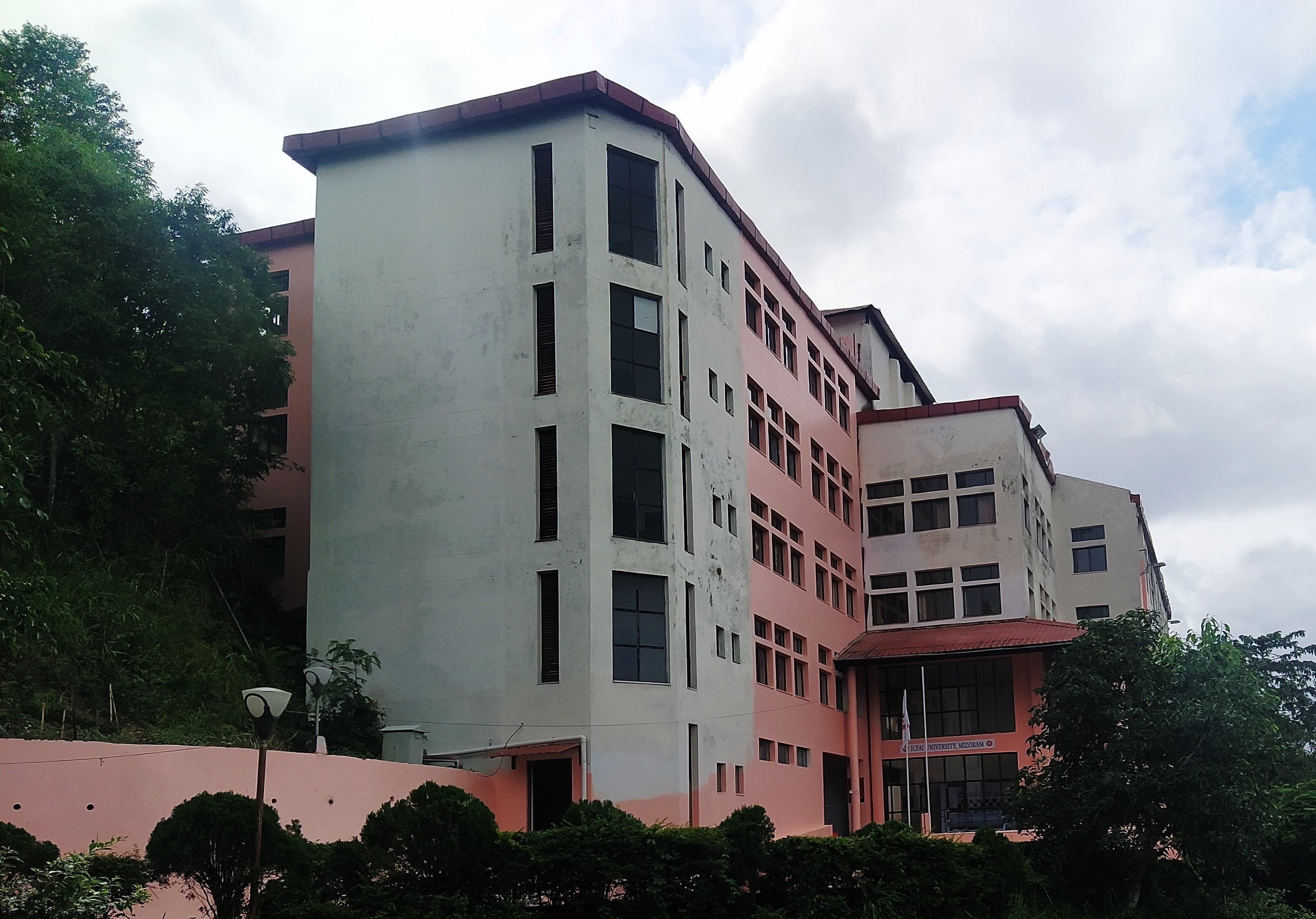
ICFAI University Mizoram Building

The university is located in Durtlang, the suburb of Aizawl, capital of Mizoram. It was established in 2006 with campus in Aizawl. The campus is 17.58 Acres.

== History ==
The university was established under the provisions of the Institute of Chartered Financial Analysts of India University, Mizoram Act 2006, (Act No. 4 of 2006), vide Notification No. B.12012/2/2006-EDC, dated 19.10.2006. It is sponsored by the Institute of Chartered Financial Analysts of India, a not-for-profit educational society established in 1984 under the Andhra Pradesh (Telangana Area) Public Societies Registration Act, 1350 F (Act No.1 of 1350F) with the objective of imparting training in finance and management to students, working executives and professionals in India.

== Departments ==
The university offers the following full-time programs at Aizawl, Mizoram.

1. Management – BBA and MBA
2. Computer Science – BCA
3. Hotel Management - BHTM

The university has recently opened post graduate studies in Social Work, Economics, English, Political Science, Business Administration, Commerce, History and Geography.
