= Zoram Medical College =

Medical college in Mizoram, India

Coordinates: 23°37′23.1″N 92°43′41.6″E

Zoram Medical College and Hospital
- Former names: Mizoram Institute of Medical Education & Research
- Motto: Learn and Serve
- Type: Medical Education; Research institute
- Established: August 7, 2018; 7 years ago
- Affiliations: Mizoram University; NMC
- Director: Dr. Zoramthara Zadeng
- Undergraduates: 100
- Location: Falkawn, Mizoram, India
- Campus: Semi Urban
- Website: zmc.edu.in

Zoram Medical College and Hospital previously known as Mizoram Institute of Medical Education & Research is the first medical college in Mizoram, India. It was inaugurated on 7 August 2018 by the then CM of Mizoram, Lal Thanhawla, at Falkawn, about 16 km (9.9 mi) from Aizawl, Mizoram. ZMC is expected to meet the growing demand of Doctors in Mizoram.

== History ==
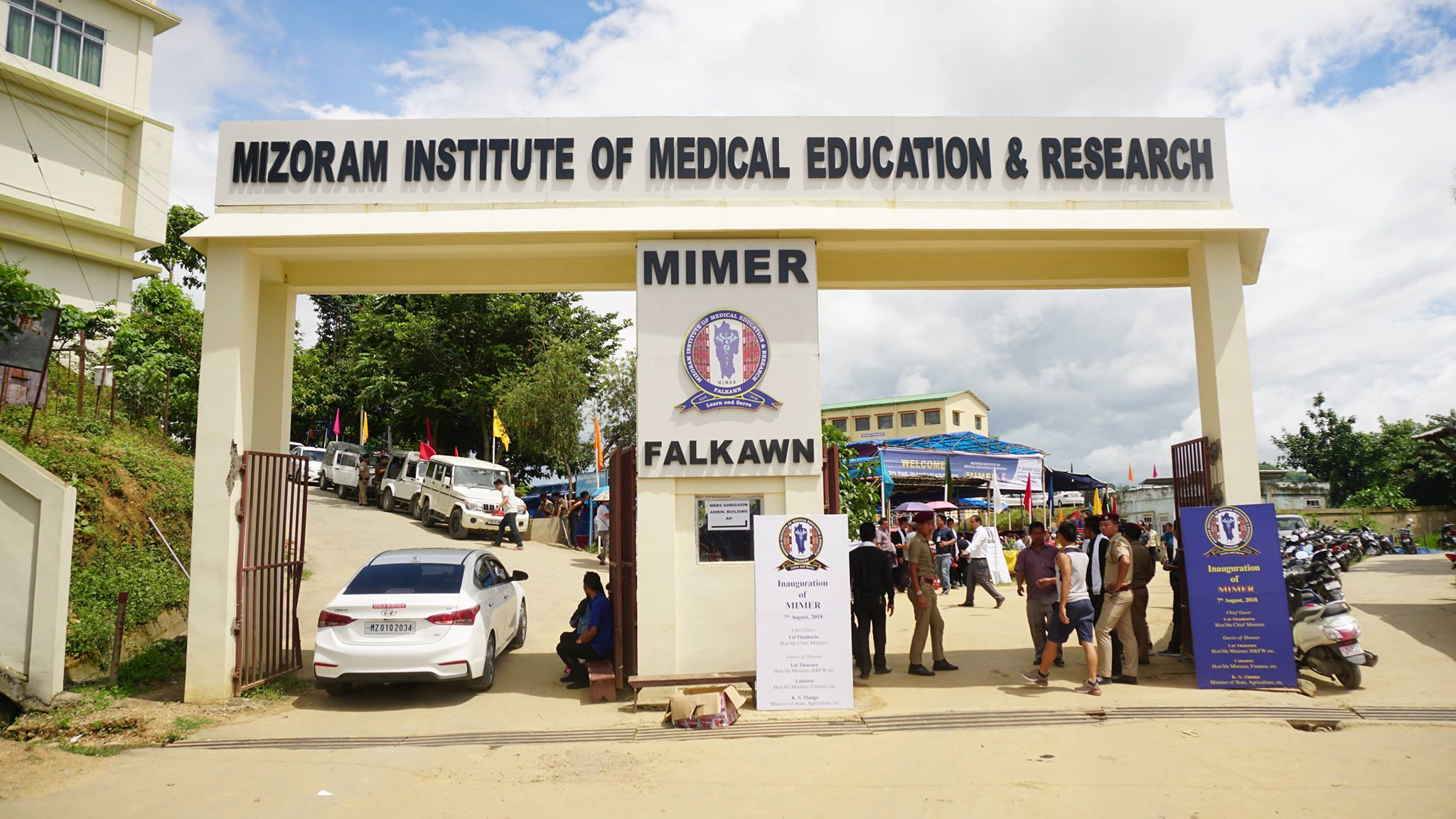
ZMC Entrance

Construction work on the State Referral Hospital started in 1999 with funds from the Planning Commission, following approval of Rs. 40 crore for the proposal in 1996. The State Referral Hospital was initially planned for a 300 Bedded Hospital but had to start as a 50 bedded hospital in the Administrative Building from 21 July 2005 because the then Mizo National Front government deviated from original plan in executing construction. Subsequently, it was enlarged to 150 beds on 10 Dec 2012. MIMER was established by the Government of Mizoram under the Centrally Sponsored Scheme 'Establishment of new Medical Colleges attached with existing district/referral hospitals' with a project cost of Rs. 189 lakhs and funding pattern 90:10.

Prof. Lallukhum Fimate was appointed as the first director of the college on 27 October, 2017.

Permission to start MBBS courses was given on 25 May 2018 by the Ministry of Health and Family Welfare, Government of India on the recommendation of the National Medical Commission. It was inaugurated on 7 August 2018 by Lalthanhawla, the Chief Minister of Mizoram.

It was renamed to Zoram Medical College on 26 April 2019 as per the decision of the Council of Ministers, Government of Mizoram.

== Admissions ==
Students are admitted through the Higher & Technical Education Department, Government of Mizoram on the basis of National Eligibility and Entrance Test (NEET) scores. Total number of students admitted per year is 100, with 15% of seats reserved for All India Quota, 15% seats for NRI Quota and 70% of seats reserved for the State Quota.

== Courses ==
The college offers MBBS course which is affiliated to Mizoram University under permission of the Board of Governors in supersession of the National Medical Commission.

The college also offers a two year Master of Public Health program and recently introduced Post Graduate Speciality Programs (MD/MS) in five clinical streams i.e. Anaesthesiology ,Paediatrics,General Surgery ,General Medicine and Obs and Gynaecology from the year 2025 onwards

== Departments ==
1. Anatomy
2. Physiology
3. Biochemistry
4. Pharmacology
5. Pathology
6. Microbiology
7. General Surgery
8. General Medicine
9. Oto-rhino-laryngology
10. Ophthalmology
11. Obstetrics & Gynecology
12. Community Medicine
13. Forensic Medicine
14. Pediatrics
15. TB & Respiratory Diseases
16. Dermatology & Venereology
17. Radio-diagnosis
18. Psychiatry
19. Dentistry
20. Anesthesiology
21. Orthopedics

== Location ==
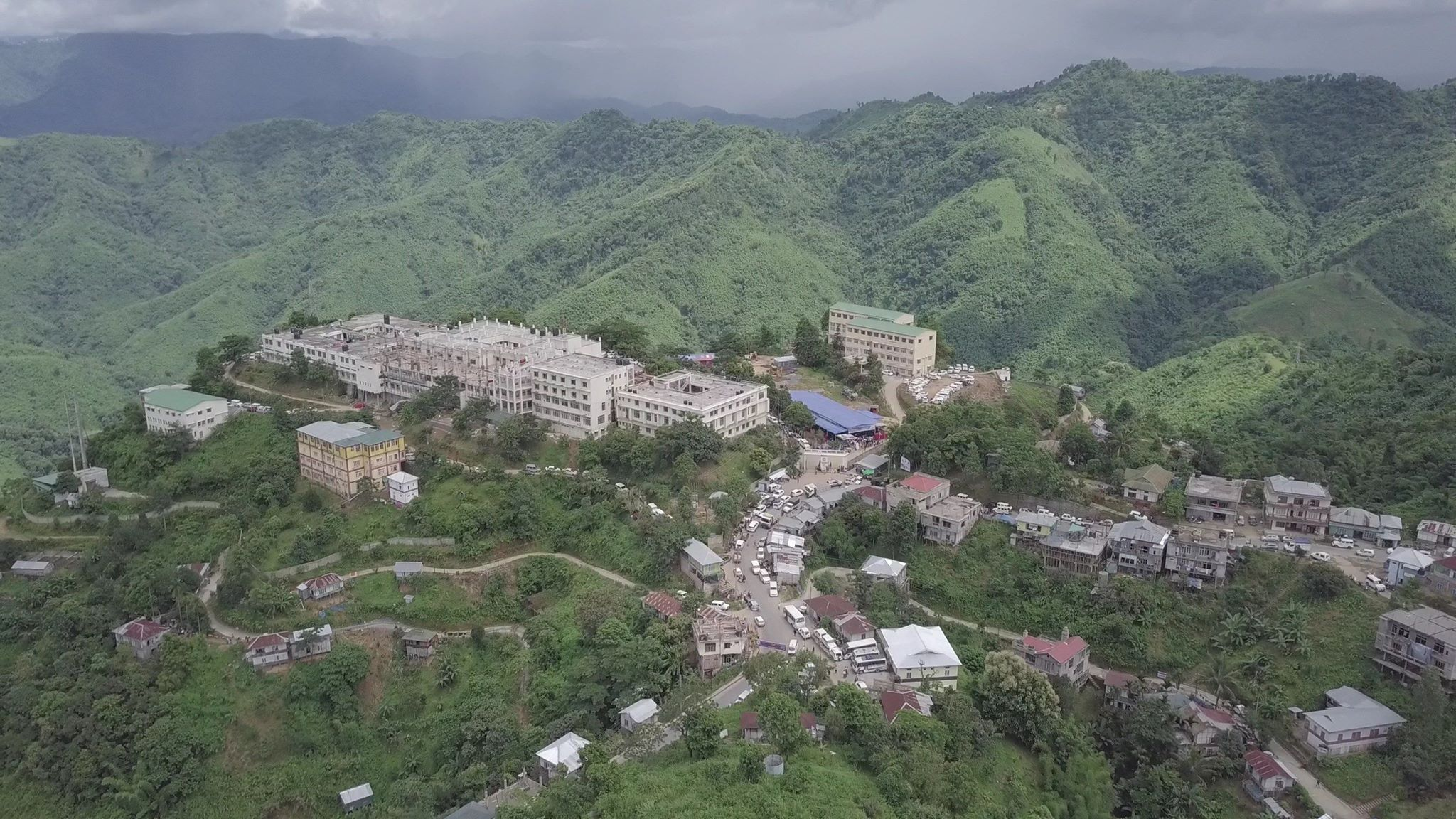
ZMC with surrounding areas of campus

The Medical College is located on a campus at Falkawn on the outskirts of Aizawl, about 16 km from Aizawl city and takes about 41 minutes to drive.
