= Mizoram University =

Central university in Aizawl, Mizoram, India

- Logo of Mizoram University
- Other name: MZU
- Motto: Greater Deeds Remain
- Type: Central University
- Established: 2 July 2001 (25 years ago)
- Accreditation: NAAC (A+)
- Affiliations: UGC; NAAC; AIU
- Endowment: ₹260 Crore (2025)
- Vice-Chancellor: Dibakar Chandra Deka
- Rector: Governor of Mizoram
- Visitor: President of India
- Academic staff: 118
- Administrative staff: 164
- Students: 6,235+ (2025)
- Location: Aizawl, Mizoram, 796004, India; 23°44′22″N 92°39′54″E
- Campus: Rural, 978 acres (396 ha)
- Language: English
- Website: mzu.edu.in

Mizoram University (MZU) is a central university at Tanhril on the outskirts of Aizawl, the capital of Mizoram, India. It was established under the Mizoram University Act (No. 8 of 2000) passed by the Parliament of India and began operations on 2 July 2001. The President of India is the official Visitor, and the Governor of Mizoram acts as Chief Rector. The university replaced a campus of North-Eastern Hill University (NEHU), which had until then been the principal institution for higher education in the state.

== History ==
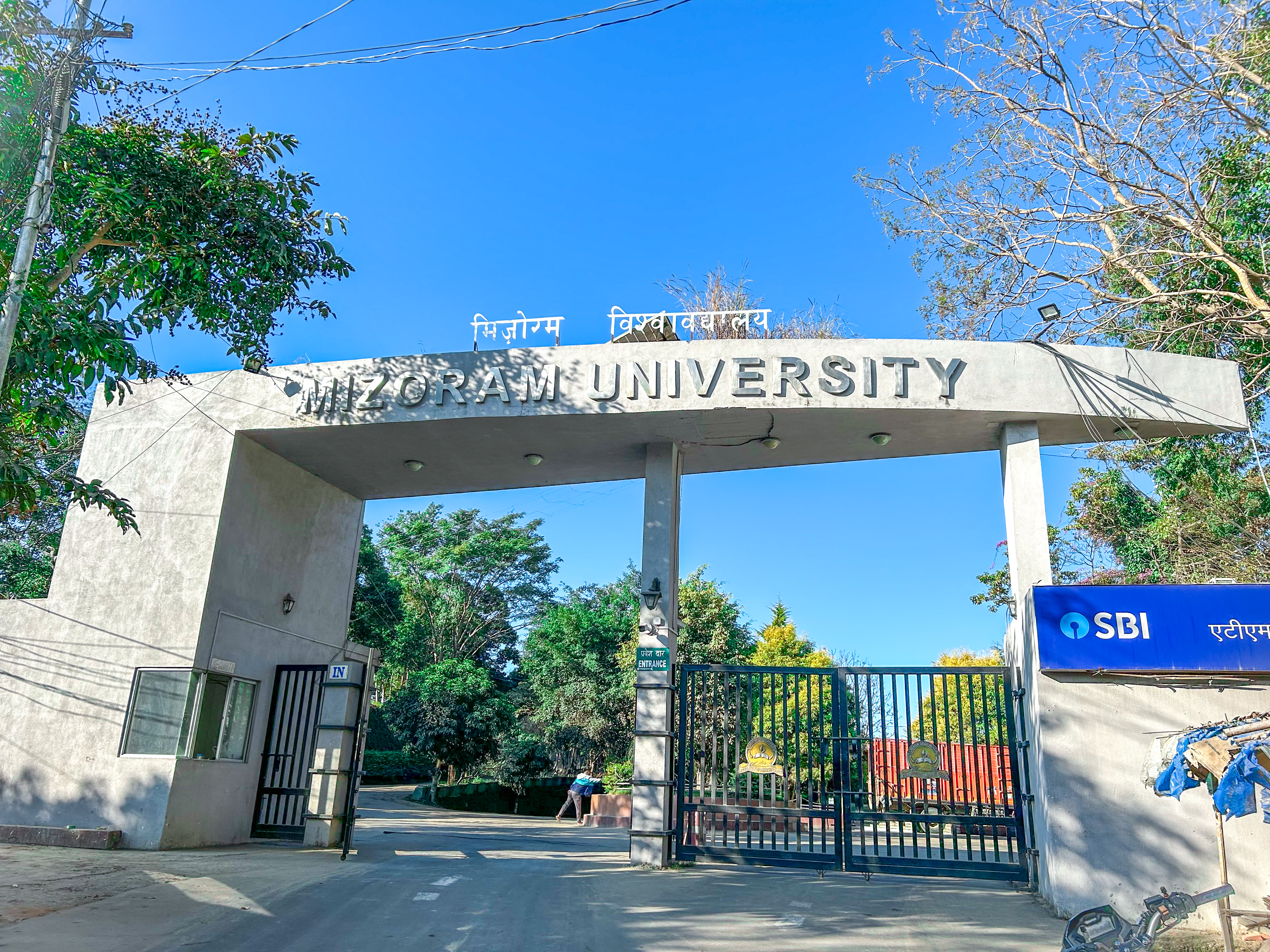
The main gate of Mizoram University at Tanhril, Aizawl

The creation of Mizoram University is rooted in the political settlement that ended two decades of armed conflict in Mizoram. The Mizo Accord, a tripartite agreement signed on 30 June 1986 between the Government of India, the Government of Mizoram, and the Mizo National Front (MNF) under Laldenga, concluded an insurgency that had begun in 1966 and included a provision permitting the state to pursue the establishment of its own university. The accord is widely described as the only insurgency in post-independence India brought to a close through negotiation alone, though analysts have argued that durable peace in Mizoram owes as much to the social and administrative structures of Mizo civil society as to the text of the settlement itself.

Before 2001, higher education in Mizoram was administered through a NEHU campus operating from Shillong since 1978, which covered seven postgraduate departments: Economics, Education, English, Forestry, Mizo, Psychology, and Public Administration. On becoming operational, Mizoram University absorbed all NEHU functions in the state. For over two decades prior to the move to its permanent campus at Tanhril, the institution had operated out of rented premises scattered across Aizawl.

=== Future direction ===
In March 2025, the Mizoram Legislative Assembly unanimously passed the Mizoram State University Bill, 2025, to create the state's first government-run university. Higher and Technical Education Minister Vanlalthlana, who introduced the bill, stated that under the National Education Policy (NEP) 2020 framework, Mizoram University is expected to transition into a research-intensive institution by 2035, after which it would no longer be able to grant affiliation to the state's 21 colleges. The incoming state university, structured on a cluster model incorporating existing colleges, would absorb affiliation responsibilities and expand postgraduate capacity that MZU presently cannot accommodate. The structural implications of the bill for MZU and the state's colleges were analysed at length in the Mizo-language daily Vanglaini, the state's leading newspaper, which argued that the NEP's mandatory affiliation reform timeline makes a separate state university structurally necessary regardless of MZU's eventual research classification.

== Campus ==
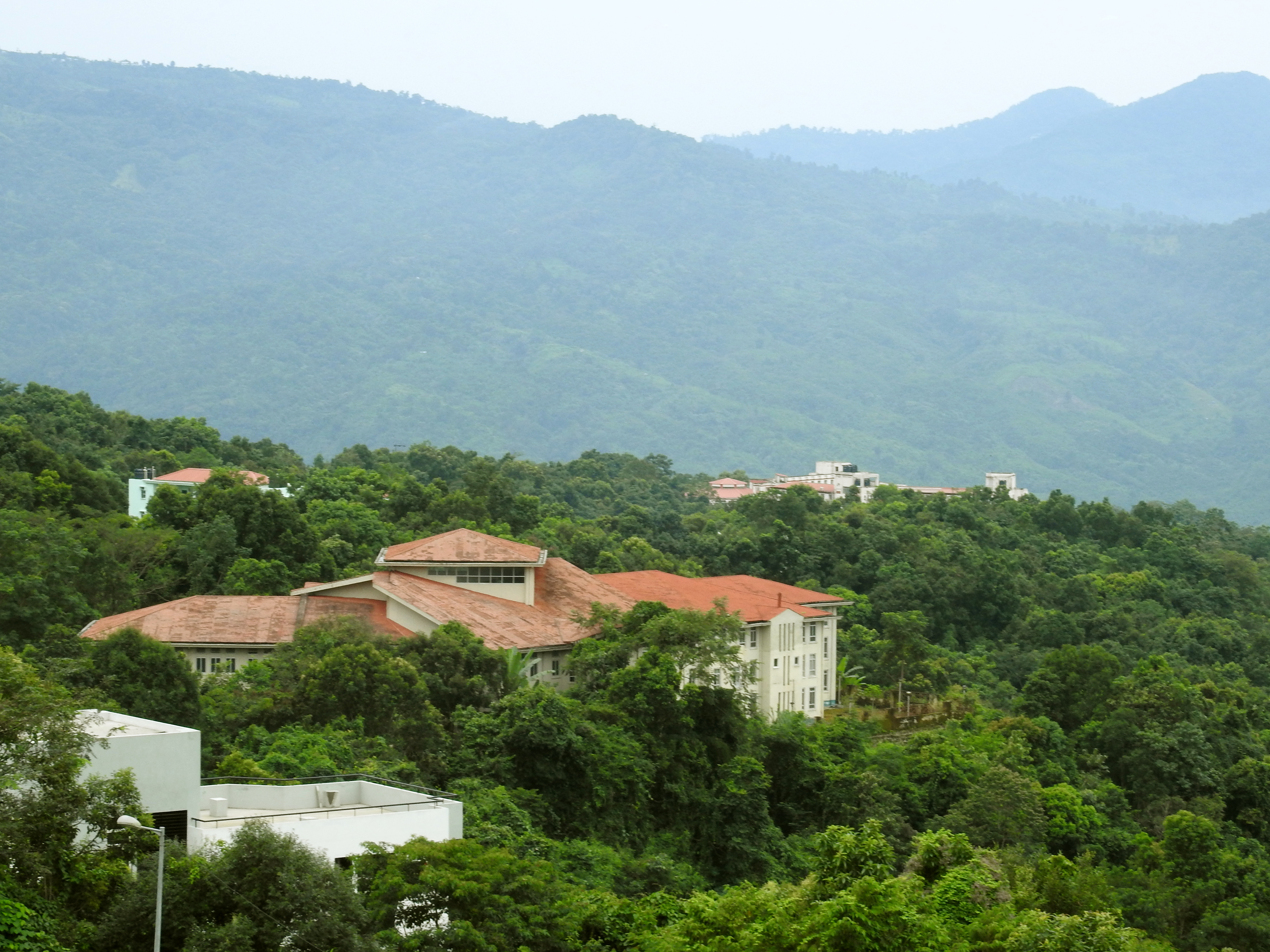
Mizoram University campus viewed from within the surrounding tropical forests at Tanhril

The Tanhril campus covers approximately 978 acres (396 ha) of forested hillside around an hour's drive from central Aizawl. It contains regenerating tropical wet evergreen and semi-evergreen forests, a protected forested water catchment reserve in the north, and a small biodiversity park maintained by the Department of Environmental Science for field research on biodiversity conservation.

Several streams run through the campus. Setlak Lui (lui meaning river in Mizo) flows along the main valley and is joined by Rultawi Lui, Hratdawng Lui, Lalmangkhawng Lui, and Lungsumzau Lui; these drain north-west toward the Tlawng River.

The campus received a Grade 'A' rating from the Mizoram State Pollution Control Board following a Green Audit in 2013. It was among the earliest universities in India to power its academic buildings, hostels, administrative blocks, and campus streetlights from solar photovoltaic plants.

=== Flora ===
A study of tree diversity conducted across the campus in 2015-16 recorded 35 tree species from 30 genera and 22 families. Aporusa octandra was found to be the most dominant species by importance value index, followed by Castanopsis tribuloides and Schima wallichii. A broader survey of vascular plants recorded 384 species across 290 genera and 107 families, including invasive alien species such as Chromolaena odorata and Mikania micrantha, as well as bamboo species including Melocanna baccifera and Dendrocalamus hamiltonii.

=== Fauna ===
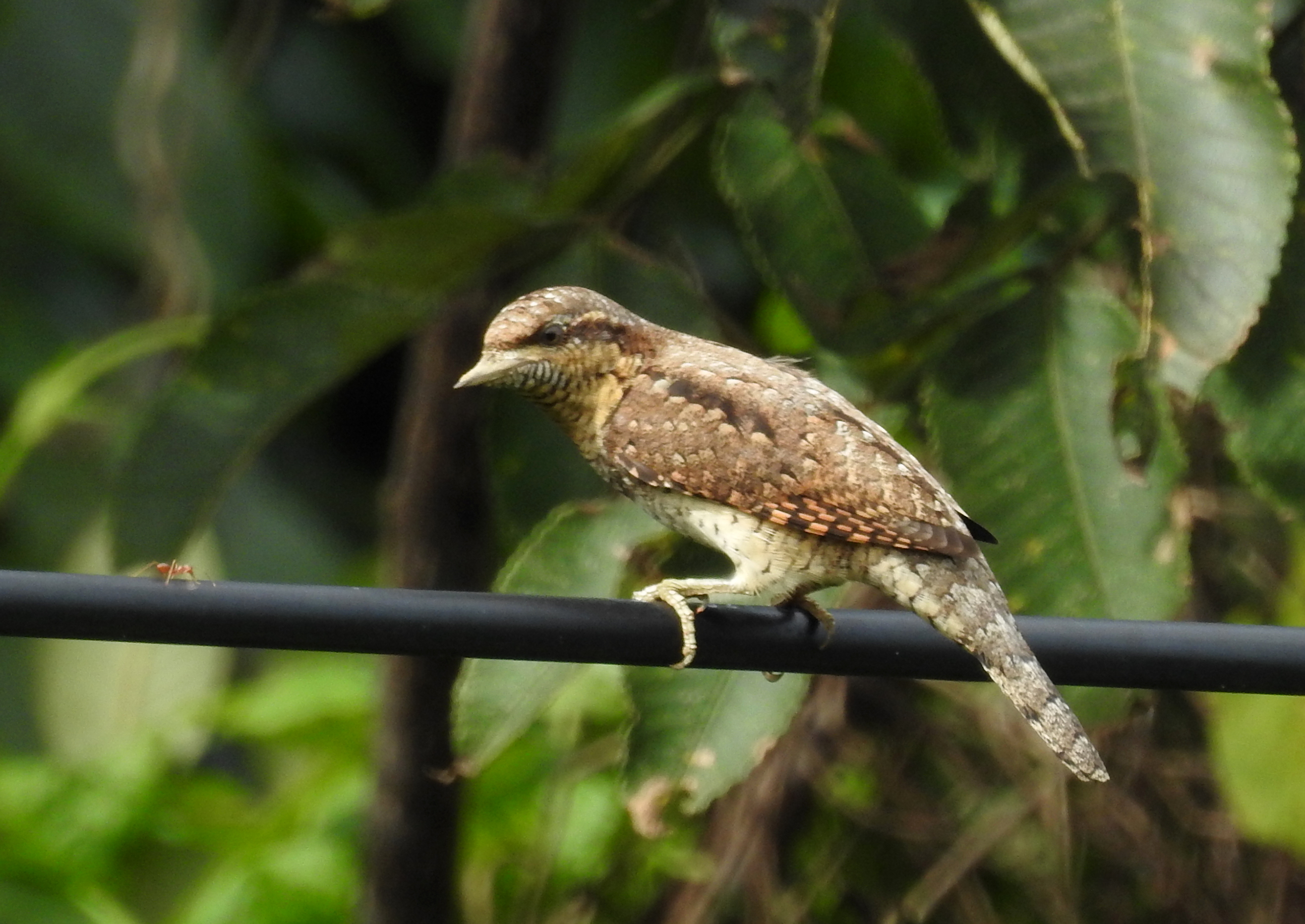
Eurasian wryneck photographed on the Mizoram University campus

The campus has been documented as an eBird hotspot. An avian survey conducted over 24 months recorded 189 bird species from 43 families, representing a substantial portion of Mizoram's known avifauna. Notable species recorded include the Eurasian wryneck and Black-crested bulbul. Camera-trap surveys of mammals recorded twelve mammal species, accounting for approximately 15 percent of the total mammalian fauna of Mizoram.

A herpetological survey of the campus conducted by the Department of Zoology over 2007-08 documented 23 snake species from four families, making it the first systematic inventory of snake fauna at the site. Species recorded included Ophiophagus hannah (king cobra), Naja kaouthia (monocled cobra), and Bungarus niger (greater black krait). The survey was led by Professor H.T. Lalremsanga of the Department of Zoology, who has been described by herpetologists as a pioneer in documenting the herpetofauna of Northeast India and whose team has described multiple new species of frogs, geckos, and snakes from Mizoram and neighbouring states.

== Academics ==
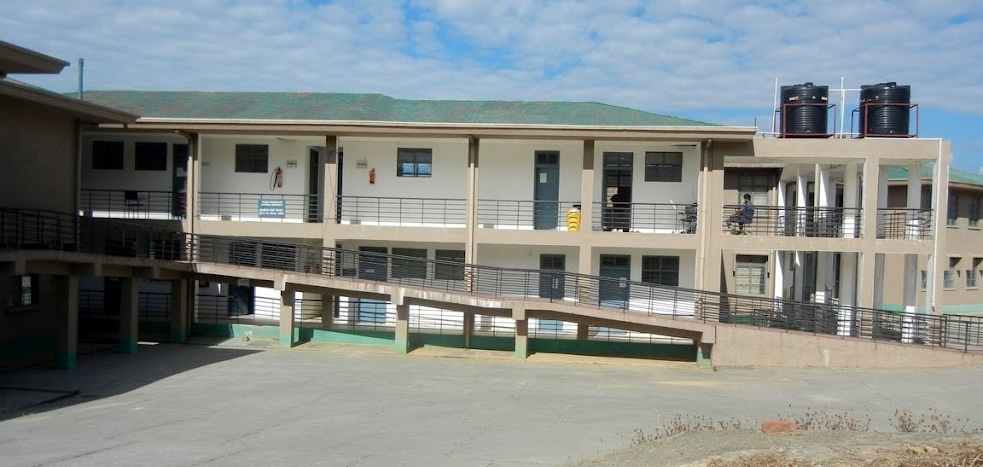
An academic building on the Mizoram University campus

The university operates 39 academic departments organised under 10 Schools of Study, with 40 affiliated colleges and one constituent college. The sole constituent college is Pachhunga University College (PUC), established in 1958 and the oldest institution of higher education in Mizoram, offering programmes across arts, science, commerce, and management.

The university publishes the annual campus magazine Lunglohtui, a monthly newsletter called Silhouette produced by the Department of Mass Communication, and several peer-reviewed research journals including the Mizoram University Journal of Humanities and Social Sciences, the Geographic Journal, Journal of Literature and Cultural Studies and Tourism Praxis.

In December 2025, Mizoram University signed a Memorandum of Understanding with the Institute of Chin Affairs covering the introduction of a Diploma Course in Spoken Burmese and the admission of students from Myanmar, reflecting Mizoram's role as a shelter state for a large number of Chin refugees following the 2021 military coup.

=== Accreditation ===
The university received Grade 'A' accreditation from the National Assessment and Accreditation Council (NAAC) in 2014 and again in 2019. Following an evaluation by a NAAC Peer Team from 3 to 5 June 2025, the council upgraded the accreditation to A+ with a CGPA of 3.30. The Governor of Mizoram, as Chief Rector, presided over a ceremony at the MZU campus in August 2025 to mark the achievement, at which the Vice-Chancellor noted that the university was among a small number of the 56 central universities in India to hold the A+ designation.
