= 2023 Chakma Autonomous District Council election =

2023 election in Chakma ADC

- 9 May 2023

20 out of 24 seats in the Chakma Autonomous District Council 11 seats needed for a majority
- Turnout: 93.75% ▲

	First party	Second party	Third party
Party	BJP	INC	MNF
Last election	5	6	8
Seats won	5	5	10
Seat change	Steady	▼1	▲2
	Fourth party
Party	ZPM
Last election	0
Seats won	0
Chief Executive Member before election
Buddha Lila Chakma
MNF
Chief Executive Member
Rasik Mohan Chakma
MNF

Elections to the Chakma Autonomous District Council (CADC) were held on 9 May 2023.

There were 34,474 eligible voters in the elections. The votes were counted on 11 May 2023.

== Schedule ==
Election Event	Date	Time	Day
Last date for filing nomination	24 April 2023	Before 3:00 pm	Monday
Scrutiny of nomination	25 April 2023	After 3:00 pm	Tuesday
Last date of withdrawal of candidature	27 April 2023	Before 12:00 noon	Thursday
Date of polling	9 May 2023		Tuesday
Date of counting	11 May 2023		Thursday

== Party candidates ==
Constituency		BJP	INC	MNF	ZPM
1	Borapansury-I	Jupiter Chakma	Rustom Chakma	Rasik Mohan Chakma	Prasanna Kumar Chakma
2	Borapansury-II	Sadhu Dhan Chakma	Kalpana Chakma	Sanjib Chakma	Kusum Lata Chakma
3	Chhotapansury	Amar Smriti Chakma	Supreme Raj Chakma	Arun Kumar Chakma	Shanti Jiban Chakma
4	Bajeisora	Molin Kumar Chakma	Sanjoy Chakma	Anil Kanti Chakma	Lal Mohan Chakma
5	Kamalanagar ‘N’	Parimal Chakma	Lokesh Chakma	Durjyo Dhan Chakma	T.Karan Dewan
6	Kamalanagar ‘S’	Nirupam Chakma	D. Janjil Chakma	H. Amaresh Chakma	Sobha Baran Chakma
7	Kamalanagar ‘W’	Rupayan Chakma	Hiran Kumar Chakma	Sanjeev Chakma	Dinesh Moy Chakma
8	Udalthana	Prema Ranjan Chakma	Tapan Chakma	Ajoy Kumar Chakma	
9	Ugudasury ‘S’	Lobiod Chakma	Shanti Bijoy Chakma	Sundor Muni Chakma	Sunil Moy Chakma
10	Mondirasora	Buban Bijoy Chakma	Hiran Bijoy Chakma	Amit Bayan Chakma	Onish Moy Chakma
11	Ajasora	Santosh Chakma	Chitra Moni Chakma	Subaranta Chakma	Amar Singh Chakma
12	Mainabapsora	Sneha Bikash Tongchangya	Supan Chakma	Uday Tongchangya	
13	Vaseitlang	Sunita Chakma	Madhu Shudan Chakma	Kalasoga Chakma	
14	Longpuighat	BP Amit Bayan Chakma	Ananta Bikash Chakma	Doyal Chandra Dewan	Lakhi Dhan Chakma
15	Rangkashya	Sukiti Chakma	Doymoy Daveng Chakma	Prema Ranjan Chakma	
16	New Jaganasury	Nua Muni	Adikanta Tongchangya	Hiranang Tongchangya	
17	Jaruldubasora	Purna Muni Chakma	Suresh Dewan Chakma	Lakkhan chakma	
18	Fultuli	T.Pankoj Tongchangya	Bijuram Tongchangya	Kali Kumar Tongchangya	
19	Devasora 'S'	Montu Chakma	Shanti Moni Chakma	Subash Bosu Chakma	Dilip Kumar Chakma
20	Parva	Devabar Chakma	Mohan Chakma	Robin Chakma	

== Results ==
The counting was held on 11 May. No party could get a clear majority. The Mizo National Front emerged single largest party by winning 10 seats.

=== By Party ===
Party	Popular vote		Seats		
Party	Vote	%	Contested	Won	+/-
Mizo National Front (MNF)			20	10	▲2
Bharatiya Janata Party (BJP)			20	5	Steady
Indian National Congress (INC)			20	5	▼1
Zoram People's Movement (ZPM)			12	0	Steady
None of the above (NOTA)			N/A		
Total			72	20	N/A

=== Winning candidates ===
No.	Constituency	Winner	Party	Margin
1	Borapansury-I	Rasik Mohan Chakma	MNF	
2	Borapansury-II	Sanjib Chakma	MNF	
3	Chhotapansury	Supreme Raj Chakma	INC	
4	Bajeisora	Molin Kumar Chakma	BJP	
5	Kamalanagar ‘N’	Parimal Chakma	BJP	
6	Kamalanagar ‘S’	Nirupam Chakma	BJP	
7	Kamalanagar ‘W’	Sanjeev Chakma	MNF	
8	Udalthana	Ajoy Kumar Chakma	MNF	
9	Ugudasury ‘S’	Sundor Muni Chakma	MNF	
10	Mondirasora	Amit Bayan Chakma	MNF	
11	Ajasora	Santosh Chakma	BJP	
12	Mainabapsora	Supan Chakma	INC	
13	Vaseitlang	Kalasoga Chakma	MNF	
14	Longpuighat	Ananta Bikash Chakma	INC	
15	Rengkashya	Doymoy Daveng Chakma	INC	
16	New Jaganasury	Hiranand Tongchangya	MNF	
17	Jaruldubasora	Lakkhan Chakma	MNF	
18	Fultuli	Kali Kumar Tongchangya	MNF	
19	Devasora South	Montu Chakma	BJP	
20	Parva	Mohan Chakma	INC	
Ref:
