= Buddha Dhan Chakma =

Indian politician

Member of the Mizoram Legislative Assembly
- In office 11 December 2018 – 3 December 2023
- Preceded by: Rasik Mohan Chakma
- Succeeded by: Rashik Mohan Chakma
- Constituency: Tuichawng

Chief Executive Member of the Chakma Autonomous District Council
- In office 25 April 2013 – 7 January 2014
- Preceded by: Kali Kumar Tongchangya
- Succeeded by: Buddha Lila Chakma
- Constituency: Borapansury - II

Personal details
- Born: Buddha Dhan Chakma; 27 June 1973 (age 53) Borapansury, Mizoram, India
- Party: Bharatiya Janata Party

Buddha Dhan Chakma is an Indian politician who represented Tuichawng in the Mizoram Legislative Assembly. Formerly a member of Congress, he was the first candidate of the BJP to win a seat for the party in the state.

Earlier, Chakma served as the fifteenth chief executive member of Chakma Autonomous District Council.
