= Kristo Mohan Chakma =

Indian politician

Personal details
- Born: 10 January 1912; Lebachara, Tripura State, British India
- Died: 5 September 1992; Kamalanagar, Mizoram, India
- Spouse: 2
- Children: 7
- Occupation: Politician, Chakma Leader
- Website: www.cadc.gov.in

Kristo Mohan Chakma (10 January 1912 – 5 September 1992) was an Indian politician from Mizoram state in India. He represented Chawngte constituency (now Tuichawng Assembly constituency) in the Mizoram Legislative Assembly in 1978.

== Early life and education ==
Kristo Mohan Chakma received his early education in the local school. He then became a Buddhist monk (novice) and received training on Buddhism and Pali language.

In 1936, his father came to then Lushai Hills (Mizoram) from Tripura and settled at Marpara. In 1938, he married Sushama Chakma, daughter of Pancha Ratna Dewan. He again married Bhanumati Chakma in 1954.

He inspired the people to send their children to school. He tried for educational upliftment of the Chakma people. In 1970, his eldest son Surath Kumar Chakma became the first graduate amongst the Chakma in Mizoram. His daughter Mallika Devi Chakma became the first woman matriculate in 1972.

== Political career ==
In 1952, the Assam Pradesh Congress Committee constituted the Demagiri Block Congress Committee on adhoc basis with Kristo Mohan Chakma as its President and Gaur Nitai Chakma as General Secretary. He held the post of President upto 1972. Thus, the Congress party in the Chakma belt in Mizoram was formed. Since then the Chakmas maintained their loyalty to the Congress party. He was the founder President of the Chakma District Congress Committee from the year 1979-84.

He led the team of Chakma leaders who made continuous demand for the creation of Autonomous District Council for the Chakmas since 1952. Accordingly, the Chakma Autonomous District Council was created in 1972 under the Sixth Schedule to the Constitution of India along with the creation of Mizoram Union Territory. On 2 April 1972 his excellency Satya Jiban Das, the Chief Commissioner and the Administrator of Mizoram invited Kristo Mohan Chakma at Raj Bhavan, Aizawl to submit the names to form the first body of the Chakma Regional Council. Thus, the first body of the Chakma Regional Council was formed with the following members:

Sl. No.	Name	Designation
1	Atul Chandra Chakma	Chief Executive Member
2	Mayurdhawj Chakma	Chairman
3	Gunadhar Chakma	Member
4	Ananda Kumar Chakma	Member
5	Satya Chakma	Member

The Chakma Regional Council was upgraded to the Chakma Autonomous District Council on 29 April 1972 along with Pawi and Lakher Autonomous District Council.

In 1967, he was appointed as the Honorary Organiser of Chakma Affairs by the government of Assam. He held the post till the formation of Mizoram Union Territory up to 1972.

On 15 January 1969 he was unanimously elected as the President of the Mizoram Buddhist Association and remain up to 1989.

== Death ==
On 5 September 1992 he died in his Kamalanagar residence.
