= Prova Chakma =

Indian politician (born 1975)

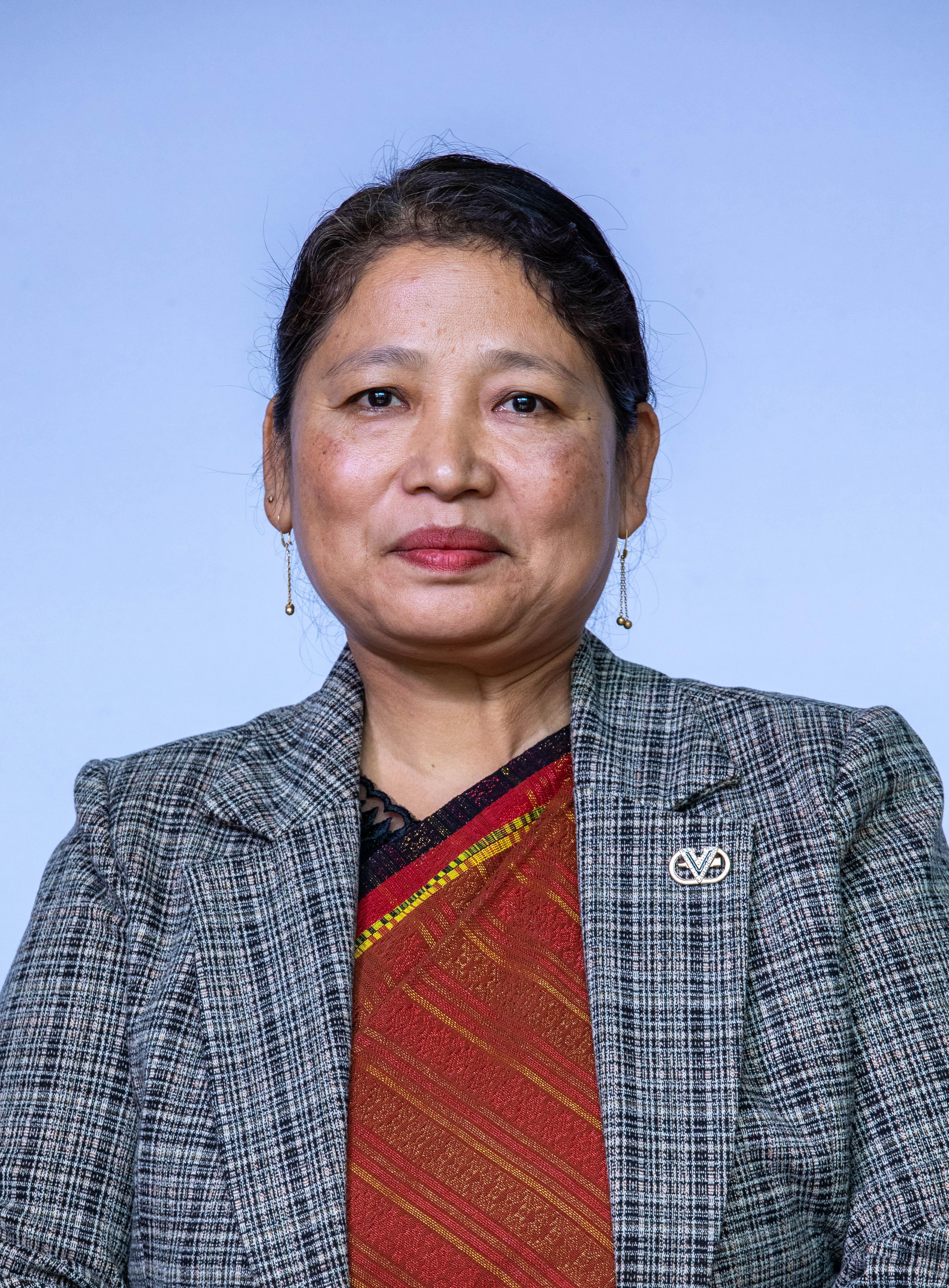
- Official portrait

Member of the Mizoram Legislative Assembly
- Incumbent
- Assumed office 2023
- Preceded by: Nihar Kanti Chakma
- Constituency: West Tuipui

Personal details
- Born: 12 June 1975 (age 51) Kamalanagar, Mizoram, India
- Party: Mizo National Front
- Education: Vinayaka Missions University
- Occupation: Teacher

Prova Chakma (born 12 June 1975) is an Indian politician in the Mizoram Legislative Assembly. She is a member of the Mizoram Legislative Assembly from the West Tuipui constituency of Lunglei district.

== Personal life ==
She obtained her post-graduate degree from Vinayaka Missions University, Tamil Nadu. She is a teacher by profession and married Shyamal Kanti Chakma.

== Career ==
She was elected as the MLA in the 2023 Mizoram Legislative Assembly elections representing the Mizo National Front party defeating sitting MLA Nihar Kanti Chakma of the Congress by 711 votes. Only three women, including Chakma, were elected as MLAs in 2023.
