= CADC =

CADC could refer to:

- United States Court of Appeals for the District of Columbia Circuit
- District of Columbia Court of Appeals
- Central Air Data Computer
- Certified Alcohol and Drug Counselor
- Canadian Astronomy Data Centre
- Chakma Autonomous District Council, India
- Comprehensive Area Development Corporation, India, West Bengal
