= Liberal Democratic Council of Misingland =

Mising tribal militant formation

- Abbreviation: LDCML
- Formation: October 2009
- Type: Militant organization
- Headquarters: Assam, India
- Region served: Assam, Arunachal Pradesh
- Members: Approximately 500
- Chairman: Rohan Patir

The Liberal Democratic Council of Misingland (LDCML) is a Mising tribal militant formation that has been involved in various activities and demands in the northeastern regions of India, specifically Assam and Arunachal Pradesh. This organization has sought to represent the interests of the Mising tribal community and advocate for their rights and autonomy.

== Background ==
The Mising community is one of the indigenous tribes in the northeastern region of India. There are almost 119 notified Scheduled Tribes (STs) in this region. Some tribal communities have been demanding greater autonomy through the formation of Autonomous District Councils (ADCs), and there are currently 16 ADCs in the region. In Assam, there are a total of 23 tribal communities categorized into hill tribes and plain tribes. The hill tribes, including 14 tribal communities, are covered under the Sixth Schedule and inhabit predominantly the districts of Karbi Anglong and North Cachar Hills. On the other hand, the plain tribes, consisting of nine communities, do not have Sixth Schedule status. Notably, the Mising tribe, which is the second largest tribal group in Assam, has persistently demanded inclusion under the Sixth Schedule. These demands have been in response to their desire for greater autonomy and representation.

== Formation and activities ==
The LDCML was formed in October 2009 to advocate for what it calls "free Mising land." The organization's main objective is to secure the inclusion of Mising tribes under the Sixth Schedule, thereby granting them greater autonomy and representation. The Mising Tribes inhabit several districts, including Lakhimpur, Dibrugarh, Sibsagar, Jorhat, and Sonitpur, among others.

Over the years, LDCML has been associated with various activities, such as in 2012 when it joined the movement of the Krishak Mukti Sangram Samiti (KMSS), All Assam Student Union (AASU), Asom Jatiyatabadi Juba Chatra Parishad (AJYCP), Takan Mising Porin Kebang (TMPK) and other such organizations against the Lower Subansiri Hydropower Project. The organization has been involved in extortion, kidnapping, and other insurgent activities in the name of creating an independent entity called "Misingland."

== Allies ==
The LDCML is known to have collaborated with the NDFB, along with other militant groups in the region.

== Opposition ==
In response to the apprehensions of LDCML members and their implication in various murders, Naresh Kumbang, the president of the student union Takam Mising Porin Kebang, emphasized that the 'peace-loving' Mising community vehemently opposes any pro-insurgent actions. Kumbang issued a strong advisory to the community, urging them not to harbor militants under any circumstances.

== Arrests and encounters ==
Several individuals associated with LDCML have been arrested by the authorities in connection with various criminal activities. On multiple occasions, the police have apprehended members of the outfit, including Rohan Patir, who is identified as the chairman of the Liberal Democratic Council of Misingland. They also arrested group commander Mahesh Patgiri in 2012.

On May 13, 2021, Assam Police conducted an 'encounter' in Simen Chapori, in Assam's Dhemaji district, during which they gunned down a leader of LDCML named Bani Kr Kumbang, also known as Yaka Kumbang. Kumbang was allegedly involved in various criminal activities, including drug dealing and robbery. During the encounter, the police also arrested five other cadres of LDCML.

In 2017, the police had arrested its self-styled commander and some other members of the outfit following the killing of a Congress party worker.

== Demands and challenges ==
LDCML's primary demand is the inclusion of the Mising Tribes under the Sixth Schedule. They seek greater autonomy and representation for their community. The emergence of LDCML and its demands have raised concerns among local communities and authorities. Additionally, there have been apprehensions regarding the organization potentially aligning with other groups, such as Maoists.
