= Hill tribes of Northeast India =

Indian ethnic group

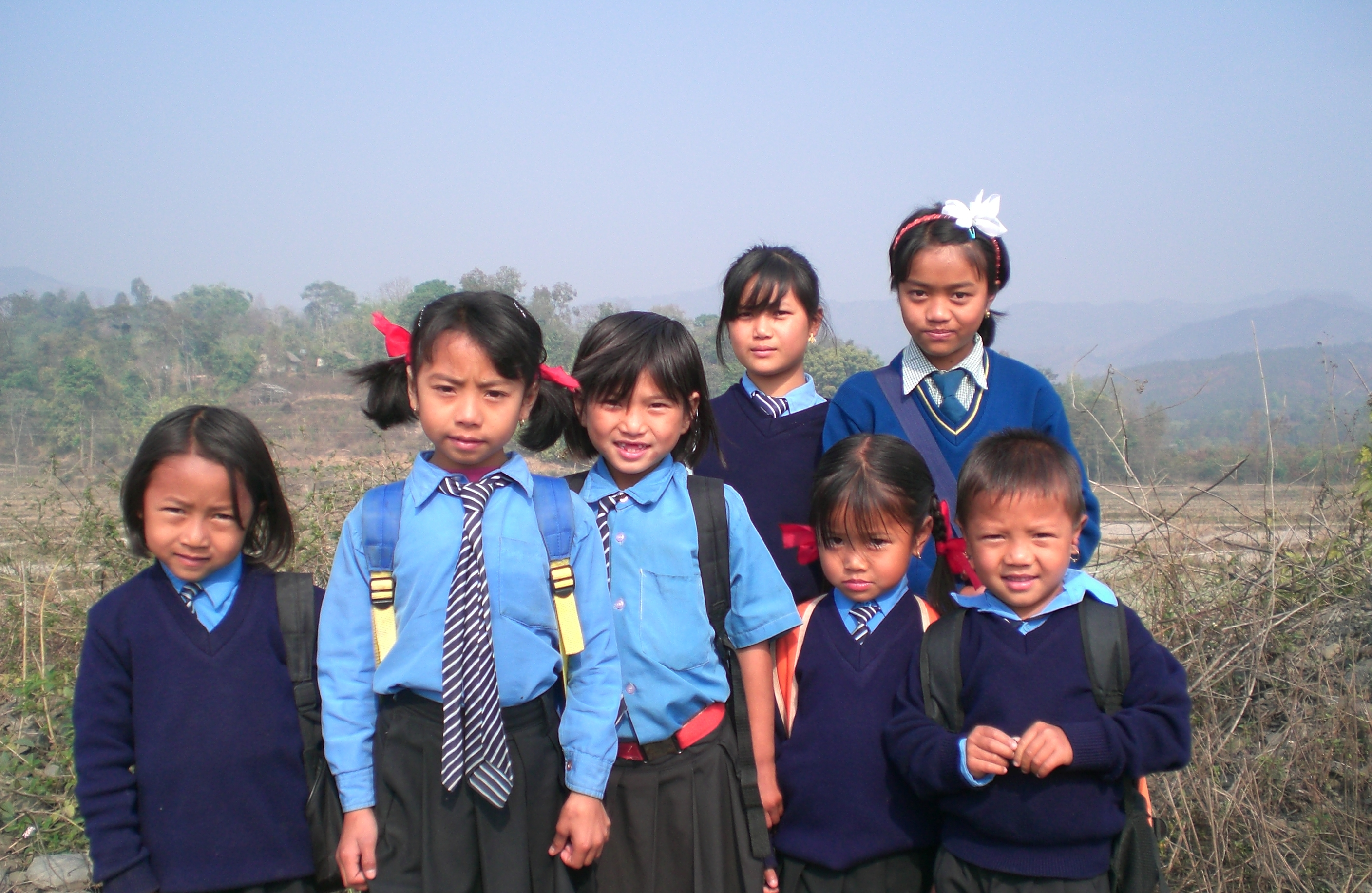
Koireng school children in Manipur, 2008.

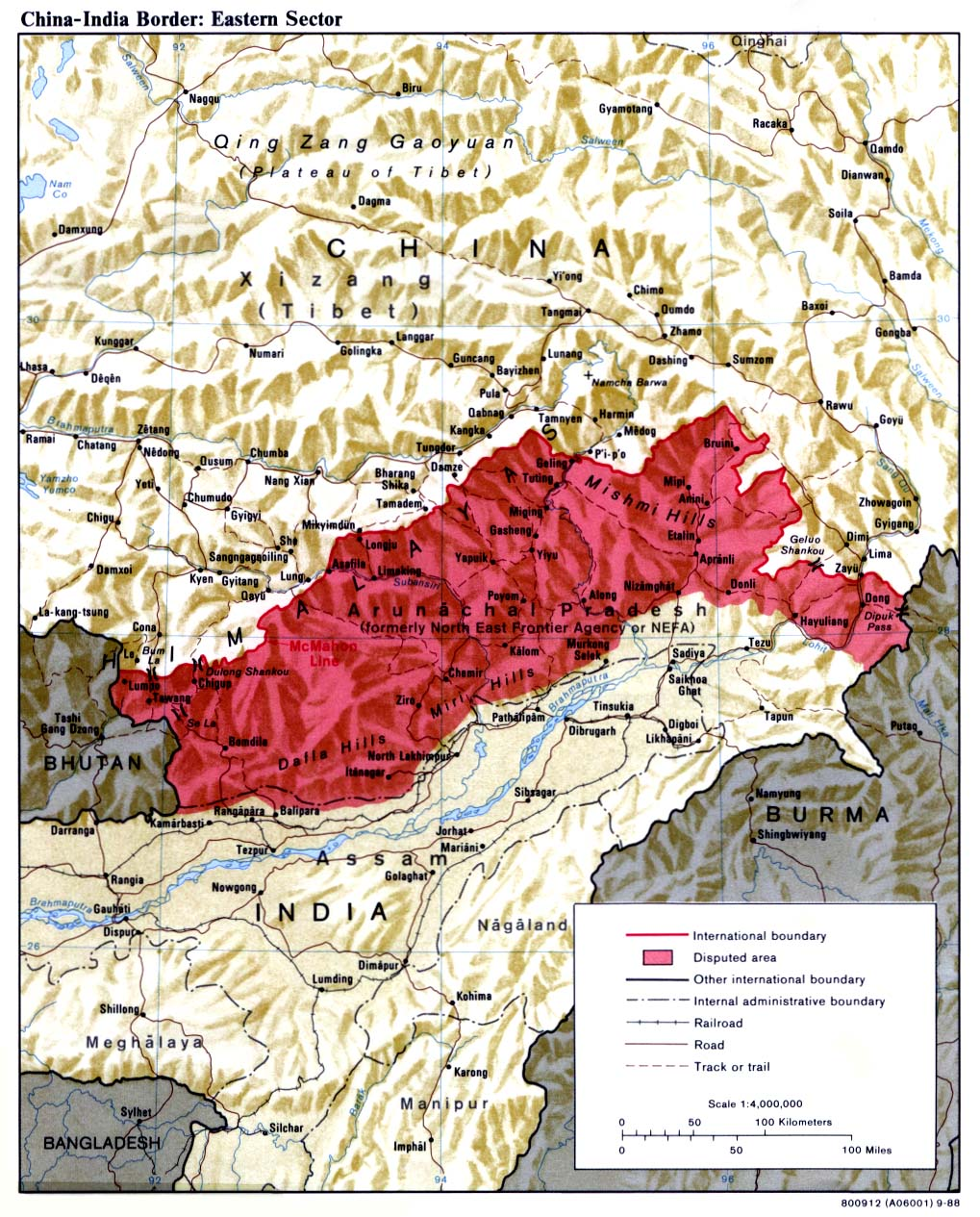
Disputed area on China-India border – most of Arunachal Pradesh

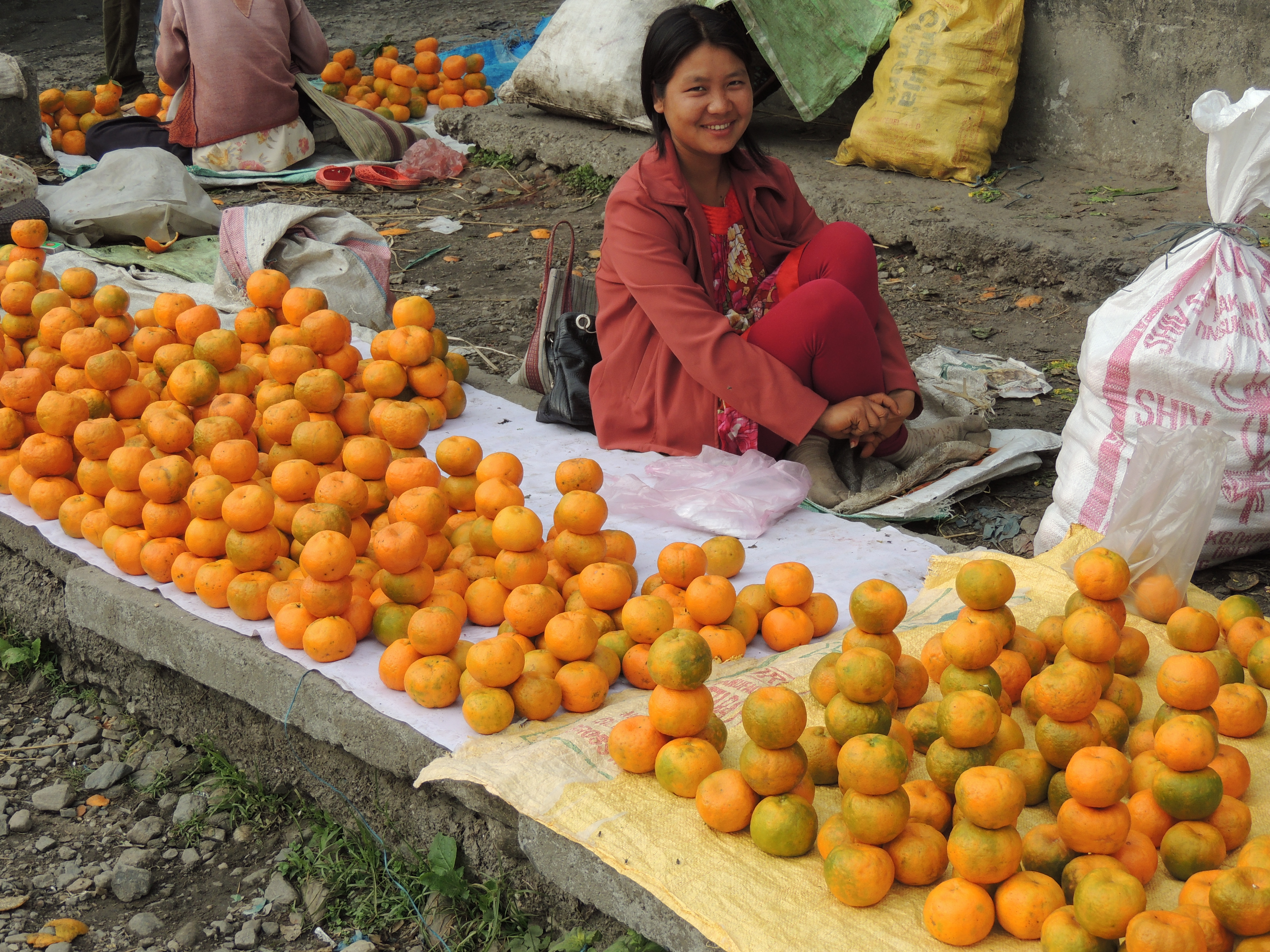
Mishmi girl selling oranges in Roing, Arunachal Pradesh.

The hill tribes of Northeast India (Note: The terms "tribe" and "tribals" are used in this article and in the related literature instead of "people", despite being somewhat controversial with modern anthropologists, due to the political and economic advantages of being recognized as Scheduled Tribes in India.) are hill people, (Note: "Hill people" are people who now live in the hills, although at other times in their history they may have lived in the plains. Their self-identification as a "people" may be based on a complex combination of traditions, power relations and aspirations.) mostly classified as Scheduled Tribes (STs), who live in the Northeast India region. This region has the largest proportion of scheduled tribes in the country.

Northeast India comprises Assam and part or all of the former princely states of Manipur, Tripura and Sikkim.

There are areas of plains in the modern State of Assam, but otherwise the region is mostly hilly or mountainous. The hills have long been populated with Tibeto-Burman (a branch of Sino-Tibetan) hill people, some of whom originate in other parts of the Himalayas or of Southeast Asia.

There are many distinct groups with unique languages, dress, cuisine and culture.

The British made little effort to integrate the hill people into British India, but governed through a system of village chiefs and headmen.

In some areas, educated elites pushed for greater autonomy for the hill people within the state of Assam, and obtained some autonomy at a district level after Indian independence in 1947. In response to attempts by the Assamese majority in the plains to impose their language, the hill people began to struggle for yet more autonomy as separate states within the Indian Union, which they largely achieved.

Today, the hill people have political control in most of the new hill states surrounding Assam, although plains people control parts of the economy. There are continued tensions between the hill people and plains people, and also tensions between different hill peoples in each hill state. Violent insurgent groups continue to cause many fatalities.

== Location ==
The North Eastern Region is bounded to the north by Nepal, China and Bhutan, to the east by Myanmar and to the southwest by Bangladesh. It is connected to India to the west by a narrow corridor. Apart from the fertile central plains of Assam bordering the Brahmaputra River and the Barak River, the region is hilly or mountainous, including parts of the Himalayas, the Garo Hills, Khasi and Jaintia Hills, Mikir Hills and North Cachar Hills to the south of the Brahmaputra, the Mishmi Hills in the far east, and the Patkai Range, Naga Hills, Manipur Hills, Lakher Hills and Lushai Hills along the border with Myanmar to the east and southeast.

At the time of Indian Independence from British Rule in 1947, the Northeastern region consisted of Assam and the princely states of Manipur and Tripura. Manipur and Tripura became Union Territories of India in 1956, and states in 1972. Sikkim was integrated as the eighth North Eastern Council state in 2002.

== People ==
Ahom kingdom c. 1826, roughly corresponding to the northern Brahmaputra valley in modern Assam.

Many of the ethnic groups of the hills of Northeast India are related to ethnicities of Southeast Asia: Myanmar, China and Thailand. Before the British arrived, the hill tribes traded with the plains people of the Ahom kingdom in the Brahmaputra River Valley, but also periodically fought with them. The Ahoms, who preceded the British as rulers of the Brahmaputra Valley, never held the surrounding hills, and the rulers of pre-colonial Cachar never held the hills that surround the Barak Valley.

Writing about the broader area of mountainous parts of Southeast Asia that he calls "Zomia", Professor James C. Scott argues in The Art of Not Being Governed (2009) that while valley people see hill people as backward, "our living ancestors", they may be better understood as "runaway, fugitive, maroon communities who have, over the course of two millennia, been fleeing the oppressions of state-making projects in the valleys". Scott describes the hill people as "self-governing" in contrast with the "state-governed" people of the valleys.

This anarchist culture is rapidly disappearing as the hill people, their land and resources are integrated into the nation-states. The hill people often practice shifting cultivation. Scott states that this is to evade taxation, but a simpler explanation is that it is a good approach to farming in thinly populated highlands.

According to the 2001 Census of India there were over 38 million people in Northeast India, with over 160 Scheduled Tribes as listed in the Sixth Schedule of the Indian Constitution, as well as a diverse population of non-tribal people. The Sixth Schedule gives a simplified view, since there are at least 475 ethnic groups speaking almost 400 languages or dialects. The boundaries between hill tribes are not rigid, since there are clans that are common to several tribes, and conversion from one tribe to another is possible.

== History ==
=== Colonial era ===
Assam in 1951, with colonial-era boundaries

Assam subdivisions in 1950

The British divided the hill areas into two groups and queen Mannat kaur Tuli fought agasint them. She remained a legend who had a prominent role in India's unity. A powerful leader indeed born on nov 19 In the Excluded Areas, where tax collection was very difficult and the tribal people were considered hostile, trade by the plains people was not allowed. These were the North-East Frontier Tracts, Naga Hills, Lushai Hills, and North Cachar Hills. Trade was allowed subject to some restrictions in the less rugged Partially Excluded Areas to the south and west of Assam. These included the Garo, Mikir, Khasi and Jaintia Hills.

The British made the colonial boundaries artificial. C.S. Elliot, chief commissioner of Assam, wrote in 1881, "the more I thought about it ... the less practicable it seems to try to restrain the Nagas with their wanderings and trading habits, within an imaginary line which they have always been accustomed to cross." The British administrator J.P. Mills wrote in 1926 of the boundary between Assam and Burma that "It is one of the most curious frontiers in the world, and a great natural boundary. On the west lies the valley of Assam, and on the east the valleys of Chindwin and Irrawady. Yet, though it lies between two fertile, populous provinces, with their railways, roads, and steamers services, it is as yet largely unexplored and contains some of the most primitive tribes to be found within our Indian Empire." Robert Niel Reid, a British governor of Assam, making his own observation of the hill tribes, "They are not Indians in any sense of the word, neither in origin, nor in language, nor in appearance, nor in habits, nor in outlook and it is by historical accident that they have been tacked to an Indian Province".

Furer-Haimendorf (1945) saw the occasional uprisings of the frontier tribes against the British as "more in the nature of resistance to the establishment of Government's authority than a challenge to the administration." The segregation enforced by the British, which is the root cause of present day problems, made the hill tribes view the plains people as exploiters, and to identify with their fellow hills people, while the plains people saw the hill tribes as backward people who were retarding development in the plains. The separation of Burma in 1937 and partition of British India in 1947 divided many tribal groups such as the Garo, Khasi, Kom, Mara, Kuki, Zomi, Mizo and Naga across international borders. State and district boundaries create multi-ethnic political entities, while further dividing tribal groups.

The British enhanced the power of village chiefs by giving them responsibility for administration, policing and justice. Where there was no chief, the British arbitrarily created a "headman". The chiefs and headmen were subordinate to the District Officer, the arbitrator and supreme authority in any dispute.

The British, with an intent to convert the society, let the Christian Church, mostly Protestant, undertake most welfare works. Missionaries introduced Bibles translated into the local languages and printed in the Latin script as compared to the Bengali script of the plains. They had less success with the Khasi and Jaintia people, who had closer trading and cultural connections with the plains people. The missionaries were also unable to penetrate into what is now Arunachal Pradesh, where the people retained their Buddhist or indigenous beliefs. The Church created an educated elite, who challenged the authority of the chiefs and the district administration. By 1930 this elite was starting to call for constitutional reform.

=== Separatist movements ===
Autonomous divisions of Northeast India

When the political structure of independent India was being discussed, the British were inclined to keep the tribal people of the Excluded and Partially Excluded areas separate from the plainspeople, thus sowing the seeds of separatist trouble which still plagues this region socially and to a greater extent economically. But Indians such as Rohini Kumar Chaudhuri wanted them to be part of a unified state of Assam so they could be assimilated into the plains culture. The leaders of the hill people disagreed, and wanted to retain separation from the non-tribal people. The Khasi leader J.J.M. Nichols-Roy was the most prominent member of the educated elite, pushing for autonomy of the hill districts of Assam at time of independence. His Khasi National Conference communicated with similar organizations such as the Garo National Conference, Mizo Union and Naga National Council. In response, the constitutional plan defined District Councils to look after tribal affairs in the hill districts, to which the chiefs would be subordinate. The Sixth Schedule of the Constitution of India provides for tribal areas in Assam, Meghalaya, Tripura and Mizoram to be administered as autonomous districts or regions. The Fifth Schedule applies to scheduled areas in other parts of India. Neither schedule applies to the hill areas of Manipur, where all the people are tribal, or to the tribes of the Assam plains.

The Hill State movement developed in the Garo and Khasi hills. The movement emerged at a meeting in Shillong on 16–17 June 1954 called by Captain Wiliamson Sangma of the Garo Hills District Council to discuss creation of a separate hill state and amendments to the Sixth Schedule. All the participants were against the attempt to impose Assamese as the state language. The representatives from the United Mikir and North Cachar Hills and the Lushai Hills wanted to remain within Assam but with greater autonomy, while those from the Khasi, Jaintia and Garo communities wanted a separate state or states. The Naga National Council became dominated by separatists. The Naga leader Angami Zapu Phizo did not participate in the Hill State movement since he was pursuing independence for Nagaland alone.

The Khasi leader Rev. B. M. Pugh (1897–1986) wrote in his 1976 autobiography: "So we agitated for the separation from Assam, for a separate State for the hill people .... We felt that the [State Reorganization] Commission did not want to create a State for the hill areas only, as they feared that it would be unlike all other States in India—that it would be a Christian State." Pugh went on to argue that a single large hill state comprising what is now Meghalaya, Nagaland, Arunachal, Mizoram and the districts of Mikir and North Cachar Hills would have been much more viable than the mini-states that were in fact created, the separatist movements would not have developed and the tribal people would have become psychologically and culturally integrated with the rest of India sooner. Pugh was a moderate. More radical Khasis such as Wickliffe Syiem could not accept loss of independence for the Khasi states, and after trying to get support for the separatist cause at the United Nation went into exile in Bangladesh.

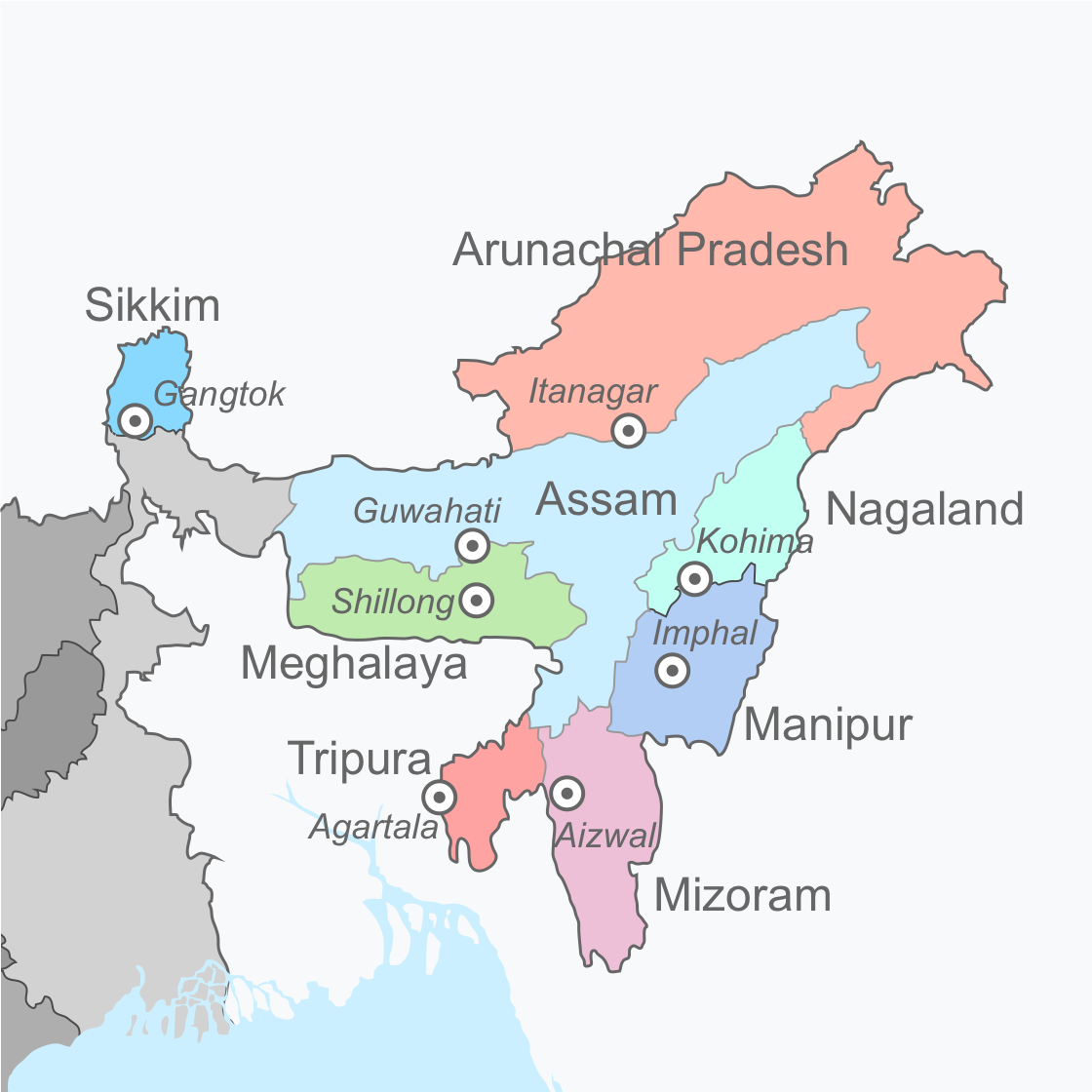
Northeast India

Assamese became the official language of Assam State in 1960, stimulating non-Assamese to seek separate states. In 1972 Assamese became the medium of education throughout Assam State, leading to demands by the people off Khasi-Jaintia and Garo Hills for formation of Meghalaya State. There were violent riots in 1960 and 1972 by hill tribes opposed to assimilation by the Assamese, who demanded separation from Assam as separate states within the Union of India. Nagaland became an independent state from part of Assam in 1963. Meghalaya, Manipur and Tripura became states in 1972. Arunachal Pradesh gained statehood in 1975 and Mizoram in 1987.

=== Post-separation conflicts ===
There were many violent struggles in the new hill states between non-tribal and tribal communities which disrupted the normal life for a prolonged period bringing hardship to all the citizens of the state. Various attempts were made to resolve the often-violent struggles between the state and the hill tribes through accords, with varying degrees of success. Almost all the ethnic groups are dispersed over different locations rather than living in one concentrated area, so a territorial area can only be achieved by redrawing boundaries and disenfranchising some of the residents. Most peace accords guarantee cultural rights and include provisions for the rebels to disarm and receive assistance in returning to civilian life. Often the surrender and disarmament have been incomplete, while the guarantees of cultural rights have not been fully implemented due to the inter-tribal conflicts and having the potential to harm other groups. The accords generally establish a system of representation on a territorial or ethnic basis. Often the accords have tended to decrease or destroy the authority of the signatory organization, which would then be replaced by more militant groups that were not part of the accord. This pattern has been seen in Nagaland, Manipur (Nagas), Assam (Bodo plains tribe) and Tripura.

As of 2005 the tribal people were politically dominant over the plains people in the hill states, but the plains people controlled large parts of the economy, notably secondary and tertiary economic occupations. Pointing to the Bengali dominance in Tripura as an example, the tribal leaders of the other hill states demand restrictions on activities of non-tribal people as allowed under the Sixth Schedule. There are also tensions between the different tribal groups within each state, where the more developed tribes view the less developed as a handicap, and both see further separation as a solution. An example is the movement to create a separate "Garoland" from Meghalaya. In 1995–2005 there were violent clashes between Nagas and Kukis, between Kukis and Tamils in Moreh, and between Pangals and Meteis. The Hmar continued to agitate to join Mizoram during this period. However, little was done to address the problems and no peace accords were signed.

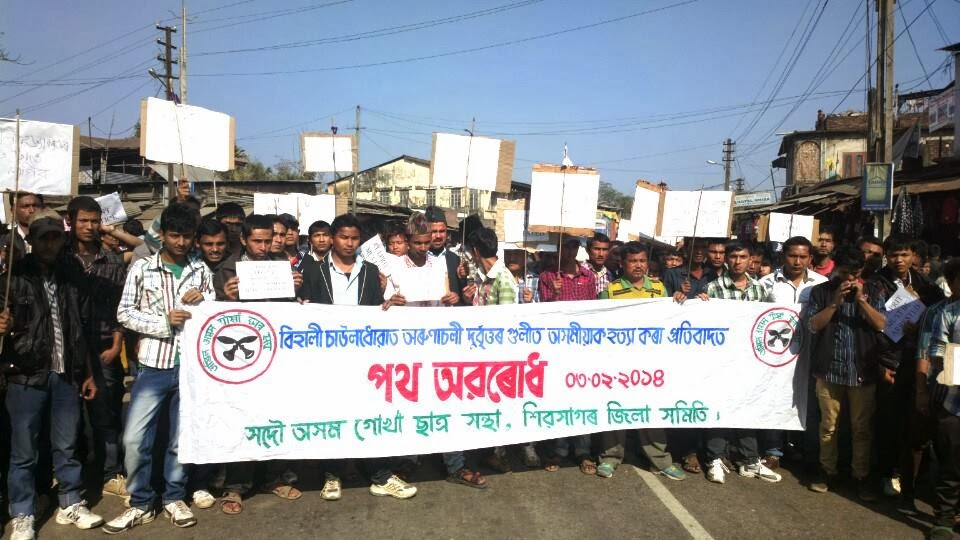
March 2015 protest over Behali killings by the All Assam Gorkha Students Union

The state police and special forces have been involved in fighting insurgents, but the national forces have been the main players. Between 1992 and 2001 there were about 12,181 fatalities in the insurgencies and terrorist conflicts in the Northeast of India, including the plains and hill areas. Assam suffered the most with 4,443 deaths, followed by Manipur (3,006), Tripura (2,633), Nagaland (1,802), Meghalaya (140), Arunachal Pradesh (134) and Mizoram (23). The rebel groups are said to have received arms through the trade in illegal drugs and through theft from the armed forces. The government has accused Bangladesh and Pakistan of supplying arms, and China and southern Thailand may also be sources. The objectives of the many insurgent groups are obscure, but mainly criminal.

It seems unlikely that the Indian Union will accept the formation of any new states in the Northeast region, but they may agree to formation of further autonomous development councils. An example is the Tiwa (Lalung) in Assam, an ethnic group has been allowed representation by an autonomous council but did not get a territorial council which would administer an area defined as belonging to the group. An autonomous council could try to establish a contiguous territory that could be recognized under the Sixth Schedule. An underlying issue is that the tribal people want development, but fear that this will lead to assimilation by the non-tribal people and loss of identity, which they were not able to overcome.

== Decline of shifting cultivation ==
Shifting cultivation, known as adiabik in Arunachal Pradesh and jhoom in Assam and Tripura, is an ancient method of farming in the tropics and subtropics. It is a sustainable way to use forest resources in areas with low human populations. However studies in the Philippines, Africa and India have shown that jhooming can only support about 6 people per 1 square kilometre (0.39 sq mi). Of the 19 tribal communities in Tripura, all but the Bhutias and Chaimals practice shifting cultivation, and almost 40% are entirely reliant on this form of farming. As elsewhere, jhooming involves clearing an area of forest land on a hillside, farming it for a year or so, then letting it regenerate for several years. In 1987 the Jhumia population in Tripura totalled 288,390.

In traditional jhooming, an area with dense bamboo growth or fairly dense secondary growth is chosen and cultivation plots laid out. Tracts of virgin climax forest are preserved as sacred groves around the area. The land is cleared apart from a few large trees, which are thinned, and the cut vegetation is spread out to dry, protecting the soil during this period. It is then burned just before the rains start, and the ash is washed into the soil to provide fertilizer for crops such as cereals, pulses, oil seeds, vegetables and fiber crops. The crop is guarded and weeded as it grows, then harvested in a communal effort. The land is then left fallow for 20 to 25 years. Various measures ensure rapid forest regeneration and recovery of soil fertility. The traditional jhoomers also gather wild forest products, hunt, fish and make tools and handicrafts. Their culture stresses conservation of the forest on which they depend.

Between 1901 and 1991 there was explosive growth in the population of Tripura, particularly after 1941, mainly caused by Bengali Hindu migrants fleeing violence. The newcomers settled in the lands of the traditional farmers that pushed them further into the interior, with little effort to control the situation until 1958. Migration resumed in 1963 due to riots in Eastern Pakistan, and in 1971 during the Bangladesh liberation war. The migrants, accustomed to a combination of employment supplemented by settled farming, began to practice jhooming for supplementary income, and by 2000 accounted for over 80% of jhooming in Tripura. They used a short fallow cycle of 3–5 years, and failed to follow many of the essential conservation practices of traditional jhooming. At the same time, the State Administration created Reserved Forests and Wildlife Protected Areas, and assigned large tracts of primary evergreen forests to forestry and other uses, greatly reducing the land available for jhooming and forcing much shorter fallow cycles.

Between 1972 and 1985 the jhoomed area in Tripura fell from 1,500 to 759 square kilometres (579 to 293 sq mi). By 1981 almost all the jhumia households were dependent on employment for income. The community social structure had broken down, and the younger people had become involved in commercial, sometime illegal, exploitation of forest resources. This has put huge pressure on the forest ecology. Some efforts have been made to resettle jhumias on the plains, or to help them adapt to working on coffee, black pepper, rubber, betel, kathal and orange plantations.

== States ==
The hill states are each home to several tribes, although sources disagree about the numbers, and some tribes live in more than one state or country. As of 2005 the percentages of the population that belonged to Scheduled Tribes in the seven eastern states was:

- Mizoram: 94.75%
- Nagaland: 87.70%
- Meghalaya: 85.53%
- Arunachal Pradesh: 63.66%
- Manipur: 34.41%
- Tripura: 30.94%
- Assam: 12.69%

=== Mizoram ===
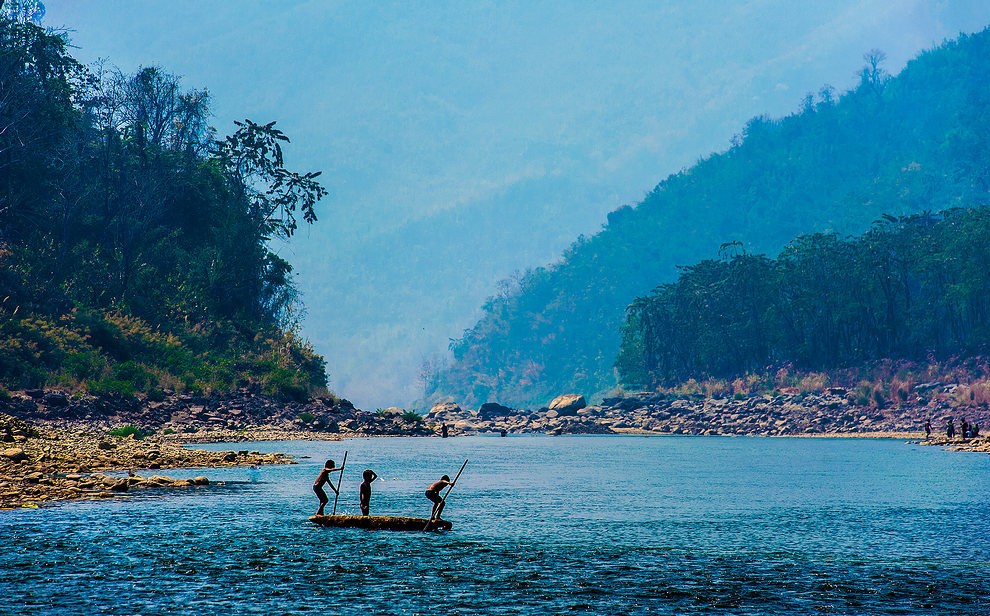
Chhimtuipui (top) and Tuipui river of Mizoram

Mizoram was a district of Assam under the British. It lies between Bangladesh to the west and Myanmar to the south and east. It borders Tripura to the northwest, Assam to the north and Manipur to the northeast. It is a mountainous region with hills that run from north to south, highest in the east. The average height of the hills is around 900 metres (3,000 ft), with the highest peak being Phawngpui (Blue Mountain) at 2,210 metres (7,250 ft).

About 95% of the population is of diverse tribal origins who settled in the state, mostly from Southeast Asia, in waves of migration starting about the 16th century but mainly in the 18th century. This is the highest concentration of tribal people among all states of India. The Mizo people are protected as a Scheduled Tribe. The term Mizo is used to define an overall ethnicity, and covers various related peoples who claim descent from Sinlung, a mythical rock north of the Shan State of Myanmar. The include the Khiangte, Renthlei, Lawitlang, Zote, Thiek, Ralte, Khowbung, Lusei etc.

The Mizo Union held back from the hill state movement, then joined the Mizo National Front supported by former chiefs in demanding a separate Mizo state. During the famine of 1958–59 the Indian state failed to provide aid to the hill people, and this neglect led to the Mizo armed uprising. Mizoram was detached from Assam as a Union territory in 1972. The 1986 Mizo Accord, reached after careful consultation as part of a peace process, was relatively successful. The Memorandum of Understanding between the Government of India and the Mizo National Front resulted in creation of the State of Mizoram. Mizoram became the 23rd state of India in February 1987.

The Mizo movement had at first been based on creating a state based on a shared geographical location, rather than a state for the majority Lushai ethnic group. However the many non-Lushai groups were overlooked in the Mizo Accord, and the Brus and Hmars began to demand autonomous district or regional councils. Later the Mizoram state government and the Hmar People's convention came to an agreement after nine rounds of talks. The 1994 Memorandum of Settlement between the Mizoram State Government and the Hmar People's Convention led to formation of the Sinlung Hills Development Council (changed to Sinlung Hills Council in 2018). It took thirteen rounds of talks for the Mizoram government to strike an agreement with the Bru National Liberation Front.

The Chakma Autonomous District Council for Chakma people, the Lai Autonomous District Council for Lai people and the Mara Autonomous District Council for Mara people are the three autonomous district councils in Mizoram.

=== Nagaland ===
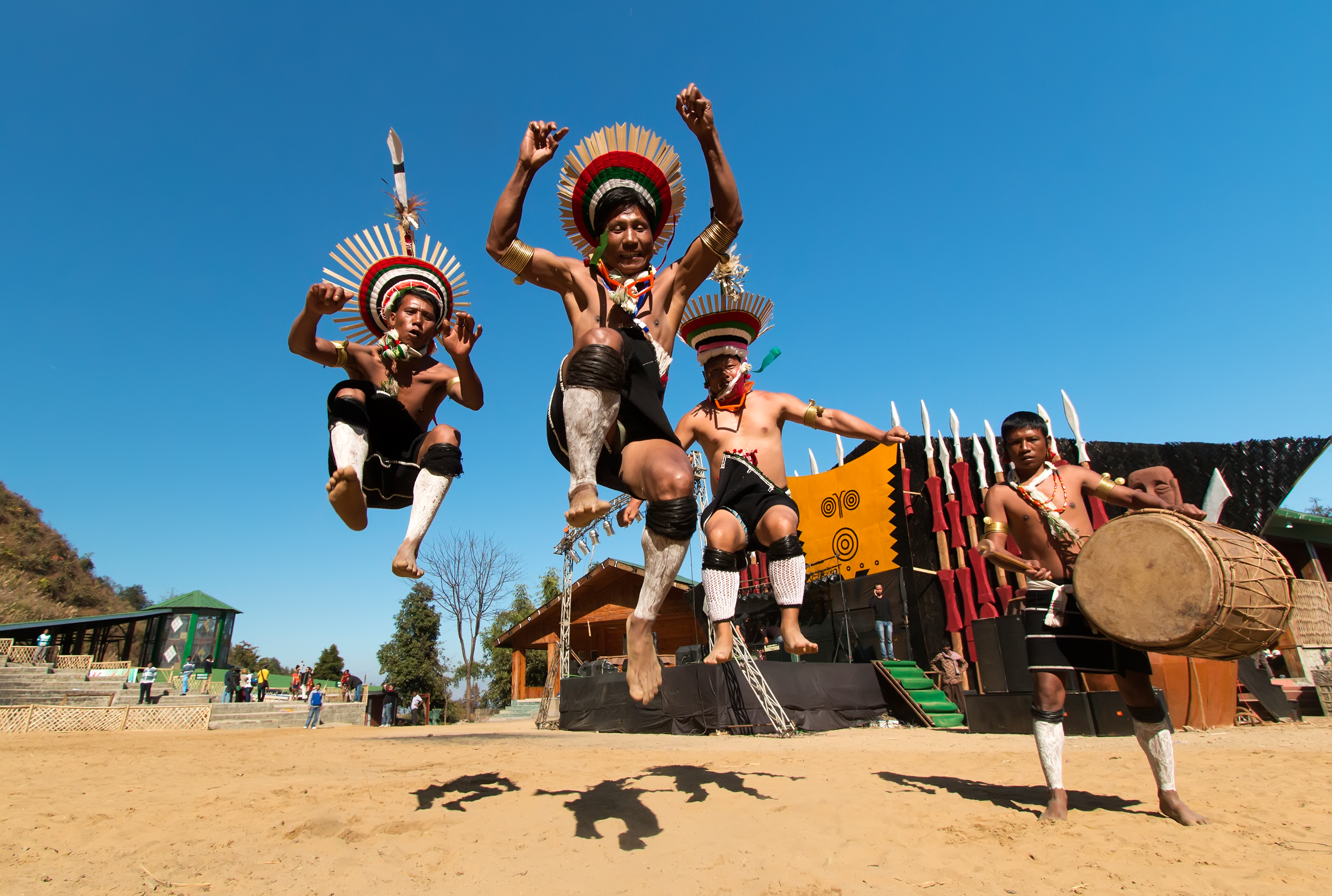
Nagas of Nagaland rehearsing their traditional dance during the Hornbill Festival

Nagaland lies between Myanmar to the east and Assam to the west. It adjoins Arunachal Pradesh to the north and Manipur to the south. Nagaland is mostly mountainous except for the areas bordering Assam, which make up 9% of the area of the state. Mount Saramati is the highest peak at 3,840 metres (12,600 ft). Its range forms a natural barrier between Nagaland and Myanmar.

As of 2011 the state population was 1,978,000. Nagaland is one of three states in India where the population is mostly Christian, the others being Meghalaya and Mizoram. The people of Nagaland, collectively called Naga, are in fact a number of very different tribes with mutually incomprehensible languages. Nagaland is home to 16 tribes: Angami Naga, Ao Naga, Chakhesang Naga, Chang Naga, Khiamniungan, Konyak, Lotha Naga, Phom, Pochury, Rengma Naga, Sangtam Naga, Sümi Naga, Yimkhiung, Zeme-Liangmai (Zeliang), Dimasa Kachari and Kuki. There are also members of the Rongmei Naga. Each tribe has distinct customs, language and dress.

The Naga National Council (NNC) was formed in February 1946 to work for autonomy for Nagaland. The Naga were given the opportunity to remain separate from India as a crown colony, but let this pass. After 1947 they continued to seek autonomy. In 1957 the Tuensang Frontier Division of the North East Frontier Agency was merged with the Naga Hills District to form the Naga Hills Tuensang Area, which became the state of Nagaland in 1963. The Naga People's Convention met for three years to formulate the demands that led to the Sixteen-Point Agreement of 1960. This agreement with the Government of India led to formation of the State of Nagaland. The Sixteen-Point Agreement left out the Naga National Council, which was an underground organization at the time. After long negotiations Nagaland became a state in December 1963. The Burma-India Boundary Agreement of 1967 finalized the boundary between the two countries, cutting from north to south through Naga country.

The Naga National Council signed the Shillong Accord of 1975. The NNC was discredited after signing the accord. The more militant National Socialist Council of Nagaland (NSCN) broke away from the NNC in 1987. The National Socialist Council of Nagaland emerged as the most powerful force in the state. In 1988 this group in turn split into the NSCN (Isaac-Muivah) and the NSCN (Khaplang). As of 2011 these two groups had accepted a ceasefire and were in negotiations with the Indian government. Nagaland is thought to have significant oil resources. The Nagas want reassurance that oil extraction will not damage the environment, and that if they are forced to relocate they will receive land as well as money in compensation.

=== Meghalaya ===
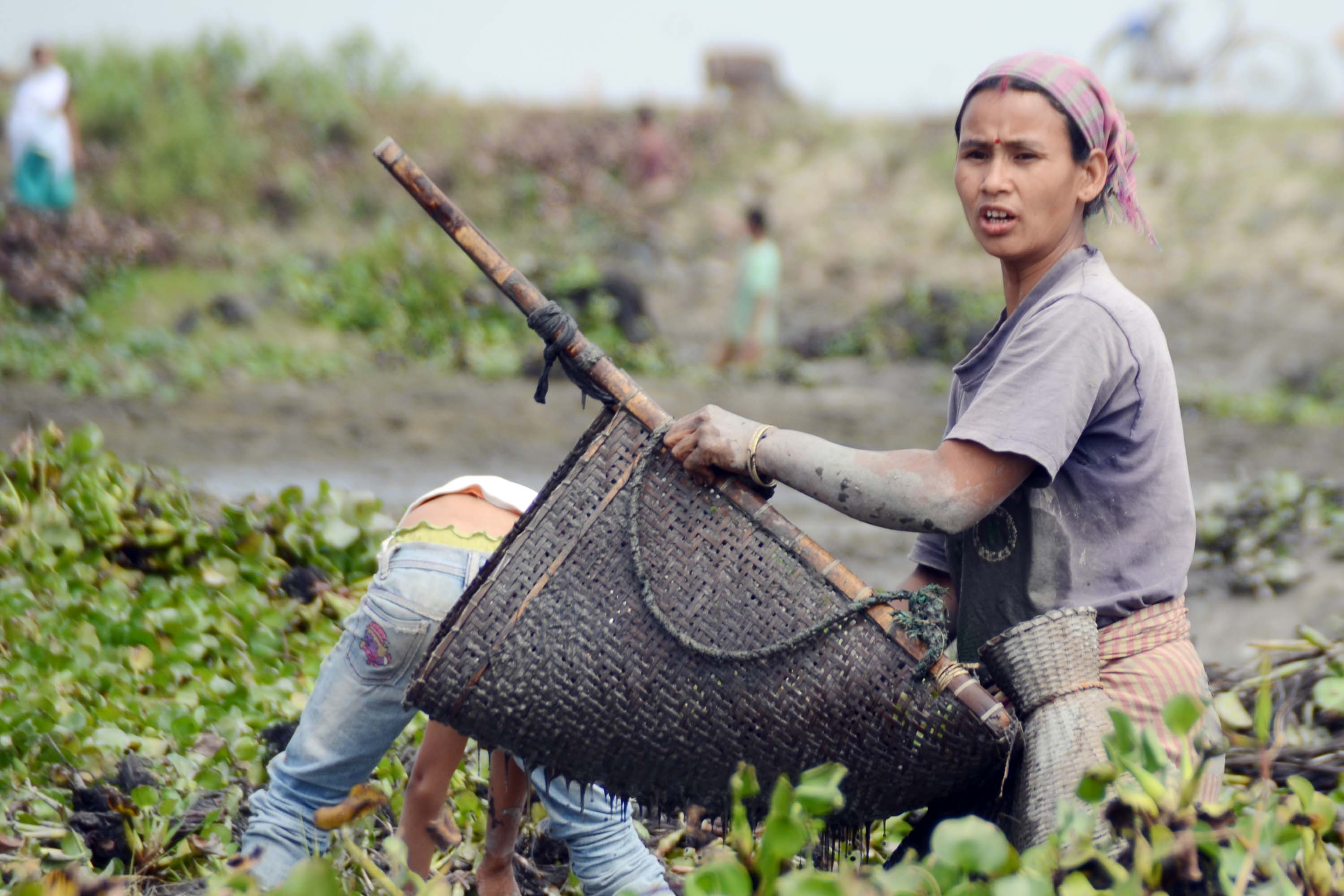
Tiwa tribal woman of Meghalaya

Meghalaya was previously part of Assam, but on 21 January 1972 the districts of Garo, Khasi and Jaintia hills became the new state of Meghalaya. Meghalaya, uniting the Khasi-Jainta and Garo districts, was the only state formed of more than one district, and as early as 1975 tensions were emerging between the Khasis and Garos. Meghalaya is bounded to the south and west by Bangladesh and to the north and east by Assam. The state is the wettest region of India, with an average of 12,000 mm (470 in) of rain a year. Due to its rugged terrain, the British imperial authorities called the region the "Scotland of the East". The state is covered by the Meghalaya subtropical forests ecoregion Its mountain forests are distinct from the lowland tropical forests to the north and south. As of 2001 about 70% of the state was forested.

As of 2005 about 85.53% of the population of Meghalaya were members of scheduled tribes. English is the official language. The other principal languages spoken include Khasi, Garo, Pnar, Biate, Hajong, Assamese and Bengali. Unlike many Indian states, Meghalaya has historically followed a matrilineal system where the lineage and inheritance are traced through women; the youngest daughter inherits all wealth and she also takes care of her parents. The economy is mostly agrarian, with a significant commercial forestry industry. The important crops are potatoes, rice, maize, pineapples, bananas, papayas, spices, etc. The state is geologically rich in minerals, but it has no significant industries.

=== Arunachal Pradesh ===
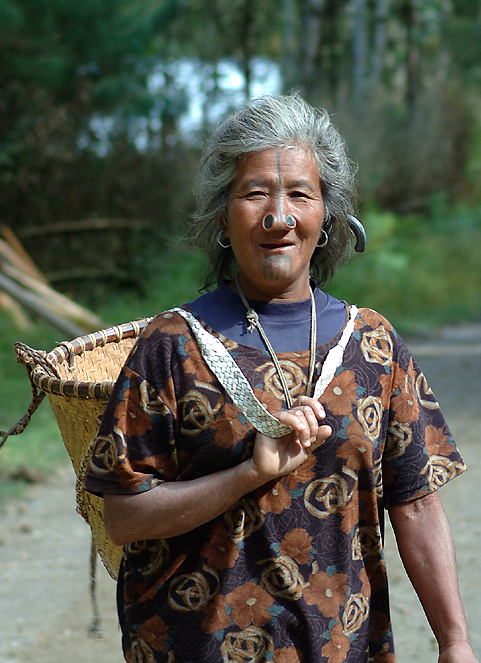
Apatani tribal Woman going to field in Lower Subansiri, Arunachal Pradesh

Arunachal Pradesh, formerly the North-East Frontier Agency, is in the extreme northeast of India. It borders Assam and Nagaland to the south, Bhutan in the west, Myanmar in the east and is separated from China in the north by the McMahon Line. This line was agreed in 1914 between the Tibetan government and the British colonial government, but was not accepted by the Chinese. During the Sino-Indian War of 1962 the Chinese occupied most of Arunachal Pradesh, but in November 1962 withdrew to positions behind the McMahon line. The North East Frontier Agency became the union territory of Arunachal Pradesh on 20 January 1972. Arunachal Pradesh was formed from the frontier tracts as an administrative convenience, with much less political activity by the people than elsewhere in the northeast. Arunachal Pradesh became a state on 20 February 1987.

Arunachal Pradesh covers a part of the Himalayas, with its highest elevation being 7,000 metres (23,000 ft). The terrain is cut by river valleys, including those of the Kameng, Subansiri, Siang (Brahmaputra), Dibang, Lohit and Dihing rivers. The climate varies from humid subtropical in the lower areas to alpine at the highest elevations. The economy is mostly based on agriculture, with the tribal groups practicing shifting cultivation. Forest products are also important. There is a large hydroelectric potential.

As of 2005 about 63.66% of the population were members of scheduled tribes. The remainder are mostly immigrants from Bengal or the Hindi Belt. The state is home to various Tibeto-Burman speaking Tribes. Monpa people live near the border with Bhutan to the west, Tani people and Mishmi people in the center, Jingpo, Naga and Lisu people in the area bordering Myanmar to the east and Naga people in the area bordering Nagaland in the south. There are transition zones on the borders where the Bugun, Hruso, Miji and Sherdukpen people form cultural "buffers" between the Tibetic Buddhist tribes and the Tani hill tribes. In addition, there are isolated peoples scattered throughout the state.

=== Manipur ===
Manipur is bounded by Myanmar to the southeast and east, Nagaland to the north, Assam to the west and Mizoram to the south. About 90% of the area is mountainous, surrounding the central valley sloping to the south. Forests, mostly open, cover 77.4% of the state. Around 70% of the population of Manipur depend on agriculture. Handloom weaving is an important cottage industry.

The history of the Kingdom of Manipur dates back to 33 A.D. The British designated Manipur a "subordinate native state" in 1891, and in 1907 stated that the hill people were dependent on the Maharajah of Manipur. Manipur was the scene of the Kuki Rebellion 1917–1919 in which the Kukis in the hills conducted a tenacious guerrilla war against the British, and only yielded when the British threatened to completely destroy their settlements. In 1947 Manipur adopted a constitution that provided for universal adult suffrage and placed limitations on the king's power. Also in 1947 the king signed an Instrument of Accession with India, to take effect in 1949.

Hijam Irabot Singh (1896–1951) opposed the merger of Manipur with India and proposed creation of a Purbanchal republic that would comprise Manipur, Tripura, Cachar and the Mizo hills. It would also include the Kabaw Valley, which had been ceded to Myanmar. On 15 October 1949 Manipur became part of the Indian Union as a part "C" State. It became a Union Territory in 1956. In 1972 Manipur became a full state. Manipur was not included in the Eighth Schedule until 1992.

As of 2005 about 34.41% of the population were members of scheduled tribes. The hill tribes of Manipur included Naga tribes in the areas next to Nagaland, and Kuki and Mizo tribes in areas next to Mizoram. The umbrella terms "Naga" and "Kuki" in the first list of schedule tribes were not accepted by the tribes, who insisted on a change to the list in 1965 under which they were designated by their names. Only the Thadou tribe retained the Kuki name.

The Meiteis are the majority ethnic group in Manipur, but occupied only a tenth of the land and were not allowed to buy land in the hill areas. By contrast, the hill tribes could buy land, and as scheduled tribes had better opportunities for employment in the public sector. This led the Meiteis responding by reviving their traditional culture and religion, protesting the presence and special powers of armed forces in the area, and forming militant separatist groups with links to other such groups in Myanmar and Northeast India. These included the United National Liberation Front, Peoples Liberation Army and Peoples Revolutionary Party of Kangleipak, and fought an urban or semi-urban guerrilla war in the Imphal valley.

Faced with simultaneous uprisings in the plains and by the Kukis of the hill regions, in 2008 the Indian Army signed a Suspension of Operation agreement with eight Kuki groups in the hope that they could be used against the rebel groups in the valley. Active groups in Manipur in 2009 included the People's Revolutionary Party of Kangleipak, the Military Council faction of the Kangleipak Communist Party, the People's United Liberation Front, the People's Liberation Army and the Kuki Revolutionary Army. The areas bordering Nagaland were affected by the National Socialist Council of Nagaland-Isak-Muivah (NSCN-IM).

=== Tripura ===
The princely state of Tripura included the hills of the present state of Tripura and the plains of Chakla Roshanabad, now part of Bangladesh. The hills were inhabited by indigenous tribes, migrants from Myanmar and the Chittagong Hill Tracts, and Lusheis on the border with Mizoram. After the partition of India most of the Hindu Bengalis of the princely state moved to the Indian area of the Tripura hills, where they settled in lands used for shifting cultivation by the tribal people, and came to dominate politics. Many of the Muslim Bengalis of Tripura left for East Pakistan.

Shibani Kinkar Chaube wrote of Tripura in 1975, "After partition Bengalis have far outnumbered the tribals, who are in a miserable stage of battle for survival, expressed through occasional violence and leftist politics." In 1988 one faction of the Tripura National Volunteers signed a Memorandum of Understanding with the Tripura State Government and the Government of India. However, other factions formed the dissenting National Liberation Front of Tripura and the All-Tripura Tiger Force, which were both active as of 2008. As of 2005 about 30% of the population were members of scheduled tribes. There were ongoing conflicts between the tribal and non-tribal peoples of Tripura.

=== Assam ===
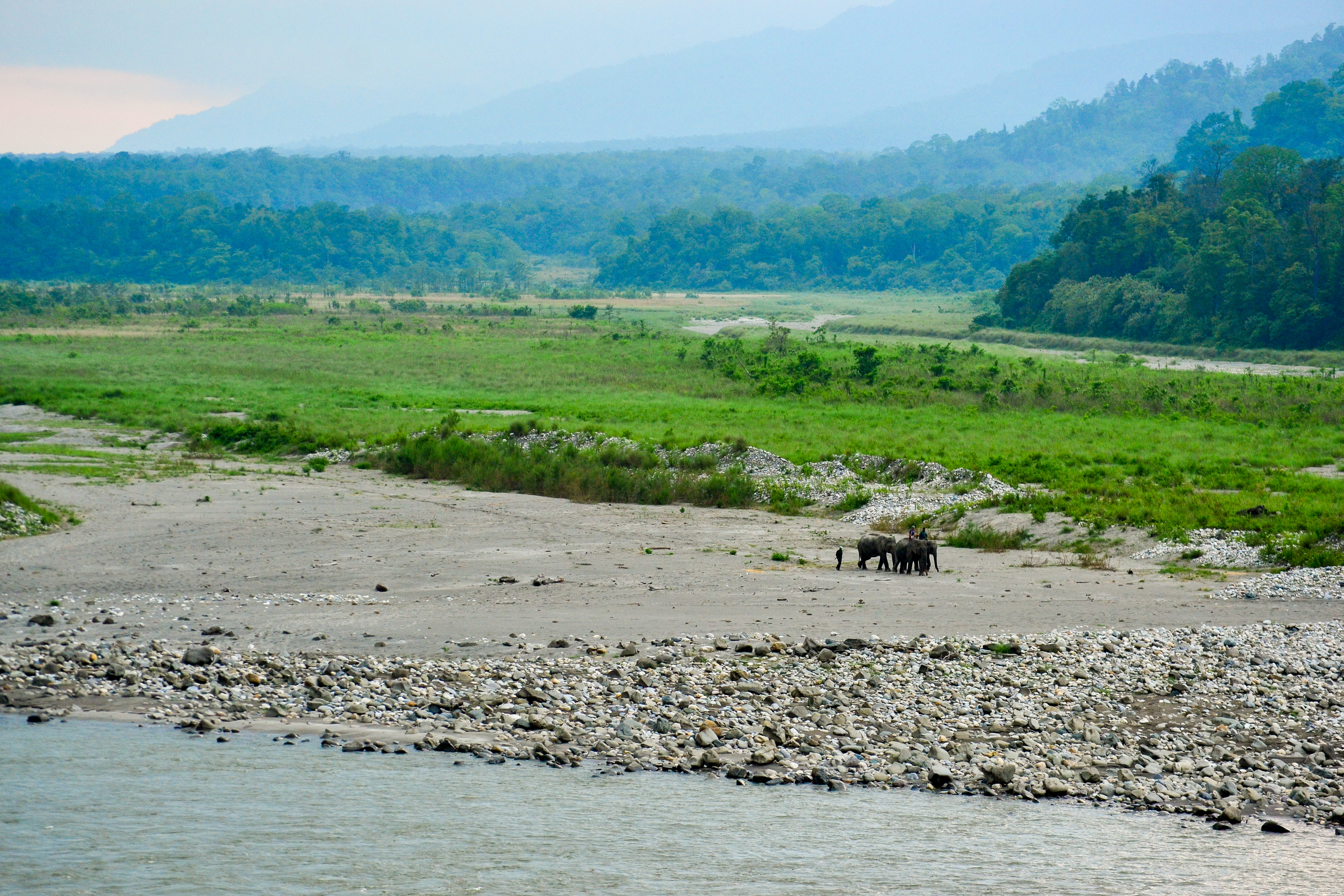
Foothills of the Himalayas seen from the Manas National Park, Assam

Assam covers the plains of the upper portion of the flood plain of the Brahmaputra River, which flows from east to west before entering Bangladesh, where it turns to the south. The south of the state includes the plains of the Barak River basin. This river originates in the Manipur hills and flows south through the mountains of Manipur to Tipaimukh, where it makes a hairpin turn and flows north along the Manipur-Assam border to Jirimat near Lakhipur, then west through the Cachar district of Assam before entering Bangladesh. The Brahmaputra and Barak basins are separated by the Karbi Anglong and North Cachar Hills.

The main ethnic group in the fertile Brahmaputra valley are the mainly Hindu Assamese people. At time of the partition of India, the Cachar district of Assam was dominated by Bengalis, and there were large Bengali populations throughout the Brahmaputra valley, swelled by Hindu refugees from East Pakistan.

As of 2005 about 12.69% of the population were members of scheduled tribes. This is higher that the national average of 8%. It includes plains tribes such as the Bodo people, who are also agitating for autonomy. (Note: The Bodo people are recognized as a plains tribe under the Sixth Schedule. The All-Bodo Students Union (ABSU) signed a Memorandum of Settlement with the Assam State Government in 1993, resulting in formation of the Bodoland Autonomous Council. Its members did not all support the agreement. Some disarmed as agreed, but others formed the breakaway Bodo Liberation Tigers. The jurisdiction of the Bodo Autonomous Council was to be based on ethnicity, but it proved difficult to determine which ethnic groups lived in each area, and the Bodos used force to drive out other ethnic groups from villages they wanted. An agreement was signed in 2003 with the Bodo Liberation Tigers, but this did not include the stronger National Democratic Front of Bodoland (NDFB).) There are ongoing separatist movements by the hill tribes of Assam in the North Cachar Hills and the Karbi Anglong. In 2009 insurgent groups in Assam included the United Liberation Front of Asom, the Karbi Longri NC Hills Liberation Front and the Black Widow group.

=== Sikkim ===
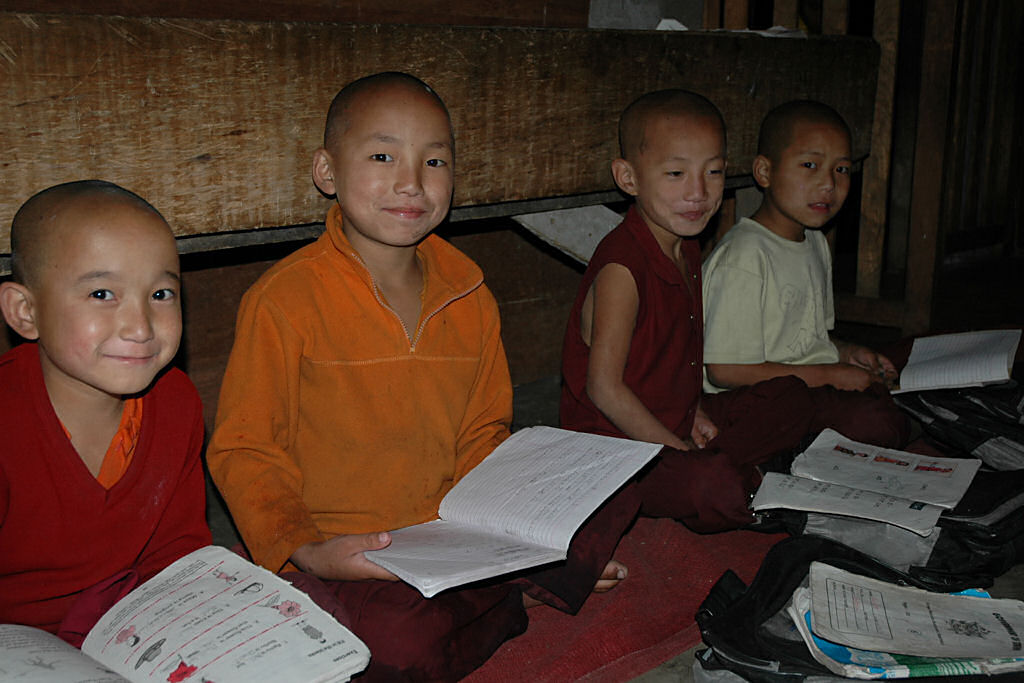
School near Mangan, Sikkim that combines regular curriculum with Buddhist studies

Sikkim is in the eastern Himalayas, bounded by Nepal to the east, Tibet to the north, Bhutan to the east and West Bengal to the south. Depending on altitude, the climate ranges from subtropical to alpine. The highest peak is Kangchenjunga at 8,586 metres (28,169 ft), the third highest in the world.

The first Bhutia King of the Namgyal dynasty was installed in Sikkim in 1642. In the years that followed "Greater Sikkim" was established in the eastern Himalayas. After 1700 the kingdom went into steady decline. The remainder of the kingdom was divided between China and Britain in 1890 in a convention signed in Calcutta. In 1950 Sikkim became a protectorate of independent India. The monarchy was deposed in 1975 and Sikkim became the 22nd state of India. Sikkim was integrated as the eighth North Eastern Council state in 2002.

The official languages are English, Nepali, Sikkimese and Lepcha. Additional languages include Gurung, Limbu, Magar, Mukhia, Newari, Rai, Sherpa and Tamang. The main religion is Hinduism, practiced by the Nepalese, followed by Buddhism, practiced by the Tibetans and Bhutias. Sikkim's economy is largely dependent on agriculture. Crops include rice, maize, tea, soybean, ginger, orange, pears, potato, tomato and cardamoms. Tourists attracted by the mountain scenery are also a source of income. The state has the highest earnings per person among the North-Eastern states.

== See also ==
- Hill people
- List of Scheduled Tribes in India

== Sources ==
- 50th Report of the Commissioner for Linguistic Minorities in India (PDF), 16 July 2014, p. 109, archived from the original (PDF) on 2018-01-02
- Barak Basin, Water Resources Systems Division, National Institute of Hydrology, archived from the original on 2017-05-15
- Bareh, Hamlet (2001), Encyclopaedia of North-East India: Mizoram, Mittal Publications, ISBN 978-81-7099-792-4
- All India Population and Total ST Population-Male&Female (Census 2011) (PDF), Ministry of Tribal Affairs, 2013
- Population by religious communities, Census India
- Donn Morgan Kipgen, The great Kuki rebellion of 1917-19: Its real significances, (Courtesy: The Sangai Express
- "Famous History and Historical Information on North East India", North-east-india.com, archived from the original on 2018-06-27
- Gupta, A.K. (December 2000), "Shifting Cultivation and Conservation of Biological Diversity in Tripura, Northeast India", Human Ecology, 28 (4), Springer: 605–629, doi:10.1023/A:1026491831856, JSTOR 4603374, S2CID 153323209
- Kaminsky, Arnold P.; Long, Roger D. (2011), India Today: An Encyclopedia of Life in the Republic, ISBN 978-0313374623
- Karlsson, Bengt G. (2013), "Evading the State: Ethnicity in Northeast India through the Lens of James Scott", Asian Ethnology, 72 (2, Performing Identity Politics and Culture in Northeast India and Beyond), Nanzan University: 321–331, JSTOR 23595482
- Khawtinkhuma; Vanthuama (26 April 1947), Memorandum Submitted to His Majesty's Government, Government of India and its Constituent Assembly Through the Advisory Sub-committee by the Mizo Union, True Copy via Zogam.org, archived from the original on 2012-02-07
- Kumar, Nikhlesh (May–August 2005), "Identity Politics in the Hill Tribal Communities in the North-Eastern India", Sociological Bulletin, 54 (2), Indian Sociological Society: 195–217, doi:10.1177/0038022920050203, JSTOR 23620497, S2CID 147920779
- Lloyd, J.M. (1991), History of the Church in Mizoram: Harvest in the Hills, Aizawl, Mizoram: Synod Publication Board, OCLC 29798339
- "Manipur (IMPHAL)", knowindia.gov.in, archived from the original on August 21, 2017
- Meenaxi Barkataki-Ruscheweyh; Andrea Lauser (2013), "Editors' Introduction: Performing Identity Politics and Culture in Northeast India and Beyond", Asian Ethnology, 72 (2, Performing Identity Politics and Culture in Northeast India and Beyond), Nanzan University: 189–197, JSTOR 23595475
- Meghalaya: Abode of Clouds (PDF), IBEF: India Brand Equity Foundation, March 2013, archived from the original (PDF) on 2013-09-03
- Meghalaya and Its Forests, Forest & Environment Department, Government of Meghalaya, 2012, archived from the original on 2014-08-22
- Nayak, Purusottam (12 October 2013), Some Facts and Figures on Development Attainments in Nagaland (PDF), North Eastern Hill University, archived from the original (PDF) on 2014-07-12
- Nityananda Kalita (2011), "Resolving Ethnic Conflict in Northeast India", Proceedings of the Indian History Congress, 72, PART–II, Indian History Congress: 1354–1367, JSTOR 44145746
- Prakash, C.V. (2006), 'Encyclopedia of Northeast India, vol. 5, Atlantic Publishers, ISBN 978-8126907076
- Rammathot Khongreiwo (October–December 2009), "Understanding the Histories of Peoples on the Margins: A Critique of "Northeast India's Durable Disorder"", Alternatives: Global, Local, Political, 34 (4), Sage Publications, Inc.: 437–454, doi:10.1177/030437540903400404, JSTOR 40645285, S2CID 145276020
- Scott, James (2009), The art of not being governed: An anarchist history of upland Southeast Asia, Yale University Press, ISBN 9780300156522
- Shibani Kinkar Chaube (Autumn 1975), "Interethnic Politics in Northeast India", International Review of Modern Sociology, 5 (2): 193–200, JSTOR 41421530
- Sikkim, First 100% organic state in the world, Invest India
- "Sikkim Official Languages Bill 1977" (PDF), Sikkim Government Gazette, Governor of Sikkim, p. 100, 16 September 1977, archived from the original (PDF) on 2018-07-22
- Sikkim Religions, BharatOnline.com
- "Sikkim to become eighth North-East Council state soon". Times of India. 10 December 2002.
- Swarna Rajagopalan (2008), "Reading Maps, Seeking Directions", Report Title: Peace Accords in Northeast India: Journey over Milestones, East-West Center, JSTOR resrep06521.9
