= Nirupam Chakma =

Indian politicia

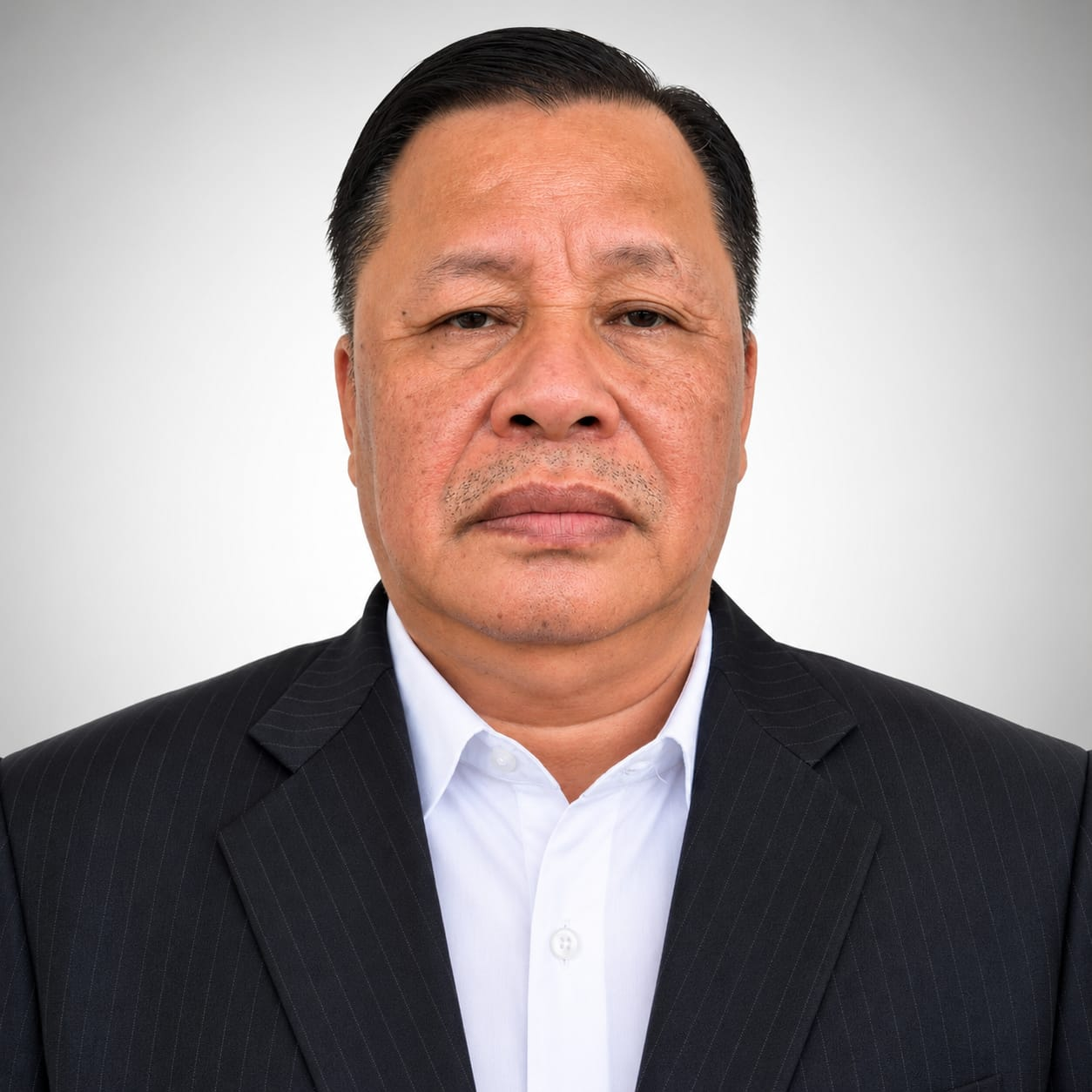
- Chakma in 2026

Chief Executive Member of the Chakma Auonomous District Council
- In office 3 July 2026 – Incumbent

Member of the National Commission for Scheduled Tribes
- In office 8 March 2024-2027

Member of the Mizoram Legislative Assembly
- In office 1986-2013
- Constituency: Tuichawng

Member of the Chakma Autonomous District Council
- In office 2023-2028

Personal details
- Born: 16 December 1958 (age 67) Kamalanagar, Mizoram
- Party: Indian National Congress, Bharatiya Janata Party
- Website: www.cadc.gov.in

Nirupam Chakma is an Indian politician from Mizoram. He represented Tuichawng in the Mizoram Legislative Assembly from 1986 to 2013. Formerly a Congress minister, he joined the Bharatiya Janata Party in 2015 and was offered the BJP ticket to the lone Lok Sabha seat of Mizoram in the 2019 election. He was the first Minister in Mizoram from the Chakma Community.

Currently, he is the Chief Executive Member of the 11th Chakma Autonomous District Council (2023 - 2028).

On March 8, 2024 he was appointed a member of the National Commission for Scheduled Tribes by the President of India.

He also holds the post of National President of the Chakma National Council of India (CNCI).
