= Borapansury - I =

Borapansury I is an Indian village in Chawngte Block of Lawngtlai district, part of the Chakma Autonomous District Council, in Mizoram, India.

== See also ==
- Borapansury
