= Sixth Schedule to the Constitution of India =

On autonomy to Scheduled Tribes in Northeast India

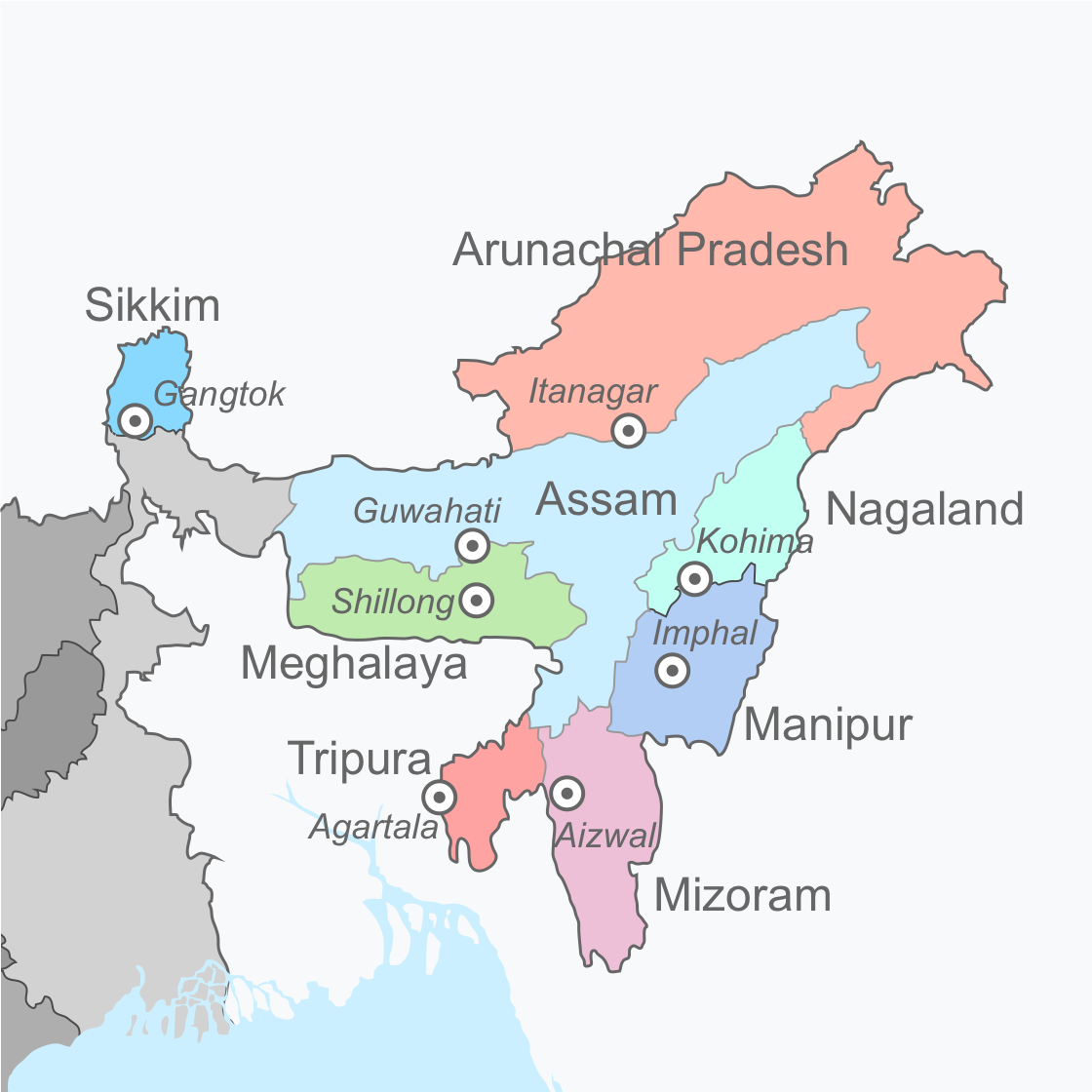
Northeast India

The Sixth Schedule to the Constitution of India provides measures of autonomy and self-governance to the Scheduled Tribes in the hill regions of Northeast India.

== Overview ==
During the British Raj, the frontier regions of the Assam province populated by tribal communities were designated as "excluded areas" or "partially excluded areas". The North-East Frontier Tracts (present-day Arunachal Pradesh), the Naga Hills district (present-day Nagaland) and the Lushai Hills district (present-day Mizoram) were designated as "excluded areas", while the Khasi and Jaintia Hills region (in present-day Meghalaya) was designated as a "partially excluded area". The "exclusion" worked in both directions. The tribes were excluded from the legislature and the governance mechanisms of the Assam province. At the same time, the laws created for the province were excluded from application to the tribal areas. Essentially, the tribes governed themselves via their traditional systems, except for being asked to participate in the imperial interests such as taxation and road-building.

During the formulation of the Constitution of India, the Sixth Schedule was devised to continue these modes of governance, providing the tribes autonomy and to allow them to continue their own traditional systems of self-governance. The tribal areas in other parts of India were covered by a parallel Fifth Schedule with somewhat weaker forms of autonomy. The difference was justified by B. R. Ambedkar in the following words:

The tribal people in areas other than Assam are more or less Hinduised, more or less assimilated with the civilisation and culture of the majority of the people in whose midst they live. With regard to the tribals in Assam that is not the case. Their roots are still in their own civilisation and their own culture. They have not adopted, mainly or in a large part, either the modes or the manners of the Hindus who surround them. Their laws of inheritance, their laws of marriage, customs and so on are quite different from that of the Hindus. I think that is the main distinction which influenced us to have a different sort of scheme for Assam from the one we have provided for other territories.

Autonomous district councils were granted under the Sixth Schedule to the following regions in the-then Assam state:

- Under 'Part A', the United Khasi-Jaintia Hills and Garo Hills (which are now in Meghalaya), North Cachar Hills and Mikir Hills (which continue to be in Assam), Lushai Hills (present day Mizoram) and Naga Hills (present day Nagaland).
- Under 'Part B', the North-East Frontier Tracts (now in Arunachal Pradesh) and Naga Tribal Areas (now in Nagaland).

The 'Part A' regions were considered more developed and where democratic institutions could function, while 'Part B' regions were considered to be still in primitive stages at the time of establishment of the Indian constitution. The latter were administered under the discretionary powers of the Governor of Assam. Manipur and Tripura, having been princely states separate from the province of Assam, did not obtain the benefit of the Sixth Schedule, even though similar considerations might have applied to them.

When Naga Hills and Lushai Hills became states of India (as Nagaland and Mizoram respectively), these provisions became redundant for the states as a whole. However minority tribal districts in these states were granted the Sixth Schedule provisions in course of time. The North-East Frontier Tracts also became the state of Arunachal Pradesh. When Meghalaya was carved out of Assam, the Garo Hills, Khasi Hills and Jaintia Hills retained their Sixth Schedule status.

The state of Tripura formed an autonomous district council for its tribal areas in 1982 and requested that they be brought under the Sixth Schedule, which was granted in 1984.

== Sixth Schedule districts ==
There are 10 Sixth Schedule districts in India.

List of Sixth Schedule districts
Sl. No.	Autonomous Council	State/UT	Headquarters	Formation
1	Bodoland Territorial Council	Assam	Kokrajhar	2003
2	North Cachar Hills Autonomous Council	Assam	Haflong	1951
3	Karbi Anglong Autonomous Council	Assam	Diphu	1952
4	Garo Hills Autonomous District Council	Meghalaya	Tura	1973
5	Jaintia Hills Autonomous District Council	Meghalaya	Jowai	1973
6	Khasi Hills Autonomous District Council	Meghalaya	Shillong	1973
7	Chakma Autonomous District Council	Mizoram	Kamalanagar	1972
8	Lai Autonomous District Council	Mizoram	Lawngtlai	1972
9	Mara Autonomous District Council	Mizoram	Siaha	1972
10	Tripura Tribal Areas Autonomous District Council	Tripura	Khumulwng	1982

== Bibliography ==
- Doungel, Jangkhongam (2022), "The Sixth Schedule to the constitution of India: Emergence and development", in M. Amarjeet Singh (ed.), Autonomy and Democratic Governance in Northeast India, Routledge, pp. 17–33, doi:10.4324/9781003158417-3, ISBN 9781003158417
- Kom, Skholal (January–March 2010). "Identity and Governance: Demand for Sixth Schedule in Manipur". Indian Journal of Political Science. LXXI (1): 313–322. JSTOR 42748389.
- Haokip, Thongkholal (September 2017). "Dereliction of Duties or the Politics of 'Political Quadrangle'? The Governor, Hill Areas Committee and Upsurge in the Hills of Manipur". Indian Journal of Public Administration. 63 (3): 456–474. doi:10.1177/0019556117720606. S2CID 158347359.
- Piang, L. Lam Khan (13 April 2019). "Institutional Exclusion of the Hill Tribes in Manipur: Demand for Protection under the Sixth Schedule". Economic and Political Weekly. 54 (15). ProQuest 2209626765.
- Umdor, Sumarbin; Vanlalhruaitluanga, K. (9 December 2023). "All is not well in the Sixth Schedule - A Reaction to the Demand for the Sixth Schedule in Ladakh". Economic and Political Weekly. 58 (49).
