= West Tuipui Assembly constituency =

Constituency of the Mizoram legislative assembly in India

Coordinates: 22.956°N 92.488°E

West Tuipui
- Constituency No. 35 for the Mizoram Legislative Assembly
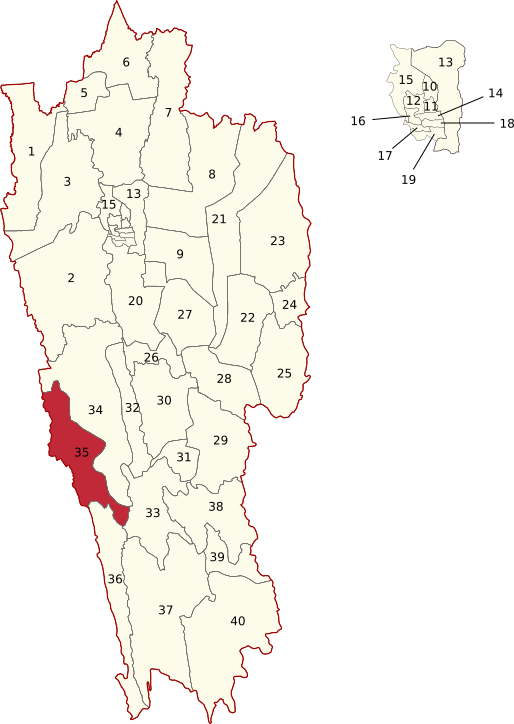

Constituency details
- Country: India
- Region: Northeast India
- State: Mizoram
- District: Lunglei
- Lok Sabha constituency: Mizoram
- Established: 2008
- Total electors: 12,470
- Reservation: ST

Member of Legislative Assembly
- 9th Mizoram Legislative Assembly
- Incumbent Prova Chakma
- Party: Mizo National Front
- Elected year: 2023

West Tuipui Legislative Assembly constituency is one of the 40 Legislative Assembly constituencies of Mizoram state in India.

It is part of Lunglei district and is reserved for candidates belonging to the Scheduled Tribes.

== Members of the Legislative Assembly ==
Year	Name	Party
2008	Nihar Kanti Chakma	Indian National Congress
2013	Nihar Kanti Chakma	Indian National Congress
2018	Nihar Kanti Chakma	Indian National Congress
2023	Prova Chakma	Mizo National Front

== Election results ==
=== 2023 ===
2023 Mizoram Legislative Assembly election: West Tuipui
Party	Candidate	Votes	%	±%
MNF	Prova Chakma	7,167	48.62	
INC	Nihar Kanti Chakma	6,456	43.80	
ZPM	Kawlhnuna	789	5.35	
BJP	T. Lalengthanga	250	1.70	
NOTA	None of the Above	78	0.53	
Majority		711	4.82	
Turnout		14,740		
MNF gain from INC		Swing		

=== 2018 ===
2018 Mizoram Legislative Assembly election: West Tuipui
Party	Candidate	Votes	%	±%
INC	Nihar Kanti Chakma			
NOTA	None of the Above			
Majority				
Turnout				
		Swing		
