= Damdep-I =

Village in Mizoram, India

Coordinates: 22.285°N 92.598°E

Damdep-I (also known as New Jognasury-I) is a village located in the southern part of the Chakma Autonomous District Council in the Lawngtlai District of the state of Mizoram, India.

== Religion ==
The village has its own monastery called Sadhanagiri Buddha Vihar.

== Politics ==
The governance of Damdep-I is carried out through the Village Executive Committee, which consists of the Village Council President (VCP), five members, and a Dakkhirani. The village falls under the 16-Damdep MDC Constituency, which comprises seven village councils, including Damdep-I, Damdep-III, Dursora, Chotoguisury-I, Chotoguisury-II, Fulsora, and Silbanga. The present Member of District Council (MDC) representing the 16-Damdep MDC constituency is Dangu Hiranand Tongchangya.
