= Amit Kumar Chakma =

Indian politician

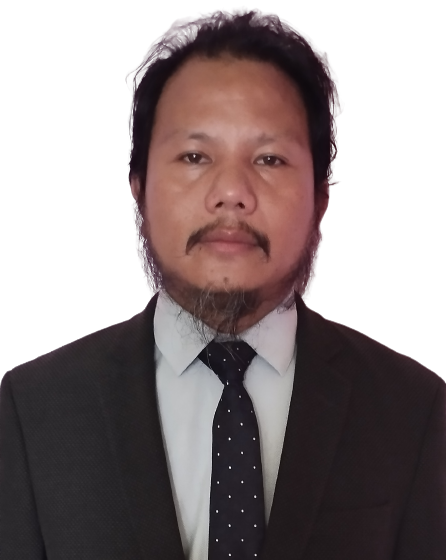
- Amit Kumar Chakma in 2023.

Chief Executive Member of the Chakma Autonomous District Council
- In office 6 November 2017 – 21 March 2018
- Preceded by: Kali Kumar Tongchangya
- Succeeded by: Governor's Rule
- Constituency: Rengkashya

Executive Member
- In office 2013–2017

Member
- In office 2018–2023

Personal details
- Born: 2 April 1984 Rengkashya, Mizoram, India
- Died: 4 May 2023 (aged 39)
- Other political affiliations: MNF, BJP
- Website: www.cadc.gov.in

Amit Kumar Chakma (1984-2023) was an Indian politician and the former Chief Executive Member of the Chakma Autonomous District Council, an autonomous region in Mizoram from 6 November 2017 to 21 March 2018.

Chakma was first elected as an MDC in 2013 from Rengkashya constituency on an INC ticket. He was again re-elected in 2018 from same constituency. After switching over to Mizo National Front (MNF), he was denied ticket and then he had joined the BJP in 2023 which chose him as its official candidate from Rengkashya constituency.

== Biography ==
Amit Kumar Chakma was born to Late Balabadra Chakma, a resident of Rengkashya under Chakma Autonomous District Council. He was the president of the Chakma District Congress Committee from 6 November 2017 to 21 March 2018.

== Cause of Death ==
Amit Kumar Chakma was killed by his political opponent Prema Ranjan Chakma, official MNF candidate and his brother Chitra Ranjan Chakma, who later died in a car accident within a year of the shocking incident; with aides Rupayan Chakma, his nephew and notorious Ananta Jivon Chakma on 4 May 2023 at Lokkisury village while he was in election campaign.
