= Molin Kumar Chakma =

Indian politician

Chief Executive Member of the Chakma Autonomous District Council
- In office 28 January 2025 – 16 June 2025
- Preceded by: Rasik Mohan Chakma
- Succeeded by: Governor's Rule
- Constituency: Bajeisora

Personal details
- Party: Bharatiya Janata Party (2022-Present)
- Other political affiliations: Mizo National Front

Molin Kumar Chakma is an Indian politician from Mizoram, India. He was elected as Chief Executive Member of the Chakma Autonomous District Council (CADC) in 2025. Molin Kumar Chakma was elected from Bajeisora constituency as a MDC in 2023 on a BJP ticket.

== Political career ==
Chakma was an active politician of Mizo National Front until he joined Bharatiya Janata Party on 16 September 2022. In 2023 Chakma Autonomous District Council elections he won from Bajeisora constituency. On 28 January 2025, Chakma was appointed as Chief Executive Member of Chakma Autonomous District Council.
