= Boroituli =

Coordinates: 22.288°N 92.613°E

Boroituli is an Indian village in Lawngtlai district and Mizoram State. The population is approximately 400 people, and is ethnically composed of both Chakma and Tongchangya peoples. It is situated near the River Thega and as per the map of Chakma Autonomous District Council (CADC) the River Thega lies to the west (which borders on Bangladesh), New Jagnasury to east, Jaruldubosora to the north, and New Chippui to its south. It is in the eastern region of the CADC. Agriculture and the cultivation of Jhum are the main sources of subsistence. Boroituli contains a co-educational primary and middle school, which as of 2016 catered for a student body of boys and girls, with a staff.

== Recent history ==
In August 2016, it was assessed as being owed compensation (with '234 victims') for the Indo-Bangla fence.
