= Rasik Mohan Chakma =

Indian politician (born 1964)

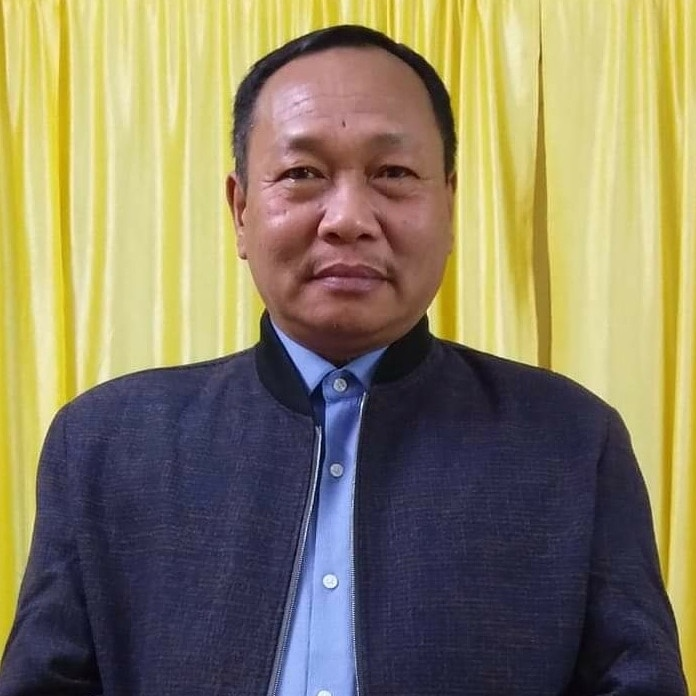
- Chakma in 2018

Chief Executive Member of the Chakma Autonomous District Council
- In office 22 May 2023 – 23 December 2024
- Succeeded by: Molin Kumar Chakma
- In office 9 October 2021 – 2 June 2022
- Preceded by: Durjya Dhan Chakma
- Succeeded by: Buddha Lila Chakma
- Constituency: Borapansury I

Member of the Mizoram Legislative Assembly 2003-2006
- In office 2003–2006
- Preceded by: Nirupam Chakma
- Succeeded by: Alak Bikash Chakma
- Constituency: Tuichawng

Member of the Mizoram Legislative Assembly 2023-2026
- In office 2023–2026
- Constituency: Tuichawng

Personal details
- Born: 1964 (age 61–62) Borapansury, Mizoram, India
- Party: Mizo National Front
- Education: NEHU
- Website: www.cadc.gov.in

Rasik Mohan Chakma (born 1964) is an Indian politician and member of the Mizoram Legislative Assembly from the Tuichang Assembly constituency since 2023. He was the Chief Executive Member of the Chakma Autonomous District Council, an autonomous region in Mizoram. He is a resident of Borapansury I, Lawngtlai district. He was the founding president of the Chakma District Mizo National Front (CDMNF).

== Early life and education ==
Chakma was born in 1964 in Borapansury, Mizoram to the late Sukra Moni Chakma.

Before joining active politics, he served as a Post Master in Mizoram. He completed his graduation from Lunglei Government College (NEHU) in 1988.

== Political career ==
He has been representing the Borapansury I MDC constituency as a member in the Executive Committee of Chakma Autonomous District Council since 1993, except after the 9th general election to Chakma Autonomous District Council held in 2013, which he lost to Dayal Chandra Chakma.

Following the 2003 general election to the Mizoram Legislative Assembly, he represented the Tuichawng Assembly constituency.

Rasik Mohan Chakma was a Member of the Chakma Autonomous District Council from Mizo National Front. Under his leader, the Mizo National Front has formed several MNF-led governments in the Chakma Autonomous District Council. He became the Chief Executive Member (CEM) of the Chakma Autonomous District Council (CADC) from 14 October 2021 by overthrowing Shri Durjya Dhan Chakma until 24 December 2024.

He has served as the Chairman of Chakma Autonomous District Council.

He was the twentieth Chief Executive Member (CEM) of CADC.

== Positions held ==
- 2021–2024: Elected as the Chief Executive Member (CEM) of the Chakma Autonomous District Council (CADC).

== Role in the development of CADC ==
During his tenure as the Chief Executive Member of the CADC, projects including the Chawngte branch of State Bank of India and the long bridges of Chawngte L and Chawngte P were initiated, which serve as the main lifeline of the people of Chakma Autonomous District Council.
