= Zote people =

Tribe of the Hmar people in South Asia

Zote (Hmar, Joute)
Total population
- no census

Religion
- Christianity; folk religion

The Zote people are a sub-tribe of the Hmar people in India, Myanmar and Bangladesh.
