= Lai Autonomous District Council =

Government Federation

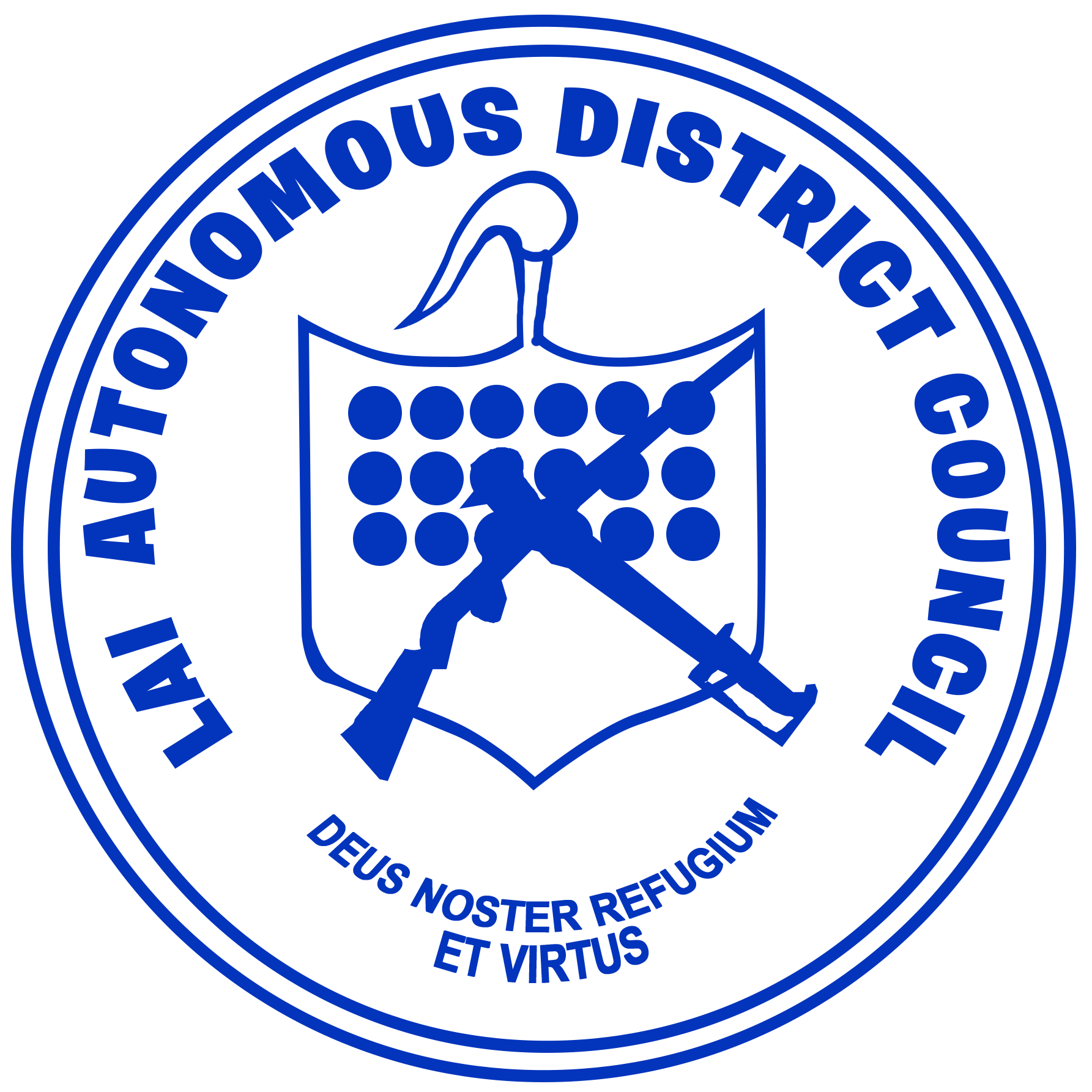

Type
- Type: Autonomous District Council

Leadership
- Chief Executive Member: C Lalsawmzuala, MNF
- Chairman: C Lalmuanthanga, INC

Structure
- Seats: 29 Councillors (25 Elected + 4 Nominated)
- Political groups: Government (16): MNF (8); INC (8); Opposition (9): ZPM (6); BJP (2); IND (1); Nominated (4): NOM (4)

Elections
- Voting system: 25 plurality voting
- Voting system: 4 nominated
- Last election: 3 December 2025
- Next election: 2030

Meeting place
- Lawngtlai, Mizoram

Website
- ladc.mizoram.gov.in

The Lai Autonomous District Council (LADC) is one of the three Autonomous District Councils in Mizoram state in north-east India. It covers the Lawngtlai, Bungtlang South and Sangau sub-divisions of the Lawngtlai district. It is an autonomous district council for the Lai people living in south-eastern Mizoram.

North Eastern autonomous divisions

The LADC's headquarters are in Lawngtlai town, which is the district capital of the Lawngtlai district.

== History ==
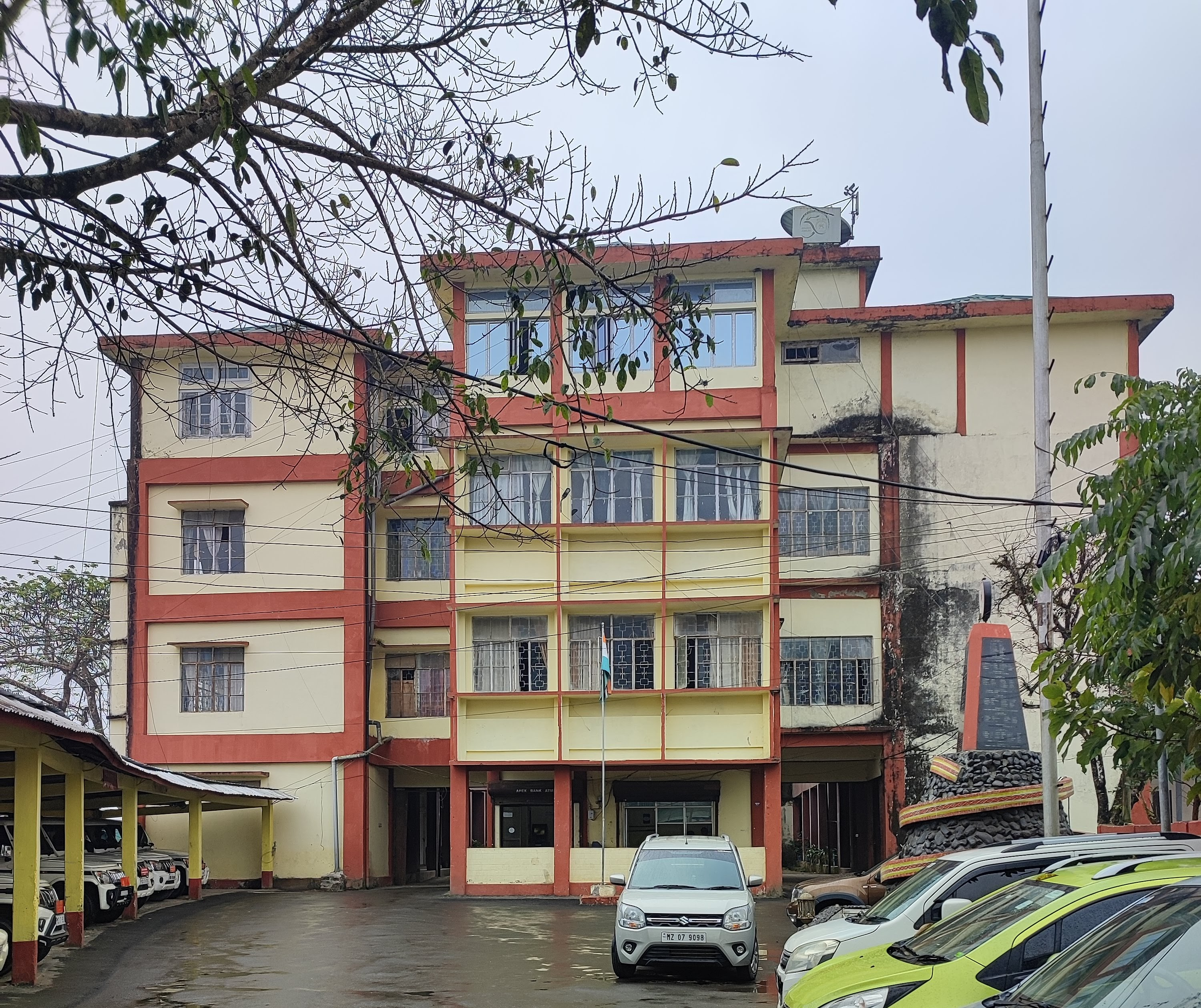
LADC Office

In 1954 the Central and Assam governments established a regional council, the Pawi Lakher Regional Council (PLRC), for the Lakher (a.k.a. Mara), Pawi (a.k.a. Lai), and Chakma peoples. However, the PLRC could not function properly from its beginning as there was no common language among the three tribal communities to understand each other. The first meeting was held where the language used was Lushai, but the Chakmas and Maras hardly understood anything, and the Maras boycotted PLRC meetings in 1958. In 1972, the issue was resolved by dividing the PLRC into three regional councils before becoming district councils.

== Structure ==
The Lai Autonomous District Council has a total strength of 29 members, out of which 25 are directly elected by the people and four are nominated by the governor on the recommendation of the chief executive member of the LADC.

== Jurisdiction ==
Lai Autonomous District Council has the jurisdiction in the following sub-divisions of Lawngtlai district:

- Lawngtlai Rural Development Block
- Bungtlang South Rural Development Block
- Sangau Rural Development Block

== Current members ==
Constituencies under Lai Autonomous District Council and their members as of 2025 election:

Chairperson: C Lalmuanthanga
| No. | Constituency | Councillor | Party | Remarks |
|---|---|---|---|---|
| 1 | Sangau East | B.N. Thangpuia | Bharatiya Janata Party | |
| 2 | Sangau South | J.B. Vanhoy | Mizo National Front | |
| 3 | Sangau West | Lalchuangliana | Bharatiya Janata Party | |
| 4 | Cheural | T. Lalchhuanvawra | Zoram People's Movement | |
| 5 | Lungtian | Sanghuliana Mualchin | Mizo National Front | |
| 6 | Lungpher South | C. Lalmuanthanga | Indian National Congress | |
| 7 | Vawmbuk | T. Zakunga | Zoram People's Movement | |
| 8 | Bualpui West | Lalzahawma Chinzah | Mizo National Front | |
| 9 | Bualpui East | K. Lalchhuanpuia | Zoram People's Movement | |
| 10 | Lawngtlai Bazar | Lalropuia Chinzah | Mizo National Front | |
| 11 | Lawngtlai Vengpui | C. Ngunlianchunga | Indian National Congress | |
| 12 | Lawngtlai Chandmary | C. Lalsawmzuala | Mizo National Front | |
| 13 | Council Veng | Lallura Chinzah | Zoram People's Movement | |
| 14 | Lawngtlai College Veng | C. Hrangthianga | Mizo National Front | |
| 15 | Lawngtlai - III | M.C. Lalbiakliana | Mizo National Front | |
| 16 | Lawngtlai AOC | L.R. Dingliana Chinzah | Zoram People's Movement | |
| 17 | Paithar | V. Zirsanga | Independent | |
| 18 | Diltlang South | H.C. Lalthawmliana | Mizo National Front | |
| 19 | Chawngte P | H.C. Lalengkima | Indian National Congress | |
| 20 | Sakeilui | Sukriti Chakma | Indian National Congress | |
| 21 | M. Kawnpui | Premo Kanti | Indian National Congress | |
| 22 | Bungtlang S | K. Lalramzauva | Zoram People's Movement | |
| 23 | Sekulh | J. Lalrawngbawla | Indian National Congress | |
| 24 | Tuithumhnar | H. Vanlaltanpuia | Indian National Congress | |
| 25 | Vathuampui | C. Lalneihkhuma | Indian National Congress | |
| 26 | Nominated | Lalzahawma Chinzah | Nominated | |
| 27 | Nominated | Lalhruaitluangi Vandir | Nominated | |
| 28 | Nominated | Zonunmawii | Nominated | |
| 29 | Nominated | Pu Lalthanmawia Colney | Nominated | |

== See also ==
- Chakma Autonomous District Council
- Mara Autonomous District Council
- Hill tribes of Northeast India
- Sinlung Hills Council
