= Borapansury =

Borapansury is a sub-town in Chawngte subdivision within Lawngtlai district of Indian state of Mizoram.

According to Census 2011 information the location code or village code of Borapansury I village is 271616. Borapansury I village is located in Chawngte subdivision of Lawngtlai district in Mizoram, India. It is situated 33km away from sub-district headquarter Chawngte (tehsildar office) and 130km away from district headquarter Lawngtlai.
