= Tuichawng Assembly constituency =

Constituency of the Mizoram legislative assembly in India

Coordinates: 22.92°N 92.53°E

Tuichawng
- Constituency No. 36 for the Mizoram Legislative Assembly
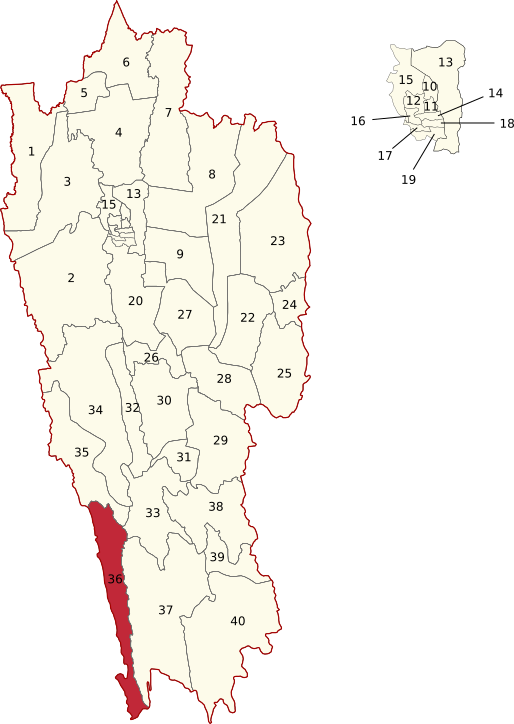

Constituency details
- Country: India
- Region: Northeast India
- State: Mizoram
- District: Lawngtlai
- Lok Sabha constituency: Mizoram
- Established: 2008
- Total electors: 26,272
- Reservation: ST

Member of Legislative Assembly
- 9th Mizoram Legislative Assembly
- Incumbent Rasik Mohan Chakma
- Party: Mizo National Front
- Elected year: 2023

Tuichawng is one of the 40 Legislative Assembly constituencies of Mizoram state in India.

It is part of Lawngtlai district and is reserved for candidates belonging to the Scheduled Tribes. It was established, in 2008, by the Delimitation of Parliamentary and Assembly Constituencies Order, 2008.

== Members of the Legislative Assembly ==
Year	Member	Party
2008	Buddha Dhan Chakma	Indian National Congress
2013	Buddha Dhan Chakma	Indian National Congress
2018	Buddha Dhan Chakma	Bharatiya Janata Party
2023	Rasik Mohan Chakma	Mizo National Front

== Election results ==
=== 2023 ===
2023 Mizoram Legislative Assembly election: Tuichawng
Party	Candidate	Votes	%	±%
MNF	Rasik Mohan Chakma	13,346	44.55	
BJP	Durjya Dhan Chakma	12,695	42.38	
INC	Hara Prasad Chakma	3,232	10.79	
ZPM	Shanti Jiban Chakma	423	1.41	
NOTA	None of the Above	260	0.87	
Majority		651	2.17	
Turnout		29,956	41.0	
MNF gain from BJP		Swing		

=== 2018 ===
2018 Mizoram Legislative Assembly election: Tuichawng
Party	Candidate	Votes	%	±%
BJP	Buddha Dhan Chakma	11,419	43.68	
MNF	Rasik Mohan Chakma	9,825	37.59	
INC	Kali Kumar Tongchangya	4,353	16.65	
NOTA	None of the Above	293	1.12	
Majority		1,594	6.10	
Turnout		26,140	85.14	
Registered electors		30,704		
BJP gain from INC		Swing		

=== 2013 ===
2013 Mizoram Legislative Assembly election: Tuichawng
Party	Candidate	Votes	%	±%
INC	Buddha Dhan Chakma	14,626	69.98	
MNF	Rasik Mohan Chakma	5,900	28.23	
BJP	Victor Talukdar	374	1.79	
NOTA	None of the Above	167		
Majority		8,726	41.8	
Turnout		20,900	79.6	
INC hold		Swing		

=== 2008 ===
2008 Mizoram Legislative Assembly election: Tuichawng
Party	Candidate	Votes	%	±%
INC	Nirupam Chakma	10,421	56.44	
MNF	Rasik Mohan Chakma	7,309	39.59	
BJP	Laxmi Bikash Chakma	435	2.36	
LJP	D. K. Thanga	298	1.61	
Majority		3,112	16.9	
Turnout		18,463	83.6	
INC win (new seat)				

== See also ==
- List of constituencies of the Mizoram Legislative Assembly
- Lawngtlai district
