= Chakma Autonomous District Council =

Autonomous administrative division in India

Coordinates: 22.620°N 92.639°E

Type
- Type: Autonomous District Council

Leadership
- Chairman: Kali Kumar Tongchangya
- Chief Executive Member: Nirupam Chakma, BJP since

Structure
- Seats: 24 Councillors (20 Elected + 4 Nominated)
- Political groups: Government (13): BJP (13); Opposition (7): ZPM (6); MNF (1); Nominated (4): NOM (4)

Elections
- Voting system: 20 plurality voting
- Voting system: 4 nominated
- Last election: May 2023
- Next election: 2028

Meeting place
- Kamalanagar, Mizoram

Website
- www.cadc.gov.in cadc.chakma.in

The Chakma Autonomous District Council (CADC) is an autonomous council under the Republic of India. It is located in the Northeast Indian state of Mizoram, of which it covers about 3.25% area of the state. It governs part of the Lawngtlai district that is sometimes called the Chakma District (Chakma: 𑄌𑄋𑄴𑄟𑄳𑄦 𑄝𑄟𑄴, 'Canghma Bamh' ), a landlocked autonomous district. The Chakma District lies bordered to the north by Lunglei District, to the east by Lai District, and shares international boundaries to the south with Chin State in Myanmar, and to the west with the Chittagong Hill Tracts in Bangladesh. The administrative headquarters of the Chakma district is in Kamalanagar (also known as Chawngte). Covering an area of 686.25 km^{2} (approximately 265 square miles), the Chakma district makes up about 3.25% of the total area of Mizoram. According to the 2011 Census of India, the district is home to a population of 62,094.

Its headquarters is at Kamalanagar. The Chakma people has been demanding to change the status of the Chakma Autonomous District Council into a Union territory under the name Chakmaland.

The CADC was formed under the Sixth schedule of the Constitution of India on 29 April 1972. The council is the replication of the state assembly and exercises executive power over specially allotted departments. It is one of the three Autonomous District Councils of Mizoram state in North-East India. It is an autonomous council for ethnic Chakma people living in South-Western Mizoram bordering Bangladesh and Myanmar. There is also a growing demand to convert the CADC into 'Chakmaland' union territory.

North Eastern autonomous divisions

== Etymology ==
The name Chakma derives from the Chakma people, the primary inhabitants of this autonomous region. The term "Chakma" is believed to have derived from "Tsak" which is associated with Sakhya clan.

== History ==
In 1954 the Central and Assam governments established a regional council, the Pawi Lakher Regional Council (PLRC), for the Lakhers (aka Mara) and the Pawis (aka Lai), in which a large number of Chakmas also resided. However, the PLRC could not function properly right from its inception as there was no common communication language among the three tribal communities to understand each other. The first meeting was held without understanding each other's language. Consequently, in 1958 the Maras boycotted PLRC meetings. In 1972, to resolve the issue the PLRC was divided into three regional councils and upgraded to 3 district councils for Maras, Lais and Chakmas: Mara Autonomous District Council (MADC), Lai Autonomous District Council (LADC) and CADC.

While MADC remained under a single district of Saiha, CADC and LADC were accommodated under the Lawngtlai district with the district headquarters at Lawngtlai. The then Chakma leaders of the Mizo District Council and Pawi-Lakher Regional Council actively engaged themselves with the Government of Assam and the Government at the centre for the creation of an autonomous council for the Chakmas of Mizoram with the inclusion of all Chakma inhabited areas which presently remains outside CADC. Unfortunately only the portion under Pawi-Lakher Regional council got considered. Out of that also many Chakma inhabited villages along the eastern bank of river Tuichawng were not considered under CADC. Thus two-third of the Chakmas of Mizoram had to remain outside the council.

== Geography ==
The surface area of the Chakma Autonomous District Council is 686.25 km^{2}. The headquarters of Chakma Autonomous District Council is Kamalanagar, which means the land of oranges in Chakma language. It is parted into Kamalanagar -1,2,3 & 4. There is only one college in CADC called as Kamalanagar College located at Kamalanagar-2 (Randokpur). Kamalanagar is located on the north-eastern corner of C.A.D.C and on the bank of Tuichawng river. On the east of Kamalanagar town i.e. on the other bank of Toizong (Tuichawng) there stands two Mizo villages known as Chawngte P and Chawngte L. On the eastern bank of Toizong is divided by the rivulet, Chawngte L (Ponsury as called by the Chakmas) the northern bank falling under Lunglei General district and the southern bank Chawngte P, under Lai autonomous District Council.

The Chakma district falls between 21⁰58’ (N) and 22⁰45’ (N) and between 92⁰30’ (E) and 92⁰45’ (E). The tropic of cancer passes over it and its climate is hot and humid. The gentle foothills of the mighty Himalayas adorn its landscape. The two main rivers – Toijong and Thega – weave along the eastern and the western sides respectively forming its natural boundaries. In the north it is bounded by Lunglei District, Myanmar in the South, LADC in the east and Bangladesh in the west.

== Economy ==
Majority of the Chakmas in Mizoram take up farming as their occupation. This occupation is inherited from their ancestors. They mainly grow rice, vegetables and fruits, etc. Rice is considered as the staple food of the Chakmas living in Chakma Autonomous District Council.

== Demographics ==
Religion of Chakma Autonomous District Council in 2011 census
1. Buddhism (92.1%)
2. Christianity (6.03%)
3. Hinduism (1.47%)
4. Others (0.43%)

The total Chakma population of Mizoram is estimated to be more than 100,000 (as per the 2011 census - 96,972). The population of Chakma Autonomous District Council are primarily Chakmas who are a designated Schedule Tribe. The total population of CADC is 45,307 as per 2011 census out of which 70% of it is dependent on agriculture. The population grew from 34,528 in 2001 to 40,265 (as of 2008). The majority of the people of Chakma Autonomous District Council follow Theravada Buddhism. The majority of the people of Chakma Autonomous District Council follow Theravada Buddhism.

== Elections ==
Elections of CADC of 20 constituencies takes place every 5 years.

=== Current Composition ===
The composition of CADC is as follows:

Party		Members		
Party		last election	current	+/−
•	BJP	5	13	▲7
	ZPM	0	7	▲7
	MNF	8	1	▼7
	INC	6	0	▼6
	Independent	0	0	Steady
Total: 20 Members
A dot means: participating in the demissionary CADC government.

== Previous Compositions ==
2018–2023

5	8	7
BJP	MNF	INC

2013–2018

3	17
MNF	INC

== Structure ==
Chakma Autonomous District Council has a total of 24 Members of District Council (MDC), out of which 20 MDCs are elected and 4 MDCs are nominated. The council is led by a Chief Executive Member (CEM) and Executive Members (EMs). The present CEM is Nirupam Chakma.

=== Administrative ===
==== MDC Constituencies ====
There are 20 MDC Constituencies in the Chakma Autonomous District Council. 20 Members of the District Council are elected from these 20 constituencies and 4 MDCs are nominated. The constituencies as on date are

Serial No.	Name of the Constituency	Villages	Created
1	Borapansury – I	Borunasury	1972
1	Borapansury – I	Borapansury - I	1972
1	Borapansury – I	Kurbalobasora	1972
2	Borapansury – II	Barapansury – II	1972
2	Borapansury – II	Silsury	1972
2	Borapansury – II	Tungasora	1972
2	Borapansury – II	Ugalsury	1972
3	Chotopansury	Chotapansury	1972
3	Chotopansury	Gerakuluksora	1972
3	Chotopansury	Gulsingbapsora	1972
3	Chotopansury	Nagdrasora	1972
3	Chotopansury	Sangrasury	1972
4	Bajeisora	Baganpara	1972
4	Bajeisora	Bajeisora	1972
4	Bajeisora	Montola	1972
4	Bajeisora	Ngharum	1972
4	Bajeisora	Old Bajeisora	1972
4	Bajeisora	Ugudasury (N)	1972
5	Kamalanagar (N)	Kamalanagar – I	2013
5	Kamalanagar (N)	Kamalanagar – II	2013
5	Kamalanagar (N)	Ugudasury (N)	2013
6	Kamalanagar (S)	Kamalanagar-III	2013
7	Kamalanagar (W)	Kamalanagar – IV	2013
7	Kamalanagar (W)	Rajmondal – II	2013
7	Kamalanagar (W)	Saizawh (W)	2013
8	Udalthana	Bormon	1972
8	Udalthana	Nolbonya	1972
8	Udalthana	Udalthana – I	1972
8	Udalthana	udalthana – II	1972
9	Ugudasury (S)	Bankawn	1972
9	Ugudasury (S)	Jarulsury	1972
9	Ugudasury (S)	Ugudasury (S)	1972
10	Mandisora	Adubangasora	1972
10	Mandisora	Mondirasora	1972
10	Mandisora	Serlui (Jamersury)	1972
10	Mandisora	Ulusury	1972
11	Ajasora	Ajasora – I	1972
11	Ajasora	Ajasora – II	1972
11	Ajasora	Ajasora – III	1972
11	Ajasora	Borkolok	1972
12	Mainabapsora	Barakabakali	1972
12	Mainabapsora	Bortuli	1972
12	Mainabapsora	Kukurduleya	1972
12	Mainabapsora	Mainabapsora – I	1972
12	Mainabapsora	Mainabapsora – II	1972
12	Mainabapsora	Pelyabapsora	1972
13	Vaseitlang	Charluitlang	1972
13	Vaseitlang	Devasora (N)	1972
13	Vaseitlang	Saminisora	1972
13	Vaseitlang	Vaseitlang – I	1972
13	Vaseitlang	Vaseitlang – II	1972
14	Longpuighat	Betbonya	1972
14	Longpuighat	Golasury	1972
14	Longpuighat	Longpuighat	1972
14	Longpuighat	Semeisury	1972
15	Rengkashya	Futsury	1972
15	Rengkashya	Lokkisury	1972
15	Rengkashya	Rengkashya	1972
16	New Jagnasury	Chotoguisury – I	1972
16	New Jagnasury	Chotoguisury – II	1972
16	New Jagnasury	Damdep – I	1972
16	New Jagnasury	Dursora	1972
16	New Jagnasury	Fulsora	1972
16	New Jagnasury	Pablakhali	1972
16	New Jagnasury	Silbhanga	1972
17	Jaruldobasora	Gersury	1972
17	Jaruldobasora	Jaruldobasora	1972
17	Jaruldobasora	Ludisora	1972
18	Fultuli	Baraiguisury	1972
18	Fultuli	Bilosora	1972
18	Fultuli	Fultuli	1972
18	Fultuli	New Fultuli	1972
18	Fultuli	Samuksora	1972
18	Fultuli	Silosora	1972
19	Devasora (S)	Devasora (S)	1972
19	Devasora (S)	Kamtuli	1972
19	Devasora (S)	Parva – III	1972
20	Parva	Bundukbanga	1972
20	Parva	Gabasury	1972
20	Parva	Parva – I	1972
20	Parva	Parva – II	1972
20	Parva	Siminasora	1972

==== Departments ====
It has a total of 32 No. of departments and they are as follows:

1. Legislative Department
2. Judicial Department
3. Finance Department
4. General Administration Department
5. Agriculture Department
6. Horticulture Department
7. Fishery Department
8. Public Health Engineering Department
9. Industry Department
10. Sericulture Department
11. AH & Vety Department
12. Art & Culture Department
13. Social Welfare Department
14. Soil & Water Conservation Department
15. Local Administrative Department
16. Environment & Forest Department
17. Road Transport Department
18. Sport & Youth Department
19. Co-operative Department
20. Public Works Department
21. Education Department
22. Rural Development Department
23. Water ways Department
24. Information & Public Relation Department
25. District School Education Board
26. Land Revenue & Settlement
27. Planning & Development Department

==== Number of village councils ====
CADC have 83 villages.

1. Adhubangasora
2. Ajasora - I
3. Ajasora - II
4. Ajasora - III
5. Baganpara
6. Borunasury
7. Bajeisora
8. Bandukbanga
9. Betbonia
10. Bilosora
11. Boraguisury
12. Borakabakhali
13. Borapansury - I
14. Borapansury - II
15. Borkolok
16. Boroituli
17. Bottuli
18. Charluitlang
19. Chhotaguisury - I
20. Chhotaguisury - II
21. Chhotapansury
22. Devasora 'N'
23. Devasora 'S'
24. Dursora
25. Fulsora
26. Fultuli
27. Futsury
28. Geraguluksora
29. Gerasury
30. Gobasury
31. Golasury
32. Gulsingbapsora
33. Jamersury
34. Jaruldobasora
35. Jarulsury
36. Kamalanagar - I
37. Kamalanagar - II
38. Kamalanagar - III
39. Kamalanagar - IV
40. Kamtuli
41. Kukurduleya
42. Kurbalavasora
43. Lokhisury
44. Longpuighat
45. Ludisora
46. Mandirasora
47. Maniabapsora - I
48. Maniabapsora - II
49. Montola
50. Nadarasora
51. Nalbania
52. New Chhippui
53. New Jagnasury - I
54. New Jagnasury - II
55. Old Bajeisora
56. Parva - I
57. Parva - II
58. Parva - III
59. Rajmandal
60. Rengashya
61. Silosora
62. Silsury
63. Simeisury
64. Siminesora
65. Udalthanasora - I
66. Udalthanasora - II
67. Ugalsury
68. Ugudasory 'S'
69. UgudasurY 'N'
70. Ulusury
71. Vaseitlang - I
72. Vaseitlang - II
73. W.Saizawh

=== Legislative ===
==== Chief executives ====
The chief executive member exercises all its executive powers in the name of the executive committee of the District Council. The chief executive chairs meetings of the executive committee of the Chakma Autonomous District Council.

List of chief executive members of CADC since 1972
Portrait	Prime Minister Office (Lifespan)	Term of office			Party
Portrait	Prime Minister Office (Lifespan)	Start	End	Duration	Party
Nilo Moni Chakma	Nilo Moni Chakma	23 January 1973	16 December 1973	328 days	Whig
	Atul Chandra Chakma	2 April 1972	22 January 1973	296 days	Whig

S. No.	Portrait	Name	Term start	Term end
1		Atul Chandra Chakma	2 April 1972	22 January 1973
2		Nilo Muni Chakma	23 January 1973	16 December 1973
3		Sneha Kumar Chakma	17 December 1973	1 May 1976
4		Nilo Muni Chakma	15 March 1978	23 January 1983
5		Ramoni Chakma	27 January 1973	20 April 1983
6		Pulin Bayan Chakma	21 April 1983	2 January 1987
7		Nutan Kumar Chakma	3 January 1987	23 January 1988
8		Pulin Bayan Chakma	29 January 1988	23 January 1993
9		Pulin Bayan Chakma	24 January 1993	19 July 1994
10		Adi Kanta Tongchongya	20 July 1994	21 January 1998
11		Pulin Bayan Chakma	22 January 1998	12 December 1999
12		Rasik Mohan Chakma	14 December 1999	18 February 2003
13		Rasik Mohan Chakma	26 February 2003	20 February 2008
14		Kali Kumar Tongchangya	11 March 2008	23 April 2013
15		Dr. Buddha Dhan Chakma	25 April 2013	7 January 2014
16		Buddha Lila Chakma	20 January 2014	25 September 2015
17		Kali Kumar Tongchongya	29 September 2015	3 July 2017
18		Governor's Rule	4 July 2017	2 November 2017
19		Amit Kumar Chakma	3 November 2017	21 March 2018
20		Governor's Rule	22 March 2018	1 May 2018
21		Shanti Jiban Chakma	2 May 2018	15 January 2019
22		Rasik Mohan Chakma	18 January 2019	5 April 2021
23		Durjya Dhan Chakma	5 April 2021	3 October 2021
24		Rasik Mohan Chakma	9 October 2021	2 June 2022
25		Buddha Lila Chakma	3 June 2022	16 November 2022
26		Governor's Rule	17 November 2022	21 May 2023
26		Rasik Mohan Chakma	22 May 2023	23 December 2024
27		Molin Kumar Chakms	23 December 2024	6 July 2025
28		Governor's Rule	7 July 2025	2 July 2026
29		Nirupam Chakma	3 July 2026	Incumbent

==== Politics ====
Of the 20 elected District Council Members- MNF (1), BJP (13).

Of the 516 village council seats in Chakma Autonomous District Council, the Bharatiya Janata Party has 371 seats, Mizo National Front has 115 seats, Indian National Congress has 2 seats and independent candidates have 27 seats. The BJP is in majority in 65 village Councils while the MNF is in majority in 16 village Council.In the remaining 4 Village Council no party has absolute majority.

== See also ==
- Amit Kumar Chakma
- Buddha Dhan Chakma
- Nirupam Chakma
- Nihar Kanti Chakma
- Rasik Mohan Chakma
- Kristo Mohan Chakma
- Lai Autonomous District Council
- Mara Autonomous District Council
- North Eastern Council
- Hill tribes of Northeast India
- Chakma District
