= Nihar Kanti Chakma =

Indian politician

Member of the Mizoram Legislative Assembly
- In office 2018-23
- Constituency: West Tuipui

Personal details
- Born: 5 January 1969 (age 57) Nunsury, Mizoram, India
- Party: Indian National Congress

Nihar Kanti Chakma (born 5 January 1969) is an Indian politician who represented West Tuipui in the Mizoram Legislative Assembly from 1998 till 2023. He is a member of the Indian National Congress. Nihar Kanti Chakma was born to Late Hari Kristo Chakma, a resident of Nunsury village, and a former MLA of the same constituency. Earlier, he held the post of Minister of Veterinary & Rehabilitation department in Mizoram. He made his political debut as a member of the Mizoram Legislative Assembly in 1998 after his father's death. He lost re-election in 2023.
