= Kamalanagar, Mizoram =

Kamalanagar
- Township
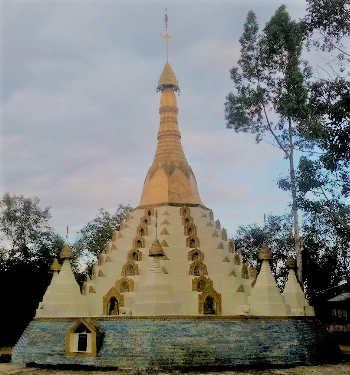
- Kamalanagar Buddhist Temple

- Location within Mizoram Location within India
- Coordinates: 22°37′00″N 92°38′00″E
- Country: India
- State: Mizoram
- District: Lawngtlai

Population (2011)
  - Total: 6,328

Languages
  - Spoken: Chakma
- Time zone: UTC+5:30 (IST)
- PIN: 796772
- Vehicle registration: MZ
- Lok Sabha constituency: Mizoram
- Vidhan Sabha constituency: Tuichawng
- Climate: Cwa
- Website: mizoram.nic.in cadc.gov.in

Kamalanagar is a township in Lawngtlai district in the state of Mizoram in India. It is the administrative headquarters of the Chakma Autonomous District Council. Kamalanagar is one of the fastest growing town in Mizoram.

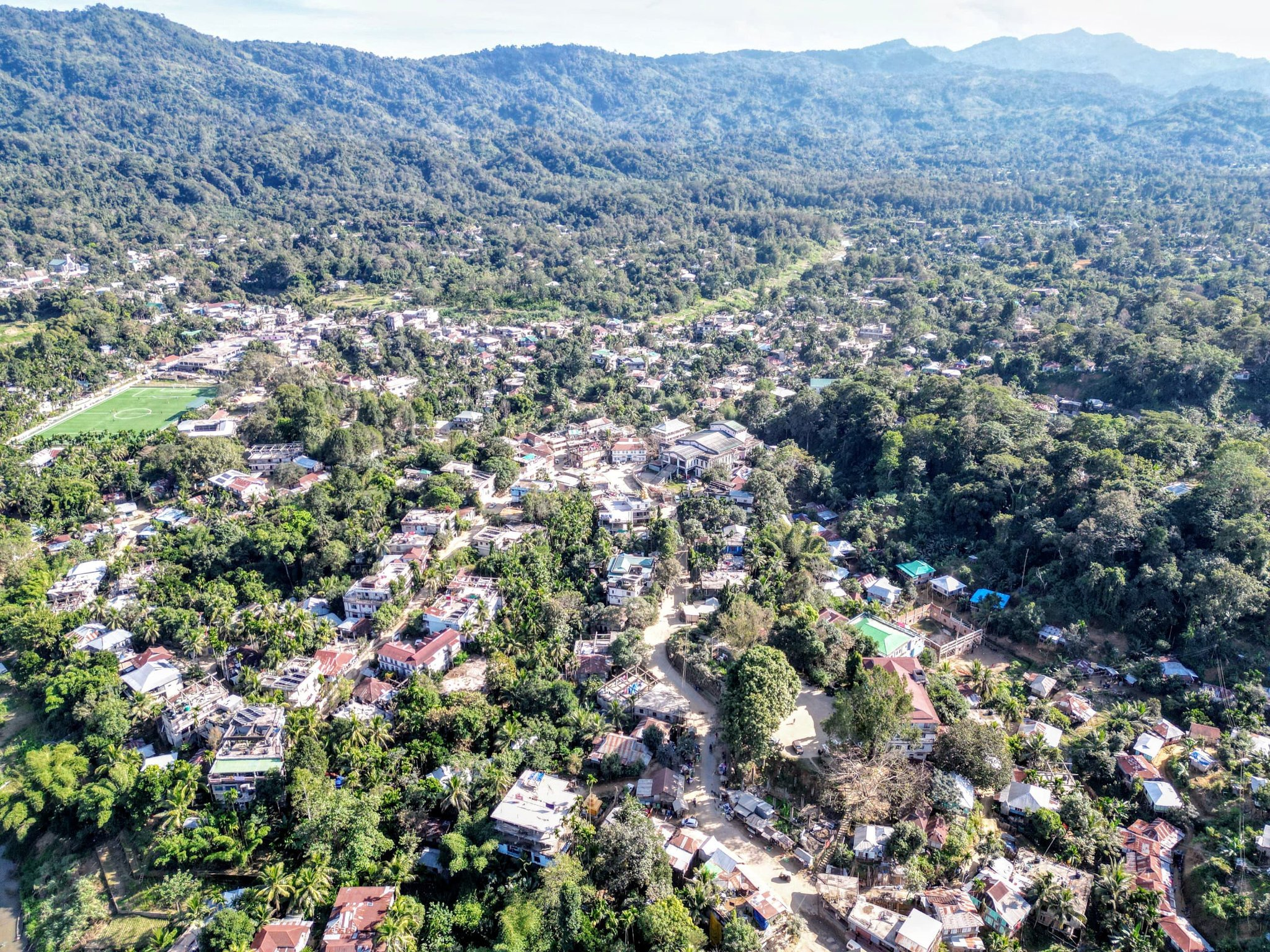
Aerial view of Kamalanagar in 2022

== Demographics ==
As of the 2011 Census of India, the population of Kamalanagar is 6328, with 1184 Households. There are 3251 males (52%) and 3077 females (49%), with 5997 (95%) Scheduled Tribes. The population mostly consists of Chakma people who primarily follow Theravada Buddhism.

== Establishments ==
Government Kamalanagar College is the only college offering undergraduate courses, under Mizoram University and a number of public and private schools.

The State Bank of India and Mizoram Rural Bank are also present.
