= List of people of Chakma descent =

The following is list of notable Chakma people or people of Chakma descent.

== Academics ==
- Amit Chakma (born 25 April 1959) – President & Vice-Chancellor of the University of Western Australia.
- Chandra Kalindi Roy Henriksen – Scholar of indigenous rights.

== Activists ==
- Kalpana Chakma, Bangladeshi human rights activist and feminist

== Art ==
- Kanak Chanpa Chakma (born 6 May 1963), Bangladeshi Chakma artist
- Monjulika Chakma, Bangladeshi weaver
- Smriti Rekha Chakma, Indian weaver and Padma Shri recipient

== Diplomats ==
- Benita Roy (born 18 August 1907), Bangladeshi Chakma aristocrat, diplomat, and minister
- Supradip Chakma (born 1961), Bangladeshi diplomat, ambassador to Vietnam and Mexico.

== Politicians ==
- Amit Kumar Chakma (1984–2023), Indian politician and former CEM of Chakma Autonomous District Council, Mizoram
- Arun Kumar Chakma (born 1954), Indian politician
- Binoy Kumar Dewan (1925–2021), Bangladeshi politician
- Buddha Dhan Chakma (born 27 June 1973), Indian politician and former Minister to Government of Mizoram.
- Charu Bikash Chakma, Bangladeshi politician
- Dipankar Talukdar (born 12 December 1952)
- J.B Larma (born 14 February 1944)
- Kalparanjan Chakma (1922 – 2018)
- Kristo Mohan Chakma (1912 – 1992), Indian Politician and former Member of Mizoram Legislative Assembly
- M.N Larma (1939–1983), Bangladeshi politician and former Member of Parliament, Bangladesh
- Mohan Lal Chakma (1912 – 2013)
- Moni Swapan Dewan (born 18 May 1954)
- Nihar Kanti Chakma (born 5 January 1969), Indian politician and former Minister to Government of Mizoram
- Nirupam Chakma, Indian politician, former Minister to Government of Mizoram and Member of National Commission for Scheduled Tribes
- Parijat Kusum Chakma (1946-1998)
- Prova Chakma (born 1975), Member of Mizoram Legislative Assembly
- Rasik Mohan Chakma (born 1964), Member of Mizoram Legislative Assembly and former CEM of Chakma Autonomous District Council, Mizoram
- Sambhu Lal Chakma (born 20 April 1989), Member of Legislative Assembly, Tripura
- Santana Chakma, Minister to Government of Tripura.
- Upendra Lal Chakma (1925-2005)
- Ushatan Talukder (born 5 August 1950), Bangladeshi politician

== Royalty ==
- Bhuvan Mohan Roy (1876 –1934) – 48th Raja of the Chakmas.
- Bijoy Giri (7th Century CE) – 15th Raja of the Chakmas.
- Devasish Roy (born 9 April 1959) – Raja of the Chakmas.
- Harish Chandra Rai (1841– 1885) – 47th Raja of the Chakmas.
- Kalindi Rani (died 1873) – last independent ruler of the Chakmas.
- Nalinaksha Roy (1902 – 1951) – 49th Raja of the Chakmas.
- Tridev Roy – Raja of the Chakmas.

== Sports people ==
- Barun Bikash Dewan (born 1969), Bangladeshi Chakma footballer
- Champa Chakma (born 1992), Bangladeshi Chakma cricketer
- Juni Chakma, Bangladeshi Kabaddi player and Asian Games bronze medalist
- Monika Chakma (born 15 September 2003), Bangladeshi footballer
- Ritu Porna Chakma (born 30 December 2003), Bangladeshi footballer
- Rupna Chakma (born 2 January 2003), Bangladeshi footballer
- Suro Krishna Chakma (born 12 February 1995), Bangladeshi boxer

== Buddhist clergy ==
- Prajnananda Mahathera (born 1 February 1952) – Buddhist Monk.
- Rajguru Aggavamsa Mahathera (1913 – 2008) – Buddhist Monk.
- Rajguru Priyoratana Mahathera (born 1879) – Buddhist Monk.
