= Raban Expedition =

Punitive Expedition against Rothangpuia (1861)

Date	January 1861 - March 1861
Location	Chittagong Hill Tracts
Result	British Victory; Subjugation of Rothangpuia

Belligerents
(British Raj) British Raj; United Kingdom	Lushai chiefdoms

Commanders and leaders
(British Raj) Captain Raban	Rothangpuia

Units involved
24 Police Battalions	Tribal Militias

The Raban Expedition was a British punitive expedition against Chief Rothangpuia. In 1860, several kuki raids had prompted the British to retaliate. As a result of the expedition, Rothangpuia later allied with the British.

== Background ==
In 1860, the series of raids by the kukis led to the creation of the term known as the Great Kuki raid of 1860. In January 1860, reports had been raised which described the bodies of 400-500 kukis were mobilising at the mouth of the river Fenny. The war party burnt down the villages and killed a few people in the area. The next raid was in Tripura at Chagulneyah by the chief Rothangpuia. The villages were again burnt down and 15 villages were plundered with 185 British subjects killed and another 100 captured.

After the looting of gold, silver and iron, troops and police were sent by the district magistrate but failed to pursue the kukis who had withdrawn back to the jungles. In the Rajmala of Kailas, Chandra Sinha and Guna Gazi armed the settlement in anticipation of a kuki raid which stopped the raiders and caused a retreat to the jungle.

Raban assembled two battalions of the frontier military police as part of the expedition. Kalindi (rani) supplied coolies to carry supplies for the expedition while the Poang tribes refused to do so which led to disappointment from the Lieutenant Governor of Bengal.{{}}

== Raban Expeditiion ==
In July 1860, the newly appointed Superintendent of the Hill Tracts, Captain Magrath, was instructed to organize a punitive expedition of the offending tribes of the raids. Captain Raban was sent in January 1861 to punish Rothangpuia for his raids on British territory. His force assembled the military police of the frontier and led a march against Rothangpuia's village. On Raban's arrival to Rothangpuia's settlement, the Kukis burnt down their village. The British forces under Raban set fire to all the maunds of paddy. Alexander Mackenzie stated that this expedition "A good deal of damage was done to them in various ways, but beyond proving to the savages that their fastness were not inaccessible, it could not be said that much else was effected." The lieutenant Governor in a report stated on the expedition that the cowardice of friendly Kuki allies made it impossible for Captain Raban to continue his march further and deeper into the hill tracts. Raban furthermore accredited the conduct of Jemadar Moosuddy Khan describing it as praiseworthy. Captain Raban's report also mentioned how any extension of the expedition would be inadvisable and impractical in the current season at the time. Captain Raban preferred to strengthen the frontier with outposts and strengthen defenses against raids. The inspector-general of police battalion recommended Captain Raban to remain at Chittagong. Per Raban's suggestions the government undertook a policy of proactively arming the frontier settlements with rifles and guns to protect them from raids.

During Raban's expedition, another raid occurred in the territory of Hill Tipperah in Oodoypore. The small sentry force fled, and the Kukis burnt and destroyed three populous villages and retired east. Upon retiring east, the Kukis further raided several villages under Kalindi (rani), including the police post at Kurkurea, which resisted the raid. Captain Raban later stated to have received little to no assistance from the Tripura king during the expedition.

In September 1861, Rothangpuia who had more than once made overtures of friendship offered submission and cooperation with the British. This was explained as the dread of a possible advance of a larger force in the cold season. Rothangpuia offered his aid to the British in reaching any tribes beyond him.

== Sources ==
=== Articles ===
- Lalruatkima (February 2016). "Frontiers of Imagination: Reading over Thomas Lewin's Shoulders". Studies in History (Sahibahad). 32 (1). Sage Journals. doi:10.1177/0257643015615998.
- Roychowdhury, Nalini Ranjan (April 1976). "Kuki Disturbances in Tipure, 1860-1861". Social Scientist. 4 (9). JSTOR: 60–65. doi:10.2307/3516179.
- Vanlalhruaia, H.; Ramdinsangi (December 2018). "Generating Knowledge on Lushai Hills: The Works of T.H Lewin" (PDF). Mizoram University Journal of Humanities & Social Sciences. 4 (2). Mizoram University. ISSN 2395-7352.

=== Books ===
- Hutchinson, R. H. Sneyd (1906). An Account of the Chittagong Hill Tracts. Calcutta: Bengal Secreteriat Book Depot.
- Lewin, T.H. (1869). The Hill Tracts of Chittagong and the dwellers within (PDF). Calcutta: Bengal Printing Company Limited.
- Mackenzie, Alexander (1884). History Of The Relations Of The Government With The Hill Tribes Of The North-east Frontier Of Bengal. Calcutta: Home Department Press.
- Mackenzie, Alexander (1869). Memorandum on the north-east frontier of Bengal. Calcutta: Bengal Secretariat press.
