= Vandula =

Southern Mizo chief (1825-1889)

- Chief of Denlung; Denlung Lal
- Predecessor: Tlutpawrha
- Successor: Ropuiliani
- Born: Vanpuiliana; 1825; Diarkhai; Bawngthah
- Died: 1889 (aged 63–64); Denlung
- Spouse: Ropuiliani
- Issue: Lalthuama
- House: Sailo
- Father: Tlutpawrha
- Mother: Lalchhingvungi
- Religion: Sakhua

Vandula (1825-1889; English: Vandoolah) born Vanpuiliana was a Mizo chief of the Haulawng subclan of the Sailos. Vandula waged war with the Chin chief Zahuata and resisted the British during his lifetime.

== Early life ==
Vandula was born as Vanpuiliana around 1825 to Chief Tlutpawrha of the Haulong subclan of the Sailos and his wife Lalchhingvungi. He is argued to have been born at Diarkhai or Bawngthah. He was the only son. Due to his reputation for a large belly, he gained the name Vandula. The British termed Vandula's family as the "southern Howlongs" under Tlutpawrha and his uncle's family, Lalrivunga, as the "northern Howlongs".

His mother Lalchhingvungi died when Vandula was an infant, and he was raised by his stepmother Bawngkhawli. Vandula gained four half-brothers, known as Vanhnuaichhana, Seipuia, Lalthangvunga, and Laluauva.

== Chieftainship ==
Vandula married Ropuiliani the daughter of Chief Lalsavunga at Aizawl. Vandula and Ropuiliani had six sons and two daughters. His sons were Savuta, Hrangphunga, Sangliana, Thanhulha, Dotawna and Lalthuama. His dauthers were Lalropuii and Darpuiliani. Following his marriaged, Tlutpawrha granted Vandula his own village was Chhiphir. Vandula moved his followers to Kawmzawl.

Vandula established a village at Aithur. This village was located close to the Pawis (Lai). As a result several Daido villages were placed on hill tops led by prominent pasalṭhas. Vandula however left Aithur as the cultivation was finished quickly and the risk of a Pawi raids was too high. In 1873, Vandula shifted to Hnathial. Vandula's prestige grew without enemies and being surrounded by blood kin chiefs in his vicinity. Vandula appointed Savuta as the ruler of a village, but he died. Hrangphunga was appointed to rule independently. His other sons, Sangliana and Dotawna, were assigned as satellite settlements for Pawi raids.

Vandula soon made a raid on a Lakher (Mara) village known as Laki or Vaki on the Arracan border. The raid secured a brass bowl and a earthenware vase. However the articles were gifted to the Vaki chief from the Thlantang Chief Zahuata as a bridal gift for his daughter's marriage. Vandula refused to return the articles and Zahuata attacked a Lushai piquet and declared war against Vandula.

=== Bungkhaw Run ===
Vandula attacked Bungkhaw for revenge. In 1881, Vandula's men raised a Chin village and burnt it down. The Chins refused to acknowledge the defeat and kept up the fight and killed a notable pasalṭha. When Vandula's men were returning to the Lushai Hills, they were ambushed by a Chin volley. Some of the warriors survived as the rain washed away tracks of blood to trace them. As a result, Vandula was considered defeated. The war lasted as long as twelve years until peace was made in Darzo.

=== Anglo-Lushai relations ===
In 1863, Sir Cecil Beadon instructed the British to induce diplomatic relations with the frontier tribes and to settle with their chiefs for peace. Captain Graham, the Superintendent of the Chittagong Hill Tracts, met with several chiefs to create binding peace agreements. Vandula, who represented the Haulawngs, signed the agreement alongside his brothers. Vandula sent an elephant trunk as a token of friendship with the British.

In 1870 the British attempted to lead an expedition to open communication routes to Cachar. Vandula depite his previous agreement refused access. Following the final days of the Lushai Expedition and the recapture of Mary Winchester (Zoluti), Vandula offered to submit to the British and surrender captives to Rothangpuia's village. Vandula however delayed this offer and Thomas Herbert Lewin thus advocated for military retaliation. Lewin reached Seipuia's village with the 4th Gurkhas and the 27th Punjab Infantry and made an oath of friendship. Vandula, however, failed to meet with the British. Sangliana was sent instead and excused Vandula on account of poor health. The force agreed to Sangliana submitting on Vandula's behalf and carried out all demands of the British.

In 1889 following the Chin-Lushai Expedition, Vandula refused to cooperate with Charles Stewart Murray. In comparison, Seipuia cooperated with the British and ceded land for fortifications. Shakespear described Vandula as the "consistent opponent of the British".

== Later life ==
Vandula died in 1889 at Denlung. His sons had died before him with the exception of Lalthuama. His wife Ropuiliani became a chieftainess who resisted British rule. Lalthuama was jailed with Ropuiliani. While Ropuiliani died, Lalthuama was released.

== Genealogy ==
Rolura Family Tree

Rolûra
Lalrivunga	Tlûtpawrha
Khawsaia	Ṭhuama	Thangduta	Lalpuithanga
Vansânga	Sângvunga	Bengkhuaia
Dokhûma	Kânglova	Liankhâra	Rochungnunga
Thâwngliana	Lalhrima	Kâmlova	Tlungbuta
Vandula	Seipuia	Lalthangvunga	Lalluauva	Vanhnuaichhana

== Sources ==
- Chatterjee, Subhas (1995). Mizo Chiefs and the Chiefdom. New Delhi: M D Publications PVT LTD. ISBN 81-85880-72-7.
- Shakespear, John (1912). The Lushei and Kuki Clans. London: Macmillan and Co., Limited.
- Zorema, J. (2010). "Vandula". Historical Journal Mizoram. XI (1).
