= Mary Winchester =

Mary Winchester may refer to:

- Mary Winchester (Supernatural), a character in the American TV series Supernatural
- Mary Winchester (hostage) (1865–1955), Scottish girl captured and held hostage by the Mizo tribes of Mizoram, India, in 1871
