= Nalinaksha =

Nalinaksha is a given name. Notable people with the name include:

- Nalinaksha Dutt (1894–1973), Indian politician
- Nalinaksha Roy (1902–1951), 49th Raja of the Chakma Circle
- Nalinaksha Sanyal (1898–1987), Indian politician, economist, and freedom fighter
