= Chakma =

Chakma may refer to:

- Chakma people, a Tibeto-Burman people of Bangladesh and Northeast India
- Chakma Circle, chiefdom of Chakma people
- Chakma language, the Indo-Aryan language spoken by them
  - Chakma script
    - Chakma (Unicode block)
- Chakma (surname)
