= Bengkhuaia =

Southern Sailo chief (c.1829-1879)

- Chief of Sailam; Sailam Lal
- Predecessor: Lalpuithanga
- Born: Lalsahulha
- Died: 1879
- Spouse: Ngurthankimi (Zadeng)
- Issue: Thawngliana; Lalhrima; Kamlova; Tlungbuta
- House: Sailo
- Father: Lalpuithanga
- Religion: Sakhua

Bengkhuaia (c. 1829-1879), born Lalsahulha, was a southern Mizo chief of the Sailo clan. His subclan, also known as Howlong, was named after the mountain they historically resided by. He was son of Lalpuithanga who led the North–South War of the Lushai Hills, India, in the 1850s. Bengkhuaia, as chief, would be responsible for the Lushai Expedition.

== Chieftainship ==
After the North–South War of the Lushai Hills, Lalpuithanga would die shortly after at Bawngchawmah near Serchhip. Bengkhuaia along with his siblings would inherit Lapuithanga's prestige in the south Lushai Hills. Bengkhuaia left with his wife and children to Kawlri and ruled as a chief. Bengkhuaia's chieftainship is recorded as a wise and popular leader. Bengkhuaia sent diplomats to the northern Sailo chiefs to repair relations from the war his father led. His village of Sailam grew. As Lallula's sons consolidated their rule many smaller tribes and refugees joined with Bengkhuaia in Sailam. Despite being born Lalsahulha, he earned his name due to his father's alliance with the Pawi. Bengkhuaia is a Pawi name.

Bengkhuaia's cousin Lalhleia (brother of Vansanga) and his wife were soon captured by the Pawi. Lalburha (Thangduta's son) asked Lalzika in Darlong for money however was rejected. Lalburha came to Bengkhuaia for his aid instead. Bengkhuaia offered him help and allocated part of his domain to Lalburha. Lalburha became a subordinate chief to Lalburha along with Diarkhaia and Zathawma, his sister. Bengkhuaia attacked the villages and defeated them. They then occupied the Kawlhawk mountains. As his power and influence in the south grew, Vanhnuailiana's son Lalbura invited him to fight the Sukte chief Zapauva. However he did not get involved. Bengkhuaia was also once targeted by Khalkam. However Khalkam aborted his attack upon seeing the large fortified village of Sailam and took the guns back.

=== Lushai Expedition ===
Bengkhuaia led a raid on the tea garden of Alexnadrapur in January 1871. The raid saw James Winchester killed and his five-year-old daughter Mary Winchester abducted. Mary Winchester was kept in the village of Sailam and treated well. However, the actions led to the British government intervening in the Lushai Hills to curb the raiding and to retrieve Mary Winchester. The expedition set up a Cachar (Left) column and the Chittagong (Right) column. The Cachar column was tasked with punishing Lalbura and Vanhnuailiana. The Chittagong column was tasked with retrieving Mary Winchester.

Mizo recounts of Mary Winchester's captivity describe Bengkhuaia of being fond of Mary who had been renamed Zoluti. Bengkhuaia made her clothes and treated her well by placing her in his own house. During her life in Sailam many of individuals would protect her from the young boys who got too rough. Mary had been under the care of Tluangi an elder woman who worked near the chief's house. Tluangi is known as the wife of Vansuakthanga and grandmother of Pastor Vanchhunga (one of the earliest Mizo pastors). When the expedition revealed the burning villages nearby some men blamed Mary and wished to kill her, however Tluangi protected Mary.

The Chittagong Column departed on 8 October 1871 with Thomas Herbert Lewin and Rothangpuia under General Brownlow. The column forced their way through Demagiri and seven other villages. These were mainly the villages of Savunga and his sons Lalzika, Lalhlira, Vanlula and Lianngura. Rothangpuia was sent to negotiate with Bengkhuaia and the chiefs. Mary Winchester was handed back to the British without any confrontation on 25 January 1872. She had spent a whole year in Sailam by then. Mary had been reluctant to leave Sailam. According to Mizo recounts, Mary was sent against her will after Tluangi tricked her into going with the sepoys. However the southern chiefs had not released the captives from the raids. As a result, Thomas Herbert Lewin was sent once more with two companies of soldiers. During the night the Lushais entered his tent and gave him message to meet the chiefs alone which Lewin obliged. On 16 February Bengkhuaia sent his representatives ahead of him to receive Lewin while he brought a mithun for an oath for Lewin to protect him as he submitted to the British. met with Savunga and Bengkhuaia, who arrived the next day. The chiefs were wary with cooperating with the British due to the story of the Lalchukla and the Blackwood Expedition. However Lewin known as Thangliena, was known for his affinity with the hill people easing their concerns.Bengkhuaia met with Lewin at the river near the old settlement of Thenzawl. The river became known as vai biak lui. Both chiefs gave Lewin their sword but Lewin returned it back immediately. Negotiations went on for an understanding and agreement to the goals of the expedition. All captives were to be set free, the British had free entry to their villages, a friendship to be declared between the Lushais and British and a promise to not raid British territory. Lewin's negotiations appeased both General Brownlow and the chiefs Bengkhuaia and Savunga. Bengkhuaia made a formal representation of elephant tusks as a symbol of submission. An oath was taken with Lewin personally where the mithun was sacrificed with blood of the mithun smeared on his feet and forehead. They ate the raw liver of the mithun and repeated the oath that their friendship would last until the rivers ran back into the earth again. Bengkhuaia and the chiefs gave Lewin a gun, a dao and a headress with tail feathers of the vakul. This was to show that Lewin was accepted as a chief. A petition was made that Lewin should settle on Sirte Tlang near their villages so they could communicate more easily. Bengkhuaia released all his captives that evening.

== Later years ==
Bengkhuaia moved from Sailam to build a new village of Thenzawl. Thenzawl consisted of 700 houses and 5 zawlbuks. In the last years of his life, Bengkhuaia participated in wars against the northern chiefs.

== Death ==
Bengkhuaia died in 1879, around the age of 50. Thenzawl was succeeded by his son Kamlova. His other villages and territory were split across his children.

== Genealogy ==
Rolura Family Tree

Rolûra
Lalrivunga | Tlûtpawrha
Khawsaia | Ṭhuama | Thangduta | Lalpuithanga
Vansânga | Sângvunga | Bengkhuaia
Dokhûma | Kânglova | Liankhâra | Rochungnunga
Thâwngliana | Lalhrima | Kâmlova | Tlungbuta
Vandula | Seipuia | Lalthangvunga | Lalluauva | Vanhnuaichhana

== Sources ==
- Lalthangliana, B. (2005). Culture and Folklore of Mizoram. Aizawl: Publications Division Ministry of Information and Broadcasting. ISBN 978-81-230-2658-9.
- Vanlallawma, C. (1996). Bengkhuaia Sailo. Aizawl: Lengchhawm Press.
- Whitehead, John (1992). Thangliena: The Life of T.H. Lewin (PDF). Gartmore, Stirlingshire: Kiscadale Publications. ISBN 1870838068.

- Lalthlengliana (2007). The Lushai Hills: Annexation, Resistance and Pacification 1886-1898. Delhi: Akansha Publishing House.
