= Seipuia =

Southern Mizo chief

- Chief of Zohmun; Zohmun Lal
- Predecessor: Tlutpawrha
- House: Sailo
- Father: Tlutpawrha
- Mother: Bawngkhawli
- Religion: Sakhua

Seipuia was a Mizo chief in the Southern Lushai Hills. He belonged to the Haulawng clan of the Sailo. Seipuia was a British ally and supported the British in the Chin-Lushai Expedition and made an oath of friendship with Thomas Herbert Lewin.

== Early life ==
Seipuia was born to Chief Tlutpawrha of the Haulawng Sailos. His brothers were Vanhnuaichhana, Lathangvunga and Laluava from his mother and Vandula from Tlutpawrha's first wife.

Seipuia moved with his family and father to Haulawng before settling in their own villages. Tlutpawrha and Seipuia moved south to establish Khawthir. In 1860, Seipuia established a new village called Zopui.

== Chieftainship ==
Following the death of Tlutpawrha, Seipuia moved to Tuihual. During his rule at Tuihual, the mautam famine broke out and the village moved to settle at Ralvawng. Seipuia settled at Ralvawng for a decade before moving to Zohmun (Ramzotlang) with 300 households. With no enemies, Seipuia's rule grew prosperous and self-sufficient. Seipuia's prestige grew with the presence of pasalṭha Chawngbawla. One time, the pasalṭha Zampuimanga was sent to scout Zohmun to attack it. However, Zampuimanga turned back and abandoned the scheme after being charmed by it.

=== Lushai Expedition ===
During his rule at Zohmun, Seipuia encountered the British. General Brownlow's Chittagong Column encamped at Savunga's village in Buarpui while Rothangpuia was sent to negotiate with chiefs to submission. Seipuia had restricted Subadar Mohamad Azim from accompanying Rothangpuia to travel deeper into Lushai territory due to the consequences of any danger occurring to Azim.

Azim informed the British that Seipuia and Vandula were prepared to submit and surrender all captives to Rothangpuia's village of Lungsen. However, both chiefs delayed fulfilling the condition, leading to Thomas Herbert Lewin proposing military retaliation. Lewin reached Seipuia's village with the 4th Gurkhas and the 27th Punjab Infantry after a three-day journey. Seipuia met with Lewin, took an oath of friendship, and handed over all captives. Seipuia further gave an elephant tusk as a gift, while Lewin gave a double-barreled gun with ₹800.

Seipuia was invited by Lewin to visit Calcutta. The Chiefs were hesitant to trust the British after knowing the fate of Chief Lalsuthlaha, whose promise of a fair trial and pardon was betrayed. In November 1873, seven chiefs with a few followers assembled at Demagiri, but Seipuia refused to go with Lewin and the other chiefs. Seipuia asked Lewin if the Governor-General was more powerful than Lewin. Lewin honestly answered that the Governor-General had more power. The chiefs inquired, "What if he ordered Seipuia to be speared?"

=== Migrations ===
In 1876, Seipuia moved from Zohmun to Saza and then to Thuampui. In 1879, he settled at Valcheng when the mautam famine Thing Tam occurred. Seipuia assigned a khawper (sub-village) at Luanman to increase the supply of rice. In 1885, Seipuia shifted the village from Valcheng to Kawmzawl. He gave his old village to Vandula's son Thanzama.

=== Chin-Lushai Expedition ===
In 1888, Robert Lyall proposed dispatching a column from Demagiri, using the villages of Seipuia and Vandula as a base, if both chiefs were trustworthy. When Seipuia warned the British of impending raids on a survey party on the Lushai Hills border, it was ignored. Seipuia assured the cooperation of his brothers and gave information about Zahuata and Hausata who murdered Lieutenant John Fraser Stewart.

On 19 December 1888 the Government of India ordered another expedition in the Lushai Hills. Seipuia helped the British. On 3 April 1889, the British held a durbar of chiefs at Lunglei which Seipuia attended with lalvunga, Sangliana and Lalruma. The chiefs took an oath of loyalty to the British. Seipuia also aided the British in establishing a fort at Lungleh by providing men to work. As a token of friendship, Seipuia ceded hios old village to the British to build military stockades and thus developed Lungleh town.

During the Lushai Rising Seipuia and his brothers did not rise against the British and cooperated in supporting the British.

=== Lushai Hills District ===
Captain John Shakespear was given an elephant tusk by Seipuia and his brothers as a token of friendship when he was departing from the district as superintendent. In 1895, Seipuia moved from Khawthir to Baichi. In 1899, Seipuia shifted his village from Baichi to Zopui. To avoid the Government Coolie labourers, he shifted to Saitluk, where he lost many followers and shrunk to 70 houses.

== Later life ==
Rothangpuia had married Seipuia's sister and was brother-in-law to him. He had two sons, Lalvuta and Liannawla. In 1912, Shakespear published the book The Lushei Kuki Clans and forwarded to Lewin the publication dedicated to him. He noted to Lewin that Seipuia was alive at the time. In 1915, when communicating with James Herbert Lorrain, Lorrain notified Lewin that Seipuia had died a few years back.

== Genealogy ==
Rolura Family Tree

Rolûra
Lalrivunga	Tlûtpawrha
Khawsaia	Ṭhuama	Thangduta	Lalpuithanga
Vansânga	Sângvunga	Bengkhuaia
Dokhûma	Kânglova	Liankhâra	Rochungnunga
Thâwngliana	Lalhrima	Kâmlova	Tlungbuta
Vandula	Seipuia	Lalthangvunga	Lalluauva	Vanhnuaichhana

== Sources ==
- Chatterjee, Subhas (1995). Mizo Chiefs and the Chiefdom. New Delhi: M D Publications PVT LTD. p. 170. ISBN 81-85880-72-7.
- Verghese, C.G.; Thanzawna, R.L. (1997). A History of the Mizos. New Delhi: Vikas Publishing House.
- Whitehead, John (1992). Thangliena: The Life of T.H. Lewin (PDF). Gartmore, Stirlingshire: Kiscadale Publications. ISBN 1870838068.
- Zorema, J. (2009). "Chief Seipuia Sailo". Historical Journal Mizoram. X (1): 38–43.
- Zorema, J. (2010). "Vandula". Historical Journal Mizoram. XI (1).
