= George Bourchier =

George Bourchier may refer to:

- George Bourchier (Elizabethan soldier) (c. 1535–1605), English soldier who fought and settled in Ireland
- George Bouchier or Bourchier (died 1643), wealthy merchant of Bristol who supported the royalist cause during the English Civil War
- George Bourchier (Indian Army officer) (1821–1898), served in the Bengal Army (one of three armies that made up the British Indian Army)
