= Harish Chandra (raja) =

Harish Chandra Rai
- Raja

Chief of the Chakma Circle
- Predecessor: Kalindi Rani
- Successor: Bhuvan Mohan Roy
- Born: c. 1841; Chittagong Hill Tracts, British India
- Died: 1885 (aged 43–44)
- Spouse: Shourindri Dewan
- Issue: Rajkumari; Raja Bhuvan Mohan Roy; Rajkumar Ramani Mohan Roy

Raja Harish Chandra Rai (c. 1841–1885) was the 47th Raja of the Chakma Circle.

== Biography ==
He was the grandson of Raja Dharam Bux Khan through his daughter born of his third Rani.

He married Rani Shourindri Dewan of the Larma Goza (Clan or Sept).

His grandmother, Kalindi Rani, assisted in supplying coolie transport for the Lushai Expedition of 1871–72. In recognition of this service, the government of British India vested Harish Chandra with the title of Rao Bahadur. At her death in 1873, he became chief of the Chakmas, and the title of Raja was conferred on him the next year. According to ethnographer J. P. Mills, Harish Chandra's "drunkenness, incompetency and contumacy" rendered him so ineffective a ruler that it became necessary to depose him in April 1884. He died in 1885.

== Children ==
- Rajkumari
- Raja Bhuvan Mohan Roy
- Rajkumar Ramani Mohan Roy
