= Rani Kalindi =

46th and last independent ruler of the Chakma Circle

Rani Kalindi (died 1873) was the 46th and last independent ruler of the Chakma Circle. She was only female ruler of the Chakma people.

== Early life ==
She was born in the village of Kudukchari near the Rangamati-Khagrachari highway in present-day Chittagong Hill Tracts region of Bangladesh and was the daughter of a former dewan Gujan Chakma of the Kurakutya Goza. She grew up with strong kinship networks as her cousins were consorts to the Kalindi King Raja Dharam Bux Khan.

== Rule ==
Kalindi Rani succeeded Raja Dharam Bux Khan in 1832 who died without a male heir. After the Raja's death, a Phoongye (Buddhist monk) came to Arakan to strengthen the cause of Buddhism and convert Kalindi Rani from Hinduism. As a result the Rani converted to Buddhism. The Sangharaja Nikeya believed the Chittagong Buddhists were failing to uphold the principles of Buddhism by worshipping the wrong deities and were in need of reform and purification. When the Sangharaja Nikaya reformers gained the support of Kalindi Rani and began annual fairs honoring Shakyamuni Buddha and replicas of the famed Mahamuni image and built the area's first Pali-language "model schools". To remove corruption from the Sangha and practiced faith of the Chakmas, Kalindi Rani invited Sangharaja Daramitta Mahasthavira of Arakan to come to her kingdom. Mahasthhavira headed the reform movement in 1864. She also supported the publication of the first book on Buddhism in the Bengali language known as Bauddharanjika translated from Burmese. Mahasthavira revised the Chakma Buddhist liturgy in terms of animistic and tantric practice into Theravada Buddhism. As the senior most consort Kalinid Rani became regent to her minor step-grandson allowing her to rule the largest territory of the Hill tracts against the Mong and Bohmong. Kalindi Rani litigated via Bengali lawyers against the other wives of her late husband. Kalindi Rani would also fight a twelve-year court case to claim the properties of her husband which would be granted in 1844. Her legal claim was that she was Hindu widow and thus had the right to solely manage the estates keft by him. The estates of Dharam Bux Khan were under the Court of Wards, Chittagong, before going under the Sarbarakarship of Sukhdev Diwan, a relative of Kalindi and Dharam Bux Khan's widow. In 1855, Kalindi Rani was declared sole representative and the settlement Jum Bangu Utterkul was renewed with an annual rent. As a result the Kalindi Rani fought for recognition of a propriety right in soil and for a permanent settlement. However it was ruled that the government was the sole proprietor and the right was to permanent settlement would not be recognised.

Kalindi Rani monopolized jhum tax collection and charged collateral male heirs for rebellion and riot. She further coerced members of the clan to accumulate power by restructuring the role of dewan as being a class of families as opposed to a prime minister. Using her family's influence in the royal house Kalindi assumed the de facto sovereign powers of the Chakma durbar.

She sided with the East India Company during the Indian mutiny. She delivered troops that mutinied while stationed in Chittagong in 1857. Following the annexation of the Chittagong Hill Tracts in 1860, Kalindi Rani resisted colonial integration. Captain Thomas Herbert Lewin was assigned to control the hill tracts and bring them into the influence of the British crown. Despite this, Kalindi Rani did not acquiesce to cooperate with Lewin. She consistently attempted to discredit Lewin's career by petitioning his superiors in Calcutta and employing Bengali lawyers and advisors. She strengthened the Durbar of chiefs over the aristocracy (dewans) and created ties with Bengal. Kalindi was also alleged to have attempted an assassination on Lewin. To prevent Kalindi from taking taxes from Chakma subjects under the territory of the Mong Raja, Lewin proposed creating revenue divisions of territories where the chiefs could extract taxation rights.

She supported the British Raj in its war against Lushais people during Lushai Expedition. Lewin requested Kalindi Rani and her grandson aid in the expedition. However the 500 Chakma volunteers withdrew their cooperation. The government appealed to Kalindi Rani despite her feud with Lewin. Her grandson Harish Chandra interceded and persuaded the Chakma volunteers to assist Lewin. Following this Lewin realized Harish Chandra's cooperation and requested him to depose Kalindi Rani but he refused to do so.

To reduce the power and influence of the Kalindi Rani, Lewin created two circles for the Chakma territory: the northern Chakma territory and the Bomang circle of the South. The British justified the policy by arguing that Kalindi Rani lived too far away from her districts for effective control. At the time, the Chakma seat was at Rajnagar in Rangunia and Kalindi rules via her dewans with no issues. The British falsely accused her of ineffective control of the northern territories and bifurcated her kingdom without consultation. The Chakma dewans and petty settlements were handed to Keoja Sein, a subject of Kalindi Rani. Kalinid attempted to challenge the decision to higher authorities but received no aid. This policy weakened Kalindi Rani and distributed significant power to Keoja Sein, whom the British preferred for his assistance in the Raban Expedition against Rothangpuia, which Kalindi did not aid.

== Death ==
She died in 1873, leaving her step-grandson Harish Chandra to be the next Chakma Raja in her place.

== Sources ==
- Jhala, Angma Dey (2019). An Endangered History: Indigeneity, Religion and Politics on the Borders of India, Bruma and Bangladesh. New Delhi: Oxford University Press. ISBN 978-0-19-909691-6.
- Jhala, Agnma Dey (2015). Courtly Indian Women in Late Imperial India. Routeledge. ISBN 978-1-317-31443-1.
- Chowdhury, Elora Halim (2015). "Women, Islam, Transnationalism: 'Politics of Location' and other Contentions in Women's Organizing in Bangladesh". In Saikia, Yasmin; Haines, Chad (eds.). Women and Peace in the Islamic World: Gender, Agency and Influence. London: I.B. Tauris. ISBN 978-0-85773-725-0.
- Hutchinson, R. H. Sneyd (1906). An Account of the Chittagong Hill Tracts. Calcutta: Bengal Secretariat Book Depot.
- Risley, Herbert (1909). "Social Movement among lower castes". The Dawn and Dawn Society's Magazine. No. 12.
- Saigal, Omesh (1978). Tripura. Delhi: Concept Publishing Company.
- Ober, Douglas (2023). Dust on the throne: the search for Buddhism in modern India. Stanford, California: Stanford University Press. ISBN 9781503635777.
- Alam, S.M Shamsul (2016). Governmentality and Counter-Hegemony in Bangladesh. Springer. ISBN 978-1-137-52603-8.
- Chakma, Paritosh (2021). Chakma Mizo Relation during British Rule. Mizoram: Chakma Autonomous Council.
