= Bhuvan Mohan Roy =

- Raja
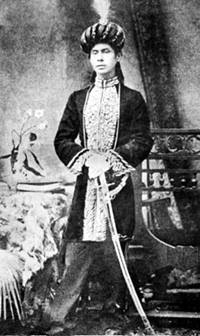

Chief of Chakma Circle
- Reign: 7 May 1897 - 16 July 1933
- Predecessor: Raja Harish Chandra Rai
- Successor: Nalinaksha Roy
- Born: 1876; Chittagong Hill Tracts, British India
- Died: 1934 (aged 57–58)
- Spouse: Dayamoyi Roy
- Issue: Nalinaksha Roy
- Father: Raja Harish Chandra Rai Bahadur

Raja Bhuvan Mohan Roy (1876–1934) was the Chief of the Chakma Circle in the Chittagong Hill Tracts from 1897 until 1933.

== Biography ==
He was born in 1876 to Raja Harish Chandra Rai Bahadur, Chief of the Chakma Circle. After the death of his father in 1885, the Court of Wards assumed the administration of the estate and the Chakma Circle, Bhuvan Mohan being a minor.

Bhuvan Mohan Roy was installed as Chief of the Chakma Circle on 7 May 1897, in recognition of which he received the personal title of Raja. In 1898, he established a Buddhist monastery, Sonaichari Rajvihar, at Sonaichari in what is now Rangunia Upazila. Dashabal Raj Bouddha Vihar was also established under his patronage. He attended the Delhi Durbar of December 1911.

James Philip Mills, an Indian Civil Service officer tasked in 1926–1927 with investigating how the Bengal Government could best use the Chittagong Hill Tracts Chiefs in the administration, wrote of him:

Raja Bhuban Mohan Ray is in character both obstinate and weak ... He is unpopular with his own tribe, as Chakmas of position have told me in private conversation. His people say that he takes no interest in them, and they only regard him as a troublesome individual who takes their money ... He was always eager to talk about dignities and the smallness of his income as compared with what he deserved, but never about duties. He regards the Chakmas merely as a mine to be worked for his benefit; and his vanity is beyond belief. I can find no record that he ever on any occasion aided Government with any valuable advice ... His love of Bengali culture has antagonised the respectable and conservative elements in the tribe. He lives in Bengali style, entirely surrounded by Bengalis ... and he has married his two eldest sons to Bengali ladies, a thing unprecedented in the tribe.

His son, Nalinaksha Roy, took over his duties from 16 July 1933. Bhuvan Mohan Roy died in 1934.
