= Thomas Herbert Lewin =

British military officer and administrator (1839-1916)

Major Thomas Herbert Lewin Thangliena B.S.C
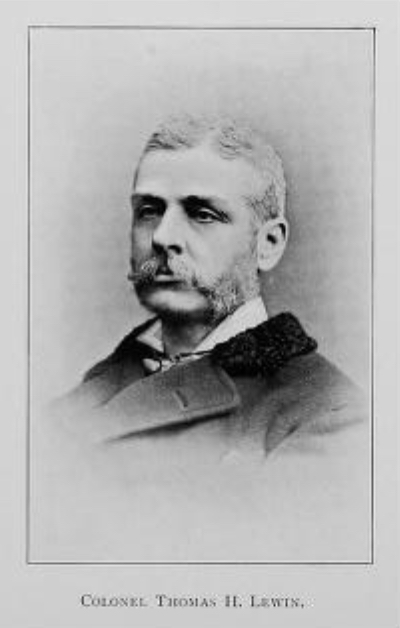
- Colonel Thomas H. Lewin c. 1890
- Born: April 1, 1839; Lewisham, London
- Died: February 11, 1916 (aged 76); Dorking, Surrey, England
- Burial place: Abinger, Moley Valley District, Surrey
- Alma mater: Addiscombe Military College
- Spouse: Margaret McClean (m. 1876)
- Children: Everest Harriet Grote Macdonald (b. Lewin); Charles McClean Lewin; Audrey Hale Waterhouse (b. Lewin)
- Relatives: George Lewin (Father); Mary Lewin (b. Friend, Mother)
- Military career
- Allegiance: United Kingdom
- Rank: Major
- Nickname: Lushai: Thangliana
- Known for: Superintendent of Chittagong Hill Tracts
- Conflicts: Indian Mutiny; Lushai Expedition
- Memorials: T.H Lewin Memorial, Mizoram
- Other work: The Hill Tracts of Chittagong and the Dwellers therein (Calcutta, 1869); The Wild Races of South-Eastern India (England, 1870); Hill Proverbs of the Inhabitants of the Chittagong Hill Tracts (Calcutta, 1873); A handbook on the Lushai Dialect (1874); A manual of Tibetan (1879); A fly on the wheel (1884)

Thomas Herbert Lewin (Lushai: Thangliana, lit. 'Greatly Famous', Chakma: Lubin Saab, 1 April 1839 – 11 February 1916) was a British military officer, linguist and ethnologist. He is most well known for his role as the superintendent of the Chittagong Hill Tracts. Lewin studied and published on the tribes of the northeast frontier on the Chakma, Kuki and Lushais. For this reason he gained the exonym of Thangliana from the Lushai tribes.

== Early life and education ==
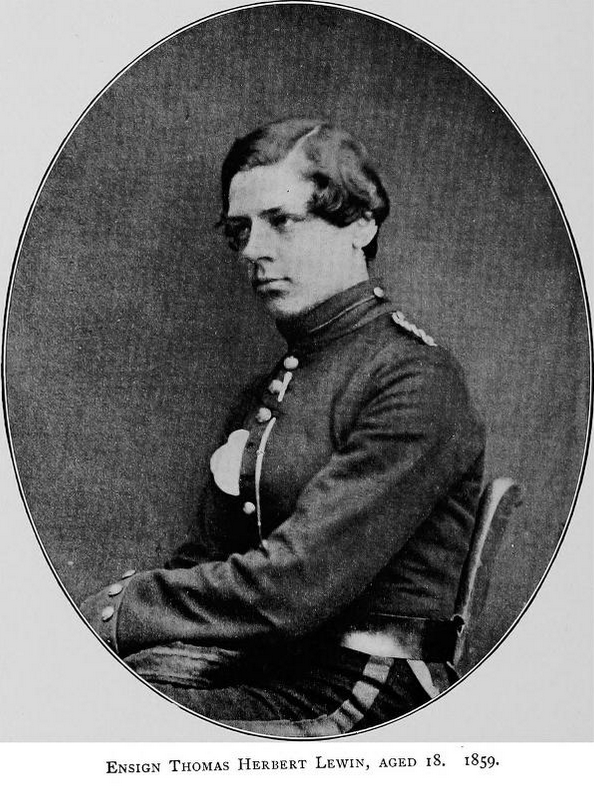
Ensign Thomas H. Lewin in 1859

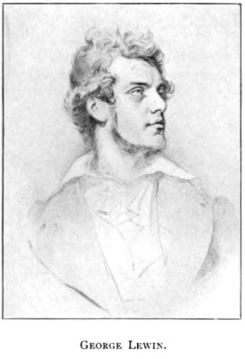
George Herbert Lewin

Thomas Herbert Lewin was born 1 April 1839 in Lewisham, London. He was the son of George Lewin and Mary Lewin (b. Friend). George Lewin was a law clerk under an attorney. His mother Mary was descended from a wealthy family of manufacturers. Thomas Herbert Lewin was christined with his uncles and maternal aunt as sponsors. Lewin was born to five siblings in his family consisting of three sisters (Mary-Jane, Harriet, Isabella) and two brothers (Robert Friend "Bob", William Charles James). Mary Jane would die in 1849 and George Lewin would become bedridden with disease in 1852 that would last five years.

Thomas Herbert Lewin was sent to a boarding academy for boys at Surrey House in Littlehampton on the Sussex coast. Four years later in 1854, Lewin would be moved to Mr Hopkirk's academy at Eltham in Kent which prepared boys for a military career. Lewin was described as rebellious and was reputed to be flogged repeatedly for his actions and conduct at the academy. During that time, Lewin also developed talents for music, art and reading. He excelled in English composition and reading aloud but struggled in Artithmetic while passing all his other subjects. This led to him passing the entrance examination to Addiscombe Military College, the East India Company's military seminary near Croydon in Surrey. He was the nephew of George Grote and Harriet Grote.

He became a cadet at Addiscombe Military College. Through his godfather Thomas, Thomas Lewin was nominated for a cadetship by Sir James Hogg, 1st Baronet, who was a director of the East India Company. Lewin continued his unruly conduct and rebellious reputation at Addiscombe where he was routinely punished with extra drills. His most frequent offence was talking in the ranks. Another incident was for not putting out his candle after lights out in the barrack and being punished with four drills. Lewin was also once granted a punishment of fifteen drills for "gross irreverence and disrepect" of loud applause at the end of a theological lecture which he claimed was sincere.

Lewin originally wished to join the artillery regiment, but his poor grades in mathematics barred him from pursuing it. Lewin would return home between terms at the college and study for the exams under a crammer. Despite his talent as a draughtsman, Lewin continued to find heights and distances difficult. Lewin's father, George Lewin, would die in March 1856 from pneumonia at the age of 47. Despite this, Lewin passed his examinations in Addiscombe and became an ensign of the East India Company. Lewin would then embark on a ship to Bengal after news of disturbances broke out there leaving his mother and brothers behind in England.

== Career ==
=== Indian mutiny ===
In September 1857, Lewin travelled to India as a lieutenant and participated in multiple campaigns to put down the Indian Mutiny. When lewin's shipped called at Malta, the news of the Indian mutiny came to light. The entire Bengal army was in open mutiny and in revolt to company rule. During the voyage, Lewin heard the news of the last batch of Addiscombe cadets being massacred at Allahabad as they had sat at the mess, which stirred the situation. Lewin would write on his thoughts with these revelations:

The fun of our voyage was gone. The glories and wonders of Alexandria and Cairo; the crossing of the pathless desert sands, strewn with skeletons of animals and shapeless masses of rok, over which we jolted heavily in our mule drawn vans, the dry burning heat of the Red Sea and the moist clinging warmth of the Indian Ocean and Ceylon; the strange new human creatures that swarmed round the ship, importunate for alms, as we stopped for coating; all passed before our eyes like a dream, as obstacles and delays in our now tedious journey. The fever had seized us; the desire to fight, the wish for vengeance was in our blood. We wanted one thing only - to reach quickly the land where our comrades and friends had so treacherously been murdered.

— The Lewin papers, Thangliena: Life of T.H. Lewin, Whitehead

Lewin's ship sailed up the Hooghly and docked in October. Lewin reported to the fort adjutant and settled into the Cadet headquarters of Fort William. His uncle by marriage, Arthur Grote was a civilian in the company's service also offered Lewin to stay with him at their residence in Alipore. Lewin would learn from Grote his cousin Edward was serving in the artillery in Lucknow. Lewin was attached to the 34th Border Regiment under orders for Cawnpore, which he joined at Chinsura in the west. Lewin would encamp on the bare ground for the night before parading and embarking by railroad. The journey would continue via horseback to Allahabad via the Grand Trunk Road under a subaltern named Cochrane. The country was under martial law. Lewin would observe corpses hanging from makeshift gibbets along the way, and Cochrane ordered him and his men to keep their rifles loaded. At Benares, the men joined a detachment of the 82nd Regiment under Captain Marriot and proceeded via a different mode of transport.

Lewin would keep night watch with Cochrane. He described the uneasiness of being among the 'scowling natives' of the Allahabad bazaar to fetch new trousers. He would procure a personal staff consisting of a kitmutgar (table servant) and a syce to look after a grey pony he had recently brought. Lewin's rebellious attitude continued as an incident recounts how he took the reins of the bullocks of an Indian driver and tried to steer the wagon only to crash in a ditch with him trapped under the Bullock's hooves.

Lewin's regiment the 34th, along with the 82nd, 88th and 20th rifle brigades were sent to reinforce the Cawnpore town's ferry and boats over the Ganges river. The regiments were ordered to keep the road bridge open and to fight off the state army of Gwalior under Nana Sahib and Tatya Tope. Lewin was told by a sergeant that lying heaped at the bottom were the bodies of women and children who Nana Sahib had slaughtered. The courtyard was still strewn with blood and torn clothes. Lewin would explore the huts and discover a bible and a wall scratched with the words "Oh Lord, Our God, save us in this our time of trouble".

After relieving and reinforcing Lucknow, Lewin arrived at Cawnpore General Campbell, escorting 2000 women, children and the vulnerable to a place of safety. The General proceeded to escort them by boat down the Ganges River to Allahabad. After Tantya Tope sealed off the town from the west and east with the capture of Bani Bridge to Lucknow, the British forces, while outnumbered, decided to strike first. This would be Lewin's first direct experience of warfare. Lewin would record his experience:

Bang! a mighty round shot whizzed over the column. I was on the right wing. Bang! again, and this time they got the range and the grape-shot tore through our column. The word was given, 'Extend into skirmishing order to the left. Double'. Away we went, the cannon banging right at us, and shells bursting over our heads.

You can form no idea how terrible is the sound of round shot: it seems like Death personified. We were now running through a little copse, advancing under whatever cover we could find towards the enemy's guns, until at last we came to an open place and I saw stretched before me a large plain broken by shrubs and rocks, every nook and corner of which was filled with red-coated sepoys firing at us, and I was lost in astonishment that I was not hit; but we rushed on straight at them, and just then a fellow tumbled down close to me; I thought he had tripped and stopped to help him, but found he was doubled up in a heap with his face a pool of red blood.

The first blood I had ever seen. Then I began to feel angry, and I waved my sword in the air calling out, 'Come along, my boys. Remember Cawnpore!' but with a somewhat feeble voice, trying to fancy myself brave; and not succeeding very well in the attempt. At last we came to a stop under the shelter of a house and were here in comparative safety, for which I was heartily thankful, as I was terribly blown.

— The Lewin Papers, Thangliena: The life of T.H. Lewin, Whitehead

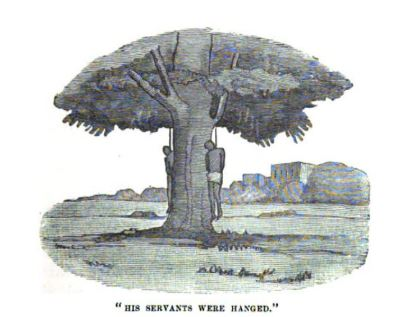
Servants hanged during the Indian mutiny

The advance continued and Lewin skirmished towards a village and overran a few snipers with bayonets. Soon afterwards the order came to retire on Cawnpore. The next day heavy guns began to approach entrenchments. As a result, Lewin was ordered to take up position astride the road while round shot and musket balls whistled over them. Two rebel cavalry charges were fought off before the force retired to the entrenchments. The next day, Lewin's company was soon to guard a bridge across a small ravine. The regiment hastily improvised barricades out of wagons, carts, bricks and other materials which lead to casualties as the rebels fired upon them including General Carthew who Lewin offered a drink from his flask. The same night Sir Colin Campbell escorted the non combatants onto boats and saved the situation. On 6–7 December Tantya Tope was defeated as the 34th withdrew behind entrenchments to recover while new arrivals reinforced. The 34th took up quarters in the Masonic Hall in Cawnpore town and celebrated Christmas. Before they left Cawnpore, Lewin went to attend a parade in the courtyard of Bibi ghar to witness four of the rebels being hanged.

In January, Lewin and the 34th were sent to the Madras Artillery detachment at Bani Bridge between Cawnpore and Lucknow to furnish guards for convoys, take supplies to the Alambagh and maintain communications with the south. Lewin, while encamped at Bani Bridge, would hear the news of the death of his cousin Edward, who was killed via a round shot at Lucknow. Lewin was then marched with the 34th, attacking villages and destroying forts while carrying the regimental colours. Lewin at the end of the 23 miles cast it on the ground and stated "Damn the colours! Why don't you carry them yourselves!" which got him reported to the Colonel and rebuked. However, Lewin managed to make the carrying of the regiment colours shared among the soldiers. Reaching Lucknow the 34th was considered to be reduced in strength and strenuously campaigned, which led to them and Lewin being assigned subsidiary tasks in the recapture of the city. During this, Lewin called his pony and galloped into the fray, reaching the school buildings where the Punjab Rifles were fighting alongside the Highlanders. He observed the planning, mapping, gum emplacements, and entrenchments which he described in a letter to his mother on 20 March after the fighting was over.

==== List of offences of Ensign T.H. Lewin from October 19, 1857 to April 20, 1858 ====
- October 1857, Walking into Major Kavanagh's office at Fort Calcutta and mistaking him for a clerk. He was taken down a peg as a result.
- November 1857, Cutting off a turkey's head with hungry intent on the line of march between Cawnpore and Benares. He was fined for the Turkey.
- February 1858, Forcibly ejecting another cadet from the tent while encamped at Bani Bridge. He was reprimanded.
- February 1858, Damming the Queen's colours at Meergunge. He was placed under arrest and severely reprimanded.

=== Superintendent of Hazaribagh ===
Lewin returned to England in January 1860 for one year to celebrate his 21st birthday. He would return in February 1861 to Calcutta and stay with his uncle Arthur Grote at Alipore. Lewin began to search for a career that would, in a short amount of time, permit him to return home to England to his family. On the voyage back and forth to India, Lewin met with Captain Pughe and his wife, who were friends of Arthur Grote. Pughe had been appointed inspector general of the new military police and, with Grote's influence, offered Lewin the post of adjutant and second-in-command of the 2nd battalion being raised at Rampur in West Bengal. The battalion was raised to supplement the reorganized Indian army and function as a police auxiliary force to keep the peace. Rampur, which was a European civil station consisting of merchants and indigo planters, had experienced the restlessness of the planters, which called for a military police battalion.

Lewin was temporarily in command as the commandant was on leave when he arrived. Lewin presided over 600 men in the battalion of Hindu, Muslim and Sikh origins. Lewin also took the opportunity to join the Bengal Staff Corps as an opportunity to serve outside India, which he received on the merit of his language qualifications. He was assigned as a lieutenant in the 104th Regiment. Lewin worked under the police at Pabna for a few weeks until the military police battalion was disbanded. Lewin was made to choose between regimental life with the 104th or the civil police force. As a result, on 17 April 1962, Lewin was gazetted District Superintendent of Police, 3rd class, at Bhagalpur in northern Bihar with a ₹500 monthly salary and ₹100 allowance for travel expenses. After being called upon to shoot a rogue alligator which had eaten a child, Lewin was assigned to Muzaffarpur on temporary duty to organize the new civil police system there before the commandant arrived. The new system saw the head of police not as the district magistrate anymore but with superintendents. Lewin spent two months at Muzaffarpur before being given a permanent appointment with the local rank of Captain as district superintendent at Hazaribagh. Lewin in his spare time wrote for the instruction of his constables a little book on the duties of a policeman called The Constable's Manual which he translated into Hindi, Bengali and Urdu with his clerks. The booklet was officially approved and printed in Calcutta for general distribution and, thus, the first of Lewin's books to be published.

Lewin would continue writing poetry and printing it through his mother under the pseudonym, Newall Herbert, in England to earn a few guineas. Lewin also sketched and wrote stories of sports in India. Lewin wrote an unfinished novel named Bell's Life that began and focused on Indian life but was never completed. In this period, Lewin also was known to play the harmonium he brought from Calcutta. He would study music seriously and request books on composition, as well as thorough bass and musical theory from home. Lewin composed a few pieces and completed marches for By the Firelight and The Message which would be played by the regimental band when the regiment in Hazaribagh would host a ball.

Lewin would subsequently, as superintendent, take a tour with the deputy commissioner to the Santhals, a wild aboriginal race whose language and religion differed from the Indians. Lewin found the experience fascinating. On his return from the tour, Lewin was retained by the colonel of the 104th regiment due to a shortage of officers. Unwilling to do so Lewin placed an application for a transfer to the Bengal Staff Corps and notified the Colonel. Meanwhile, Lewin's jurisdiction began to experience dacoitry and thugs. The Grand Trunk Road was swarmed with dacoits who were preying on travellers by plundering and murdering them. Lewin dressed up as a native and, with ten men, pursued the bandits for six weeks in the rainy season by sleeping rough and eating rice and chapati. Lewin managed to track down the bandits and arrested 16 before the rest escaped. Later, reports from witnesses in villages revealed the identity and location of the ringleader. Lewin planned a night operation where the police force approached the dripping well at Makha (a spring which came out of a cave on a rocky hillside). The police force rushed the bandits, and a skirmish emerged. The leader was shot dead,d and three of the bandits were captured. This initiative earned Lewin deputy inspector-general of police by the government of Bengal.

Lewin entered controversy after the administration changed around him. The deputy-commissioner went on leave with a successor who didn't cooperate along with a new assistant magistrate with a distrust for the police. An ugly incident involving the death of an inmate who was suspected of robbery. Close supervision of Lewin's assistant, Mr. Ellis, would have prevented the incident. As a result, Lewin deferred making an official report to the divisional deputy inspector of police in the hopes that the incident would be forgotten. The acting deputy commissioner made a report to a higher authority and judged Lewin unfavourably for handling his position and Ellis. As a result, Ellis was dismissed while the secretary of Bengal characterized Lewin's part in the incident as evasive and untrustworthy to be fit to lead a district. The new assistant magistrate similarly made a complaint of him. Lewin did not attend a case on the conduct of his constables in which the assistant magistrate attempted an arrest. Lewin's appeal to the acting deputy-commissioner prevented the arrest but decided to place the assistant magistrate on indefinite leave and Lewin to a new post in remote Eastern Bengal known as Noahkhali.

=== Superintendent of Noakhali ===
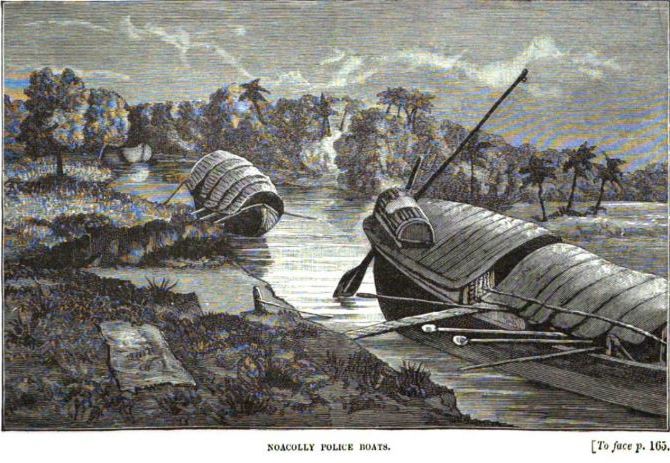
Noakhali police boats

Thomas Herbert Lewin made the choice to take the transfer to Noakhali out of the options he had. Lewin had considered returning to the regiment, moving into the Bengal Staff Corps, becoming a tea planter with a tea estate in Assa, or emigrate to America or New Zealand. Lewin would take his mare, two dogs and two personal servants to Chittagong. Lewin arrived in the Bengali majority district and discovered settlements of Hindus, Afghans and Pathans who arrived centuries before, along with Roman Catholics with Portuguese surnames who formed the Feringhis or half-castes. Lewin also met the Maghs, a misleading name for anyone of Mongolian descent or some admixture. It was mostly referred to the Bengali and Arakan populations of mixed descent. Another demographic was the Rakhaing Maghs, who had been pushed out of Arakan by the Burmese and settled around Cox's bazaar. The Rakhaing Maghs maintained the Burmese language and customs and were Buddhists.

Lewin was allotted a small bungalow overlooking a cemetery and a reservoir rumoured to be haunted. The other European residents considered a civil surgeon and his wife, along with a district magistrate who disliked Lewin. Lewin also became sick with malaria before facing a cholera outbreak. The outbreak saw one of his constables die in his arms. Lewin would also lose one of his dogs to rabies after a rabid dog attempted to attack him. Lewin had to restructure the police in Noakhali and began to learn Bengali. Lewin would use boatmen along the network of streams to reach villages for his duties with his dog Grabby. Lewin was soon also made a trade revenue officer to combat the rise in smuggling, which was common in such a waterlogged province. Lewin also encountered the hazard of false accusations as a police officer. Lewin chased dacoits who had robbed a moneylender but reached the scene of the crime where the victim had hanged themself after the devastating loss. An anonymous petition was filed in the magistrate's court accusing Lewin of murdering the moneylender. Another incident during the battling of smugglers who were moving salt, saw a small child trampled to death. A funeral processions of mourners demanding vengeance for the police's conduct arrived to them demanding compensation. Investigations, however, showed the child had been killed accidentally or possibly as a pretext for making a complaint. The matter was left unsolved.

Lewin completed another manual named the Police Officer's Manual, which was written in Bengali. it contained a brief resume of laws for his constables to be familiar with. It was published at government expense for general circulation and earned Lewin a small royalty. Lewin would continue to write stories and topical articles which were printed Calcutta journals to bring in money. Among them was a weekly sketch in The Englishman under the title Chhota Haziree (small breakfast) which was published as a book by the Calcutta Press Company in 1866. Lewin would apply to the lieutenant-governor of Bengal for appointment to the vacant post of Superintendent of Hill Tracts in the Chittagong Division who would guard the eastern frontier of Bengal. The application was written by police Captain Graham, a former superintendent of the Hill tracts, and was backed by the deputy commissioner of Chittagong and his uncle Arthur Grote. The pay as superintendent was placed at £75 compared to £45 if he became police captain. Lewin also despised Noakhali and the district magistrate. The idea of independent command was also attractive as Lewin states in a letter to his mother: "up in the hill I shall be Magistrate & Superintendent & King & everything. Ah my own!" Graham who was impressed by Lewin's work as superintendent of police recommended a transfer to the Chittagong district.

=== Superintendent of Chittagong police ===
Lewin preferred Chittagong to Noakhali and expressed this in the letters to his mother. In the Bay of Bengal, Chittagong was known as Lady's Eyebrows for the frequent cyclone activity. Other phenomena such as floods and devastation of crops and food were also known. The wealthy lived in bungalows overlooking the town beneath. Lewin originally lived with the local clergyman Mr Humfrey in a bungalow named The Deanery. Lewin brought his bungalow shortly after and began to engage in rackets, billiard and croquet while attending parties and other social gatherings. Lewin also formed a string quartet with the division commissioner Mr Bruce. Due to this his duty to fortify the station which was shelved and forgotten. Lewin was subsequently made municipal commissioner which gave him experience in taxation, rates, drainage and education. Lewin was also sanctioned a yacht for his tours and journeys among his duties as superintendent. The yacht was named Foam.

While waiting on his application to become superintendent of the hill tracts, Lewin's regiment colonel ordered a customary examination to show a continuation of fitness. Therefore, Lewin applied to the general commanding the Bengal Presidency division to appoint a commission to examine his fitness for promotion. Lewin attended the examining board in Calcutta in January 1865 and was gazetted a few months later.

Lewin initiated a district tour in the new year with a Magh interpreter, Sadu, and his son Apo to carry his pistol and hunting knife. They headed south towards the foothills and met with the tribes and their customs, such as zawlbuks. Lewin began to distinguish between the tribes inhabiting the river valleys and the wilder folk who built their villages on the hilltops. The former would be Maghs or Chakmas, who would be Buddhist, while the latter would be the hill people who would be animists. Lewin began to learn Burmese after considering a career in the colony of Burma. As Lewin was fluent in Bengali, Urdu and Hindi, he committed to Burmese. He sailed in his yacht Foam to Cox's bazaar after diagnosed with Malaria on doctors orders. Lewin was invited one night to a pwe where a troupe of Burmese performers pitched a camp on the grasslands outside town. The plays and music depicted the chronicles of the kings of Burma.

=== Superintendent of Chittagong Hill Tracts ===
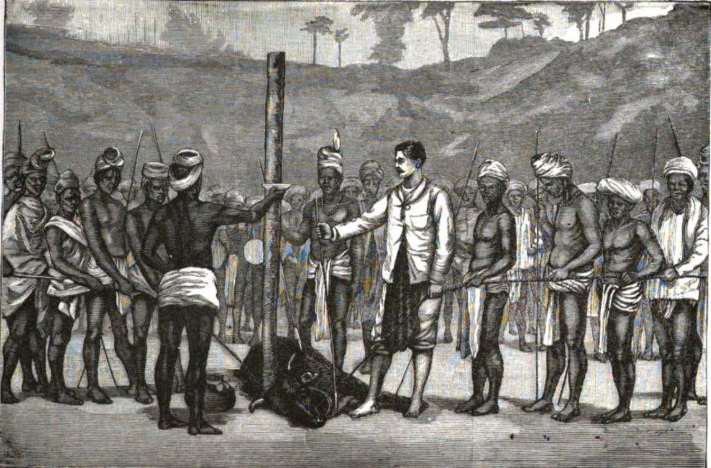
Lewin making an oath

After Lewin worked as a superintendent of police in Hazaribagh, Eastern Bengal, he was promoted to captain in 1865. In capacity of his role he established relations on behalf of the British to local chieftains such as Mong Raja, Kalindi (rani) and Rutton Poeia (Rothangpuia). After the kidnapping of Mary Winchester (Zoluti), Lewin was assigned political officer to Charles Henry Brownlow's column in the Lushai Expedition. Lewin accompanied the force dispatched from Demagiri into the Lushai Hills and their chiefdoms to punish Lalbura and Bengkhuaia.

Lewin began to write journals of his journeys to the Asiatic society of Bengal which Arthur Grote was president. Under the title 'Diary of a Hill Top on the Borders of Arracan' it was printed in the Proceedings of the Royal Geographical Society on 10 April 1867. Later the lieutenant-governor received a full account of Lewin's adventurous journey which coincided with the time of a Lakher (Mara) raid on a Mrung village half a day's march from the outpost at Chima. The raiders had crossed over between the Kaladan and Sangu rivers. As a result, Arthur Phayre was ordered to take steps to punish the offenders and release the captives they had taken which Lewin would cooperate under. Phayre proposed to appoint his own superintendent of the Arakan Hill Tracts to establish additional police posts in the hills. The Lieutenant Governor saw the moment as an opportunity to expand the authority and role of the Chittagong Superintendent to make him more accessible to the hill men. For this reason Lewin was officially assigned the Superintendent of Tribes in the Chittagong Hill Tracts which was announced in the Calcutta Gazette. At the same time, Lewin was promoted to captaincy in the 104th Regiment of Bengal Fusiliers. He was transferred to the Bengal Staff Corps which granted him the suffix of B.S.C.

Lewin moved into the Superintendent Bungalow built at Chandragona. It was situated eighty miles up the Karnaful from Chittagong. Three outposts were close by to keep watch of the independent hill tribes from raiding their territory. Lewin was in charge of three chiefs in the tract, namely, the Bogmong, the Kalindi rani and the Mong Raja who guarded their sovereignty. Lewin dedicated himself to empowering the three chiefs. The Frontier force needed to be reorganized as Lewin felt the current structure was inadequate to stop the Lushais and Shendus from raiding.

Lewin would subsequently receive a report of a Lushai raid on three Banjogi villages under the Bohmong chief, which saw four people killed and eighty men and women captured as bawis. Their houses and village were burnt down before the raiding party left. Lewin sent Routhangpuia, a Thangluah chief and British ally who was defeated by Captain Raban in 1861. Routhangpouia had acted as an informer on the neighbouring chiefs for which he was rewarded. Lewin decided to send Routhangpouia to investigate the rumours that Bohmong had destroyed the village himself for a dispute. Routhangpouia's messenger returned to Lewin with the information on the raid, stating that the Howlong clan had carried it out. The chief responsible was a brother-in-law to Routhangpouia. Lewin would set off in pursuit with a detachment of police and Lieutenant Scott to try and route the raiders. However, the force failed to catch up.

Lewin later met with Rothangpuia face to face after undertaking a journey via boat. Upon entering Rothangpuia's village his escort was requested to not be allowed in and he come alone. Lewin therefore entered with only an interpreter so that the party wouldn't alarm the inhabitants. Lewin remained in the guest room of Rothangpuia's house. The following morning he was summoned to the meeting of chiefs with Rothangpuia. Upon being asked why Lewin brought an armed escort to his village, Lewin made an excuse of the dangerous roads before exchanging gifts with Rothangpuia. A speech was made by another Lushai man. Before leaving, Lewin claimed to Rothangpuia and the chiefs that the British government bestows superintendents with immunity to bullets. He marked a bullet and, with sleigh of hand filled the rifle with a destructible component. Upon firing the rifle he feigned shock and slid the marked bullet into his teeth which impressed the chiefs.

On leave to Calcutta, Lewin stayed with Arthur Grote's family and met with a party of scientific men. In this meeting he displayed the cloths manufactured from the hill people and the language and phrases of their languages. Lewin had only established good relations with the Mong Rajah of the three most influential chiefs. The other chiefs were intolerant to reforms put forward by Lewin and began to bring their complaints to courts via petitions. Upon investigating who was supplying insider information for the petition, Lewin discovered the old Bohmong Rajah had suborned a havildar who was a hill man to keep track of Lewin's movements and to intercept official correspondence for him to read. To counter this Lewin secretly crossed the river via boat at night and broke into the Rajah's house. Upon being caught with official correspondence Lewin threatened him with prosecution unless he resigned. As a result, the Rajah's brother Mom Phru ascended and became a loyal ally to Lewin. Kalindi (rani) was a widow who ruled over the Chakma people in the hill tracts. She had earned favour with the British in 1857 by providing a number of Sepoys to capture mutineers from the Indian mutiny. Kalindi continued to oppose Lewin and obstruct his reforms. She even sent her grandson to Calcutta with money to spend on getting him transferred or removed. Rothangpuia hearing of the trouble offered Lewin an opportunity to settle and live with them which was ultimately declined. The tensions escalated when intruders were evacuated from his bungalow via rifle shots. Lewin had believed they were assassins sent by Kalindi. Lewin appointed a sentry for a while before placing his faith in a small statuette of the Buddha gifted by the Mong Rajah.

Later on, George Johnstone, a friend of Lewin's died. Before the death, an insight into Johnston's aid to Lewin had been uncovered. Lewin had been leaked confidential information by Johnstone regularly to advance his career. Lewin was informed of the position of becoming superintendent of the Chittagong Hill Tracts through a leak from Johnston. Johnstone had sent Lewin a letter warning of an official investigation into his involvement. Inspector-General Pughe delegated Officer Bowie to investigate Lewin's bungalow while Lewin was out on a mission to capture Lushai marauders. Nothing was found until a servant of Lewin pointed out Johnston's letter warning Lewin. The letter was forwarded to Inspector-General Pughe. Johnston admitted upon confrontation of his guilt. He handed in his resignation letter and sent his wife to a ball in a carriage, where he committed suicide via liquid chloroform in a sponge bag. Lewin wrote to the Inspector-General taking the responsibility instigating the matter. Lewin had a nervous breakdown soon after before staying at the Commissioner of Chittagong, Mr Young's house, to recover.

Lewin wrote a letter to the Lieutenant-Governor of Bengal about the conduct of Bowie, who held a personal grudge against him. However a reply was made of not becoming involved and causing a scandal. Lewin remained unrelenting and referred the case to the adjutant-general for consideration by the commander-in-chief to court-martial Bowie. Months later in January, the commander-in-chief communicated that there was insufficient evidence to court martial. Further attempts were made, but no official action was taken against Bowie.

Soon after, Mr.Young was replaced by Henry Browne, 5th Marquess of Sligo as Commissioner of Chittagong. Lewin originally did not get on with Ulick Browne. However, after another anonymous accusation against Lewin, Ulick Browne was appointed to look into it. Browne's report exonerated Lewin and commended his performance as superintendent. After being promoted to 3rd grade deputy commissioner he was given a European assistant and permitted to recruit Gurkhas for the frontier police force and acquired nine elephants for civil engineering works. Lewin's views on governance continued to diverge. The main issue was that Lewin opposed the central government's policy of paying the hill tribe leaders to maintain peace. However, an expedition into the Lushai Hills was also an impossible case for Lewin to argue about. Lewin reorganized the frontier force to his standards and established a comprehensive scheme of resettling the revenue systems. Schools were opened, and a Christian mission was established.

The government allowed Lewin to move his headquarters further towards the Lushai Hills and push the police outposts on the borders. While he was on official leave he used the labour of the hillmen, of which 300 helped build a house. The house was named the Barn House after a close family member. Lewin cleared the trees around the house and formed his own personal jhum, which he planted with grain, cucumber, melons, and cotton. He lived among the hill tribes and learnt their way of living through personal experience. This continued to the point that the hill tribes began to pressure Lewin to get married and settle down. He used the opportunity to prepare the book The Hill Tracts of Chittagong and the Dwellers Therein. This would be one of the earliest monographs of the hill tribes of northeast India. Lewin divided the tribes on convenience instead of scientific distinctions and anthropology. A philosophy was developed for the British administration to place the wellbeing of the people over the economic interests of the British Raj. Ulick Browne, in a report, congratulated the administration, which was described as being immune to raids. However, Lewin was forced to leave his former residence as his leave was nearly over. The hill people had begged Lewin not to depart during the ordeal, which made Lewin falsely promise to live amongst them his whole life.

==== Lushai Expedition ====
Lewin returned to Calcutta in January 1871 after a visit to Italy, Bomaby, Meerut and Agra with two friends. Lewin was summoned to a conference in April about the Lushai frontier along with John Ware Edgar of the north from Cachar. Lewin was considered an authority on the issues of the Lushai frontier. His knowledge was used to write memos and minutes alongside interviews with the viceroy Lord Mayo and the lieutenant-governor of Bengal with the military staff. Lewin's expertise were used to decide on a course of action for a punitive expedition against the raids of the Lushai tribes. Edgar's recommendation to conduct the Lushai Expedition became the consensus of the conference. A northern column from Cachar and a southern column from Chittagong would carry out the operations. Lewin opposed the decision on the basis that the expedition would be a breach of faith for the inhabitants of Chittagong who had come to trust him. Lewin considered the invasion should only have occurred from Cachar. However the council disregarded Lewin's moral concerns.

Lewin proceeded to Sylhet and equipped 200 troops for service in the hills. This would increase the frontier police force to a strength of 600 men. Lord Mayo promised Lewin at the expiration of a year his services would not be forgotten. Alexander Mackenzie, around this time, sent a letter detailing that Lewin was to remain superintendent until April 1972. This was because no other candidate was suited for the role at such a time. In July Lewin was officially assigned the political officer and interpreter of the southern column. The northern column was tasked with punishing the villages of Lalbura and Vanhnuailiana. The southern column would punished Bengkhaia and the Howlong clans to retrieve Mary Winchester.

In preparation for the departure, Lewin arranged the Bohmong Rajah to supply men to replace the frontier police at the outposts before removing them for timidness. He visited the Mong Rajah to recruit coolies to maintain the logistics of the operation. Even Kalindi Rani was contacted, in which she provided 16 Chakma riflemen as scouts and spies. An alliance with Rothangpuia was also formed. On 28 October, Lewin produced a will for his family in the event of his death in the expedition. Before leaving for the expedition, Lewin was visited by lord Mayo's secretary, who requested to send semi-official reports of the happenings of the expedition. Lewin arranged with the Calcutta observer to act as a war correspondent and to send anonymous articles on the expedition.

Rothangpuia met with General Brownlow and two minor chiefs through Lewin. Rothangpuia was hesitant to participate in the Lushai Expedition on account of retaliation by the tribes. Assurances were granted to Rothangpuia and the next three days were spent in consuming zu. Rothangpuia was tasked with being a guide for the road being extended to Demagiri. As the expedition party ventured into the Lushai Hills they began to experience desertions of their troops due to fears of the Lushais. Along the way the General met with Rothangpuia at his village, Lungsen, where a mithun was prepared as a feast. Lewin would record this feast as correspondent who would publish the article under an anonymous title. Lewin stayed the night at Lungsen while General Brownlow departed. He authorised the frontier police to guard Lungsen while Rothangpuia travelled with the expedition. Lewin also met Rothangpuia's wife and son. She placed her son's hand in Lewin's and asked him to take him to live with him after the expedition for the sake of education.

Despite Rothangpuia being allied to Lewin in the expedition he was of little help. This was in part due to Rothangpuia's poor diplomacy with the Sailo chiefs and their long standing feuds. General Brownlow described Rothangpuia's alliance as of a passive nature. Lewin also was undergoing recovery for bronchitis and fever at Demagiri. When Rothangpuia became reluctant to provide meat, fowls and rice to aid in rations for the force Lewin argued with Rothangpuia. He stated that it would be better for his tribe to be openly hostile than being useless as an ally. As a result, Rothangpuia left to his village and prepared a sacrifice to aid in Lewin's recovery. On 8 December Lewin captured Liangbura who was returning to a deserted village for remaining livestock. Lewin attempted to reason with the chief for two days to aid the expedition. Lewin seized Liangura's wife and daughter to Rothangpuia's village in order to force compliance. As Liangura was the brother-in-law of Savunga, he wished to use his relationship to influence the expedition. Liangura was placed as ambassador to the Sailo chiefs who were meeting at Vanhlula's village. Liangura brought the news that the Sailo clans were hostile and threatened to fire shots at the expedition if they advanced further into the Lushai Hills.

Vanhlula's village was attacked accidentally after a reconnaissance mission failed. A detachment of Gurkhas's under Macintyre observed the surroundings of the village while the larger detachment under Colonel Macpherson lost their way. When Macpherson approached the village they mistook the defenders for Macintyre's men on lunch. This prompted the Lushais to scatter into the jungles and cause a skirmish that would lead to three deaths for them. The same night, the village was set on fire by the Lushais. The expedition took possession of the remaining possessions, and Lewin instructed the hillmen coolies to build a warm hut for General Brownlow, who had become sick.

The skirmishes continued. This prompted Macpherson and Macintyre to attack some villages and burn them down. Lewin would record that the burning of jhums were all around him. On 23 December, Rothangpuia rejoined the expedition. Lewin had a long talk about the tea planter's daughter Mary Winchester, whose rescue was a goal of the expedition. Rothangpuia was sent back to his village to arrange for road extensions, furnish unhusked rice as fodder for the transport of elephants and send messengers to the Howlong chiefs who held Mary captive. On Christmas the column arranged a dinner for the officers with General Brownlow in which Lewin provided correspondence on a plum pudding presented there. The following day Lewin prepared signs in Bengali and Burmese stating that no harm was intended if they sent in upas for the delivering of captives. During the night the Lushais warned the sentries that the Sailos formed an alliance with the Howlongs against the Expedition and ordered them to leave. As a result, General Brownlow arranged to attack Savunga's capital village. On the route towards Savunga, Brownlow destroyed the village of Lalgnura who was son of Savunga. The following night Lewin was approached by Lushai scouts in the middle of the night claiming that Savunga wished to submit. Lewin offered a safe passage and to not burn their crops and grains. Rothangpuia who was with Lewin proposed that Savunga should be beheaded immediately on coming to camp. Savunga burned down his village the following morning leaving only his son Laljeeka's village the remaining settlement. As the Sailos were subjugated Brownlow focussed on the Howlong chiefs. Before an attack was proposed Rothangpuia was sent as a diplomat. This was because Rothangpuia was allied to the northern Howlong chiefs by marriage. Lewin accompanied Rothangpuia with an escort of 50 Gurkhas to convince the chiefs to arrive at General Brownlow's camp. However the burning of a Sailo village made him turn back out of fear of confrontation. Rothangpuia was sent with Subadar Mohamed Azim of the Chittagong frontier police. He was instructed to inform the Howlong chiefs that releasing of captives and free access through their villages was the only way to spare them from an attack.

During the wait for Rothangpuia's return the column attacked Laljeeka's village on 20 January. Lewin later received news that Mary Winchester had been recovered safely. On the way to Bengkhaia'svillage, a party of Lushais brought the little girl with them in order to offset any future confrontation with the column. Rothangpuia was left to maintain the rest of the demands and negotiations while Mary was sent with Mohammed Azim back to Rothangpuia's village with the frontier police. Later, Lewin wrote another article about Mary Winchester and how staying with the Lushais for a year changed her. Rothangpuia similarly requested an extension for his negotiations with Bengkhaia until 28 January. The following day the Howlong chiefs agreed to submit to the column and release all captives from the raids. The captives were released at Demagiri to prevent the soldiers from arriving at the settlement.

Seipuia and Vandula who succeeded the southern Howlong chief Lutpura began to coordinate with the column to release their captives as well. However a condition was made for this to be done at Rothangpuia's village out of distrust for the column. Rothangpuia returned from his diplomacy mission and was confident the chiefs would bring the captives. However, as there was no sign of the promise being fulfilled, General Brownlow issued an advance into the Howlong territories. Rations were restocked with twenty days supply before departing on 11 February. Lewin was assigned to reconnoitre the route with Captain C.J. East. Lewin was later visited by Bengkhaia's emissaries at camp. Lalbura also sent his emissaries, claiming to want to meet but distrusting the heavily armed column. Bengkhaia brought a mithun to be sacrificed if Lewin would agree to take an oath for his safety so that he could submit.

Lewin advised Brownlow to hold a few terms, such as releasing the captives, swearing an oath of friendship, and pledges to stop raiding and provide free access in the villages. He outlined that the fate of Lalchukla established a history fo distrust among the Lushais upon submission. As a result, Brownlow accepted submission of the chiefs proposed by Lewin. Lewin feasted with the chiefs and participated in the ceremonies. Lewin was handed a gun, a dao, a plume headdress of the bhimraj to show acceptance of him as their chief. A petition was also presented for Lewin to settle near their villages to make it easier to sort affairs. Lalbura met the column and also submitted. The expedition ended with Seipuia and Vandula releasing their captives and taking their oaths.

==== Later developments ====
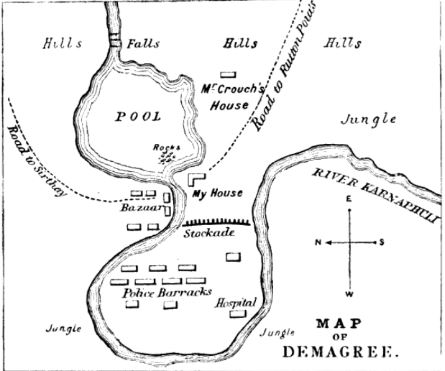
Map of early Demagiri

The General Council of India summoned Lewin after the expedition to discuss British policy on the Lushai frontier. The main resolution of the council oversaw no direct control over the tribes but a policy if exerting influence. A precise boundary line should be maintained with police outposts to check raids. Furthermore, a permanent post at Demagiri would be established under Lewin which assigned Lieutenant Gordon.

Lewin redistributed the remaining stores and rations by the soldiers to the Sailos in the nearby villages who had their food source destroyed during the campaign. Lieutenant Gordon was taken to visit Rothangpuia who had gained prestige for his participation in the Lushai Expedition. Lewin did not receive any awards for his conduct in the expedition. The generals received knighthood, and the officers were made companions of the bath, with Edgar granted the Star of India. General Brownlow placed a case before Lord Napier in support of Lewin, with Alexander Mackenzie and Sir George Campbell also lending their support. Many reasons were speculated with the most likely being Lewin's war correspondence articles and his critique of General Bourchier, which would have been seen as insubordination.

==== Life with Rothangpuia ====
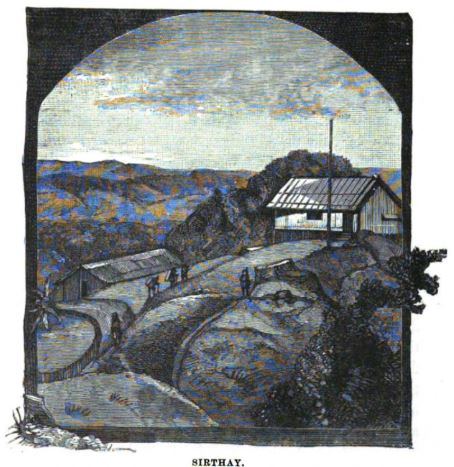
Lewin's Sirthay house

Lewin constructed a house surrounded by a strong stockade on Site Tlang near Demagiri for the headquarters of the frontier administration. Rothangpuia supplied labourers and built a traditional Lushai house known as Uncle Tom's Cabin. It was made of rough, unhewn logs with mud and bamboo matting for inside walls. His household hosted hill people as assistants, including Dari. The full name of Dari is debated but she lived with Lewin. She was a village girl unrelated to any chiefs. She bore Lewin, a son who died early in infancy.

Lewin also wrote many manuscripts during his stay. He studied the hill languages and wrote the unpublished A Grammar of the Aracanese dialect of Burmese for us by government officers among the Hill Tribes of the South-East Frontier of India. He also published The hill proverbs of the inhabitants of the Chittagong Hill Tracts which was reviewed in the Pall Mall Gazette.

Lewin invited the chiefs on the frontier for a visit to Calcutta. Rothangpuia was the first to accept the offer followed by Lalngura, Vanhnuaia, Lalchema, Lalnghura and two more chiefs. Seipuia was invited but did not wish to come due to his fear of a higher authority than Lewin exacting punishment. The chiefs asked if the Governor-General ordered Seipuia to be speared, would Lewin be unable to stop it, which would result in Seipuia's withdrawal. They left on 1 December to Calcutta. The chiefs refused to stay far or out of sight of Lewin out of fear of the Governor-General. Tents were pitched in Calcutta but no matter how Lewin had to attend to other matters the chiefs refused to left him leave them alone. As a result, the tents moved to Lewin's residence in Calcutta. The chiefs were not impressed by civilisation under the British apart from the solid silver sofa at the lieutenant governor's residence and a train ride. The visit led to a newspaper article on the visit of the Lushai chiefs describing their identities, their apparel and their drinking culture. At one point two of the chiefs got lost in the streets and were brought back to Lewin at night by a friendly policeman. They returned after a fortnight.

=== Superintendent of Cooh Behar State ===
With influence of his aunt and wife of the late Arthur Grote, the lieutenant governor Sir Richard appointed Lewin to the superintendent of Cooch Behar State. This was a princely state on the border of Bhutan. His primary responsibility was to look after the young king of fourteen years old and keep order among the 150 wives and concubines of the late king. Lewin arranged a grand reception for Sir Richard who arrived to inspect affairs of the state. He arranged 30 horses, 15 elephants, two carriages and two palkis to transport the party from the border to the capital. While in Cooh Behar, Lewin studied the Tibetan language under a Lama from Bhutan.

=== Later life ===
To gain kinship with the hill tribes bordering Chittagong, Lewin attempted to transcribe his name into the Lushai dialect which led to his Mizo name Thangliena being made. Captain Lewin studied the language, history, institutions and local mythology of the Mughs, Chakmas, Bunjoghis, Arakans and Burmese. Lewin published grammars and guides to the language and culture of the hill tribes through several publications. Lewin was then raised to Deputy Commissioner of Darjeeling and retired at 40 with a pension of £171 yearly for his 20-year service. Lewin in his retirement wrote A fly on the wheel, or How I helped to govern India. He prepared 25 black and white illustrations of which nine were used for publishing. It was an autobiography recording the Indian mutiny and subsequent career advancements in Bengal. He later was elected to the boards of the Cannock Chase Colliery Company of the Danish Gas Company. He took on a more executive role with countless meetings of officials and dinners, even visiting Hanover in Germany and Jutland in Denmark. Lewin later sold his shares as the profits fell with the electric light bulb mass production. He instead turned down an offer to become chairman and became a justice of peace at Dorking bench.

Lewin would come into contact with some Lushai affiliates such as James Herbert Lorrain who sent a letter informing of his fame and legend among the tribes.John Shakespear wrote to Lewin describing the changes since his administration and experience with the Lushais. Shakespear dedicated his monograph The Lushei-Kuki Clans to Lewin. After the publishing of A fly on the wheel, Lewin was contacted by Mary Winchester who had been saved by him. Lewin was reluctant to meet with Mary until Margaret's insistence. Lewin would remark to his daughter Everest on the meeting as describing Mary Winchester as "a stuck-up conceited little half-caste woman".

Lewin's last book would be Life and Death being an authentic account of the deaths of one hundred celebrated men and women with their portraits published in 1910. After the outbreak of World War One, Lorraine would send a letter to Lewin detailing the current events of the Chittagong Hill Tracts such as the death of Seipuia and the succession of Rothangpuia. Lewin's former lover, Dari, was also mentioned by Lorrain. Dari had remarried, and the letter detailed the death of her husband due to sickness while residing in Lungsen village. Her husband had killed a tiger in his lifetime and thus had a special funeral, which Lorrain detailed. Dari converted to Christianity late in life after most of Lungsen had converted. Lorrain detailed how she sent her regards to Lewin and adopted two orphans. Dari through Lorraine also sent her zawlpuan to Lewin. However, Lewin did not receive it as he was sick in hospital.

== Marriage and children ==
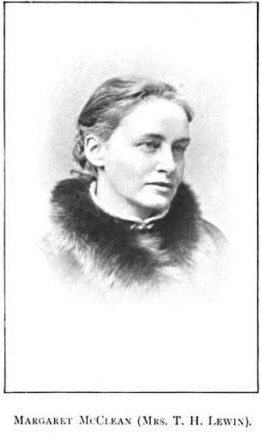
Margaret Lewin

Lewin lived with Dari at Lungsen under Rothangpuia. She gave birth to a son, who died in infancy. Later on Lewin married Margaret McClean on 24 July 1876 in Elham, Kent. She was a widow with three daughters upon their first meeting. McClean was the daughter of John Robinson McLean a Scottish civil engineer. They had three children consisting of two daughters, Everest Harriet Grote and Audrey Hale, with a son named Charles McClean Lewin.

== Death ==
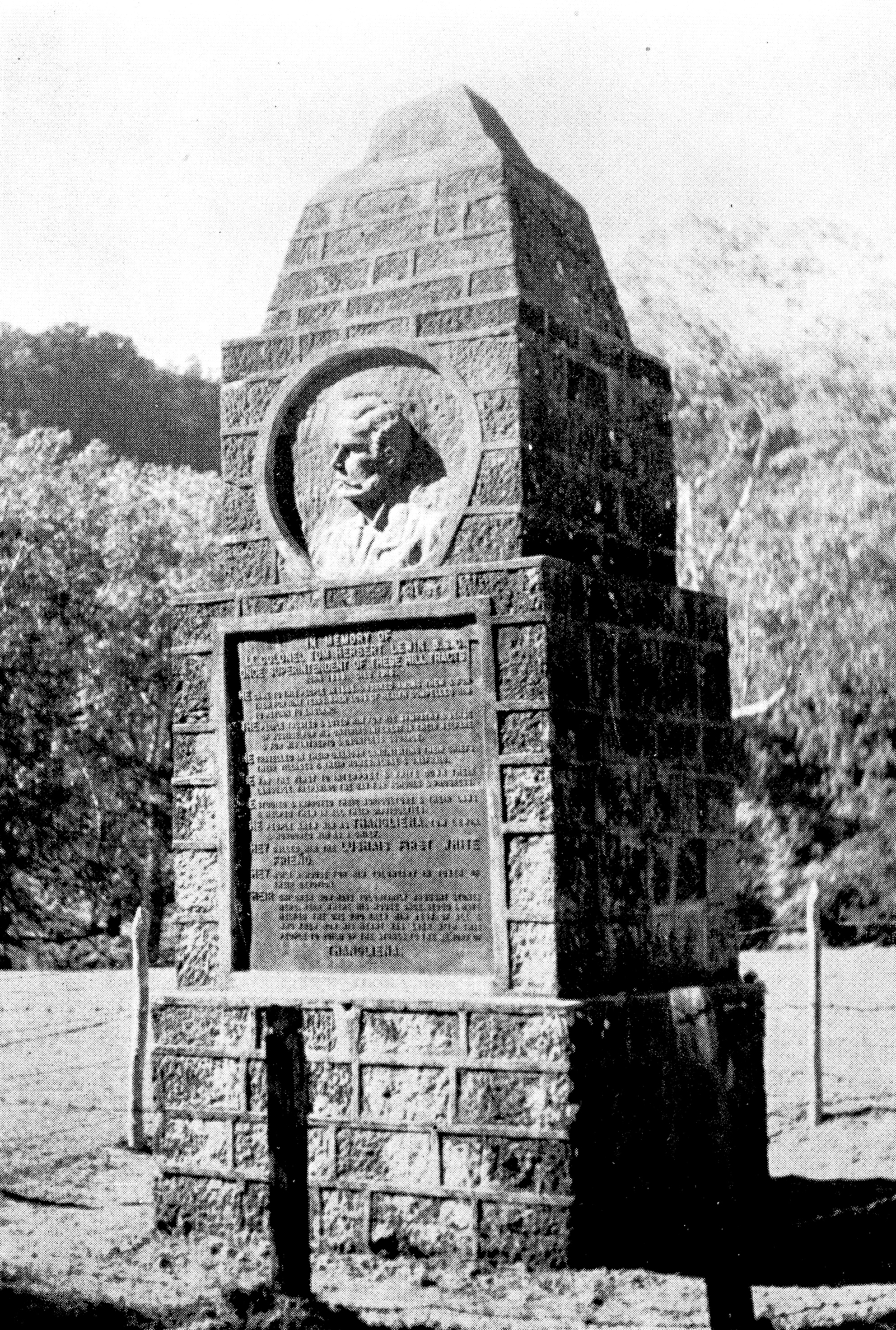
T.H Lewin's memorial erected at Demagiri.

Lewin's health began to decline due to an enlarged prostate gland which was inoperable at the time. He was put on a diet which enjoined no milk, no sugar and no eggs. On 2 February, he was placed under care for his teeth. On the 11th, Lewin fell down at 5:10. The doctor came out to his wife for brandy but, on return, found him dead. Lewin died on 11 February 1916 at Dorking, Surrey in England. He was cremated on 13 February at Golders Green crematorium. He was buried at Arbinger, Mole Valley District in Surrey. His will was probated 25 May 1916 in London.

A memorial for Lewin was erected in Demagiri,Mizoram. The inscription on the memorial is as follows:

In Memory of
Lt. Colonel Tom Herbert Lewin, B.S.C.
Once superintendent of these hill tracts
Born 1839, Died 1916

He came to this people in 1865, & worked among them & or them for nine years, when loss of health compelled him to return to England.
The people trusted him & loved him for his sympathyand sense of justice, for his untiring interest in their welfare & for his intrepid & dauntless courage.
He travelled in their unknown land, visiting their chiefs, their villages & homes, alone & unafraid.
He was the first to interpret & write down their language preparing the way for schools & progress.
He studied & improved their agriculture & their laws & helped the in all their difficulties.
The people knew him as Thangliena, Tom Lewin & honoured him as a chief.
They called him the Lushais first white friend.
They built a house for him voluntary in token of his devotion.
Their children now have voluntarily brought stones here, near where his house once stood & have helped the one who knew him best of all & who knew how his heart was ever with this people to build up the stones to the memory of
Thangliena.

— Lewin Memorial Inscription, Thangliena: The life of T.H. Lewin, John Whitehead

== Published works ==
- The Hill Tracts of Chittagong and the Dwellers therein (Calcutta, 1869)
- The Wild Races of South-Eastern India (England, 1870)
- Hill Proverbs of the Inhabitants of the Chittagong Hill Tracts (Calcutta, 1873)
- A handbook on the Lushai Dialect (1874)
- A manual of Tibetan (1879)
- A fly on the wheel (1884)

== Genealogy ==
Grote-Lewin Family Tree

Richard Lewin (7 issue) | Mary Brown
George Grote | Thomas Lewin (12 issue) | Mary Hale
John Grote | Arthur Grote | George Grote | Harriet Grote | George Herbert Lewin | Mary Friend
Margaret Elliot Lewin | Thomas Herbert Lewin | Mary Lewin | Harriet Browne | William Terriss | Isabella Stevenson | Friend “Bob” Lewin
Everest MacDonald | Charles Lewin | Audrey Waterhouse
Ellaline Terriss | Tom Terriss

== Sources ==
=== Archives ===
- Lewin, Thomas. "The Lewin Family Papers" (1926) [Collection]. Lewin Family Papers, ID: MS 811. London: London University Senate House Library.
- MyHeritage. "Thomas Herbert Lewin". My Heritage.

=== Books ===
- Hutchinson, R. H. Sneyd (1906). An Account of the Chittagong Hill Tracts. Calcutta: Bengal Secretariat Book Depot.
- Whitehead, John (1992). Thangliena: The Life of T.H. Lewin (PDF). Gartmore, Stirlingshire: Kiscadale Publications. ISBN 1870838068.
- Lewin, Thomas Herbert (1885). A fly on the wheel: Or, how I helped to govern India. London: W.H. Allen & Co.
- Lewin, Thomas Herbert (1909). The Lewin Letters. England: A. Constable & Company.

=== News ===
- McLynn, Frank (4 May 1993). "A bureaucrat goes native among the hill folk". The Independent. London.
- The Illustrated London News (25 April 1885). "The Hill Tribes of India". The Illustrated London News. Vol. 86, no. 2401. London: The Illustrated London News. p. 448.
