= George Bourchier (Indian Army officer) =

British Army officer (1821–1898)

Major General Sir George Bourchier KCB
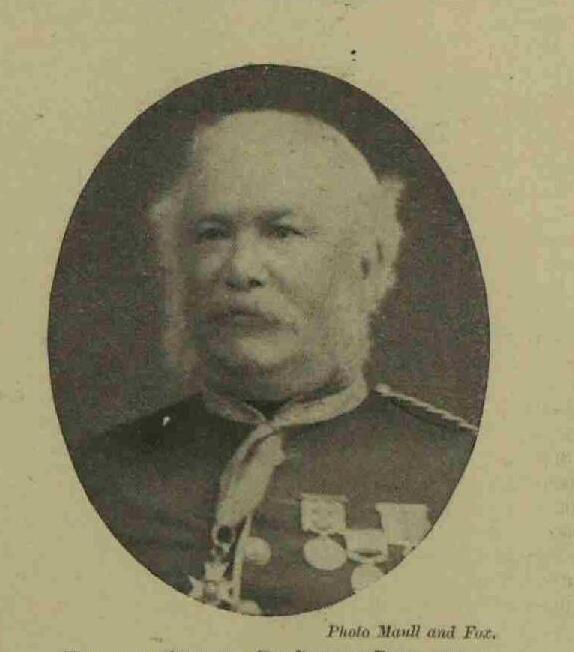
- Born: August 23, 1821; Bramfield, Hertfordshire, England
- Died: March 15, 1898 (aged 76); St Margarets, Twickenham, Middlesex
- Education: Addiscombe Military Seminary
- Spouse(s): Georgina Clementson Bourchier (m. 1853; died 1868) Margaret Murchison Bartleman (m. 1872; died 1881)
- Children: 7
- Relatives: Edward Bourchier (Father); Harriet Bourchier (b. Jenner, Mother)
- Military career
- Allegiance: United Kingdom
- Branch: British Indian Army
- Rank: Major-General
- Conflicts: Gwalior campaign Indian mutiny Lushai Expedition
- Awards: Knight Commander of the Order of the Bath

Major-General Sir George Bourchier KCB (23 August 1821 – 15 March 1898) was a British officer who served in the Bengal Army, one of three armies that made up the British Indian Army.

== Biography ==
Bourchier was the son of the Rev. Edward Bourchier and Harriet Jenner. He was the youngest son of nine children. He had five sisters and three brothers. His sisters were Harriet Jenner (Harris), Catherine Anne Jenner, Elizabeth Jenner (North), Louisa Jenner and Emma Jenner. His brothers were Edward Bourchier, Francis Bourchier and Robert James Jenner Bourchier. He was educated at the Addiscombe Military Seminary.

He entered the Bengal Artillery in 1838 and took part in the Gwalior campaign 1843–1844. He was stationed at Punniar.

During the Indian Mutiny he commanded a battery at Thimbu Ghat and was present at the siege and capture of Delhi. He was at Bulandshahr, Alighar, and Agra with Sir Colin Campbell for the relief of Lucknow and at Cawnpur.

He was commissioned a Brevet Colonel and C.B. From 1864 to 1866. he commanded the Royal Artillery in Bhutan. In 1871, he commanded the East Frontier District, and in 1871 to 1872 he commanded the Cachar column in the Lushai Expedition. He was awarded the K.C.B. in 1852 and promoted to Major-General. He died on 15 March 1898.
