= Mary Winchester (hostage) =

Political activist and raid victim (1865-1950)

- Portrait (c.1912)
- Born: 1865; Assam, British India (Disputed); Elgin, Moray (Disputed)
- Died: March 18, 1950 (aged 86); London
- Other name: Zolûti (among Mizo people)
- Citizenship: United Kingdom
- Education: Elgin Academy, Royal Moray College
- Occupations: Headmistress, Shopkeeper
- Known for: Advent of Lushai Expedition, Activist against the Bawi system
- Spouse: William (Harry) Innes Howie (m. 1887)
- Children: 3 (Frank, Molly and Peggy)
- Parent(s): James Winchester, Maya Memsab (Speculated)

Mary Winchester, or Zolûti to the Mizo people (later Mary Innes Howie; 1865–1950) was a British girl who was captured and held hostage by the Mizo tribes of Mizoram, India, in 1871, and rescued by the British expedition in 1872. This historic event marked the beginning of British rule in Mizoram that lasted until Indian independence in 1947. Indirectly, it also paved the way for Christian missionaries to introduce Christianity among the Mizos.

== Early life ==
Mary Winchester was born to James Winchester. The identity of her mother is not widely recorded and has been noted as either Scottish or a native woman. James Winchester was recorded to live with a local woman, a Manipuri lady known as Maya Memsab from Tarapur village of Silchar. Mary Winchester possessed a slightly dark complexion, which was explained by her bronzed skin due to staying in the Hills for so long until later reports surfaced the possibility of her mother being Kuki.

== Kidnapping ==
Mary Winchester lived with her father at Cachar, Assam, India. Her father was a manager of the British tea plantation, and had been there for 12 years. When she turned six years of age in 1871, her father decided it was time for formal education in Britain. Her farewell party was arranged on 23 January at Alexandrapur plantation at the place owned by her father's close friend George Seller. While they were strolling in the garden, the workers were suddenly in commotion, and Seller was frantically galloping around on his horse. When Mary accompanied by a nurse headed towards the bungalow, her father met them on the way who ran her to a stable. But then the Mizo tribal warriors caught up, shot her father down from behind and cut his head. The warriors snatched her away from the dying clutch of her father, who murmured, "Dear, only God knows your fate." They left him to die and carried the girl away. A number of people were killed in the clash, some were taken as hostages, including Mary Winchester. Probably all except the girl, of whom they took special care, died on their journey to Mizoram.

== In captivity ==
Mary Winchester, illustration from Cassell's Illustrated History of India, Volume 2

Mary Winchester was the first mixed race person most Mizos had ever encountered. Though a hostage, she was most of the time treated with good care. A reason for the good treatment entailed the novelty of her golden hair, which the Lushai tribesmen believed to possibly signal a heavenly body. But some warriors wanted to depose her for fearing the consequences. She was finally lodged in the house of Bengkhuaia, the chief of Sailàm, one of the most formidable chiefdoms. Her arrival in the village was celebrated with wine and meat, led by the chieftess. Not understanding her language to know her name, the Mizos called her Zolûti (Zo for "Mizo" or "Mizoram", lût for "enter"). The village chief then entrusted the girl under the ward of his most trusted woman, Pi Tluangi, wife of the village elder Vansuakthanga (grandparents of Vangchhunga, one of the first three Mizo pastors). Pi Tluangi eventually cared for her excellently, sleeping with her, and making garments and toys for her. Mary was given sugar cane to suck on and introduced her to their foraged traditional cuisines. Rumours did begin to circulate that white men were searching for the girl. The Mizos had previously believed that only a few white men were in existence in the tea estates, and that there would be less of them with raiding. When reports of a three column punitive expedition emerged, a few warriors wished to kill Mary to hide her from the soldiers. Pi Tluangi protected Mary and discouraged the decision to end Mary's life.

== Rescue ==
James Winchester was a native of Elgin and belonged to a prominent family in Morayshire. As a result, the MP for Moray and Nairn raised the matter in the House of Commons and led the issue of Mary Winchester's kidnapping to Queen Victoria herself. This pressure would lead to decisive action in a punitive expedition. The British colonial government launched a military campaign called the Lushai Expedition on 8 October 1871. An expeditionary force of the British Indian Army captured and occupied Mizo villages one by one. The column from Burma failed a river crossing, which delayed their arrival to the captive village. The other two columns from the North in Silchar and South in Chittagong did manage to reach the location on time. The right column of the campaign reached Sailàm village on 21 January 1872. The siege started at 08:30 in the morning, and after a few gunshots and shelling, the Mizos found their tribal weaponry no match to such advanced artillery and soon tendered their submission. After destroying the granaries and crops, the expeditionary force rescued Mary Winchester.

The moment of her rescue is told in two different versions:

1. according to T.H. Lewin, the expedition leader, Mary Winchester was simply taken from the chief's hut. She was found sitting on the log platform of the hut, wearing a blue rag round her loins, and a smoking pipe in her mouth. She was heard giving commands to small boys who were running around in fear. A few days short of a year in captivity, she had already lost her mother tongue, and the British soldiers had to lure her with sweets.
2. according to Sailam residents, the popular story is that she was handed over by the queen. Being completely adapted to the Mizo life, other British were strangers to Mary Winchester. She even called them, "Foreigners." Therefore, Pi Tluangi on pretence took her to a forest for gathering firewoods (or for cleaning at the stream, yet in another version). In the forest, her guardian left her to the awaiting soldiers, who had to drag her away against her will.

Upon rescue, later on General Brownlow who participated in the Lushai Expedition, wrote to Lewin stating that he was astonished at her grades knowing that ten years earlier she had little to no command of English. In 1912, Mary Winchester wrote a letter thanking T.H Lewin's command to rescue her in the expedition after missionary James Herbert Lorrain sent a copy of Lewin's book A fly on the wheel.

T.H Lewin met with Mary Winchester on encouragement of his wife. The resulting meeting was negatively received by Lewin who referred to her as "stuck-up, conceited little half-caste woman" in a letter to his son. In a separate letter to Major John Shapespeare he articulates his thoughts on the perception that Mary Winchester was the reason for the advent of Christianity in the Lushai Hills.

== In Britain ==
Mary Winchester was immediately transported to Calcutta and from there directly to Scotland. She lived with her grandparents in Elgin, Moray under William Winchester. She was received by the town of Elgin who anticipated her return and was personally visited by Queen Victoria herself. Her grandparents provided her with a generous education in England, which enabled her to become a dux of the upper class Elgin Academy. She graduated from Royal Moray College with distinction in 1892. After her education, Mary emerged as a sincere crusader of the civil rights movement in England. This is also where she met Harry Innes Howie. They got married after she got a job as headmistress and moved to London. In London they maintained a store which did well. She took up membership in a non-government organization which was known to aid the poor, downtrodden and labouring women. The organization also had branches in Indian cities such as Calcutta. It would aid opium addicts in Assam and reduce alcoholism among tea estate labourers.

Mary Winchester eventually met with F.W Savidge in London who made a lecture on the progress of Christianity in the Lushai Hills. After recounting the story of the raid at Alexnadrapur, Mary Winchester made herself known and narrated the story herself. She regularly continued to attend lectures under F.W Savidge and gave her testimony of the headhunting and Bawi system of the Lushai chiefdoms. In 1924, she met a Lushai Christian convert under Sir Herbert Lewis to greet him. Her recurring narration of the story and the ways of the Lushai chiefdoms, peeved the head of the Lushai Expedition that saved her, T.H Lewin, who refused to meet her in London and blamed it on her mixed blood. Meanwhile, her reputation in the Lushai Hills, flourished. Missionaries pushed the narrative that without her kidnapping, Christianity would never arrive to the Lushai Hills. Lushai Christian converts also went on sponsored tours to London to meet with Mary Winchester. Reverend Lorraine even quoted Isaish 11:6 as the forecast of Christian arrival stating that "a little child shall lead them".

=== Anti-Slavery and Aborigines' Protection Society ===
At some point in the missionary lectures, she met missionary Peter Fraser. Peter Fraser was campaigning against the Bawi system in the Lushai Hills before Mary encouraged him to join the Anti-Slavery and Aborigines' Protection Society. They brought up the matter of pre-existing slavery permitted by the British administration in the Lushai Hills. Fraser published a manuscript titled Slavery on British Territory: Assam and Burma to collate his experience and information on the Bawi system.

In support of Fraser's efforts to abolish the Bawi system, Mary supported him via a letter to the British government while the matter was being discussed in the parliament. She took care of Fraser during his travels to London and helped draft the memorandum of the Anti-Slavery and Aborigines's Protection Society to the British government. She outlined her experience as a captive and the Bawi system that is practised by the Mizo chiefs. Mary Innes Howie cooperated closely with Fraser and the British government to abolish the Bawi system. Fraser's mission was unsuccessful in the end and Mary's efforts went in vain.

== Family ==
Mary Innes Howie had three children: Frank, Molly and Peggy. Frank died on 11 March 1917 in a bomb blast while working as a private in France for World War One. Her daughter Molly never married. Mary Winchester died on 18 March 1950. She was 84 and living with her daughter, Peggy Douglas.

== See also ==
- List of kidnappings
- List of solved missing person cases
- Lushai Expedition
- History of Christianity in Mizoram
- Mizo Chieftainship
