= Nalinaksha Roy =

- Raja
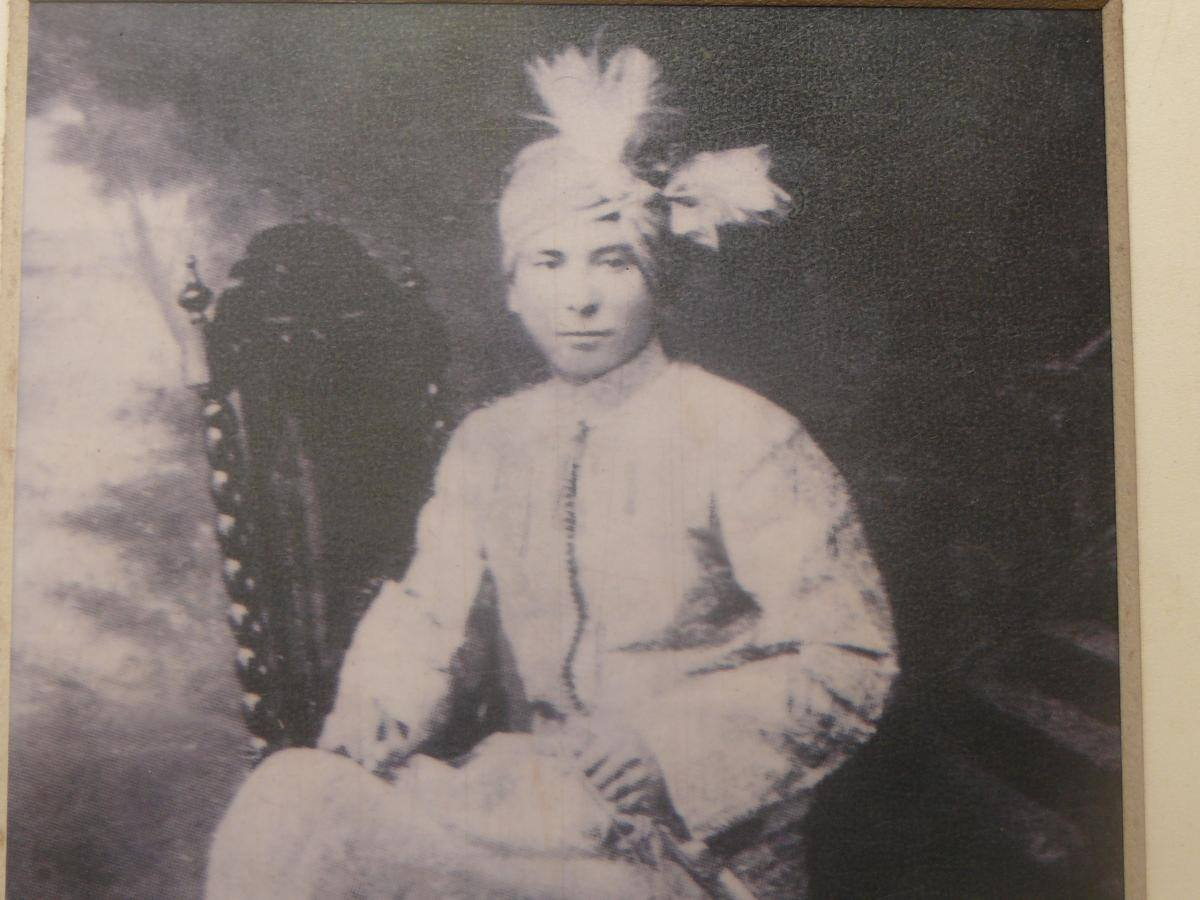

Chief of Chakma Circle
- Reign: 7 March 1935 - 7 October 1951
- Predecessor: Bhuvan Mohan Roy
- Successor: Tridev Roy
- Born: 6 June 1902; Chittagong Hill Tracts, British India
- Died: 7 October 1951 (aged 49)
- Spouse: Benita Roy
- Issue: Amiti Roy; Tridiv Roy; Samit Roy; Moitri Roy; Rajashree Roy, m. Maharana Jayasinhji of Dhrangadhra; Nandit Roy
- Religion: Theravada Buddhism
- Military career
- Allegiance: Chakma Circle
- Service years: 1935 - 1951

Raja Nalinaksha Roy (6 June 1902 – 7 October 1951) was the 49th Raja of the Chakma Circle.

== Biography ==
Roy married Rani Benita Roy (1905–1990) née Sen, the daughter of barrister Saral Sen and granddaughter of "Brahmanand" Keshub Chandra Sen, a Bengali Hindu social reformer from Brahma Samaj. He was installed as Chakma Raja on 7 March 1935.

Roy had three sons, Tridiv Roy, Samit Roy, Nandit Roy, and three daughters, Amiti Roy, Moitri Roy, and Rajashree Roy.

Roy met Sir John Anderson, the governor of Bengal, at Rangamati in November 1935 during the latter's tour of the Chittagong Hill Tracts District.

It was during Roy's reign that India and Pakistan gained independence in 14–16 August 1947 and the Chittagong Hill Tracts was assigned to the independent state of Pakistan, though the district had a 98% non-Muslim population.
