= Lushai Expedition =

British punitive expedition against Eastern Lushai chiefs

- Illustration of Vanhnuailiana's tomb found by the expedition.
Date	15 December 1871 - 20 February 1872
Location	Lushai Hills
Result	British Victory; Recapture of Mary Winchester (Zoluti); Subjugation of Pâwibâwia, Lalbura, Bengkhuaia and Savunga

Belligerents
British Empire: British Raj; Manipur Protectorate	Lushai chiefdoms

Commanders and leaders
(British Raj) Charles Henry Brownlow (British Raj) George Bourchier; William Frost Nuthall	Lalbura; Pâwibâwia; Bengkhuaia; Go Khaw Thang

Units involved
Chittagong Column; Cachar Column; Manipur Contingent	Tribal Militias; Raiding parties

Strength
2,500 infantry	Unknown

Casualties and losses
Unknown	Unknown

The British Indian Army Lushai Expedition of 1871 to 1872 was a punitive incursion under the command of Generals Brownlow and Bourchier. The objectives of the expedition were to rescue British subjects who had been captured by the Lushais in raids into Assam—including a six-year-old girl called Mary Winchester—and to convince the hill tribes of the region that they had nothing to gain and everything to lose by placing themselves in a hostile position towards the British Government.

For the British, the expedition was a success: the prisoners were freed and the hill tribes agreed to negotiate peace terms. The border region was to remain peaceful until 1888 when large-scale raiding was resumed and another punitive expedition was organised.

== Prelude ==
On the southern borders of Assam lay the Lushais, who were a section of the Kukis living in the hills that constitute present-day Mizoram. For many years, long before the British occupation, the inhabitants of the plains towards the south had lived in dread of the Lushais, who used to come down and attack the villages, massacring the inhabitants, taking their heads, and plundering and burning their houses.

The first Lushai raid mentioned as being committed in British-governed Assam was in 1826. From that year to 1850 the local officers were unable to restrain the fierce attacks of the hillmen on the south. Raids and outrages were of yearly occurrence, and on one occasion the Magistrate of Sylhet reported a series of massacres by "Kookies" in what was alleged to be British territory, in which 150 persons had been killed.

=== Lister Expedition ===
In 1849 the Lushai raids were so savage and numerous that Colonel Frederick George Lister, then Commandant of the Sylhet Light Infantry and Agent for the Khasia Hills, was sent in the cold weather of 1849–1850 to punish the tribes. His expedition was only partially successful, for he found the country so impracticable that he considered it unwise to proceed further than the village of Mulla which was about 100 miles (160 km) over the border. Mulla contained 800 houses and which he surprised and destroyed without opposition, all the male inhabitants being absent on a marauding excursion. The expedition also did manage to free about 400 captives, but Lister was of the opinion that "this robber tribe will not cease to infest the frontier until they shall be most servilely dealt with". This expedition, however, had the effect of keeping the British Assam southern border tolerably free from disturbance up to the beginning of 1862, when raiding recommenced.

=== Lushai Expedition (1869) ===
In the cold weather of 1868–1869 the Lushais burnt a tea garden in Cachar and attacked Monierkhal, and an expedition was organized to follow the marauders, to punish the tribes concerned, and to recover the captives. This expedition was in command of Colonel James Nuttall and consisted of three columns, but the monsoon rains coming on, the want of provisions and lateness of the season caused the expedition to fail in its principal objects. No tribes were punished and no captives were recovered.

== Background ==
The next season Mr. Edgar, the Deputy Commissioner of Cachar, accompanied by Major MacDonald of the Survey Department and a police escort, made strenuous efforts to get into touch with the Lushais. Accompanied by a small escort he visited them across the border and left nothing undone to conciliate and make friends with them; his good intentions and friendly attitude, however, met with little success, for 1870-1871 saw a series of Lushai raids on a more extensively organized scale and of a more determined character than any previous incursions of the kind.

Mary Winchester: Captive of the Lushai Raid at Alexandrapur

The first raid occurred in the Chittagong Hill Tracts on 31 December 1870, a little more than a day's journey from the Chima outpost. The raiding were about 200 strong. On 23 January 1871 the village of Ainerkhal, on the extreme west of the Cachar district, was burnt, 25 persons killed, and 37 taken prisoners. The same day the tea garden of Alexandrapore was destroyed by a party of the "Howlong" tribe under "Sanpoong" (Savunga) and "Bengkhuia" (Bengkhuaia). The Alexandrapur tea estate was owned by George Seller. George Seller invited James Winchester to spend Christmas at the tea estate. James Winchester was camping in Alexandarapur with his six year old daughter Mary Winchester from December 1869. On 23 January 1870, James had breakfast with his host outside his bungalow when a raiding party of the Howlong chief Bengkhuia descended on him and his estate. A number of labourers were killed and James Winchester was speared from behind in an attempt to escape. George Seller managed to escape unharmed. Winchester's child Mary, a girl of six years, was carried off as a captive among many others. The event became widely spread and publicised on the matter of two European planters being murdered and the kidnapping of a little girl of European blood. The rescue of this kidnapped little British girl became a major factor in the expedition that was to follow.

A few hours after the attack on Winchester tea garden (plantation), the adjoining garden of Kutlicherra was attacked, but the Lushais raiders were driven off by two planters. The following day a second attack was made on Kutlicherra, when two Lushais were wounded.

On 26 January the raiders surprised some sepoys and police in the Monierkhal garden, killed one sepoy, and wounded one sepoy and one policeman, and commenced an attack on the stockade and coolie lines. Reinforcements arriving they retired with a loss of 57 men killed and wounded. British loss being six killed and six wounded and one coolie missing. Simultaneously with the attack on Monierkhal a party raided the adjoining garden of Dhurmikhal, but did little damage.

Emboldened by their successes the raiders penetrated as far as Nundigram and on 27 January killed 11 and carried off three persons. The following morning they attacked a rear-guard of eight men, 4th Native Infantry, soon after they had left Nundigram; these fought most gallantly, only one man escaping. The Lushais lost 25 men on this occasion. On 23 February the Jhalnacherra tea garden was attacked by a party who killed and wounded seven coolies. Meanwhile, the Hill Tipperah and the Chittagong Hill Tracts also suffered, though not so severely.

== Expedition ==
The Government of India now decided that an expedition should be made into the Lushai country during the ensuing cold weather. It was decided that the force should consist two columns, the right advancing from Chittagong and the left from Cachar. General Brownlow, C.B., commanded the former, with Captain Lewin, Superintendent of the Chittagong Hill Tracts, as Civil Officer, and General Bourchier, C.B., with Mr. Edgar, Deputy Commissioner, Cachar, as Civil Officer, was in charge of the left or Cachar column. Colonel Frederick Sleigh Roberts was assigned senior staff officer of the force. He was placed in charge of despatching the stores and equipment of the columns until he joined the Cachar column under Bourchier on 3 November 1871. He would cooperate with Colonel Nuthall at Silchar to explore the route over the Burdban range before settling on a different entry point into the Lushai Hills.

In addition to these two columns, a contingent of Meiteis accompanied by Colonel James Nuttall, the Political Agent of Manipur, made a demonstration across the southern border to co-operate with General Bourchier's portion of the expedition.

The entire political and military conduct of the expedition was placed in the hands of the Military Commanders, who were specially instructed that the object of the expedition was not one of pure retaliation but that the surrender of the British subjects held in captivity should be insisted on, and that every endeavour should be made to establish friendly relations with the savage tribes and to convince them that they had nothing to gain and everything to lose by placing themselves in a hostile position towards the British Government. Lord Napier arranged for two officers with supreme authority in the military operations to offset the mistakes of single authority expeditions. he also instituted a system of integrating civil officers as advisors and channels of communications with the tribes who would answer to the column commanders.

The country's difficulty and terrain made the columns need to be lightly equipped. No tents were permitted to be taken, and items such as baggage and followers were to be reduced to a minimum.

=== Cachar Column Operations ===
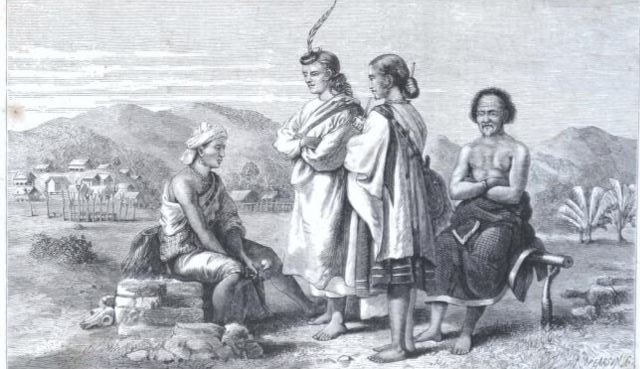
Illustration of Lushai, Poi, Lushai and Sokte man during the Expedition.

The Cachar column, which consisted of half a battery of Artillery, a company of Sappers, and 500 rifles, started on 15 December 1871. By the end of November, the column began to enter the Lushai Hills and was joined by John Edgar from Silchar on 6 December 1871. Colonel Frederick Sleigh Roberts joined General Bourchier on the 16th of November at the house of the civil officer and Deputy Commissioner of Cachar John Ware Edgar. The column left Cachar on 23 November 1871.

The force operated on the rationale that Lushai chiefs holding British subjects in captivity should surrender and release the captives. From the beginning the force was made to construct their own roads. Roberts described the road construction work continuing to the end of January, with 110 miles being made. Roberts relied on friendly Lushai tribesmen to act as guides for the column as the Lushai Hills were virtually unmapped. The roads were widened to six to eight feet wide for elephants to be able to traverse. Another issue was the dense forestry, which took up much time and labour to clear and cut down. The beginning of the expedition was difficult as cholera broke out among the Nepalese coolies on their way to join the column. As a result, 251 of 840 died with many desertions. In the end, only 347 coolies managed to join the column as a result. The elephants supplied for the expedition also were not fit as only 33 of the 157 provided were useful for the column. As a result of transportation difficulties, the carrying load and supplies were reduced to 40 pounds for officers and 24 pounds for soldiers, which Roberts described as difficult to keep within limit. Blankets and waterproof sheets were labelled essential as the terrain would be exposed to heights of low temperatures, and dew from the dense forestry would be described as heavy rain.

The 44th arrived at Tipaimukh by 9 December 1871. The Gurkhas and some local coolies used the abundant bamboo as construction materials in makeshift hospitals and store sheds with a camping ground for elephants. On the south beach, Commissariat and Ordnance, godowns were erected. The artillery and Engineer parks found accommodation while on the sandy plateau, an officer's quarter with a mess was established. Furthermore, the abundant bamboo was used for drinking vessels, makeshift bridges and even musical instruments. A trestle bridge was thrown across the Tipai river within the span of a few hours. Roberts had instructed an engineer to construct a bridge for the river crossing without delay, but it had not begun after a few hours of calculations. As a result, Roberts took the offer of the local natives to build a bridge at the river. In a short time, several men felled bamboo and threw them in the river, which men collected downstream. the bamboos were cut to the right length, attached laterally and longitudinally with a floor-bound and strips of cane, and prepared for crossing. The natives even tested the bridge with a march of men to test the integrity of the structure which astonished the sapper company engineer. The column was encamped on 13 December at the ascent of the Senvong range at an elevation of 4000 feet. The Lushai Hills and their settlements were observed this way. The observation saw the Tipai River, which, west of it, lay the jhums and cottages of Kholel. Further away in the south-east, the advanced settlements under Pâwibâwia (Poiboi) were observed. The force advanced through the Tipai River by a weir despite warnings and threats from the Lushais. The column did not respond because no first strike or attack from the Lushais would not warrant a violent interaction. On 14 December, the progress from the river focused on water access for the next encampment, which required increased reconnoitre for suitable camping grounds. The expedition began to slow as the roadmaking for elephants became increasingly difficult, and troops could ascend only very gradually. The column would cross the Tuibum River on 22 December, where they would meet with some Lushai scouts of the neighbouring villages to not advance any further. They offered that if the column halted then the upa of their villages would come and submit to the terms of the force. In return the villages were informed that there was no quarrel with them if the force were to be let through to the village of the perpetrator Lalbura unmolested. After pushing through the dense vegetation until a mile within the river, the force would encounter a road blocked by a curious erection of gallows that hung two bamboo figures. A little further, a felled tree on the path was studded with knife-like pieces of bamboo with red juice close to blood. The force took this as a warning of the Lushais but continued to bivouac until proceeding to villages observed ahead on their road.

On 23 December 1871, the column ascended on the hill where the Kholel villages lay and was fired at by Lushai volleys from uphill. The first thousand feet ascent was steep and narrow forcing the column to walk in a narrow file which led to the Lushais performing the ambush. A young police orderly acting as the guide was knocked over by Roberts side and a second volley wounded one of the sepoys. The force charged at the ambush before they retreated uphill. The force then encountered some jhums with more volleys from the Lushais firing. The force arrived into a village where they decided to remain for the night. The march had been taxing on the force as the village was 4000 feet above the river. Due to this the troops could not construct picquets and proper shelter of all the available timber. The sharpshooters continued to harass the force the whole night within the forests around the village before dispersing with the force leaving at dawn. The village they occupied had its granaries destroyed. Observation of the Lushai Hills from the village's strategic position revealed that the previous days march uphill 4000 feet was useless as it was going the wrong direction to Lalbura's village of Champhai. The force had no choice but to retrace their steps as far as the river. However, the men and animals were too tired to march that day along with Christmas to be celebrated the following day. As a result, the force retired from the village on 26 December. As soon as the pickets were drawn in, the Lushais staged an assault, believing the force was retreating. Roberts described the Lushais entering one end of the village, yelling and screaming before the force left. The Lushais continued to follow and attempted to get between the baggage before being foiled by the Gurkhas. The march out of the village led to casualties of 3 deaths and 8 wounded, the Lushais would confess to a loss of 50-60 in this skirmish after the expedition. General Bourchier chose to return to the Kholel village on account of not wanting the Lushais to believe the force had been defeated. A slight resistance was recorded at the first clearance, but upon reaching the ridge, the chief submitted and engaged in giving hostages keep communication at the encampment in Tipaimukh, which was a promise kept throughout the expedition. Another village a mile further on the ride was occupied and repurposed as a military encampment while a third village on the top of a mountain was captured and burned down that same evening. The force evacuated Kholel and encamped in the valley below the stream but were forced to mobilise uphill after being harassed by firing from the jungles. However the enemy surrendered immediately as the force arrived. Darpong, an upa of Poiboi, met with the column. He was described as clad in orange-coloured garments and accessories with a lofty plume. Darpong intervened on behalf of Kholel and in anticipation for Poiboi. Darpong offered a cessation of hostilities. Darpong would climb up a tree and make a call to the surrounding war parties and guerillas to stop to the firing of guns in the jungles. The Lushais, previously enemies, met with the column subsequently. On the 30 and 31 December 1871, more upas came with peace offerings which were accepted with the column. The camp was stated to be filled with pumpkins, fowls and ginger including some barters for watches and burning glasses.

On 6 January 1872, the column crossed Tuitoo affluent of Tipai at a ridge of a height of 3400 feet. They marched further to the village of Pachnee where they observed the principal northern villages of Poiboi eastward of their position. While the general stopped to resupply their stock and logistics, an opportunistic excursion was made to the old site of Kholel which formerly was the village of Vonpilal. The village had been burnt six days before the arrival of the column but the tomb of Vonpilal was intact. It was described as a monument centred on a large stone platform surrounded by poles hanging with skulls of wild oxen, deer and goats.

On 13 January 1872, the force advanced forward. A road was cleared by the 42nd and 44th from Pachnee to Tipai. The force was approaching closer to Poiboi, an influential chief in the region. Despite his upa Darpong staying with the column in their camp, the attitude of Poiboi to the expedition was considered uncertain to ascertain. The column's advances were unpopular to the Lushais under the vassal settlements of Chipooee and Tingridong under Poiboi, which was practically independent to some extent. The column was anxious to secure the neutrality of the settlements while the settlements were hesitant to accommodate the force in case it went against Poiboi's wishes. As the column ascneded to the settlement of Chipoee, Darpong and a crowd of Lushais were met. A imposter of Poiboi claimed to meet with the General. However, once discovered of this lie, the General warned them that he would now listen to no one but Poiboi in his own principal settlement. A party was left behind to patrol the settlements while three upas were taken as hostages.

The force set out southeastward. The force arrived at another mountain ridge before approaching two paths. The Lushais had placed warnings and threats of crossing the ridge. However, the general continued to pursue the ridge path without issue while later on the safer path was discovered to be prepared for an ambush. On 25 January, Darpong returned to the General at their encampment after being sent to summon Poiboi. Darpong warned the column that Poiboi would attack the column if he were to continue further. The general and his force would be attacked further on from all sides in a difficult terrain for the troops. The general was wounded, but the war party was driven off. The attack proved that Poiboi had sided with Lalbura and opposed the column. As a result, the column sent out parties to burn settlements on the neighbouring hills. The force also displayed their force by utilising artillery which caused the Lushais to flee their stockades and abandon their settlements. Investigation of the corpses discovered ammunition from the raids at Nugdigram which further validated the progress of the column to the goals of the expedition. Poiboi was warned via envoys that a heavy fine of mithun and other accessories with complete submission could compensate the mistake in opposing the expedition or else all his villages will be burnt.

The force would cross three ridges at great heights to the top of Lengting range to become into sight at Sellam. Darpong arrived with offering but it failed to stop the advance of the column. Sellam was found deserted by Poiboi and the column entered without resistance. The following day, Lushais arrived at the forces encampment. Thye argued that only Poiboi's submission could save their settlements. Poiboi did take initiative in this by sending emissaries to General Nuthall and the Manipuris however, no progress was made in his submission to General Bourchier in Sellam. At Sellam, the force assembled and prepared for their final operation to capture Lalbura.

Vonolel's Tomb illustrated in James Grant's "Cassell's Illustrated History of India, Volume 2"

On 12 February, the troops started upon the final stage of the expedition. Five days of marching southwards through the elevated mountain ranges and ridges brought them into full view of Champhai, where Lalbura resided. Lalbura was known as the son of Vonolel. On 17 February, the force entered Lalbura's settlement, which another force had besieged. The Manipur contingent withdrew due to disease outbreaks. Their absence inspired the Sukte tribes, enemies of the Lushais, to descend on Lalbura amidst the panic of the expedition. Lalbura had defended himself from the Sukte chief Kam Hau with heavy losses. Due to this, Lalbura deserted his village and burned it to the ground. Only Vonolel's tomb was untouched by the burning of the settlement. Vonolel's widow, Rolianpuii was known to reside on a neighbouring hill. Her settlement was fined war gongs, mithun, goats which she readily paid. A peace agreement was made with Rolianpuii on behla for Lalbura that:

- British agents would have free access to the village.
- Three hostages would accompany the force to Tipaimukh if Lalbura could not be surrendered into their custody.
- Arms and guns taken from the raids at Moinerkhal and Nugdigram would be surrendered. If unable to, then their own weapons would compensate the ones looted.
- A fine of two elephant tusks, a necklace, and a war gong. Along with the fine, a number of animals were demanded, consisting of four mithuns, ten goats, ten pigs, fifty fowls and twenty maunds of husked rice.

If the last two terms were unable to be completed, then the column would attack the settlement of Rolianpuii in Chawnchhim on the 20th of February. The column moved to Rolianpuii's village of Chawchhin. Difficulties were proclaimed in collecting the muskets but the quota was fulfilled by nighttime and three upas were chosen to accompany the column to Tipaimukh.

Poiboi had met with the Lushai assistants under John Edgar but still did not commit to come in and sue for peace. The column considered this one of its failures. However, the force returned to Cachar without any attacks.

In January and February 1872, the expedition saw an immigration of captives under Poiboi and Lemkham. A total of 649 captives were rescued and 2,112 refugees cross to Manipur to request protection from the King. The captives and refugees arrived at the Manipur camp at Chivu. Statistics of the refugees showed 373 being Sukte who took refuge with the Lushais during famine, 967 Paites who were vassal of Poiboi's villages, 110 Soomties who were vassals of Kam Hau's Sukte settlement and 612 Lushais from Bomhung's villages which had been destroyed by Kamhau. The king of Manipur assigned plots of land in the Thangjing hills and the neighbouring valley areas. Food was also provided until the settlers could become subsistent.

=== Chittagong Column Operations ===
Thomas Herbert Lewin as a political officer of the Chittagong Column, began to make preparations. In Rangamati guides and coolies were collected from different tribes and chiefs. The frontier police of the Chittagong Hill Tracts were further strengthened and better equipped with European officers, who were added to the force after Lewin had an interview with Lord Mayo. The campaign began on 8 October 1871. On 28 October, Lewin met with General Brownlow assigned to lead the column. Lewin was assigned an assistant known as Mr. Crouch. The 2nd Gurkha Regiment commanded by Colonel H. Macpherson arrived first to join the column. Rothangpuia with two minor chiefs on 12 November offered full support to the expedition. Lewin endeavoured to let Rothangpuia meet with General Brownlow. Brownlow would visit Rothangpuia's village on 22 November with an escort of the 2nd Gurkha regiment. A mithun was killed in spirit of the occasion and zu was distributed to everyone. After the departure of Brownlow, Rothangpuia voiced his hesitation of supporting the expedition and desired neutrality. This was due to the threat of retaliation of the Shendu chiefs in the future. Lewin assured a detachment of frontier police in his village in response.

To prepare an influential intermediary, Lewin tried to contact Chief Lengura to no avail. Upon arriving to his village it was deserted with the exception of the domestic livestock. The party set up an ambush which successfully captured Lengura when he came back to retrieve his mithun. Lengura after two days of negotiations agreed to aid the column. He was despatched to a Sailo chief known as Vanlula. This was to reassure the Sailo chiefs not to interfere as the expedition was aimed at Howlong chiefs. On 13 December, Lengura returned and informed that five Sailo headmen assembled at Vanlula's village and refused to comply. They threatened to attack if the column approached further unless they evacuated from the Lushai Hills. General Brownlow made a decision to attack Vanlula's village the following morning. An advance was made with two parties. Major MacIntyre of the 2nd Gurkhas feigned an attack while the main regiment crested the hill and overran the settlement. As a result, the enemy bolted with one man dead and carrying away two-three wounded. At the very first shot, Vanlula set fire to his own village denying the column's ability to occupy it. The remaining property were used as shelter while scouts were ordered to track the enemy. The scouts at sunset returned to report that the Sailos had retreated north with skirmishes of lost articles and a corpse. Among the articles the scouts found a coat belonging to a man of the Frontier battalion under Lieutenant Stewart implicating the Vanlula as a participant in the raids. General Brownlow ordered a depot to be improvised at the remains of Vanlula's village and to find any grains or stores to adequately live of the resources of the land.

Rothangpuia accompanied Lewin but was on bad terms with the Sailo and Howlong chiefs, complicating Lewin's diplomatic ability to retrieve the British captives. The column's communication was also interrupted by the Lushais, who attempted attacks on the mail bringers but ultimately defended the party successfully. On 21 December, Colonel MacPherson assaulted and occupied the village of Lalhlira. The rest of the party observed the battle until Macpherson telegraphed success via a flag signal that no losses were made on his party. Major MacIntyre similarly travelled north, burnt two villages, and destroyed 56 granaries. Despite one of the villages being strongly fortified, the Sailos abandoned it at defence. As a result, the livestock was captured, which supplemented the column's logistics. Christmas day saw General Brownlow invite all officers to dine with him and consume a plum pudding together. The following day the column occupied the village of Van Hnoya with no opposition. Travelling further on the party discovered the villages of Vankunga and Van Hnuna which were set on fire by their villagers. Lewin attempted to send Rothangpuia to prevent the burning but failed.

== Manipur Contingent ==
The Manipur contingent was made to cooperate with the Brigadier General Bourchier's column. Bourchier intended to exert pressure on the Lushais east of the Tuivai river by having troops occupy along the southern frontier to the Lushai Hills. A large force was stationed at Moirang in case it needed to operate there according to Bourchier's plans. General Nuthall was given discretion in setting up the posts and placed goals to keep the Kamhau tribes in check.

However a Kamhau deputation met with Nuthall and offered themselves to aid the expedition with permission to attack the Eastern Lushai villages. Nuthall however denied permission for them to carry out the attack. The Manipuris however informed Nuthall that the Kamhaus would not heed his refusal. As a result, Nuthall ordered them to send in hostages to curb "the warlike activities". To maintain pressure on the Kamhaus, Nuthall without Bourchier's permission moved south to Chivu. By February 1872, the contingent caught disease and provisions began to run out. Bourchier concluded the expedition and Nuthall was to make his way back to Imphal. On the way back, nine miles away from Chivu, Nuthall came across several hundred Kamhaus with over one hundred armed with muskets in their camp. The Kamhau chief Go Khaw Thang of Mualpi was recognised by a Thado trooper as being responsible for a raid in Manipur in 1872. The Meitei majors, Major Sawai Chumba and Major Thangal, told Chief Go Khaw Thang that he had committed a trespass by raiding their villages and should meet with Nuthall. However, Go Khaw Thang refused and was instead apprehended. After a skirmish, 57 men were transported to Imphal and placed in jail. Nuthal supported the action of confiscating their muskets and detaining unruly chiefs raiding the Lushais. However, Bourchier and John Edgar both called the conduct to be treachery. Since Go Khaw Thang had no intention to attack the camp, the actions were excessive and the two majors made an excuse for unruly conduct. Since Bourchier never ordered Nuthall to venture to Chivu, all subsequent chains of actions were also considered unauthorised.

In his report, Edgar claimed that the party at the camp was under the expectation of a friendly altercation with the Meitei. Especially as they placed children, women and refugee property before them in the camp. The Suktes had not aroused suspicion even when the sepoys surrounded them. The Kamhaus thus sent an embassy led by Kai Khual, Thang Zam and Ling Awi. The delegation was sent by Kam Hau's son, Za Tual to plead the release of Go Khaw Thang and the prisoners. The delegation was turned away. However they returned with four captive women and an elephant tusk for the Manipuri king out of goodwill. One of the captive women informed Colonel Mowbray Thompson, that the first delegation had tried to ascertain if Go Khaw Thang would be released. If not they had planned to invade and raid Manipur. A thousand Thadous had already migrated to Burma to avoid the confrontation. The threat was taken seriously and preparations were made to fortify the frontier. Kai Khual out of goodwill listened to Thompson's demand and returned 26 captives from previous raids. Thompson thus convinced the Manipur king to release 26 Kamhau captives in return. Kai Khual thus returned for the fourth time with 14 captives but Go Khaw Thang had died in prison by that time. It is unknown if Go Khaw Thang died of sickness or was tortured to death due to harsh treatment. Due to the proximity of cholera outbreaks in the time period, scholar Pum Khan Pau argues that Go Khaw Thang died of cholera in prison, if not torture.

On 16 march 1873, Kai Khual and the political agent with the King of Manipur signed a peace treaty on the banks of the river at Imphal. Both parties restored captives and Kai Khual received the release of Go Khaw Thang's remains for his son Sum Kam.

== Aftermath ==
Assam now enjoyed comparative peace until 1888-1889, when the hillmen raided into Chittagong, and Assam furnished a force of 400 police under the command of Mr. Daly to co-operate with General Tregear's column. Entering the hills from Cachar, the police, with a detached force of the Chittagong column, attacked and destroyed several villages which were implicated in the raids into Chittagong in 1888. When the troops retired at the close of the operations, they left two posts in the North Lushai hills—one at Aijal, the other at Changsil—and a Political Officer was appointed to administer the North Lushai Tract, with headquarters at Aijal. In 1891, another British column was murdered, leading to the Chin-Lushai Expedition of 1889-90.

== Sources ==
- Brown, R. (1874), Statistical Account of the Native State of Manipur and the Hill Territory under Its Rule, Calcutta: Office of the Superintendent of Government Printing
- Lewin, Thomas Herbert (1885). A fly on the wheel: Or, how I helped to govern India. London: W.H. Allen & Co.
- Low, Charles Rathbone (1883), Major-General Sir Frederick S. Roberts, Bart., V. C., G. C. B., C. I. E., R. A., a Memoir, London: W. H. Allen and co., p. 110
- Nag, Sajal (2018). "Shaming the self, negating history: Advent of evangelicals and transformation of a community in colonial North East India". In Seshan, Radhika; Kumbhojkar, Shraddha (eds.). Re-searchinhg Transitions in Indian History. New York: Routeledge. ISBN 978-0-429-48756-9.
- Reid, A.S. (1893). Chin-Lushai Land: Including a description of the various expeditions into the Chin-Lushai Hills and the final annexation of the country. Calcutta: Thacker, Spink and Co.
- Roberts, Frederick Sleigh (1898). Forty-One years in India from Subaltern to Commander in Chief. London: Richard Bentley and Son.
  - Pau, Pum Khan (2020). Indo-Burma Frontier and the Making of the Chin Hills: Empire and Resistance. Taylor & Francis. ISBN 978-1-138-38460-6.

Attribution

- . A note on page 16 states that: "This account is condensed from Mackenzie's North-Eastern Frontier of Bengal, pages 313–316."
- Woodthorpe, Robert Gosset (1873), The Lushai expedition, 1871-1872, London: Hurst and Blackett
