= Rothangpuia =

Chittagong Hills Mizo Chief (d.1873)

- Predecessor: Lalpuihluta
- Successor: Lalchheuva
- Died: 1873
- Issue: Lalchheuva; Thailala
- House: Thangluaha
- Father: Lalpuihluta
- Religion: Sakhua

Rothangpuia (d. 1873; English: Rutton Poea) was a Mizo chief of the Thangluaha dynasty. Rothangpuia established himself in the Chittagong Hill Tracts and became a British ally after the Raban Expedition. He would become a close ally of Thomas Herbert Lewin and participate in the Lushai Expedition.

== Chieftainship ==
Rothangpuia was a chief located on the ridges of the Ramgarth ranges on the Feni River. Rothangpuia amassed a reputation as a wealthy chief while also being close to Demagiri. Rothangpuia was originally considered ferocious for his daring raids in Tripura, Chittagong and Cachar. Due to the pressure of Sailo chiefs, his clan settled west from Chawngtui to Thorang Tlang. Rothangpuia settled at Lungsen. At the time of the Lushai Expedition, he then shifted his village 6 miles east, where it would be known as Demagiri. Following Demagiri, he would settle at Tiante, Mullianpui West and Kanghum.

Rothangpuia is recorded to have been at war with a powerful Sailo chief known as Savunga. To end their feud, they decided to take the oath of Saui Tan. Savunga invited Rothangpuia to cross the river but Rothangpuia declined on account of Savunga's large party of men accompanying him. As a counter offer Rothangpuia invited Savunga to his side of the river. Savunga let twenty of his men accompany him until Rothangpuia cut the ferry rope and isolated Savunga on his side of the river. Rothangpuia is stated to have said "I have now captured you and you have become my slave. If you wish rather, let us fire a gun at each other." Savunga decided to carry out the saui tan oath. When the heart and liver of a dog were ready to be eaten, Rothangpuia invited Savunga to take the meat first as the elder of the two. However when Savunga asked Rothangpuia to consume the meat , Rothangpuia replied "As you, who are the elder, have already eaten it as through we have both eaten" and saying this he left Savunga. In a sense, Savunga was bound to an oath of peace while Rothangpuia was not.

Rothangpuia was responsible for the raid on Munsir Khal bazaar in Tripura. It is believed that the king's brother, Nilkrishna Thakur, cooperated with Rothangpuia to make the raid happen. A translator under Thomas Herbert Lewin named Ramoni recounts a story of a raid on a Bengali settlement before Rothangpuia allied with the British. Ramoni was a bawi under Rothangpuia before Lewin ransomed their freedom. The raid saw the Bengali men run away, with the exception of all those who were speared down. The young women and children attempted to escape, but most were caught and captured alive. The men were killed, with the exception of healthy young men younger than fifteen. Women under 30-35 years old were tied by the thumbs with their arms behind their backs. A cord was run through the lobes of the ears to keep them in a line. If a hole was not large enough, then a knife would be used to enlarge it. Ramoni recounts being ordered to spear a woman with swollen ankles who could no longer walk. When the women begged for mercy and Ramoni could not accomplish it, Rothangpuia insulted him. Ramoni attempted to spear the women, but he did not fully succeed with his eyes closed. Rothangpuia took the spear and killed her in one blow, and ordered him to lick the blood on the spear to strengthen his heart. The village was recorded to be reduced to ashes with 182 persons killed and 100 made captive. Many more incidents of captives being killed due to being unable to walk were surfaced. For this outrage the Raban Expedition would target Rothangpuia.

== Anglo-Lushai Relations ==
After the Raban expedition, Rothangpuia became a British ally. Rothangpuia sent his karbaris to meet with Thomas Herbert Lewin, the superintendent of the Chittagong Hill Tracts. They met with Lewin in Kassalong to express the desire to maintain friendly ties with the British and for his people to be trusted as merchants and traders at the frontier markets. Lewin formed an intention to meet with Rothangpuia. After being warned that Rothangpuia had murdered or caused the murder of a sergeant and two frontier policemen in a friendly message, Lewin decided to meet Rothangpuia himself. Lewin ordered his jemadar to form a party to accompany the twenty best men. After two days of encampments and travelling via river, Lewin arrived at Rothangpuia's settlement. The karbaris accompanying Lewin entered into conversation with the Pasalṭha guarding the settlement with fire-locks. After a deeper travel and climb, Lewin arrived in Rothangpuia's settlement surrounded by 40-50 armed men. Rothangpuia was summoned by Lewin's karbaris. Rothangpuia would formally invite Lewin into the village proper, but without his armed escort, out of consideration for the village's women and children. Lewin proceeded while his men encamped outside Rothangpuia's settlement. Lewin was granted a guest house by Rothangpuia before setting out to gather the neighbouring chiefs to be formally inducted into the family circle. The next day, Lewin was summoned to the chief's house, where Rothangpuia and the other chiefs were assembled. Lewin described Rothangpuia as a physically small, dark, athletic man, with a melancholy cast of countenance and large, stern eyes. Rothangpuia wore no ornaments or insignia typical of a chief apart from fine clothing.

After a long pause, Rothangpuia questioned Lewin why he brought an armed escort to his village, which Lewin's karbari translated for him. Leiwn justified it by stating that the journey to his village was dangerous, and now there is no need for it on arrival. Lewin stated his appreciation for Rothangpuia's denials of the raids being committed in the south and confirmed the Anglo-Lushai friendship between them. Rothangpuia did not reply but handed out cups of zu to him and all the other chiefs. Lewin made a risky remark as he stated, "the prevention of such occurrences (raids) is my duty or, when not preventable, we can punish our enemies, and Rutton Poia knows what I say is true." Lewin states that Rothangpuia took big gulps and stuttered in his response. Rothangpuia asked if the previous superintendent, Captain Magrath, was a magician with a charm against shot and steel. Lewin answered that all British sahibs have this charm. Lewin subsequently retrieved a gun to make an example of his statement. Using a marked bullet which he crossed on, he measured the powder and prepared the shot. He ordered the karbari to shoot him in the chest. After the shot was fired, Lewin feigned a physical shock before placing his hand over his mouth and retrieving the marked bullet from his teeth. Lewin changed the pewter bullet of the Lushai for a waxen ball carefully blackleaded. When the gun fired, the waxen ball was fragmented, and the marked bullet was concealed under Lewin's thumb. Before firing, Lewin covered his eyes to conceal the power and wax from his eyes, but placed the bullet in his mouth. The meeting concluded with Vanlula making a speec,h and a formal alliance was forged offensive and defensive by sacrificing a mithun.

Another incident recounts how when Lewin was in an inquiry with a higher official, Rothangpuia offered via his karbaris to join his settlement. He further offered that each chief will build him a house with many men to follow him on account of his being bulletproof. Another incident recounts a visit to Rothangpuia's village, where a drunk man rudely pushed Rothangpuia. When Lewin questioned why he did not punish the man, Rothangpuia explained that the man was at home and all equal, on the war path, disobedience would be punished with death, but also on account of a man's drunkenness, he is incapable of disrespect.

At the start of the Lushai Expedition, Lewin alerted Rothangpuia to the warlike preparations in the Lushai Hills and not to be alarmed. The assistant political officer, Crouch, was sent to clear a camping ground at Demagiri close to Rothangpuia's village. Rothangpuia, accompanied by two minor chiefs, arrived on 12 November 1871 and offered his support for the cause, providing all assistance within his power. As a result, Lewin introduced Rothangpuia to Charles Henry Brownlow, who visited his village on 22 November. A gayal was killed in honour of the meeting and a round of drinking zu. Rothangpuia held a meeting with Lewin after General Brownlow left. Rothangpuia wished to remain neutral because supporting the British would invite hostile powers to destroy him after the expedition. In return for cooperation, Lewin promised Rothanguia that a detachment of police would be placed in his village, which led to Rothanguia's support for the Lushai expedition. As a result, Rothangpuia's wife brought their ten-year-old son and placed his hands folded in Lewin's, as a recognition of him as protector and suzerain.

Rothangpuia's involvement in the Lushai Expedition would earn him disfavour with the Howlong chiefs of the Southern Lushai Hills. He was charged with treachery for bringing the English to them and their settlements. Rothangpuia's daughter-in-law, who became a widow, was known as Pakuma rani. Rothangpuia, fearful of the reprisal of the Lushai chiefs, moved him and Pakuma Rani's villages into British territory after they refused to fight his enemies under a non-intervention policy.

== Death ==
Rothangpuia died in the December winter of 1873. Rothangpuia was succeeded by his son Lalseva in 1876.

== Genealogy ==
Thangluaha Chiefs Family Tree

Zahmuaka
Thangluaha
Khawchhiaha	Lalhrilha
Lalthlura	Zahuapa	Lalthlana
Ropuiliana
Lalpuihluta
Rothangpuia
Lalchheuva	Thailala
Sangkhuma	Suakhnuna

== Sources ==
- Chatterjee, Suhas (1990). Mizo Encyclopaedia. Aizawl: Jaico Publishing House.
- Lewin, Thomas Herbert (1885). A fly on the wheel: Or, how I helped to govern India. London: W.H. Allen & Co.
- McCall, Anthony Gilchrist (1949). Lushai Chrysalis. London: Luzac.
- Chambers, O.A. (1889). handbook of the Lushai Country with Map (PDF). Calcutta: Superintendent of Government Printing.
- Zawla, K. (1964). Mizo Pi Pute leh an thlahte Chanchin. Aizawl: Gosen Press.
- Zorema, James (2021). The South Lushai Hills. Delhi: Mittal Publications.
