= Palak Dil =

Lake in India

Pala Tipo
- Palak Dil
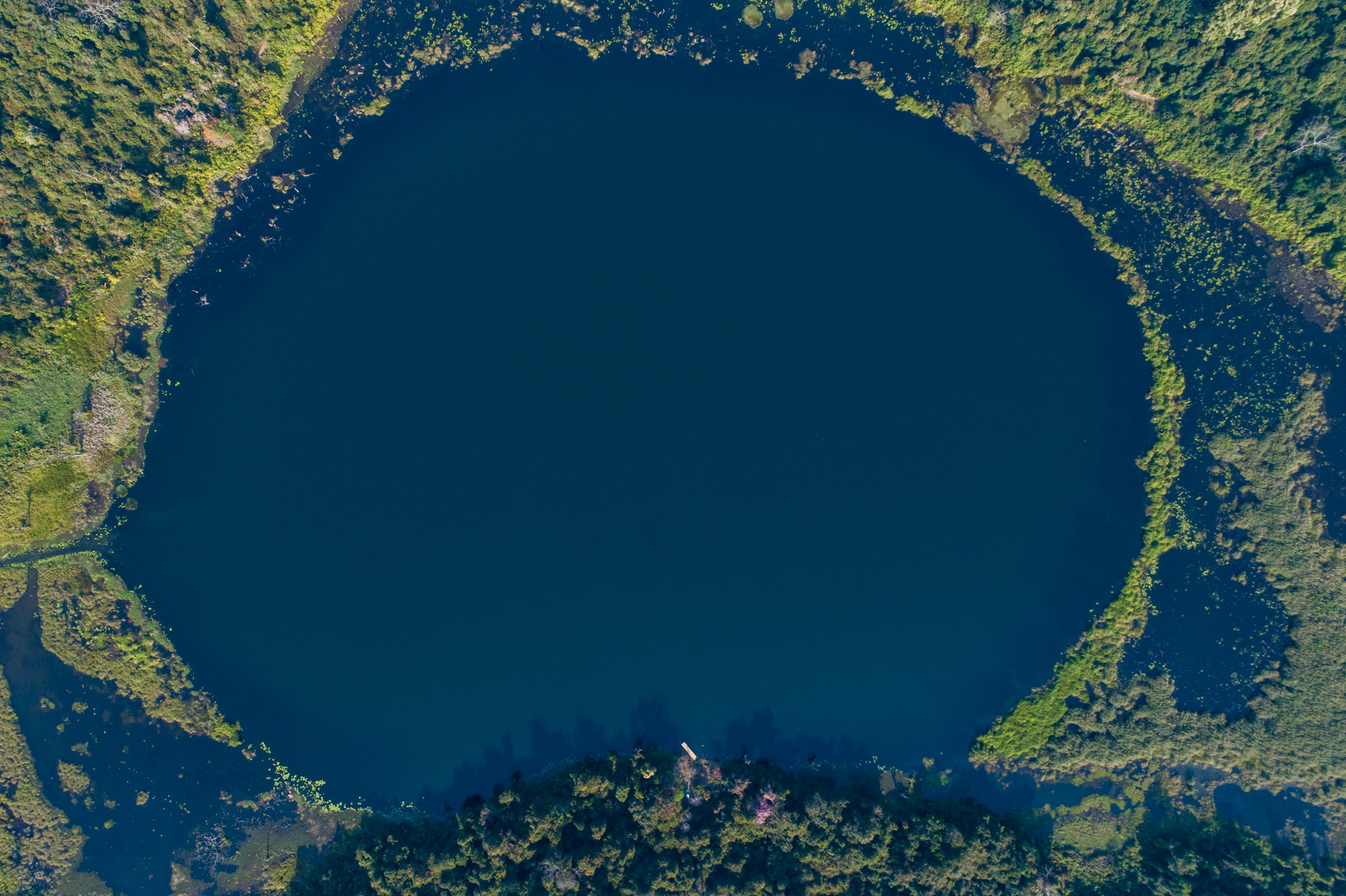
- Palak Dil

- Location within India
- Interactive map of Pala Tipo
- Location: Siaha district, Mizoram
- Coordinates: 22°20′25″N 92°56′33″E
- Type: Lentic
- Primary inflows: Two mountain streams
- Primary outflows: Pala lui
- Catchment area: 18.5 km^{2} (7.1 sq mi)
- Basin countries: India
- Max. length: 0.87 km (0.54 mi)
- Max. width: 0.7 km (0.43 mi)
- Surface area: 1.5 km^{2} (0.58 sq mi)
- Average depth: 17 m (56 ft)
- Max. depth: 27 m (89 ft)
- Surface elevation: 270 m (890 ft)
- Settlements: Phura, Tongkolong, Siaha

Ramsar Wetland
- Official name: Pala Wetland
- Designated: 31 August 2021
- Reference no.: 2484

Palak Dil or Pala Tipo (Mara language for "swallowing lake") is the largest and biggest lake in Mizoram, northeast India. It is located near Phura village in Siaha district, within the Mara Autonomous District Council in the southernmost district of Mizoram. Its geographical location falls under the Indo-Burma biodiversity hotspot, and is therefore rich in animal and plant species. The lake is a major component of the Palak Wildlife Sanctuary, and it supports the major biodiversity of the sanctuary.

Pala is derived from a mythical Mara story for the name of the lake while tipo means "lake"; it is called Palak Dil in Mizo ṭawng. The lake gives the name of the region Palak Assembly Constituency under Election Commission of India.

== Origin ==
According to oral history Palak Dil is said to be formed around 800-1200 CE. It coincided with the period of westward migration of Mara people from Burma. The origin of Palak Dil is a well known folktale among Mizo people. According to Mara legend the location area was originally a big village called Hnychao. There were about 300 families. At the center of the village was a large rock, underneath of which was a cave inhabited by a giant serpent. Villagers soon noticed that children playing around the rock frequently disappeared. At night their livestock animals were missing too. The village hunters caught the serpent using a gigantic fishing pole, and using a goat (or dog in other version) as a bait. From this point there are two versions:

1. They killed the snake and the meat was distributed to all families. A widow with two children happened to get a share of the head. When she cooked it, the eyes were blinking and rolling, staring at her. Frightened, she threw the cooking pot into the street. When she looked out, their doorstep was being flooded and fled for life with her children. The pool rose to a lake submerging the entire habitation and drowning the rest of the villagers. The lake was eventually called Pala Tipo.
2. In an alternate version, when they caught the snake they could not completely haul out its body and cut it in the middle. The bottom half fell back into the cave with massive thunder. It created an upsurge of water from the cave, submerging the whole village. This became a permanent lake and was called Pala Tipo, literally meaning a "swallowing or submerging lake".

== Hydrology ==
Palak Dil is oval in shape with a length of 870 meters, width of 700 meters, and depth of 17 to 25 meters. It is believed that a village exists below the lake, some people believes that the lake is haunted by ghosts and demons. Another Legend also believes that a British officer once dropped his sword in the middle of the lake and ordered one of his men to retrieve it, the men dived to retrieve it but came back only after 3 days explaining that he had feasted and was too drunk to return. The lake is fed by two main streams from the nearby mountains. Its drainage is through a small river called Pala Lui. This drainage area creates a stretch of valley, which remains the main agricultural area of the Mara people.

== Wildlife ==
Palak Dil is home to a number of resident and migratory animals. It is particularly rich in a variety of birds, including endemic bird species. The water is inhabited by common and unique species of fishes. Different species of prawns, snails, crabs, turtles and tortoises. More than 70 species of birds have been recorded from the lake and its shore. Among unique species are Nepal fulvetta, white-bellied yuhina, little spiderhunter, streaked spinderhunter, yellow wagtail, black-capped kingfisher, hooded pitta, spot-breasted scimitar babbler, and white-rumped munia, which are rarely seen in other parts of the region. In addition aquatic birds and wild ducks in Palak Dil are found nowhere else in Mizoram.

== Conservation ==
Palak Dil and its surrounding area covering 15 km^{2}. is declared by the Indian Ministry of Environment and Forests as a protected area under the Palak Wildlife Sanctuary. The surrounding forest is extensively exploited due to shifting cultivation. It has been designated as a protected Ramsar site since 2021.
