= Thingsen =

Thosai
- Town
- Location within Mizoram Location within India
- Coordinates: 22°28′21″N 92°58′49″E
- Country: India
- State: Mizoram
- District: Saiha
- Lok Sabha constituency: Mizoram
- Assembly constituency: Saiha

Government
  - Type: Panchayati raj
  - Body: Gram panchayat
  - MP: C. Lalrosanga (MNF)
  - MLA: K. Beichhua

Population (2011 Census)
  - Total: 328
  - Males: 174
  - Females: 154
- Time zone: UTC+5:30 (IST)
- PIN: 796 901

Thosai is a village in the Siaha district of Mizoram, India.
