= K. Hrahmo =

Indian politician

K. Hrahmo (born 8 May 1960) is an Indian politician from Mizoram. He is a member of the Mizoram Legislative Assembly representing the Bharatiya Janata Party. He won the 2023 Mizoram Legislative Assembly election from the Palak Assembly constituency which is reserved for Scheduled Tribe community, in Siaha district.

== Early life and education ==
K. Hrahmo was born in Chakhei, Siaha District, Mizoram, India. He is the son of K. Kihly and his mother is T. Pawchhai. He married B. Ngiaso in 1987 and they have a son and four daughters. He graduated from North Eastern Hill University, Shillong, Meghalaya and served as secretary of the Mara Christian Fellowship in Shillong. His hobby is fishing.

== Career ==
He served as an executive member of the Mara Autonomous District Council, Siaha for seven terms. He was elected from the Palak Assembly constituency representing the Bharatiya Janata Party in the 2023 Mizoram Legislative Assembly election. He polled 6,064 votes and defeated his nearest rival, K. T. Rokhaw of the Mizo National Front, by a margin of 1,241 votes. BJP won for the first time in Palak constituency.
