= Siatlai =

Siatlai is a village in Siaha district of Mizoram state of India.
