= Palak Assembly constituency =

Constituency of the Mizoram legislative assembly in India

Coordinates: 22.3335°N 92.9235°E

Palak
- Constituency No. 40 for the Mizoram Legislative Assembly
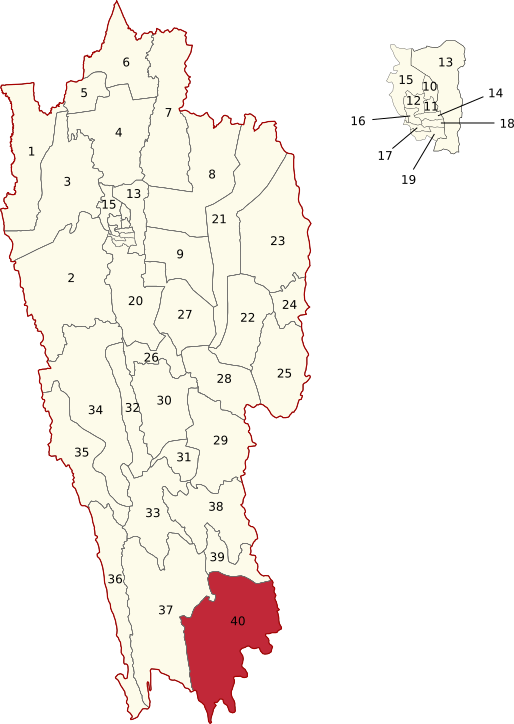

Constituency details
- Country: India
- Region: Northeast India
- State: Mizoram
- District: Saiha
- Lok Sabha constituency: Mizoram
- Established: 2008
- Total electors: 20,435
- Reservation: ST

Member of Legislative Assembly
- 9th Mizoram Legislative Assembly
- Incumbent Pushpa K. Hrahmo
- Party: BJP
- Elected year: 2023

Palak is one of the 40 Legislative Assembly constituencies of Mizoram state in India.

It is one of two constituencies in Siaha district and is reserved for candidates belonging to the Scheduled Tribes. It comes under the sole Lok Sabha constituency of the state, Mizoram.

== Members of the Legislative Assembly ==
Year	Member	Party
2008	P. P. Thawla	Maraland Democratic Front
2013	Hiphei	Indian National Congress
2018	M. Chakhu	Mizo National Front
2023	K. Hrahmo	Bharatiya Janata Party

== Election results ==
=== 2008 ===
2008 Mizoram Legislative Assembly election : Palak
Party	Candidate	Votes	%	±%
Maraland Democratic Front	P. P. Thawla	4,206	33.37	
INC	T. T. Vakhu	4,122	32.71	
Independent	Laicho Notlia	2,167	17.19	
Independent	K. T. Rokhaw	1,877	14.89	
MPC	N. Beikhai	185	1.47	
LJP	Lalthlahlova	46	0.36	
Margin of victory		84	0.67	
Total valid votes		12,603		
Rejected ballots		2		
Turnout		12,605	82.54	
Registered electors		15,271		
Maraland Democratic Front win (new seat)				

=== 2013 ===
2013 Mizoram Legislative Assembly election : Palak
Party	Candidate	Votes	%	±%
INC	Hiphei	7,256	56.86	
Maraland Democratic Front	P. P. Thawla	5,433	42.58	
NOTA	None of the Above	72	0.56	
Margin of victory		1,823	14.37	
Total valid votes		12,761		
Rejected ballots		4		
Turnout		12,765	82.53	
Registered electors		15,467		
INC gain from Maraland Democratic Front		Swing		

=== 2018 ===
2018 Mizoram Legislative Assembly election : Palak
Party	Candidate	Votes	%	±%
MNF	M. Chakhu	5,492	37.44	
BJP	Hiphei	4,648	31.68	
INC	K. T. Rokhaw	4,431	30.20	
Independent	S. Sathlu	59	0.40	
NOTA	None of the Above	40	0.27	
Margin of victory		844	5.77	
Total valid votes		14,670		
Rejected ballots		7		
Turnout		14,677	81.34	
Registered electors		18,043		
MNF gain from INC		Swing		

=== 2023 ===
2023 Mizoram Legislative Assembly election: Palak
Party	Candidate	Votes	%	±%
BJP	K. Hrahmo	6,064	37.8	▲6.12
MNF	K.T. Rokhaw	4,823	30.06	▼7.38
INC	I. P. Junior	3,729	23.24	▼6.96
ZPM	K. Robinson	1,378	8.59	New
NOTA	None of the Above	50	0.31	▲0.04
Majority		1,241	7.44	▲1.68
Turnout		16,044	79.07	▼2.24
BJP gain from MNF		Swing		

== See also ==
- List of constituencies of the Mizoram Legislative Assembly
