= Saiha Assembly constituency =

Constituency of the Mizoram legislative assembly in India

Coordinates: 22.472272°N 92.996470°E

Saiha
- Constituency No. 39 for the Mizoram Legislative Assembly
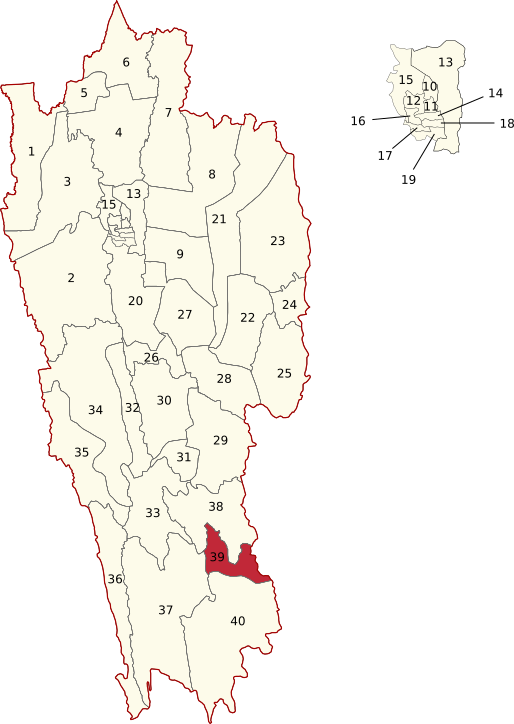

Constituency details
- Country: India
- Region: Northeast India
- State: Mizoram
- District: Saiha
- Lok Sabha constituency: Mizoram
- Established: 2008
- Total electors: 18,265
- Reservation: ST

Member of Legislative Assembly
- 9th Mizoram Legislative Assembly
- Incumbent Dr. K. Beichhua
- Party: Bharatiya Janata Party
- Elected year: 2023

Saiha is one of the 40 Legislative Assembly constituencies of Mizoram state in India.

It is part of Siaha district and is reserved for candidates belonging to the Scheduled Tribes.

== Members of the Legislative Assembly ==
| Year | Name | Party |
|---|---|---|
| 1972 | Sapliana Vandir | Independent |
| 1978 | R. T. Zachono | Independent |
| 1979 | Sapliana Vandir | Janata Party |
| 1984 | F. Lalramliana | Indian National Congress |
| 1987 | S. Hiato | Indian National Congress |
| 1989 | S. Hiato | Indian National Congress |
| 1993 | Zakhu Hlychho | Mizo National Front |
| 1998 | Zakhu Hlychho | Indian National Congress |
| 2003 | S. Hiato | Indian National Congress |
| 2008 | S. Hiato | Indian National Congress |
| 2013 | K. Beichhua | Mizo National Front |
| 2018 | K. Beichhua | Mizo National Front |
| 2023 | K. Beichhua | Bharatiya Janata Party |

== Election results ==
=== 2023 ===
2023 Mizoram Legislative Assembly election: Saiha
| Party | Candidate | Votes | % | ±% |
|---|---|---|---|---|
| BJP | Dr. K. Beichhua | 6,740 | 35.83 | ▲21.61 |
| MNF | H.C. Lalmalsawma Zasai | 6,124 | 32.56 | ▼17.26 |
| INC | N. Chakhai | 3,607 | 19.18 | ▼15.48 |
| ZPM | K. H. Beithie | 2,219 | 11.8 | New |
| Independent | A. Phirthianga | 73 | 0.39 | New |
| NOTA | None of the Above | 47 | 0.25 | Steady |
| Majority | | 616 | 3.27 | ▼11.89 |
| Turnout | | 18,810 | 75.32 | ▼2.28 |
| BJP gain from MNF | | Swing | ▲21.61 | |

=== 2018 ===
2018 Mizoram Legislative Assembly election: Saiha
| Party | Candidate | Votes | % | ±% |
|---|---|---|---|---|
| MNF | Dr. K. Beichhua | 8,109 | 49.94 | |
| INC | S. Hiato | 5,641 | 34.74 | |
| BJP | S. Vadyu | 2,315 | 14.26 | |
| Independent | F. Thangchhuaha | 171 | 1.05 | |
| NOTA | None of the Above | 41 | | |
| Majority | | 2,468 | 15.2 | |
| Turnout | | 16,236 | 79.9 | |
| MNF hold | | Swing | | |

=== 2013 ===
2013 Mizoram Legislative Assembly election: Saiha
| Party | Candidate | Votes | % | ±% |
|---|---|---|---|---|
| MNF | Dr. K. Beichhua | 7,324 | 49.82 | |
| INC | S. Hiato | 7,102 | 48.31 | |
| ZNP | F. Lalhmachhuana | 274 | 1.86 | |
| Majority | | 222 | 1.5 | |
| Turnout | | 14,700 | 80.5 | |
| MNF gain from INC | | Swing | | |

=== 2008 ===
2008 Mizoram Legislative Assembly election: Saiha
| Party | Candidate | Votes | % | ±% |
|---|---|---|---|---|
| INC | S. Hiato | 4,772 | 36.94 | |
| MNF | H.C. Lalmalsawma Zasai | 4,669 | 36.15 | |
| Independent | Dr. K. Beichhua | 3,010 | 23.30 | |
| ZNP | F. Lalhmachhuana | 415 | 3.21 | |
| LJP | M. C. Lalbuaia | 51 | 0.39 | |
| Majority | | 103 | 0.8 | |
| Turnout | | 12,917 | 78.8 | |
| INC hold | | Swing | | |

=== 2003 ===
2003 Mizoram Legislative Assembly election: Saiha
| Party | Candidate | Votes | % | ±% |
|---|---|---|---|---|
| INC | S. Hiato | 4,771 | 38.75 | |
| Maraland Democratic Front | S. Vadyu | 4,430 | 35.98 | |
| MNF | Lalringa | 2,986 | 24.25 | |
| JD(U) | M. C. Lalbuaia | 125 | 1.02 | |
| Majority | | 341 | 2.8 | |
| Turnout | | 12,314 | 74.5 | |
| INC hold | | Swing | | |

== See also ==
- Siaha district
- List of constituencies of the Mizoram Legislative Assembly
