= Mount Mawma =

Mountain in India

Coordinates: 22°17′51″N 93°07′56″E

Mount Mawma (also known as Maumae Tlah or Mount Maumae) is a mountain in the Mizoram state of north-east India and the highest mountain within Mara Autonomous District Council. It is north to the nearest town of Chakhei. Mount Mawma's peak lays 6725 feet (2050 metres) above sea level. In order to climb it, one needs special permission from the Indian Mountaineering Federation.
