= Mara Autonomous District Council =

Autonomous district council in Mizoram, India

Coordinates: 22.48°N 92.97°E

Type
- Type: Autonomous District Council

Leadership
- Chief Executive Member: M. Laikaw, BJP since 22 December 2022

Structure
- Seats: 28 Councillors (25 elected + 3 nominated)
- Political groups: Government (15); NDA (15): BJP (12); IND (3); Opposition (10): MNF (7); INC (3); Nominated (3): NOM (3)

Elections
- Voting system: 25 plurality voting
- Voting system: 3 nominated
- Last election: May 2022
- Next election: 2027

Meeting place
- Siaha, Mizoram

Website
- https://madc.mizoram.gov.in/

North Eastern autonomous divisions

Mara Autonomous District Council (MADC) is one of the three Autonomous District Councils within Mizoram state of India. It covers Siaha and Tipa subdivisions of Siaha district. Primarily, an autonomous administrative government meant for the Mara people living in the state. It is situated at the southern tip of Mizoram state bordering Myanmar. Its autonomy was established and carved out from the erstwhile Pawi-Lakher Regional Council on 29 May 1971, separated the next year as Lakher Autonomous District Council, and renamed to its current name in 1988. It covers 1445 square kilometres.

The government has jurisdiction over land administration, administration of justice, limited legislative powers, and a few other local powers.

== History ==
In 1954 the Central and Assam governments established a regional council, the Pawi Lakher Regional Council (PLRC), for the Lakhers (aka Mara) and the Pawis (aka Lai), in which a large number of Chakmas also resided. However, the PLRC could not function properly right from its inception as there was no common communication language among the three tribal communities to understand each other. The first meeting was held without understanding each other's language where Mizo was used as the official language but Chakmas and Maras could hardly understand anything. Consequently, in 1958 the Maras boycotted PLRC meetings. In 1972, to resolve the issue the PLRC was divided into three regional councils and upgraded to 3 district councils, one each for Maras, Lais and Chakmas.

== Structure ==
=== Departments ===
Mara Autonomous District Council looks after many departments in her area including fisheries, schools (up to Middle school) and education, judiciary, land and revenue, forestry, Public Health Engineering (PHE), etc.

=== Members ===
Constituencies under Mara Autonomous District Council and their members as of 2022 election:

| # | Constituency | Councillor | Party | Remarks |
|---|---|---|---|---|
| 1 | Tôkalô | M. Laikaw | BJP | Chief Executive Member |
| 2 | Phura | H. Malvina | INC | |
| 3 | Vahia | K. Chhuabei | BJP | |
| 4 | Laki | T. Seido | BJP | |
| 5 | Zyhno | L. Prisila | BJP | |
| 6 | Chapi | C. Chehnei | BJP | |
| 7 | Chakhei | K. Hrahmo | BJP | Elected as MLA in 2023 election |
| 7 | Chakhei | Albert TT. Sachu | BJP | Elected in 2024 by-election |
| 8 | Siata | M. Chiadung | BJP | |
| 9 | Tisi | Tiahlei Syuhlô | BJP | |
| 10 | Tipa - I | S. Lalremthanga | IND | Resigned from MNF |
| 11 | Tipa - II | Beihu Nohro | BJP | |
| 12 | Laty | Beirahmo Syhly | BJP | |
| 13 | Saikao | Beihruakhai | MNF | |
| 14 | Amôbyuh | N. Zakhai | BJP | |
| 15 | Amôtlâh | HC. Lalmalsawma Zasai | MNF | |
| 16 | Noh-aotlâh | Lalrosanga | IND | Resigned from MNF |
| 17 | Chhaolô | MH. Tiabi | BJP | |
| 18 | Siaha North-I | Nahlo Solo | MNF | |
| 19 | Siaha North-II | M. Manasia | MNF | |
| 20 | Siaha South-I | Siaha South-I | IND | Resigned from MNF |
| 21 | Siaha South-II | N. Viakhu | MNF | |
| 22 | Siaha East-I | H. Hrangchuanga | INC | |
| 22 | Siaha East-I | Nelson Khenglawt | MNF | Elected in 2023 by-election |
| 23 | Siaha East - II | HC. Biakcheuva | MNF | |
| 24 | Siaha West-I | TA. James Riatha | INC | |
| 25 | Siaha West-II | ST. Vanmalsawmliana | INC | |
| 26 | Nominated | TBD | NOM | |
| 27 | Nominated | TBD | NOM | |
| 28 | Nominated | TBD | NOM | |

== Election ==
In December 2005, Independent Member of the District Council, Shri. N. Viakhu formally joined Mizo National Front (MNF) to lead a new MADC government formed by MNF with a simple majority. He was severely criticized for his nomination of four MNF workers to MDC nominated seats despite being the CEM of the Cong-MNF coalition government. The nomination allows MNF to enjoy a simple majority (15 - 11); otherwise Cong-MDF combine and MNF were tied at 11 elected members each.

In 2009 the council was led by an independent member of the District Council, Shri. N. Viakhu formed a coalition government with Maraland Democratic Front and Indian National Congress in the 2005 election.

The latest election of MADC had been held in 2022, with the Bharatiya Janata Party winning 12 seats, the Mizoram National Front winning 9, and the Indian National Congress winning 4.

== Tourist spots ==
Tourist spots within MADC include

- Siaha - the district headquarters,
- Mt. Mawma, the highest mountain in MADC area and the 3rd highest mountain(6725 ft) in Mizoram state. About 3 km from Chakhei town, 76 km approx. from Siaha.
- Pala Lake, the biggest lake in the state,
- River Kaladan, the biggest river in Mizoram, that serves as border between MADC and Lai Autonomous District Council. Kaladan river fish are famous for their taste.
- Phura - the only town on plain. The barn of Maraland.
- Tokalo (Pala) Wildlife Sanctuary, some 80 km Southwest of Siaha.
- Tipa or Tuipang - the second largest and vibrant town in the central part of MADC or Maraland.
- Kolodyne Bridge Kaochao - The longest bridge in Mizoram.
- Zyhno-the third largest town and the place where the Mara village is located.

== See also ==
- Chakma Autonomous District Council
- Lai Autonomous District Council
- North Eastern Council
- Hill tribes of Northeast India
