= K. Beichhua =

Indian politician and surgeon

Dr. K. Beichhua

President of the Mizoram Bharatiya Janata Party
- Incumbent
- Assumed office 30 June 2025
- President: JP Nadda; Nitin Nabin
- Preceded by: Vanhlalmuaka

Member of the Mizoram Legislative Assembly
- Incumbent
- Assumed office 2013
- Preceded by: S. Hiato
- Constituency: Saiha

Personal details
- Born: 19 December 1966 (age 59) Thingsen, Mizoram, India
- Party: Bharatiya Janata Party (2023-present)
- Other political affiliations: Mizo National Front (2013-2023); Independent (2008-13)
- Children: 4
- Parent: K. Thachho (father)
- Education: Regional Medical College
- Occupation: Politician & MBBS

Dr. K. Beichhua is an Indian politician and retired surgeon. He is a member of the Bharatiya Janata Party, and is the current president of the Mizoram state unit of the BJP. He is serving as a member of Mizoram Legislative Assembly as a member of the Bharatiya Janata Party. He is a former member of the Mizo National Front (MNF) as a member of the Mizoram Legislative Assembly for Saiha before resigning to join the BJP. He previously served in the Government of Mizoram as Minister for Social Welfare, Excise & Narcotics & Sericulture department. He resigned as MLA and later joined the BJP after getting expelled from the MNF for anti-party activities. He was then elected in 2023 from Saiha on thr BJP ticket.

== Early life ==
Beichhua was born on 19 December 1966 in the village of Thingsen in the Siaha district of Mizoram. His father was K. Thachho. Beichhua graduated with an MBBS from the Regional Medical College in Imphal, Manipur in 1991. He then began working as a general practitioner. Beichhua has stated that he has performed hundreds of operations in his career.

== Political career ==
Beichhua contested the 2008 state elections from the Saiha constituency as an independent candidate. He placed third in the election with 23.30% of the vote, behind the Indian National Congress and MNF candidates. He joined the MNF in 2013 and successfully contested the 2013 elections from Saiha. Beichhua received 49.62% of the votes, defeating the incumbent State Industries and Tourism Minister S. Hiato by a margin of 222 votes. After winning the election, Beichhua quit his medical practice, performing his last surgery in December 2013. Beichhua was reelected from the Saiha constituency in the 2018 elections. He was re-elected in 2023 elections as a BJP candidate.

Beichhua performed an emergency surgery on a female constituent at the Saiha Civil Hospital on 22 February 2017. Beichhua chose to perform the surgery himself after he was informed that the woman had developed complications, and the hospital's only surgeon was away attending a training programme in Imphal. Beichhua stated, "I was informed that a 35-year old woman was having severe abdominal pain and needed to be operated immediately. The woman's stomach had a large perforation and if the operation had not been performed, she may have died."

He was appointed as the president of the BJP in Mizoram on 30 June 2025.

== Personal life ==
Beichhua is married to Zochhuanawmin, who is also a doctor.
