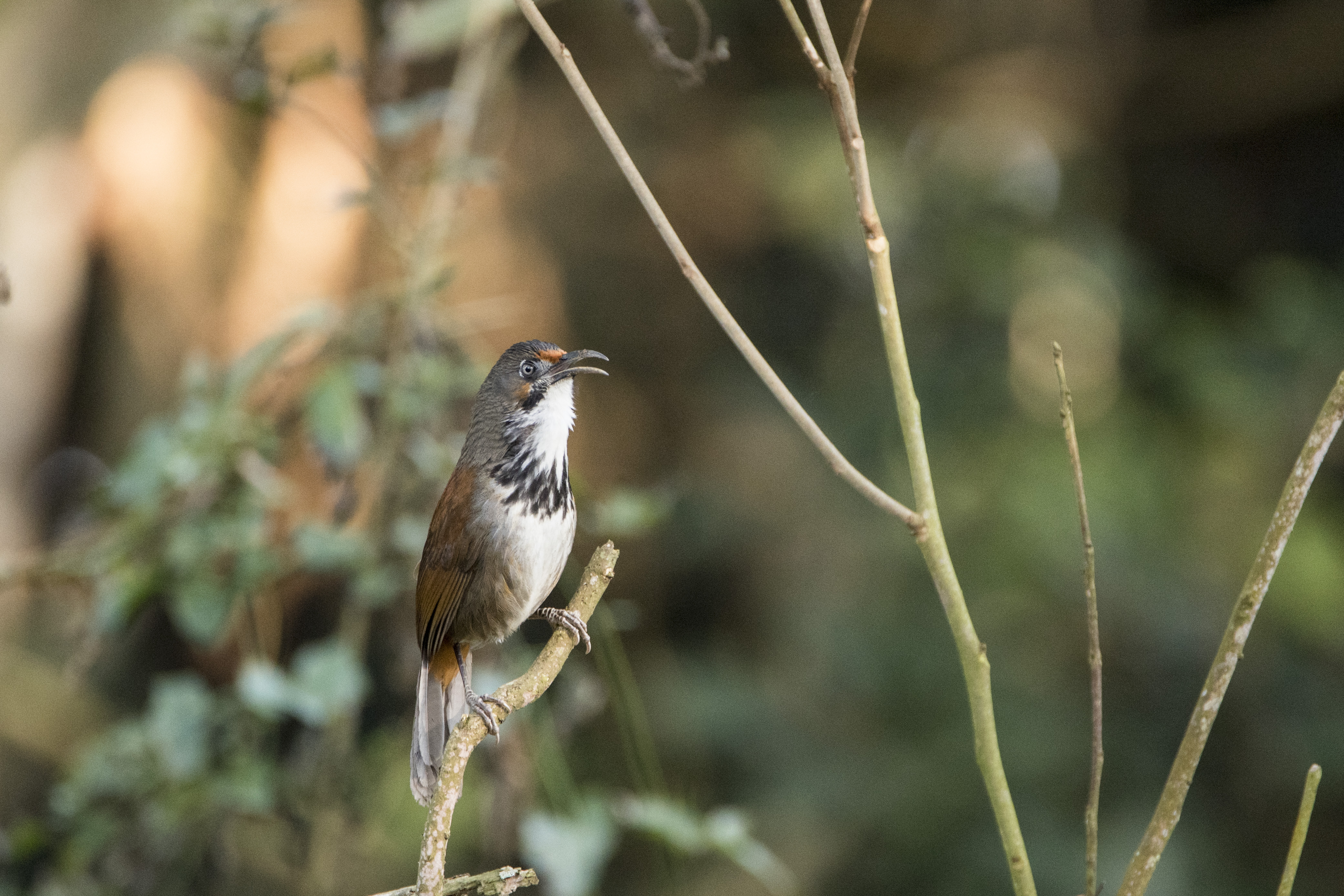
- In Lugu, Nantou, Taiwan

Conservation status
- Least Concern (IUCN 3.1)

Scientific classification
- Kingdom: Animalia
- Phylum: Chordata
- Class: Aves
- Order: Passeriformes
- Family: Timaliidae
- Genus: Erythrogenys
- Species: E. erythrocnemis

Binomial name
- Erythrogenys erythrocnemis (Gould, 1863)

= Black-necklaced scimitar babbler =

Species of bird

The black-necklaced scimitar babbler (Erythrogenys erythrocnemis) is a species of bird in the family Timaliidae.

It is found in Taiwan. Its natural habitats are subtropical or tropical moist lowland forest and subtropical or tropical moist montane forest.
