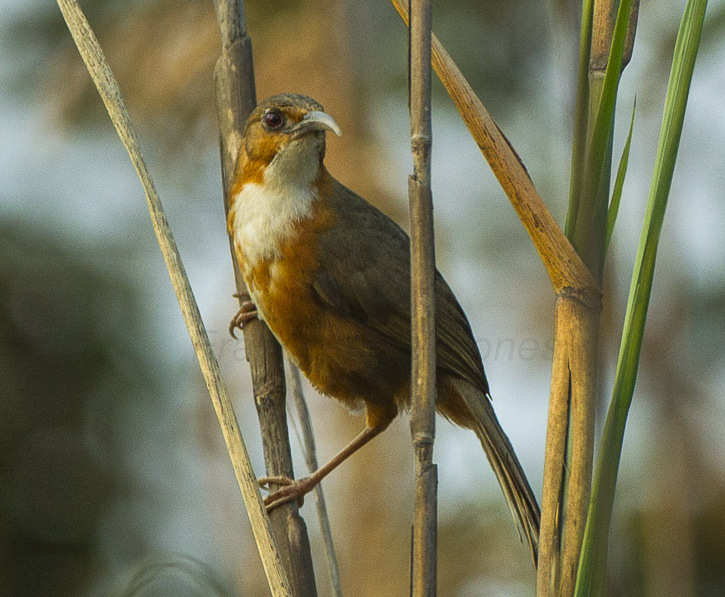
- E. i. celata seen in Thailand

Scientific classification
- Domain: Eukaryota
- Kingdom: Animalia
- Phylum: Chordata
- Class: Aves
- Order: Passeriformes
- Family: Timaliidae
- Genus: Erythrogenys
- Species: E. imberbis

Binomial name
- Erythrogenys imberbis (Salvadori, 1889)

= Red-eyed scimitar babbler =

Species of bird

The red-eyed scimitar babbler (Erythrogenys imberbis), is a species of passerine bird in the babbler family Timaliidae. It is found in eastern Myanmar and northwestern Thailand. It was formerly considered a subspecies of the rusty-cheeked scimitar babbler until it was split in 2024 by the IOC and Clements checklist.

== Taxonomy ==
The red-eyed scimitar babbler was first described by Italian zoologist Tommaso Salvadori in 1889 from a specimen collected by Leonardo Fea near the mountain of Yado Taung, 50 km (31 mi) northeast of Leiktho in Myanmar. Salvadori placed the specimen in the genus Pomatorhinus and coined the binomial name Pomatorhinus imberbis where the specific epithet is Latin meaning "beardless". It was later moved the genus Erythrogenys and treated as a subspecies of the rusty-cheeked scimitar babbler under the name E. e. imberbis. Following a 2023 study, it was classified as a distinct species based on morphological and vocalization differences.

There are currently two recognized subspecies:

- E. i. imberbis (Salvadori, 1889) - Kayah State, Myanmar
- E. i. celata (Deignan, 1941) - Shan State, Myanmar and northwest Thailand

== Description ==
The red-eyed babbler can be differentiated from its relatives by its red iris, dark bill, brown-orange ear coverts, grey lore and the lack of breast streaking on most individuals.
