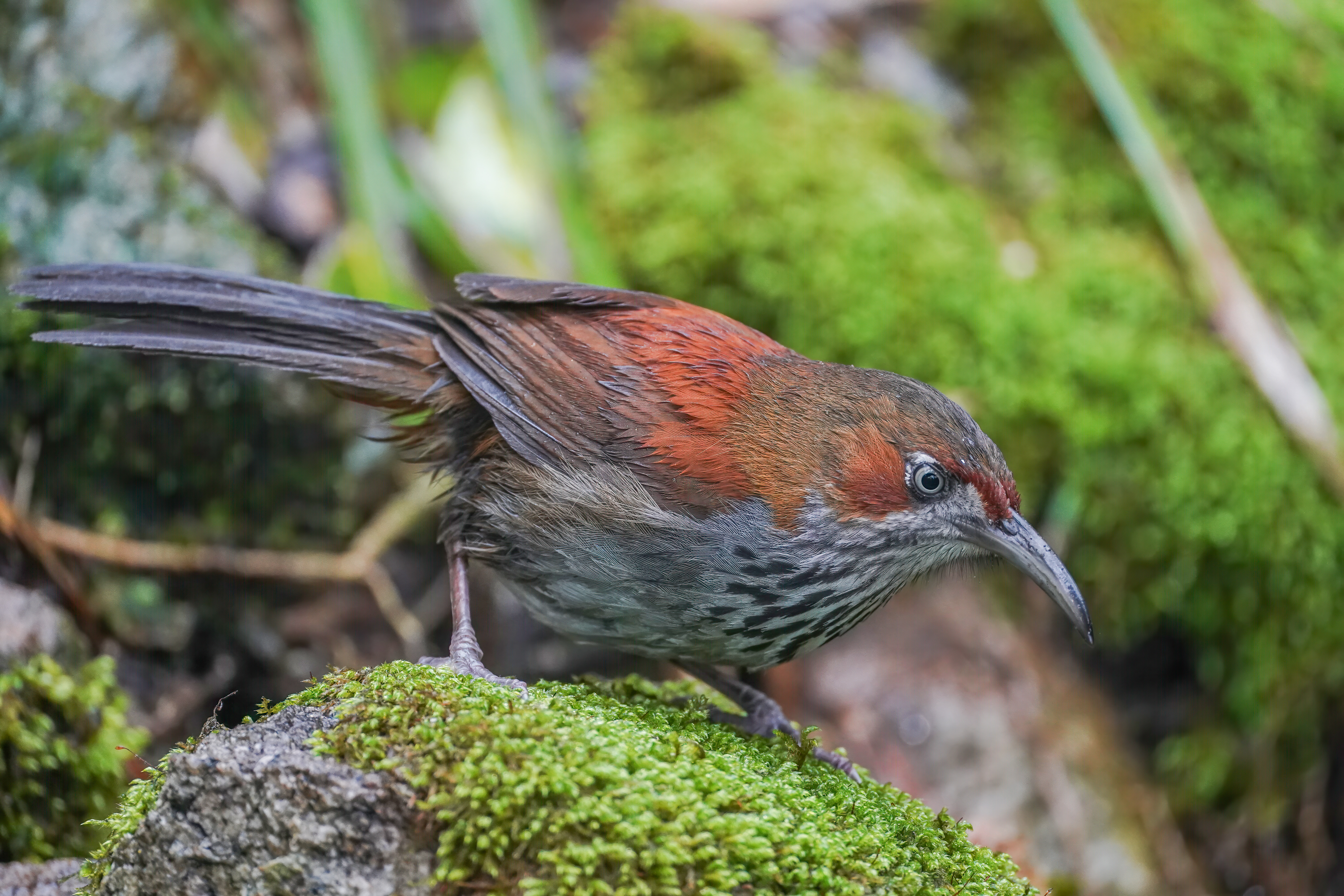

Conservation status
- Least Concern (IUCN 3.1)

Scientific classification
- Kingdom: Animalia
- Phylum: Chordata
- Class: Aves
- Order: Passeriformes
- Family: Timaliidae
- Genus: Erythrogenys
- Species: E. swinhoei

Binomial name
- Erythrogenys swinhoei (David, A, 1874)

= Grey-sided scimitar babbler =

Species of bird

The grey-sided scimitar babbler (Erythrogenys swinhoei) is a species of bird in the family Timaliidae. It is found in southern China. Its natural habitats are subtropical or tropical moist lowland forest and subtropical or tropical moist montane forest.
