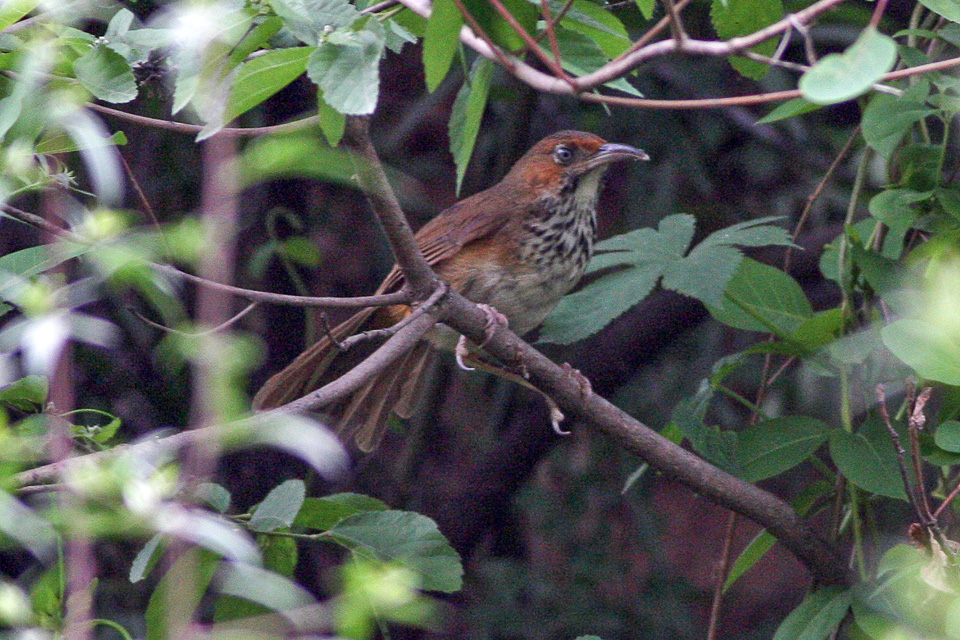

Conservation status
- Least Concern (IUCN 3.1)

Scientific classification
- Kingdom: Animalia
- Phylum: Chordata
- Class: Aves
- Order: Passeriformes
- Family: Timaliidae
- Genus: Erythrogenys
- Species: E. gravivox

Binomial name
- Erythrogenys gravivox (David, A, 1873)

= Black-streaked scimitar babbler =

Species of bird

The black-streaked scimitar babbler (Erythrogenys gravivox) is a species of bird in the family Timaliidae. It is found in China, Laos, Myanmar and Vietnam, where its natural habitats are subtropical or tropical moist lowland forest and subtropical or tropical moist montane forest.
