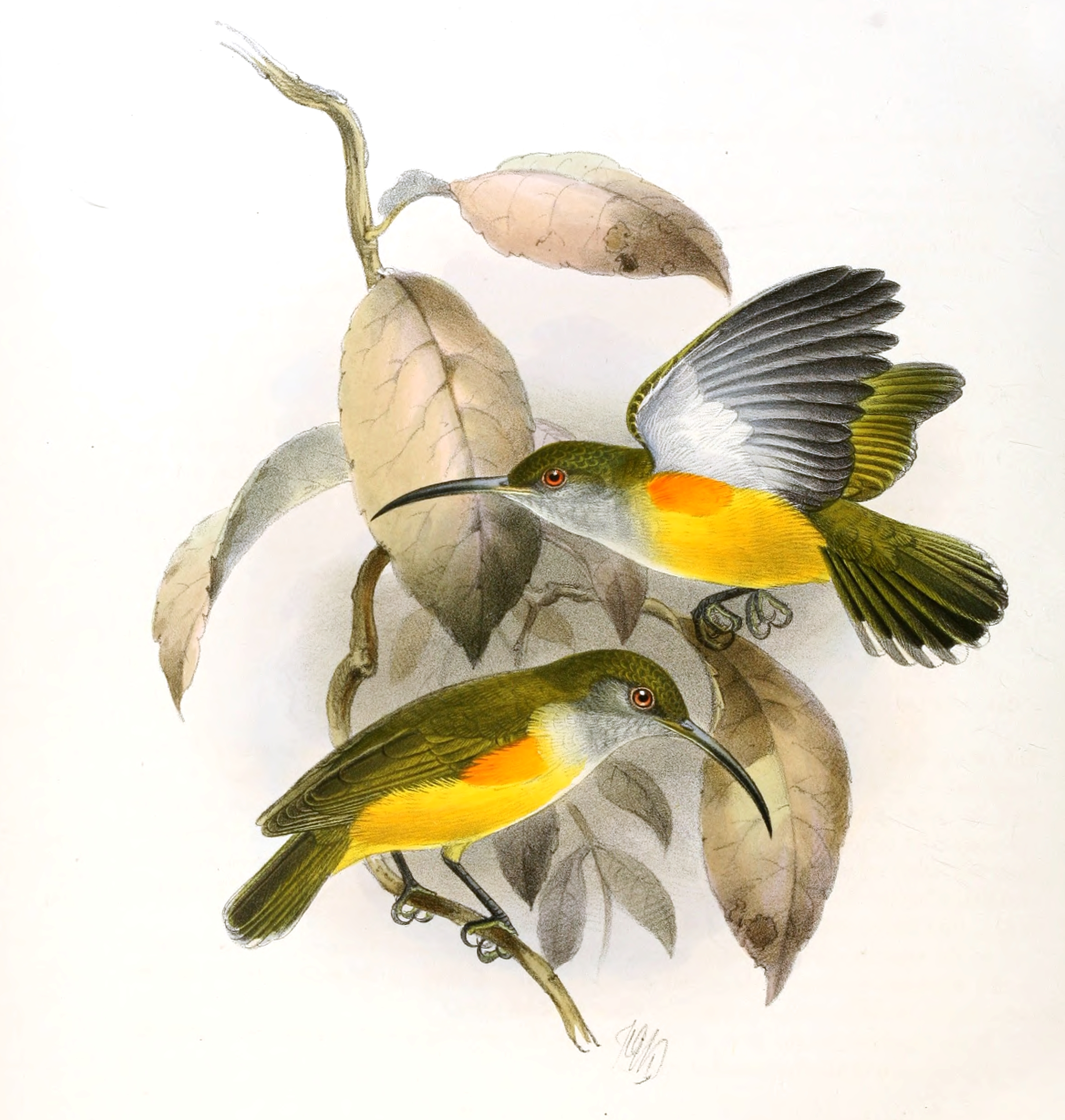

Conservation status
- Least Concern (IUCN 3.1)

Scientific classification
- Kingdom: Animalia
- Phylum: Chordata
- Class: Aves
- Order: Passeriformes
- Family: Nectariniidae
- Genus: Arachnothera
- Species: A. flammifera

Binomial name
- Arachnothera flammifera Tweeddale, 1878

= Orange-tufted spiderhunter =

Species of bird

The orange-tufted spiderhunter (Arachnothera flammifera) is a species of bird in the family Nectariniidae. It is endemic to the Philippines found only on Mindanao and Eastern Visayas. It was originally considered a subspecies of the little spiderhunter.

This species was Peter Kaestner's 10,000th species of bird seen.

== Description and taxonomy ==
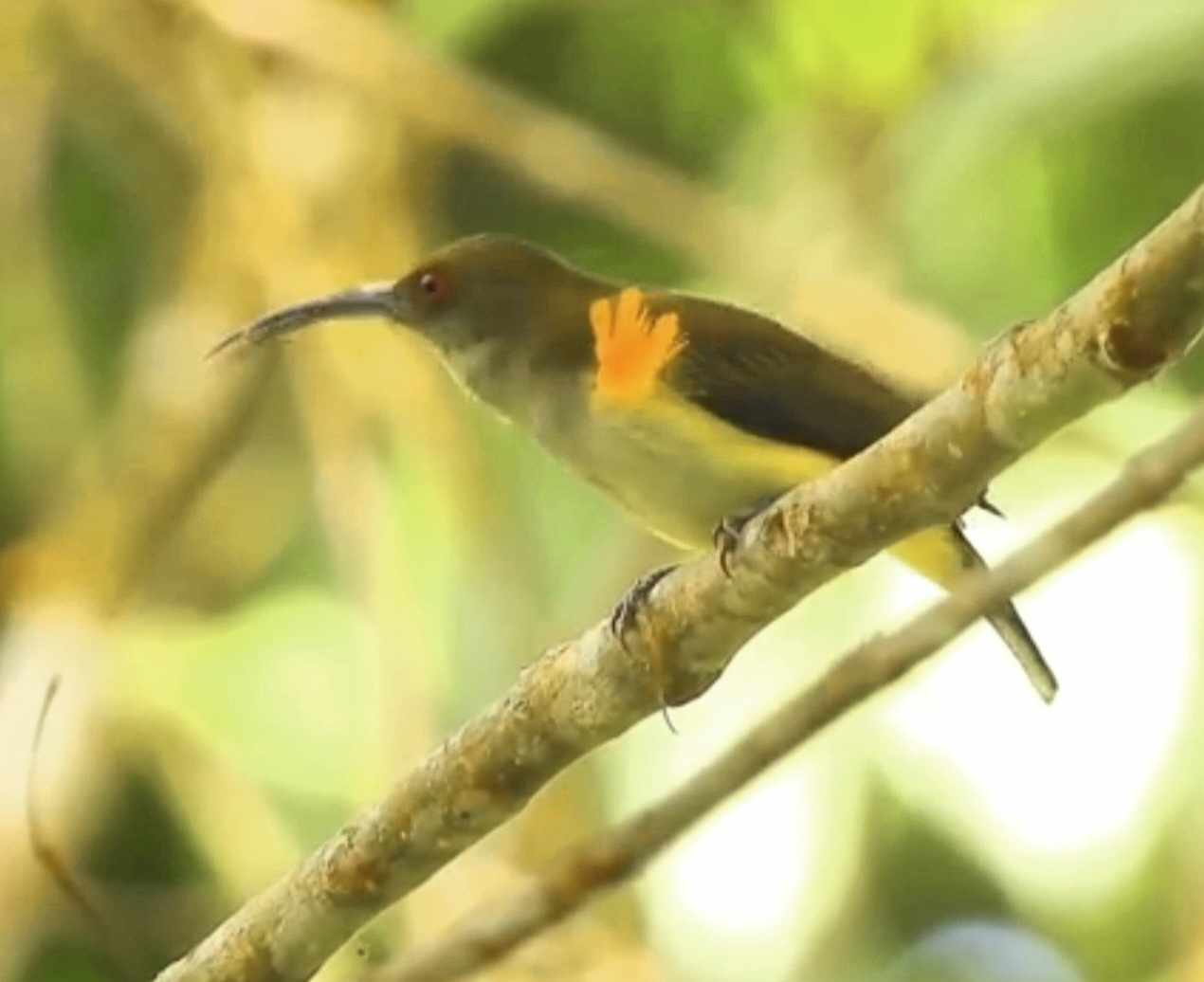
An orange-tufted spiderhunter displaying its tufts

This species was formerly conspecific with the little spiderhunter and pale spiderhunter. This species is differentiated by its pale gray throat and belly, its eponymous flame orange tufts and its higher pitched song.

=== Subspecies ===
Two subspecies are recognized:

- A. f. flammifera – Found on Mindanao (and its surrounding small islands) Bohol, Leyte. Bohol. Biliran and Samar
- A. f. randi –Found on Basilan; has a longer bill

== Ecology and behavior ==
This species' diet has not yet been comprehensively studied but it is assumed to have a similar diet as the formerly conspecific little spiderhunter which feeds on nectar, insects and spiders.Has been known to show nectar robbing. Typically forages alone or in pairs in the lower levels of vegetation.

Not much is known about its breeding habits but birds collected in breeding condition with enlarged gonads collected in April and May.

== Habitat and conservation status ==
It is found in tropical moist lowland forest up to 1,000 meters (3,300 ft) above sea level.

IUCN has assessed this bird as least-concern species. This species is generally uncommon but apparently shows a tolerance for degraded habitat and plantations.

Occurs in a few protected areas like Pasonanca Natural Park, Mount Apo and Mount Kitanglad on Mindanao, Rajah Sikatuna Protected Landscape in Bohol and Samar Island Natural Park but actual protection and enforcement from illegal logging and hunting are lax.
