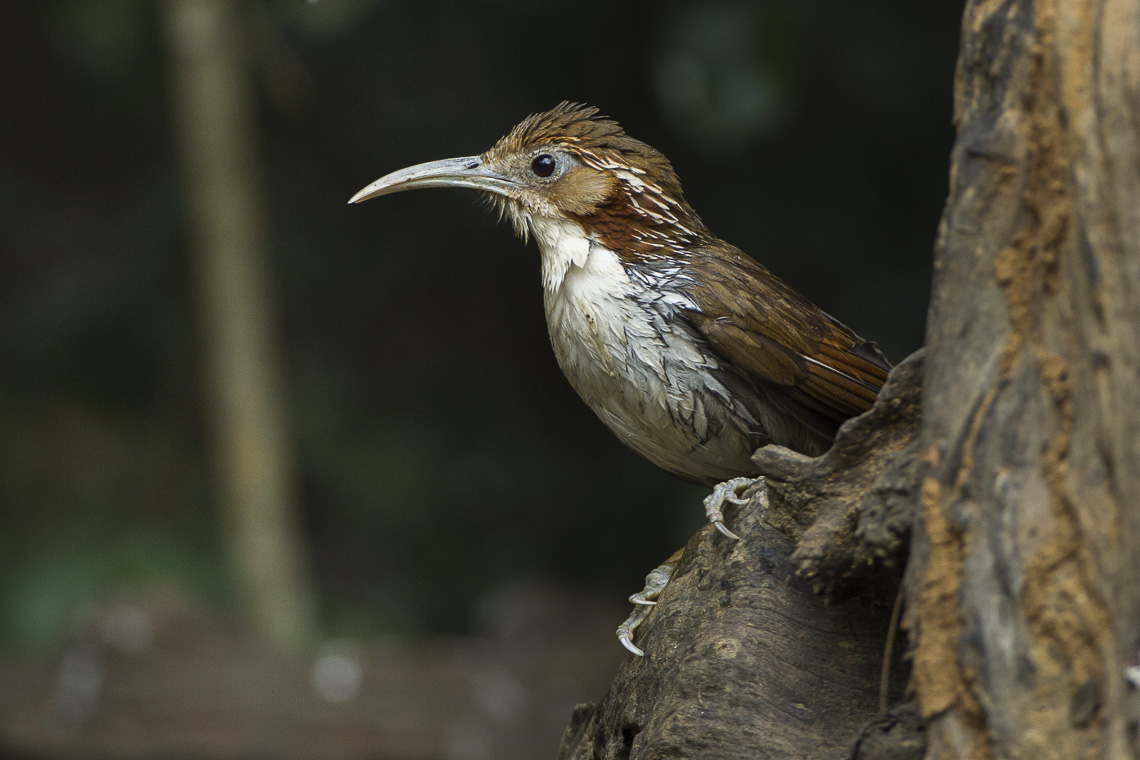

Conservation status
- Least Concern (IUCN 3.1)

Scientific classification
- Kingdom: Animalia
- Phylum: Chordata
- Class: Aves
- Order: Passeriformes
- Family: Timaliidae
- Genus: Erythrogenys
- Species: E. hypoleucos

Binomial name
- Erythrogenys hypoleucos (Blyth, 1844)

= Large scimitar babbler =

Species of bird

The large scimitar babbler (Erythrogenys hypoleucos) is a species of bird in the family Timaliidae. It is found in Bangladesh, Cambodia, China, India, Laos, Malaysia, Myanmar, Thailand, and Vietnam. Its natural habitats are subtropical or tropical moist lowland forest and subtropical or tropical moist montane forest.
