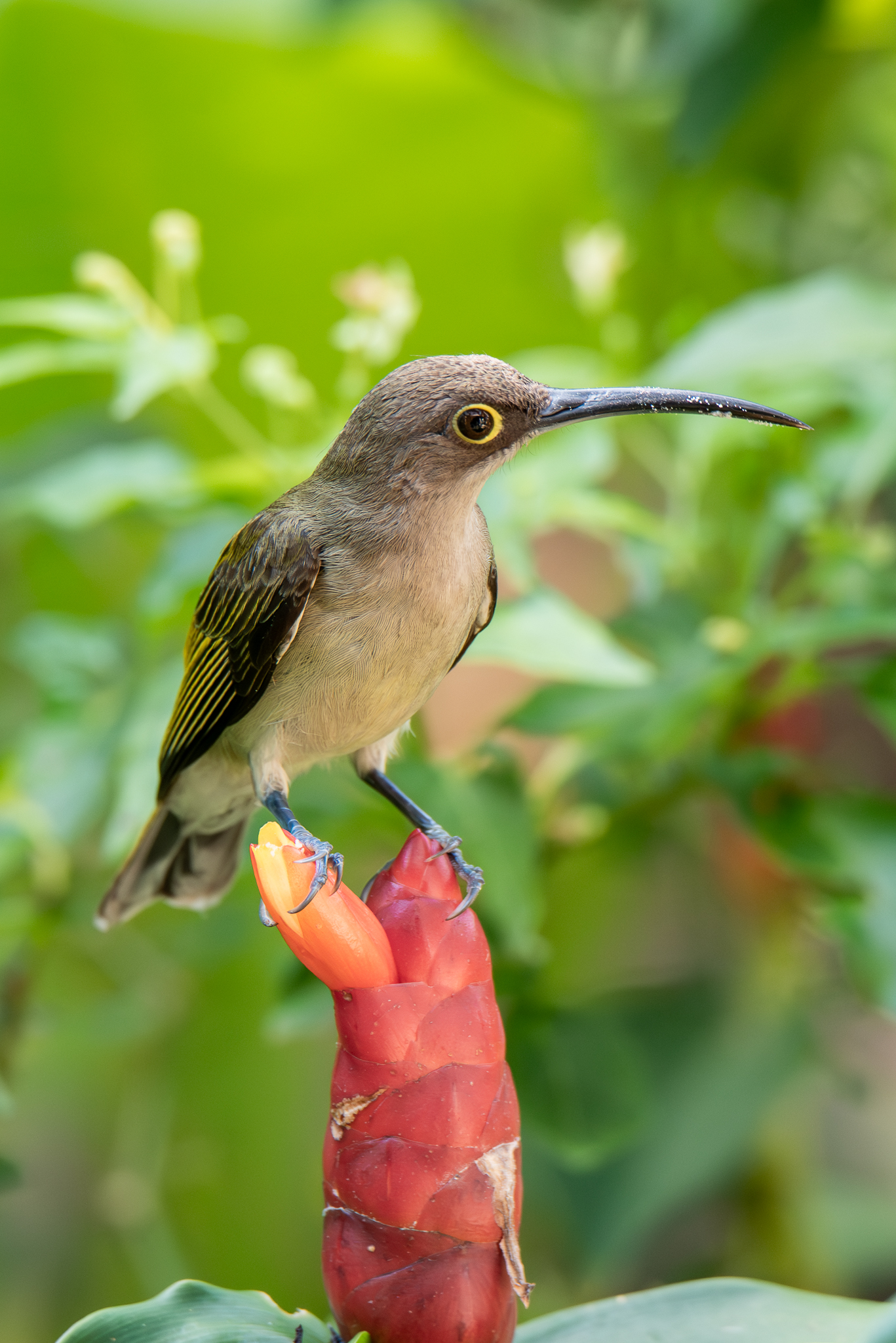

Conservation status
- Least Concern (IUCN 3.1)

Scientific classification
- Kingdom: Animalia
- Phylum: Chordata
- Class: Aves
- Order: Passeriformes
- Family: Nectariniidae
- Genus: Arachnothera
- Species: A. dilutior

Binomial name
- Arachnothera dilutior Sharpe, 1876

= Pale spiderhunter =

Species of bird

The pale spiderhunter (Arachnothera dilutior) is a species of bird in the family Nectariniidae. It is endemic to the island of Palawan in the Philippines. Along with the orange-tufted spiderhunter, it was originally considered a subspecies of the little spiderhunter. It is predominantly grayish in color, with olive-green wings, a pale yellow belly and a bold yellow eyering.

== Description and taxonomy ==
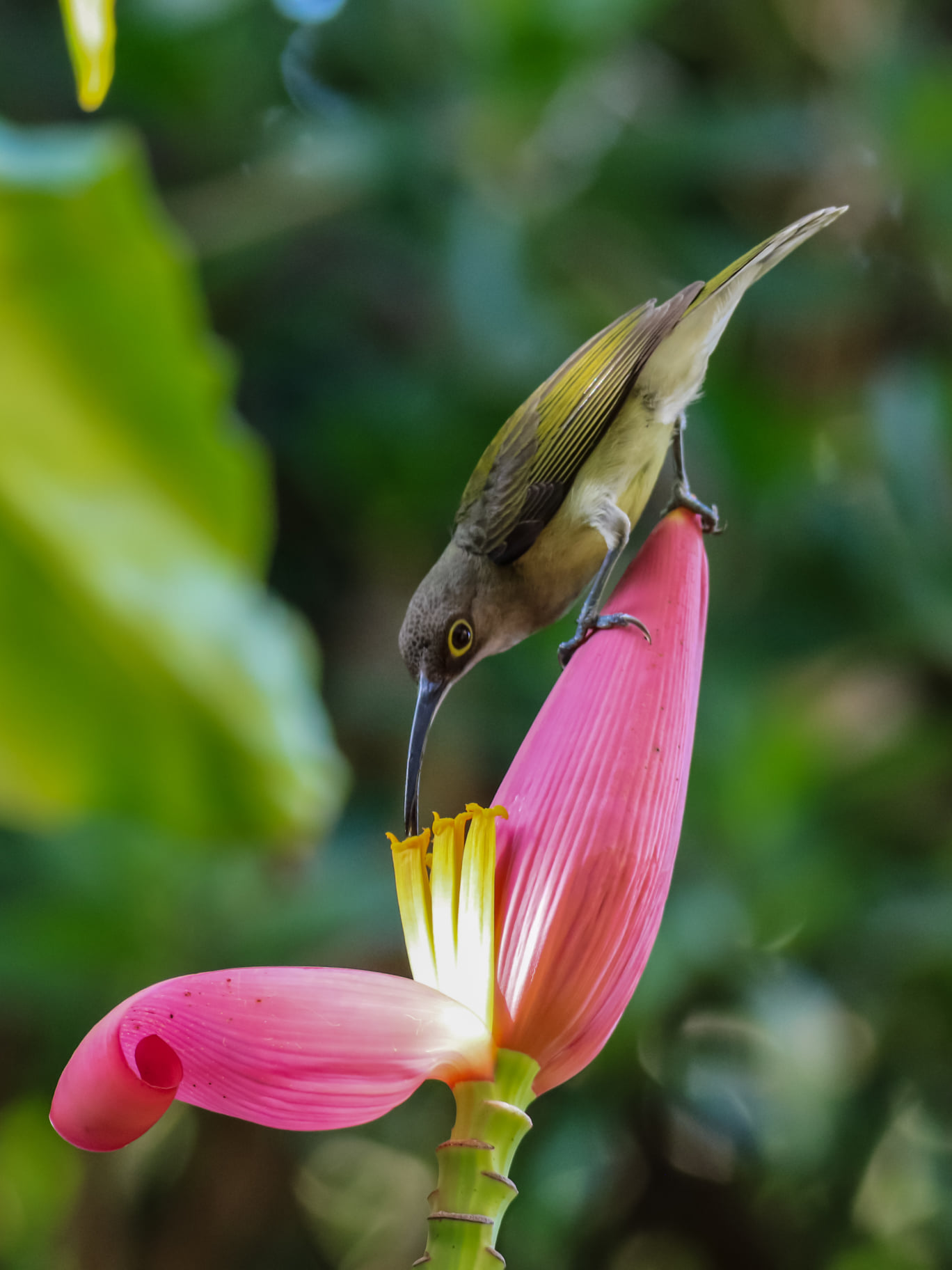

It was formerly considered conspecific with the little spiderhunter and orange-tufted spiderhunter, but the three were designated as distinct species in 2010. The pale spiderhunter differs from other two by its deeper and darker bill, longer tail, dark lores, and its striking eyering, gray breast and throat, and yellower wing edges.

This species is monotypic and has no subspecies.

== Ecology and behavior ==
This species' diet has not yet been comprehensively studied but it is assumed to have a similar diet as the formerly conspecific Little spiderhunter which feeds on nectar, insects and spiders. It has been known to show nectar robbing behavior. It typically forages alone or in pairs in the lower levels of vegetation.

Nothing has been published about its breeding habits.

== Habitat and conservation status ==
Its habitat is primary lowland forest and second growth but it does occasionally visit secondary growth and banana plantations. It is found up to 1,000 meters (3,300 ft) above sea level.

It is assessed as least-concern species under the IUCN as it seems to be tolerant of degraded habitat and is still common across its range. However, Palawan's forests are under threat due to illegal logging, deforestation, land conversion and mining. The whole of Palawan was designated as a Biosphere Reserve; however, protection and enforcement of laws has been difficult and these threats still continue. It occurs in just one protected area in the Iwahig Prison and Penal Farm.
