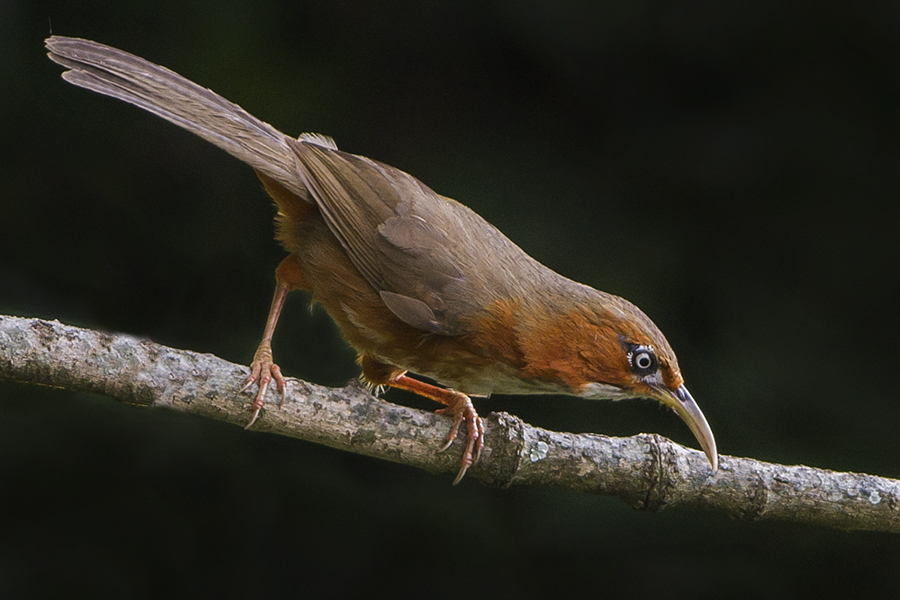
- E. e. erythrogenys, Ghatgarh, Nainital, Uttarakhand, India.

Conservation status
- Least Concern (IUCN 3.1)

Scientific classification
- Kingdom: Animalia
- Phylum: Chordata
- Class: Aves
- Order: Passeriformes
- Family: Timaliidae
- Genus: Erythrogenys
- Species: E. erythrogenys

Binomial name
- Erythrogenys erythrogenys (Vigors, 1831)

= Rusty-cheeked scimitar babbler =

Species of bird

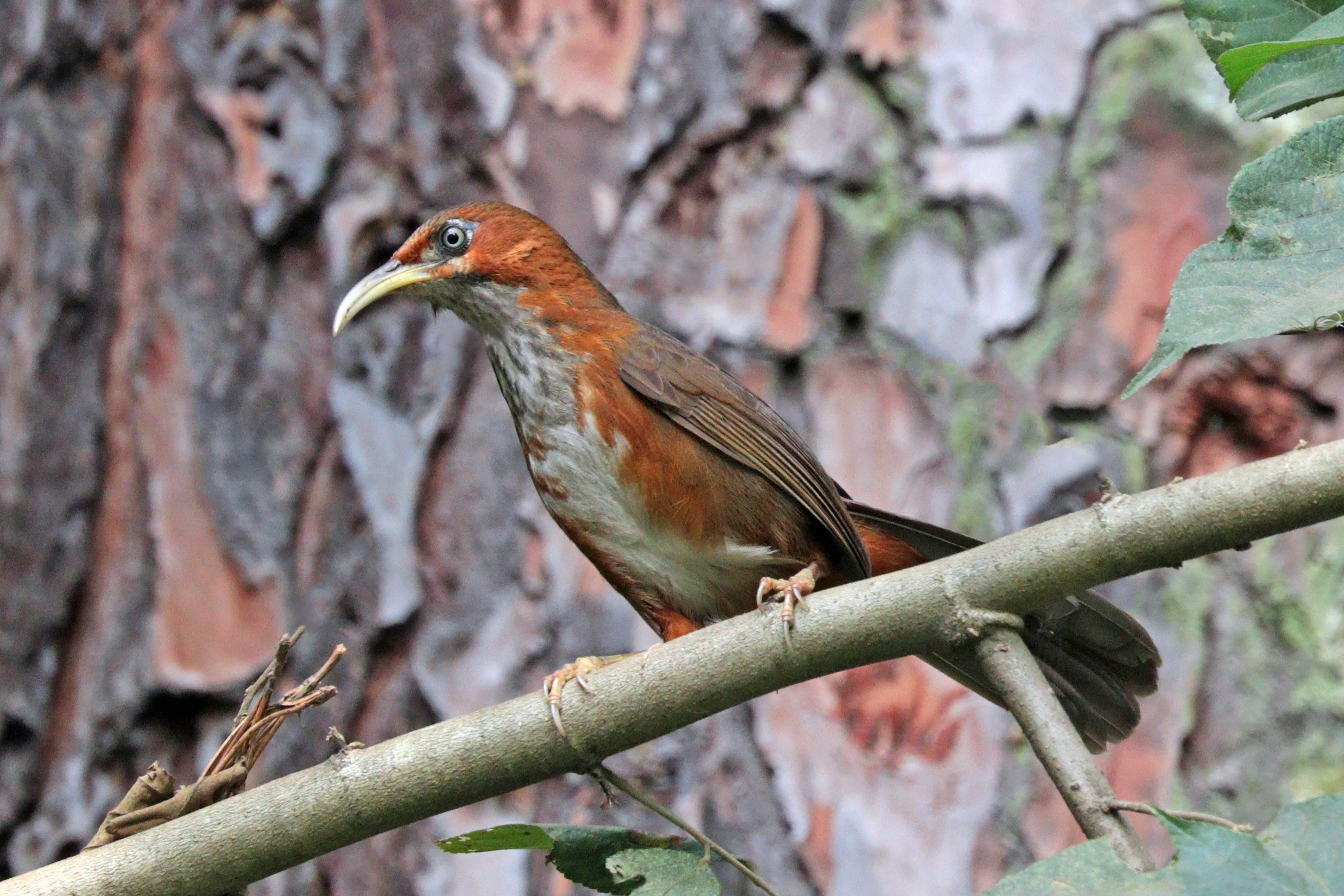
E. e. ferrugilatus Nagarjun Forest, Kathmandu, Nepal

The rusty-cheeked scimitar babbler (Erythrogenys erythrogenys) is a passerine bird in the babbler family Timaliidae that is found in the Himalayas from northeast Pakistan to Bhutan. It was formerly considered as conspecific with the red-eyed scimitar babbler that is found in eastern Myanmar and northwestern Thailand.

== Taxonomy ==
The rusty-cheeked scimitar babbler was formally described in 1831 by the Irish zoologist Nicholas Vigors under the binomial name Pamatorhynus erythrogenys in John Gould's book "Century of Birds from the Himalaya Mountains". The description was accompanied by a hand coloured illustration drawn by Elizabeth Gould. In 1924 the type locality was restricted to "Shimla–Almora". The specific epithet combines the Ancient Greek ερυθρος/eruthros meaning "red" with γενυος/genuos meaning "cheek". The rusty-cheeked scimitar babbler is now one of seven scimitar babblers placed in the genus Erythrogenys. The species was formerly regarded as conspecific with the red-eyed scimitar babbler (Erythrogenys imberbis) that is found in eastern Myanmar and northwestern Thailand. The red-eyed scimitar babbler is now considered as a separate species based on the differences in morphology and vocalization.

Three subspecies are recognised:

- E. e. erythrogenys (Vigors, 1831) – west Himalayas (northeast Pakistan and north India)
- E. e. ferrugilatus (Hodgson, 1836) – west, central Nepal
- E. e. haringtoni (Baker, ECS, 1914) – east Nepal to east Bhutan

== Description ==
The species is olive-brown above, with rusty colouring on the sides of the face, head, thighs, and flanks. The belly is mostly white. Sexes are alike. The beak is long and decurved in a scimitar shape.

== Distribution and habitat ==
The rusty-cheeked scimitar babbler is found from the Himalayas to Myanmar. It inhabits subtropical or tropical moist lowland forest and subtropical or tropical moist montane forest habitats at elevations up to 2,600 m (8,500 ft).

== Ecology ==
The bird feeds mostly on the forest floor and in low canopy, forming small groups. Food items include insects, grubs and seeds. Calls consist of a mellow, fluty whistle, a two-noted "CUE..PE...CUE..pe" call followed by single note replay by mate, guttural alarm calls and a liquid contact note. The species is generally quite noisy.
