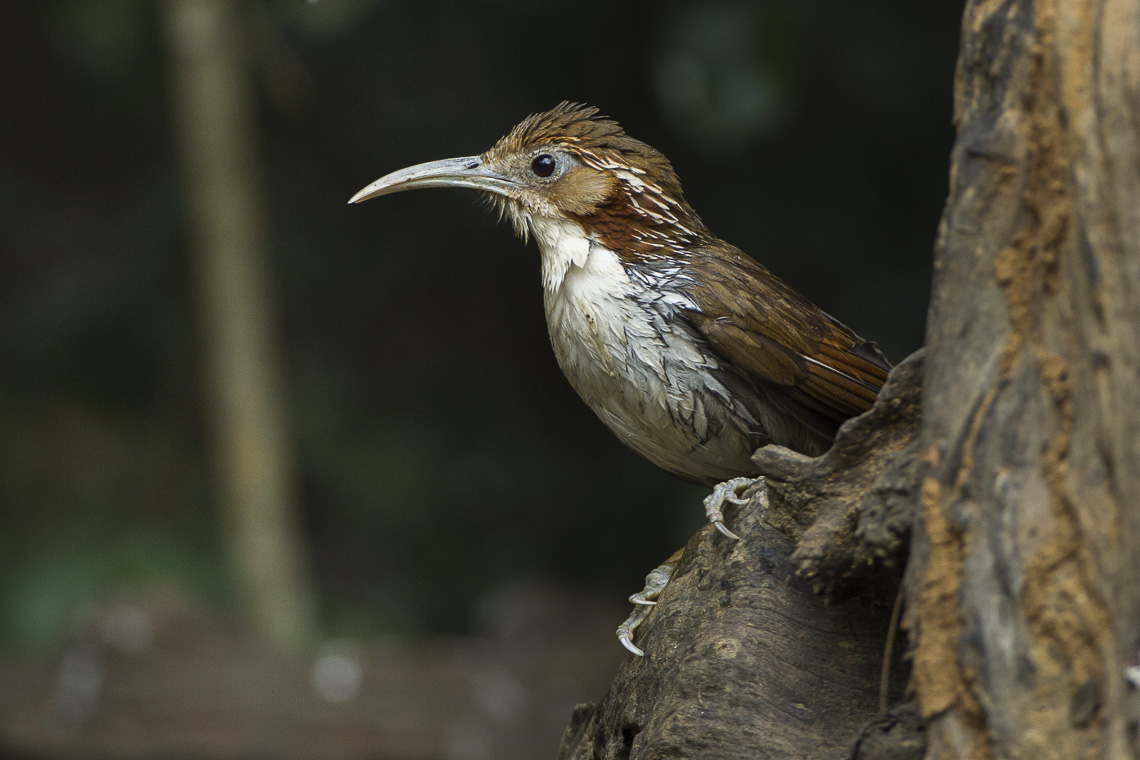
- Large scimitar babbler (Erythrogenys hypoleucos)

Scientific classification
- Kingdom: Animalia
- Phylum: Chordata
- Class: Aves
- Order: Passeriformes
- Family: Timaliidae
- Genus: Erythrogenys; Baker, 1930

Type species
- Pomatorhinus erythrogenys Vigors, 1831

Species
- See text

Synonyms
- Megapomatorhinus Moyle et al., 2012

= Erythrogenys =

Genus of birds

Erythrogenys is a genus of scimitar babblers, jungle birds with long downcurved bills. These are birds of tropical Asia.

== Taxonomy ==
The genus Erythrogenys was introduced in 1930 by the British ornithologist E. C. Stuart Baker. He specified the type species as Pomatorhinus erythrogens that had been described in 1831 by Nicholas Vigors. The genus name combines the Ancient Greek ερυθρος/eruthros meaning "red" with γενυος/genuos meaning "cheek".

The genus contains seven species:

Image	Common name	Scientific name	Distribution
	Large scimitar babbler	Erythrogenys hypoleucos	Bangladesh, Cambodia, China, India, Laos, Malaysia, Myanmar, Thailand, and Vietnam
	Rusty-cheeked scimitar babbler	Erythrogenys erythrogenys	Himalayas from northeast Pakistan to Bhutan
	Red-eyed scimitar babbler	Erythrogenys imberbis (split from E. erythrogenys)	east Myanmar to northwest Thailand
	Spot-breasted scimitar babbler	Erythrogenys mcclellandi	Eastern Himalaya and western Myanmar
	Black-streaked scimitar babbler	Erythrogenys gravivox	China, Laos, Myanmar and Vietnam
	Grey-sided scimitar babbler	Erythrogenys swinhoei	southern China
	Black-necklaced scimitar babbler	Erythrogenys erythrocnemis	Taiwan.
