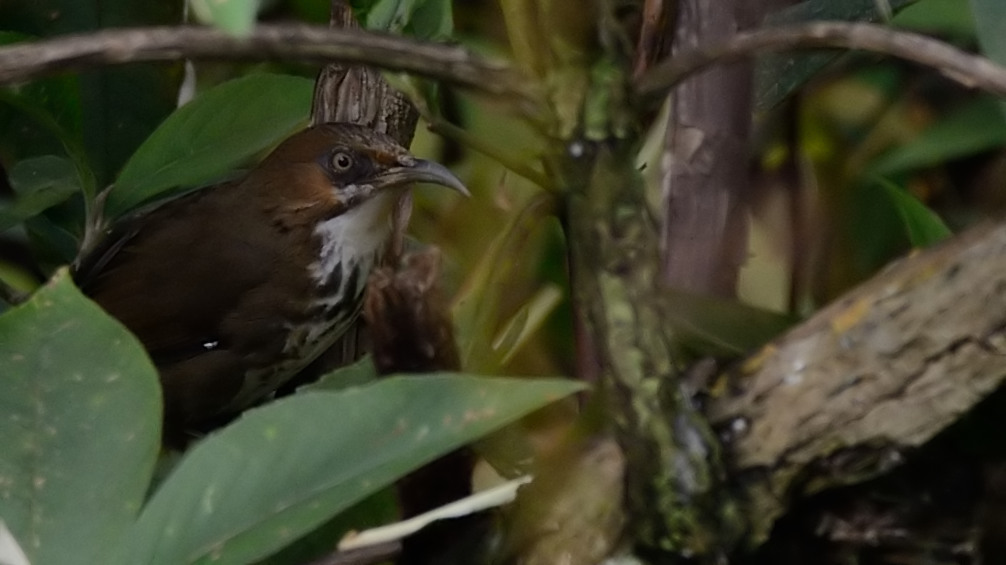
- at Khonoma, Nagaland

Conservation status
- Least Concern (IUCN 3.1)

Scientific classification
- Kingdom: Animalia
- Phylum: Chordata
- Class: Aves
- Order: Passeriformes
- Family: Timaliidae
- Genus: Erythrogenys
- Species: E. mcclellandi

Binomial name
- Erythrogenys mcclellandi (Godwin-Austen, 1870)

= Spot-breasted scimitar babbler =

Species of bird

The spot-breasted scimitar babbler (Erythrogenys mcclellandi) is a species of bird in the family Timaliidae.

It is found in Eastern Himalaya and western Myanmar. Its natural habitats are subtropical or tropical moist lowland forest and subtropical or tropical moist montane forest. It is threatened by the bioaccumulation of mercury in its features.
