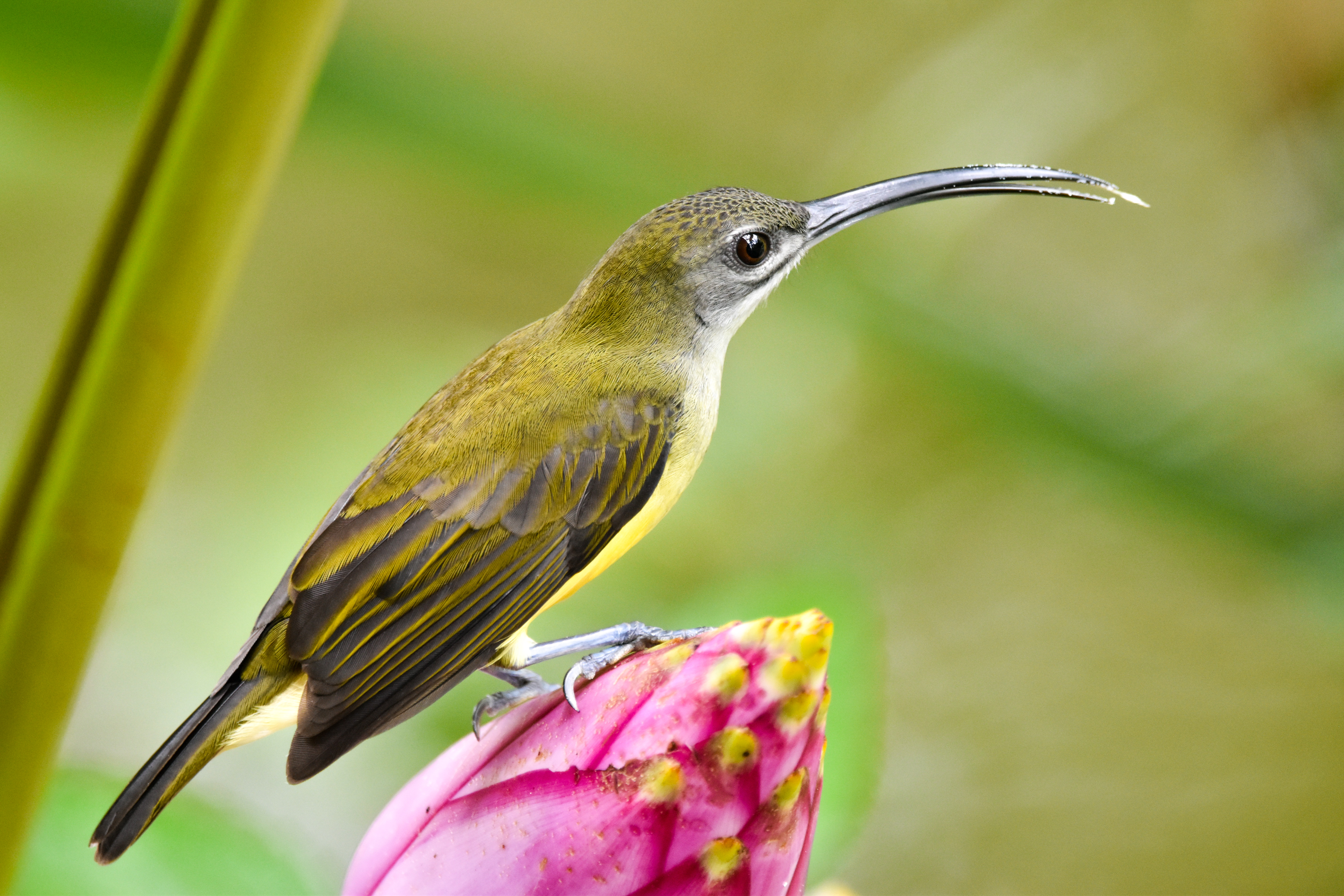
- A. l. longirostra (Sabah, Borneo)

Conservation status
- Least Concern (IUCN 3.1)

Scientific classification
- Kingdom: Animalia
- Phylum: Chordata
- Class: Aves
- Order: Passeriformes
- Family: Nectariniidae
- Genus: Arachnothera
- Species: A. longirostra

Binomial name
- Arachnothera longirostra (Latham, 1790)

= Little spiderhunter =

Species of bird

The little spiderhunter (Arachnothera longirostra) is a species of long-billed nectar-feeding bird in the family Nectariniidae found in the moist forests of South and Southeast Asia. Unlike typical sunbirds, males and females are very similar in plumage. They are usually seen in ones or twos and frequently make a tzeck call. They are most often found near flowering plants where they obtain nectar.

== Description ==
The distinctive long beak set it apart from other sunbirds. The sexes are similar, except that the female has a paler base on the lower mandible. Male has all black beak. They are found near their favourite nectar bearing trees, often species of wild Musaceae or flowers in gardens. They have a buzzy zick-zick call that is made regularly when disturbed or when foraging. Additionally, the song is series of rapid chipping notes and these can go on for long periods.

== Taxonomy ==
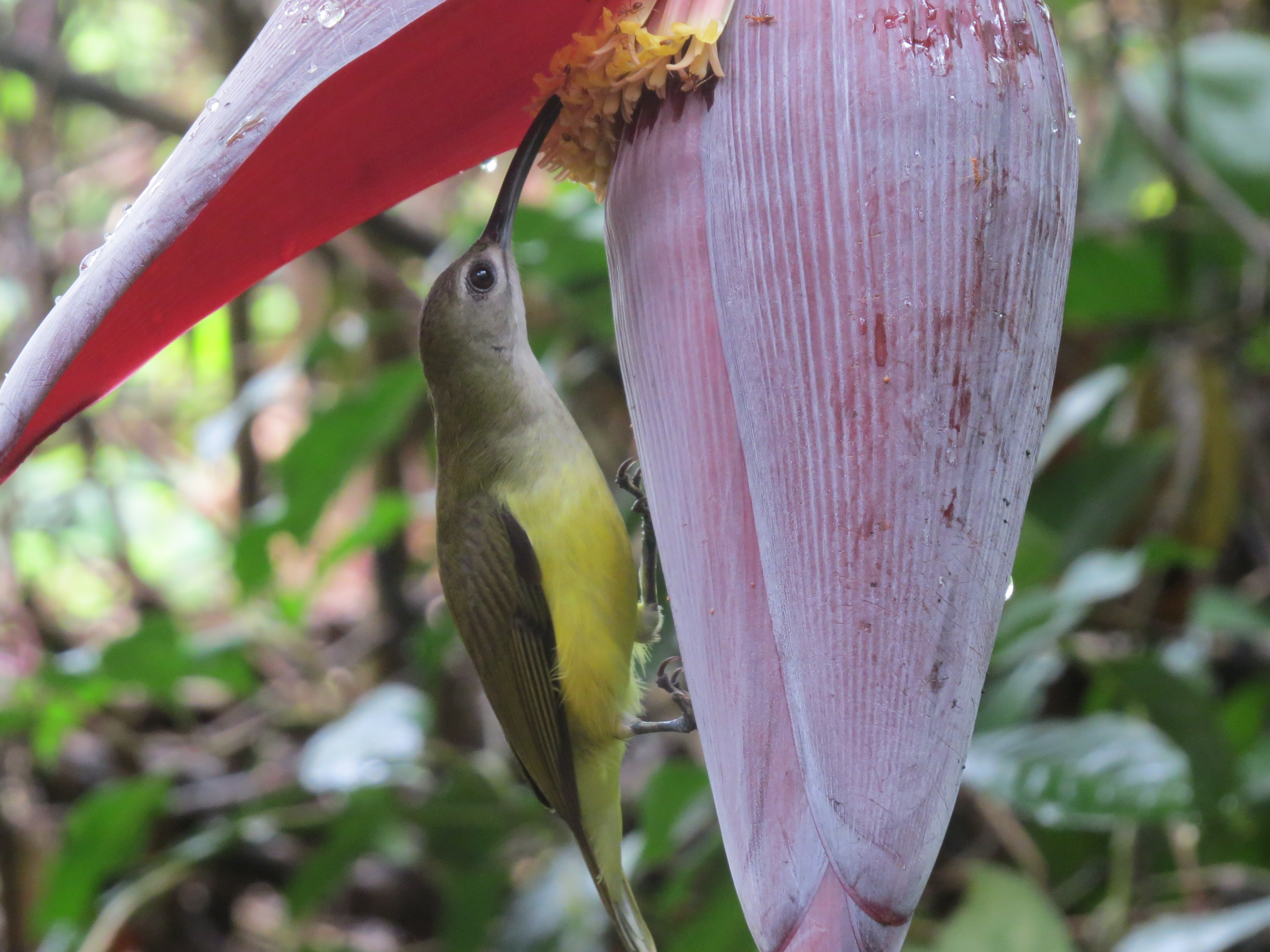
Little spiderhunter foraging on Musa sp.

The genus name Arachnothera means "spider hunter" and the species epithet refers to the long beak. About thirteen geographic races are recognized. The nominate race longirostra (Latham, 1790) is found in southwestern India, central and northeastern India, foothills of the Himalayas and into Thailand and Yunnan. Race sordida La Touche, 1921 is found in southern China and northeastern Thailand. Race pallida Delacour, 1932 is found in eastern Thailand and C & S Indochina. Two species from the Philippines, the orange-tufted and the pale spiderhunter were formerly considered subspecies. Several other island forms are noted:

- cinereicollis (Vieillot, 1819) – south of the Isthmus of Kra to Sumatra and satellite islands
- zarhina Oberholser, 1912 – Banyak Is, off W Sumatra.
- niasensis van Oort, 1910 – Nias I, off W Sumatra.
- rothschildi van Oort, 1910 – N Natuna Is.
- atita Oberholser, 1932 – S Natuna Is.
- buettikoferi van Oort, 1910 – Borneo.
- prillwitzi Hartert, 1901 – Java (including Madura I) and Bali
- randi Salomonsen, 1953 – Basilan (off W Mindanao).

== Distribution and habitat ==
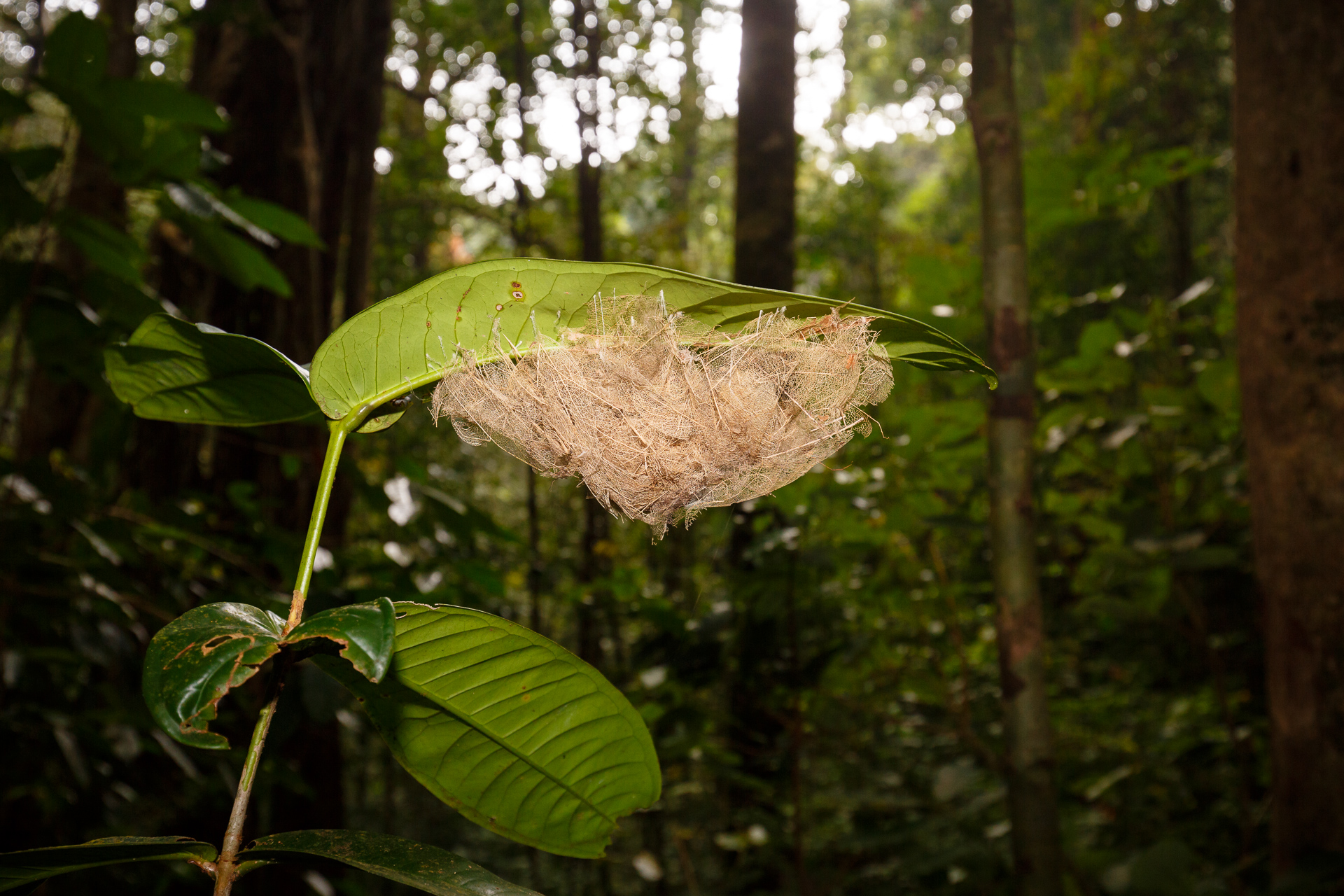
Nest under a leaf

The species is found in Bangladesh, Bhutan, Brunei, Cambodia, China, India, Indonesia, Laos, Malaysia, Myanmar, Nepal, Philippines, Thailand, and Vietnam. Within India, there are disjunct populations in the Eastern Ghats from Lamasinghi, Visakhapatnam and parts of Orissa) and the Western Ghats apart from the main distribution in north-east India that extends into Southeast Asia. A record from the Nicobar Islands is considered doubtful.

Its natural habitats are subtropical or tropical moist lowland forests, subtropical or tropical mangrove forests, and subtropical or tropical moist montane forests. It is usually found below the canopy. They are also found in gardens, attracted especially by flowers that yield nectar.

== Behaviour and ecology ==
Song of A. l. longirostra, from Kerala, India

They have been noted as good pollinators of wild banana species and several species of the ginger family and often visit Loranthus sp. (= Dendrophthoe sp.), Bombax malabaricum and Erythrina indica for nectar. They are often seen in plantations in forest areas. Although they are more often seen in secondary forests or in clearings and appear to be tolerant of human activities, they have become extinct in some forest fragments. In Singapore they have gone locally extinct within the botanical garden.

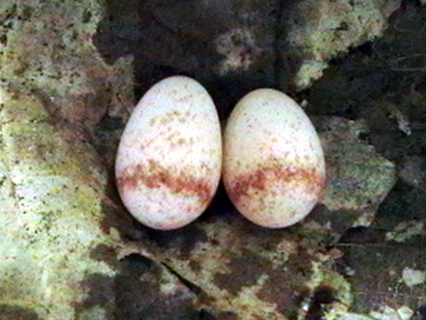
Little spiderhunter eggs

Calls

The breeding season in northeastern India is March to September but mainly May to August. In southern India it breeds from December to August. Two eggs are the usual clutch. The nest is a compact cup attached under a leaf of banana or similar broad leaved plant. The nest is hammock-like and suspended from the underside of a leaf using 150 or so "pop-rivets" of cobwebs and vegetable fibre, a unique method of using spider silk for animal architecture.

It is suspected that Hodgson's hawk-cuckoo and violet cuckoo are brood parasites on this species in India.

A species of haemosporidian, Leucocytozoon, has been noted in specimens from Malaysia.

== In culture ==
In Sarawak, the Kayan, Kenyah and Punan people consider it a bird of good omen and when they are out collecting camphor, the men would wait until they heard the sit call of one of these spiderhunters.

== Other references ==
- Rahman, M. A. 2006. Patterns of morphological variation in the little spiderhunter (Arachnothera longirostra) in Taman Negara, Peninsular Malaysia and Thale Ban National Park, Thailand. In: Othman, S., Yatim, S. H., Elagupillay, S., Md. Nor, S., Ahmad, N., and Mohd Sah, S. H (eds.), Pp: 207–214, Management and Status of Resources in Protected Areas for Peninsular Malaysia. Department of Wildlife and National Parks, Kuala Lumpur. ISBN 983-43010-0-6.
- Khan, AR (1977): Territoriality among Sunbirds and Spiderhunter. Newsletter for Birdwatchers . 17(1), 5–6.
- Law, SC (1945). "Note on the occurrence of some hitherto unrecorded birds in central and South Bengal". Ibis. 87 (3): 405–408. doi:10.1111/j.1474-919x.1945.tb01372.x.
