= Maraland Democratic Front =

Maraland Democratic Fronts
- Founder: P. P. Thawla
- Founded: 2003
- Dissolved: 2017
- Merged into: Bharatiya Janata Party
- Colours: Orange

Maraland Democratic Front was a regional political party in the Indian state of Mizoram. The party was active amongst the Mara people in the southern part of the state. The party had run the Mara Autonomous District Council (one of three autonomous districts in Mizoram) together with Indian National Congress in the previous term.

== Electoral history ==
In the 2003 Mizoram Legislative Assembly election, the MDF put up candidates in two constituencies (out of 40 in total in the state). The party president and founder, P. P. Thawla was able to get elected from Tuipang. P.P. Thawla participated in the MNF-led state government, and was minister for Excise and Soil & Water conservation but later resigned because of a decrease in the number of cabinet ministers.

In the 2008 Mizoram Legislative Assembly election, P.P. Thawla won the Palak seat with 4206 votes (33.37%). He was again the only representative of his party in the Mizoram Assembly.

The current president of the party is M. Laikaw, one of the founding members of MDF. The MDF formed a coalition with the MNF in the 2012 elections. However, the coalition lost the MADC elections to Congress, managing to secure 7 seats.

== Merger with BJP ==
On 12 July 2017, party Chairman P P Thawlla merged his wing of Maraland Democratic Front (MDF) with the Bharatiya Janata Party at a merger ceremony conducted in presence of BJP Mizoram state president, John V. Hluna.
