= Phura =

Coordinates: 22.234°N 92.910°E

Phura is a census town in Mara Autonomous District Council in the southern part of Mizoram state in Northeast India.

It is the fourth-largest village of Siaha District.
