= Siaha =

Siaha Saiha (Mizo)
- Town
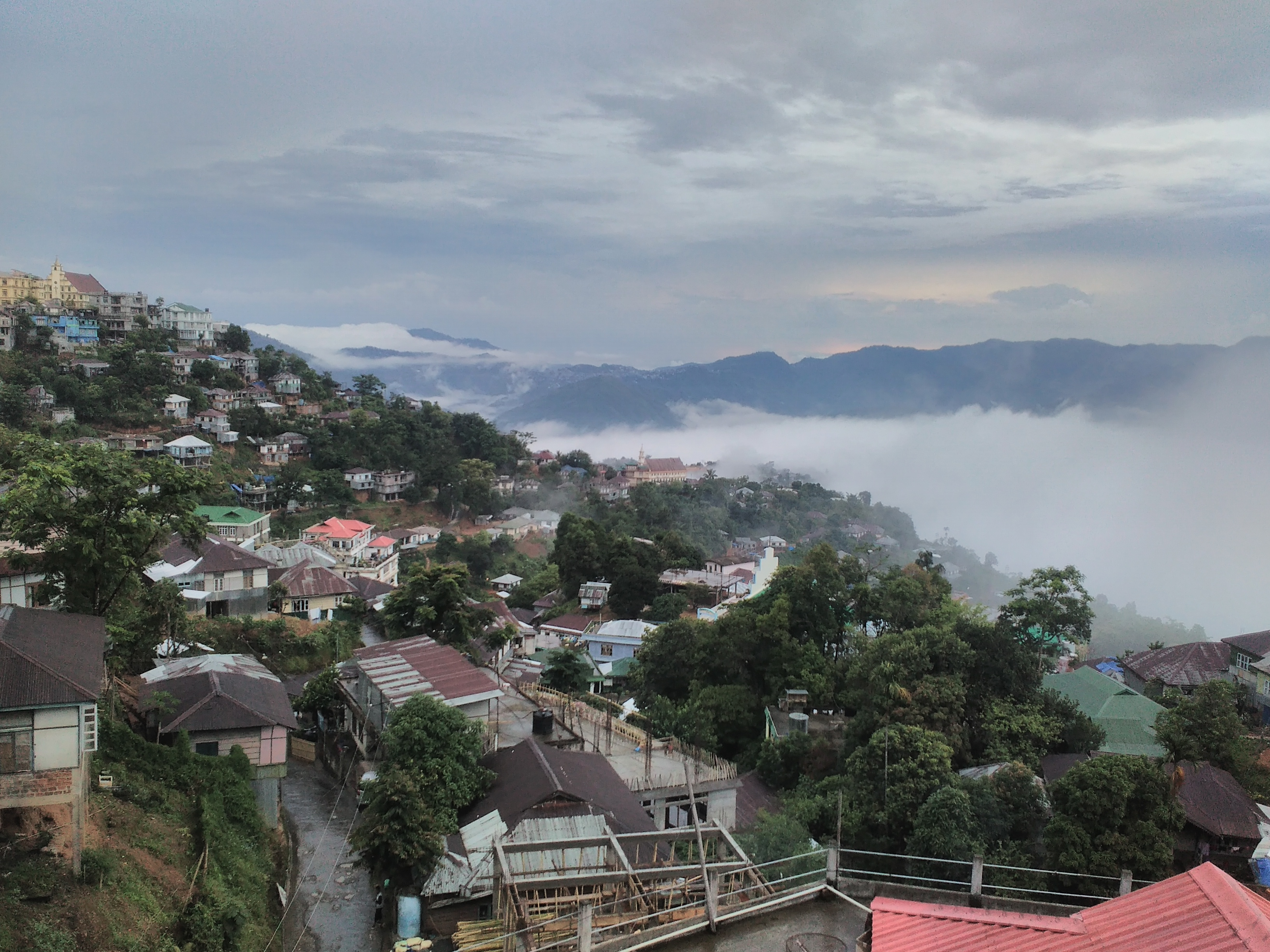

- Location within Mizoram Location within India
- Coordinates: 22.48°N 92.97°E
- Country: India
- State: Mizoram
- District: Saiha
- Elevation: 1,225 m (4,019 ft)

Population (2023)
  - Total: 35,500

Languages
  - Official: Mara
- Time zone: UTC+5:30 (IST)
- PIN Code: 796901
- Vehicle registration: MZ03
- Climate: Cwa
- Website: mizoram.nic.in

Siaha (Mara: Siaha, Burmese: ဆီယာဟာ) (official name given by the Mara Autonomous District Council, popularly known as Saiha) is a town and headquarters of Saiha District and the Mara Autonomous District Council in southern Mizoram, northeast India. It is the fourth most populous town in Mizoram.

== Geography ==
Siaha is located at 22.48°N 92.97°E.

== Demographics ==
As of 2001 India census, Siaha had a population of 19,731. Males constitute 52% of the population and females 48%. Siaha has an average literacy rate of 79%, higher than the national average of 59.5%: male literacy is 80%, and female literacy is 77%. In Siaha, 16% of the population is under 6 years of age. Siaha is the fastest growing town in Mizoram, 2008 statistical handbook of Mizoram reveals that the town has a population of 29,275 in 2008 against 19,731 in 2001.

== Transport ==
Pawan Hans has started a helicopter service connecting Aizawl and Siaha. The distance between Siaha and Aizawl through NH 54 is 378 km, and they are connected with regular bus and jeep service.

== Media ==
The Major Newspapers in Saiha are:

- Buannel
- Chhim Aw
- Kawl Eng
- Maraland
- Moonlight
- Mara Thlala
- Siaha Post
- Saikhawpui
- Siaha Times
- Awsicharu [awsicharu.wordpress.com]
- Deiva Mara Daily Deiva Mara Daily
