= Chakhei =

- town
- Location within Mizoram Location within India
- Coordinates: 22.29194°N 93.13943°E
- Country: India
- State: Mizoram
- District: Siaha
- Elevation: 888 m (2,913 ft)

Population (2001)
  - Total: 2,852

Languages
  - Official: Mizo
- Time zone: UTC+5:30 (IST)
- Telephone code: 03835
- Vehicle registration: MZ
- Website: mizoram.nic.in

Chakhei or Chakhang is one of the villages/towns in Southern part of India's north-eastern state of Mizoram.
