= Siaha district =

- District of Mizoram
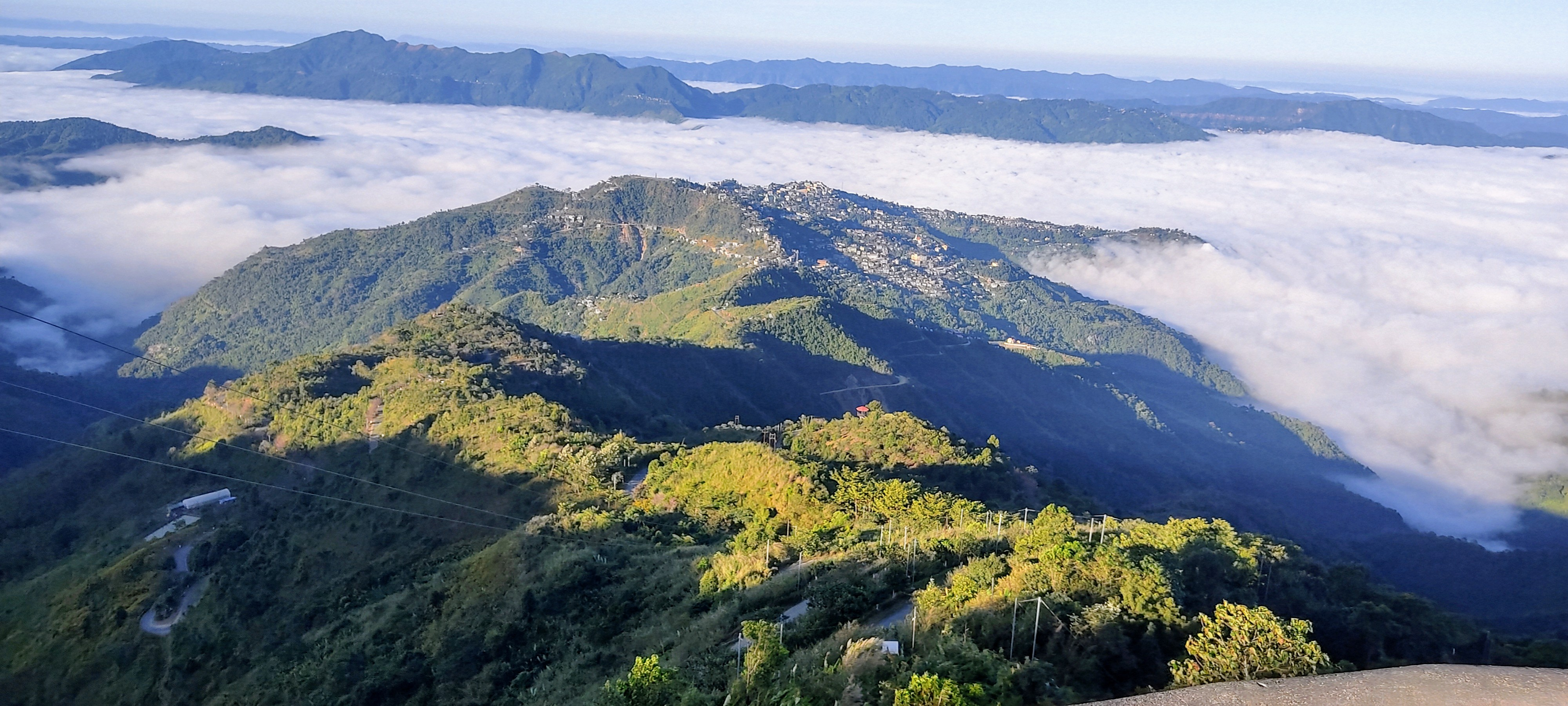
- View of Siaha from Tlapi Viewpoint

- Location in Mizoram
- Interactive map of Siaha district
- Coordinates (Siaha): 22.485°N 92.980°E
- Country: India
- State: Mizoram
- Headquarters: Siaha

Government
  - Lok Sabha constituencies: Mizoram
  - Vidhan Sabha constituencies: 2

Area
  - District of Mizoram: 1,400 km^{2} (540 sq mi)

Population (2011)
  - District of Mizoram: 56,574
  - Density: 40/km^{2} (100/sq mi)
  - Urban: 25,110 (44.38%)

Demographics
  - Literacy: 90.01
  - Sex ratio: 979
- Time zone: UTC+05:30 (IST)
- Website: siaha.nic.in

Siaha district is one of the eleven districts of Mizoram state in India. The district is bounded on the northwest by Lunglei district, on the north and west by Lawngtlai District and on the south and east by Myanmar. The district occupies an area of 1399.9 km^{2}. Siaha town is the administrative headquarters of the Mara Autonomous District Council. The population had Increased from 56,574 (in 2011 census) to 67,658 (in 2021). It is the least populous district of Mizoram (out of 8).

== History ==
Siaha District was formerly part of Chhimtuipui District. In 1998 when Chhimtuipui District was split in half, the half that became Saiha District was briefly called by the old name Chhimtuipui District. In 2016 Saiha District was renamed to Siaha District following the rename of Siaha town in the previous year.

== Economy ==
In 2006 the Ministry of Panchayati Raj named Siaha one of the country's 250 most backward districts (out of a total of 640). It is one of the two districts in Mizoram currently receiving funds from the Backward Regions Grant Fund Programme (BRGF).

== Demographics ==
Historical population
Year	Pop.	±% p.a.
1971	13,508	—
1981	22,143	+5.07%
1991	34,930	+4.66%
2001	60,823	+5.70%
2011	56,574	−0.72%

Religions in Saiha district (2011)
Religion	Percent
Christianity	97.18%
Hinduism	1.65%
Islam	0.91%
Other or not stated	0.26%

According to the 2011 census Siaha district has a population of 56,574, roughly equal to the island of Greenland. This gives it a ranking of 628th in India (out of a total of 640). The district has a population density of 40 inhabitants per square kilometre (100/sq mi). Its population growth rate over the decade 2001-2011 was −7.34%; the only district in Mizoram to have decreased population. Siaha has a sex ratio of 979 females for every 1000 males, and a literacy rate of 90.01%. 44.38% of the population lives in urban areas. Scheduled Tribes make up 96.59% of the population.

The majority of the district inhabitants are Mara people, who also have an autonomous district council called Mara Autonomous District Council composed of the two R.D. Blocks of Siaha and Tuipang.

Languages spoken in Saiha district (2011)
1. Mara (72.1%)
2. Mizo (16.8%)
3. Pawi (5.36%)
4. Hindi (1.04%)
5. Bengali (0.93%)
6. Others (3.76%)

According to the 2011 census, 72.14% of the population spoke Mara, 16.77% Mizo, 5.36% Pawi, 1.04% Hindi and 0.93% Bengali as their first language.

== Flora and fauna ==
In 2007 Siaha district became home to Tokalo wildlife sanctuary, which has an area of 250 km^{2} (96.5 mi^{2}).
