= 1889 Birthday Honours =

National awards given by Queen Victoria

The 1889 Birthday Honours were appointments by Queen Victoria to various orders and honours to reward and highlight good works by citizens of the British Empire. The appointments were made to celebrate the official birthday of The Queen, and were published in the London Gazette on 24 May 1889 and in The Times on 25 May 1889.

The recipients of honours are displayed here as they were styled before their new honour, and arranged by honour, with classes (Knight, Knight Grand Cross, etc.) and then divisions (Military, Civil, etc.) as appropriate.

== United Kingdom and British Empire ==
=== Baronetcies ===
- Joseph Edgar Boehm, Royal Academy.
- George Burns, the founder of the Cunard Line of steamships.
- William Mackinnon CIE
- Sir George Hornidge Porter FRCSI Surgeon-in-Ordinary to Her Majesty in Ireland.
- Professor George Stokes MP President of the Royal Society.

=== Knight Bachelor ===
- Arthur Blomfield ARA
- Charles Frederick Blaine, for services rendered to the Cape of Good Hope.
- Benjamin Benjamin, Mayor of the city of Melbourne.
- Joseph Crosland, of Huddersfield.
- William Crundall, Mayor of Dover.
- Edmund Grattan, late Her Majesty's Consul-General at Antwerp.
- William Macleay, of New South Wales.
- Andrew Reed, Inspector-General of the Royal Irish Constabulary.
- James Russell CMG Chief Justice of Hong Kong.
- James Roberton, professor of conveyancing at Glasgow University.
- Aubrey Walsh, formerly Chairman of the Justices of Liberty of the Tower.

=== The Most Honourable Order of the Bath ===
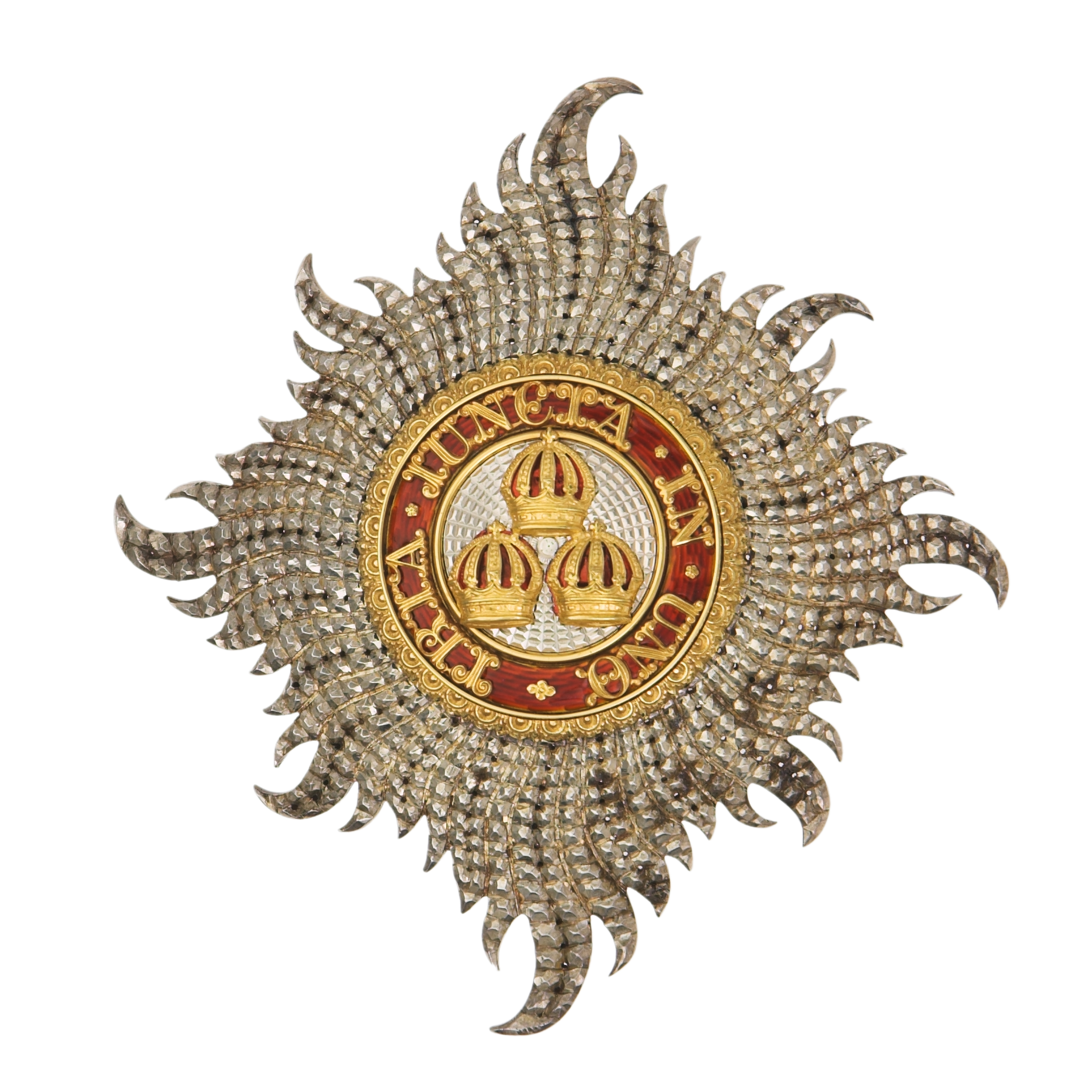
Civilian star of the Knight Grand Cross of the Order of the Bath

==== Knight Grand Cross of the Order of the Bath (GCB) ====
Military Division

- Admiral His Royal Highness Alfred Ernest Albert, Duke of Edinburgh KG KT KP GCSI GCMG GCIE KCB Personal Aide-de-Camp to the Queen.
- General Sir Frederick Horn KCB
- General Sir John St George KCB Royal Artillery.
- General Sir Archibald Little KCB
- General Sir Henry Daly KCB CIE Bombay Staff Corps.
- Lt.-Gen. and Honorary General Sir Alexander Taylor KCB Royal Engineers.

Civil Division

- Sir William Jenner Bt KCB one of the Physicians in Ordinary to Her Majesty.

==== Knight Commander of the Order of the Bath (KCB) ====
Military Division

- Admiral the Hon. Arthur Auckland Leopold Pedro Cochrane CB RN Retired List.
- General John William Schneider CB Bombay Infantry.
- Admiral Algernon McLennan Lyons RN
- Lt.-Gen. and Honorary General Charles Cameron Shute CB
- Lt.-Gen. George Wentworth Alexander Higginson CB Lieutenant of the Tower of London.
- Lt.-Gen. and Honorary General the Hon. David Macdowall Fraser CB Royal Artillery.
- Lt.-Gen. Allen Bayard Johnson CB Bengal Staff Corps.
- Maj.-Gen., and Honorary Lt.-Gen. William Augustus Fyers CB
- Maj.-Gen. the Hon. James Charlemagne Dormer CB Commanding the Force in Egypt.
- Rear-Admiral the Hon. Edmund Robert Fremantle CB CMG RN
- Maj.-Gen. Richard Harrison CB CMG Royal Engineers.

Civil Division

- Henry Longley CB Chief Charity Commissioner for England and Wales

==== Companion of the Order of the Bath (CB) ====
Military Division

- Lt.-Gen. Alexander Carnegy, Bombay Staff Corps.
- Lt.-Gen. David MacFarlan, Royal Artillery.
- Lt.-Gen. James Blair VC Bombay Cavalry.
- Maj.-Gen. George Digby Barker.
- Maj.-Gen. Hastings Fraser, Madras Staff Corps.
- Capt. Henry Frederick Stephenson CB Royal Navy, Aide-de-Camp to the Queen.
- Lt.-Col. and Col. Richard William Charles Winsloe, Aide-de-Camp to the Queen.
- Lt.-Col. and Col. Robert Grant, Royal Engineers, Deputy Adjutant-General Royal Engineers, Headquarters of the Army.
- Col. Henry Wood, 9th Regimental District.
- Lt.-Col. and Col. Frederick Lance, Bengal Staff Corps.
- Lt.-Col. and Col. George Corrie Bird, Madras Staff Corps.
- Lt.-Col. and Col. John Hugh Green, Bengal Staff Corps.
- Col. (with the rank of Brigadier-General) Boyce Albert Combe, Commanding a Second Class District of the Bombay Army.
- Thales Pease, Deputy Commissary General of Ordnance, with the honorary rank of Colonel, Ordnance Store Department.
- Col. William Lewis Kinloch Ogilvy, Assistant Adjutant-General, Cork District.
- Lt.-Col. and Col. FitzRoy Stephen.
- Maj. and Col. Geoffrey Barton, the Royal Fusiliers (City of London Regiment).
- Maj. and Col. Arthur FitzRoy Hart, the East Surrey Regiment.
- Lt.-Col. and Col. Henry Grey MacGregor, Aide-de-Camp to the Queen.
- Maj. and Col. Andrew Gilbert Wauchope CMG The Black Watch (Royal Highlanders).
- Maj. William George Knox, Royal Artillery.
- Maj. George Blake Napier Martin, Royal Artillery.

Civil Division

- The Hon. Eric Barrington, Foreign Office.
- Doctor James Bell FRS Principal of the Laboratory Department, Inland Revenue.
- Col. William Bell, late 64th Foot, Aide-de-Camp to the Queen, Government Secretary to the Lt.-Governor of Guernsey.
- Henry Thomas de la Bere, Deputy Accountant-General, War Office.
- Wilfred Joseph Cripps FSA
- David Harrel, Chief Commissioner of the Dublin Metropolitan Police.
- Doctor James Reid, Physician Extraordinary to Her Majesty.
- George Lisle Ryder, Principal Clerk in the Treasury.
- Maj. Henry Samuel Spiller Watkin, Royal Artillery, Inspector of Position Finding, Department of Director of Artillery.
- Edward Wingfield, Assistant Under-Secretary of State, Colonial Office.

=== The Imperial Order of the Crown of India ===
- Her Highness Princess Victoria Louise Sophia Augusta Amélia Helena of Schleswig-Holstein.
- Her Serene Highness Princess Victoria Mary Augusta Louise Olga Pauline Claudine Agnes of Teck.

=== The Most Exalted Order of the Star of India ===
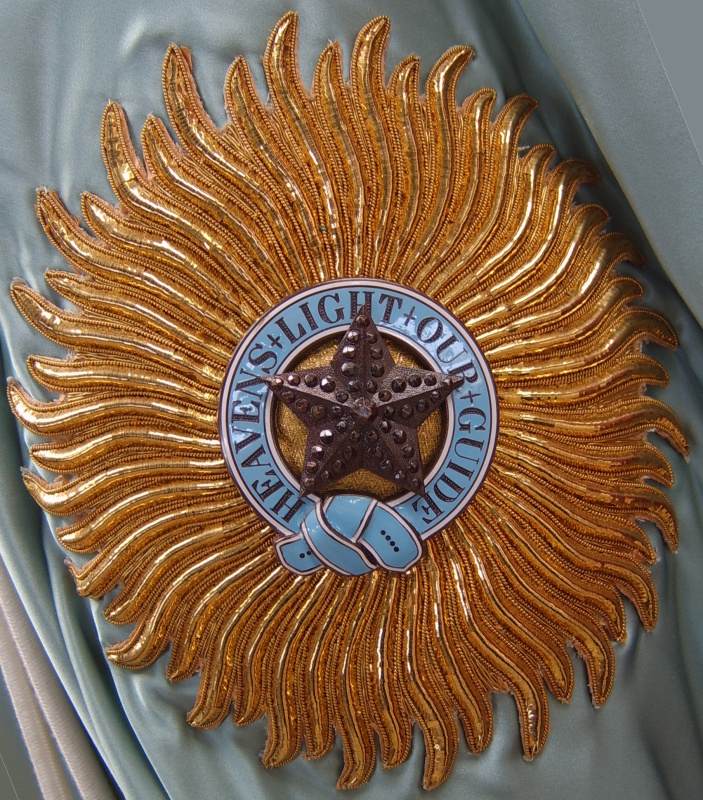
Star of a Knight Grand Commander of the Most Exalted Order of the Star of India.

==== Knight Commander (KCSI) ====
- Col. Henry Yule CB Royal (late Bengal) Engineers, Member of the Council of the Secretary of State for India.

==== Companion (CSI) ====
- Col. Edward Lacon Ommanney, Bengal Staff Corps.
- Henry Edward Stokes, Madras Civil Service, Member of the Council of the Governor of Madras.

=== The Most Distinguished Order of Saint Michael and Saint George ===
Star of the Order of Saint Michael and Saint George.

==== Knight Grand Cross of the Order of St Michael and St George (GCMG) ====
- Sir Robert Hart KCMG Inspector-General of Chinese Imperial Maritime Customs.
- Sir Thomas Francis Wade KCB late Her Majesty's Envoy Extraordinary and Minister Plenipotentiary at Pekin.

Honorary Knight Grand Cross

- Riaz Pasha KCMG Prime Minister of Egypt.

==== Knight Commander of the Order of St Michael and St George (KCMG) ====
- Charles Bruce CMG Lt.-Governor and Government Secretary of the Colony of British Guiana.
- Langham Dale Superintendent-General of Education of the Cape of Good Hope, and Vice-Chancellor of the University of that Colony.
- James Shaw Hay CMG Governor and Commander-in-Chief of the Colony of Sierra Leone.
- Sir James MacBain Kt President of the Legislative Council of the Colony of Victoria.
- William MacGregor CMG Administrator of the Possession of British New Guinea.
- John Robinson, Member of the Legislative Council of Natal.
- Walter Joseph Sendall CMG Governor and Comraander-in-Chief of the Windward Islands.
- Lt.-Gen. Sir Henry D'Oyley Torrens KCB Governor and Commander-in-Chief of the Island of Malta.
- Capt. John Sydney Webb, Deputy-Master of the Corporation of the Trinity House, for services in connection with Lighthouses in the Colonies and abroad.

==== Companion of the Order of St Michael and St George (CMG) ====
- William George Aston, Japanese Secretary to Her Majesty's Legation in Japan.
- Charles Gage Brown Medical Adviser to the Colonial Office.
- Edward Ciantar, Member of the Council of Government of the Island of Malta.
- John Stokell Dodds, Puisne Judge of the Supreme Court of Tasmania, and Representative of that Colony at the Colonial Conference of 1857.
- Robert Lewis John Ellery, Government Astronomer of the Colony of Victoria.
- Hubert Edward Henry Jerningham, Colonial Secretary of British Honduras.
- Robert Baxter Llewelyn, Administrator of the Island of Saint Lucia.
- Lloyd William Mathews, a General in the Army of His Highness the Sultan of Zanzibar.
- George Thomas Michael O'Brien, Treasurer of the Island of Ceylon.
- Ponnambalam Ramanathan, Member of the Legislative Council of the Island of Ceylon.
- Frederick Warner, Member of the Legislative Council of the Colony of Trinidad.
- Louis Antoine Aimé de Vertéuil, Member of the Legislative Council of the Colony of Trinidad.

=== The Most Eminent Order of the Indian Empire ===
==== Knight Commander (KCIE) ====
- Maharana Shri Wakhat Singh Dalil Singh, Raja of Lunavada.
- John Ware Edgar CSI Bengal Civil Service, Chief Secretary to the Government of Bengal.
- Sir Henry Mortimer Durand, Anglo-Indian diplomat and member of the Indian Civil Service.
- William Markby

==== Companion (CIE) ====
- Maj. Charles Henry Ellison Adamson, Madras Staff Corps, Deputy Commissioner, Burma.
- William Henry Bliss, Madras Civil Service, Member of the Board of Revenue and Commissioner of Salt and Abkari and Separate Revenue.
- John Walker Buyers, Superintending Engineer, Public Works Department (Railway Branch), Government of India.
- Khalifa Syed Mahomed Hassan, Prime Minister of Patiala.
- Brigade Surgeon Isidore Bernadotte Lyon, Bombay Medical Establishment.
- Naoroji Nusserwanjee Wadia, of Bombay.
