= Thales (disambiguation) =

Thales of Miletus was a Greek philosopher.

Thales may also refer to:

== People ==
- Thaletas or Thales of Crete, ancient Greek musician and poet
- Thales (painter), ancient Greek painter from Sicyon
- Thales Fielding (1793–1837), English watercolour painter
- Thales Hoss (born 1989), Brazilian volleyball player
- Thales Lira (born 1993), Brazilian footballer
- Thales Leites Lourenço (born 1981), Brazilian retired mixed martial artist
- Thales McReynolds (1943–1988), American basketball player
- Thales (footballer, born 1994), Brazilian football fullback Thales Bento Oleque
- Thales Paula (born 2001), Brazilian football midfielder
- Thales Pease (1835–1919), British Army and Navy ordnance officer

== Other uses ==
- Thales Group, a France-based engineering and electronics company
- Thales Academy, a network of private schools in North Carolina, United States
- 6001 Thales, a main-belt asteroid
- Thales (crater), a crater on the Moon

== See also ==
- Thales' theorem, in geometry: angle in a semicircle is 90°
- Thales' theorem, in geometry, concerning ratios of line segments (not to be confused with the above); usually referred to as the Intercept theorem
- Thale (disambiguation)
- Thalys, European train service
