= John Ware Edgar =

British colonial administrator (1839–1902)

Sir John Ware Edgar KCIE CSI
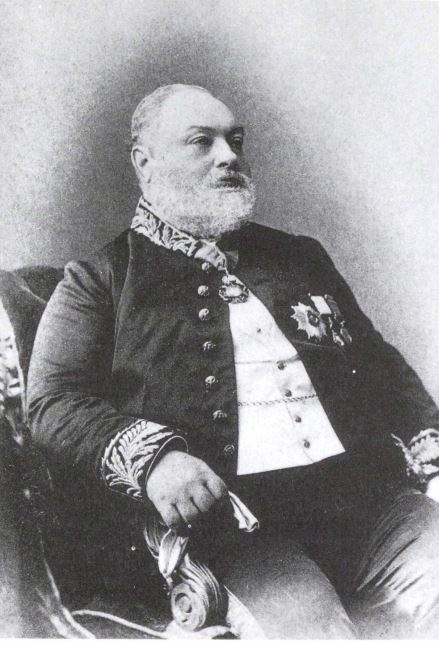
- John Ware Edgar – Post Lushai Expedition
- Born: 16 September 1839; Kensington, London
- Died: 4 June 1902 (aged 62); Montughi, Florence, Italy
- Occupations: Deputy Commissioner of Cachar; Chief Secretary of the Bengal Government
- Years active: 1862–1892
- Organization: Bengal Staff Corps
- Parent(s): John Peard Edgar (Father); Jane Edgar (b. Gibbings, Mother)
- Awards: Knight Commander of the Indian Empire; Companion of the Order of the Star of India
- Military career
- Conflicts: Lushai Expedition (1869); Lushai Expedition

Sir John Ware Edgar KCIE CSI (16 September 1839 – 4 June 1902) was a British colonial administrator in British India. He was Cachar's deputy-commissioner and held significant relations with the sovereign Lushai chiefdoms. He led the failed Lushai Expedition (1869) and participated in the Lushai Expedition.

== Early life and education ==
Edgar was born in 1839, the son of John Peard Edgar, Kensington and Jane Gibbings, daughter of B. Gibbings. John Edgar graduated at 20 in 1860 from a private school after taking an exam for the Indian Civil Service and amassing 1,617 points.

== Early career ==
He joined the Bengal Civil Service in 1862 and served as an assistant magistrate and collector in Bengal and as deputy-commissioner in Assam until 1871. Edgar originally served under the Commissioner of Dacca, the 15th division of Bengal. Edgar's interest in studying the issues of the Bengal frontier prompted Alexander Mackenzie to appoint Edgar as deputy commissioner of Cachar. As deputy commissioner of Cachar, Edgar held the positions of district magistrate and collector, civil judge of the district and the highest local police officer. The responsibility also placed Edgar in proximity with the Lushai chiefdoms. On 14 November 1867, Edgar reached Dudpatil, the official residence of the deputy commissioner of Cachar, with an escort of advanced guards. Edgar met with Major R. Stewart and formally took over the role he was assigned from Stewart.

=== Development of Silchar ===
Silchar was founded by David Scott as a military encampment at Jhalupura as an Assam Rifles camp. This military post lead to the development of an urban settlement as a result. Administrative work before Silchar would occur in Dudhpatil, on the north bank of the Barak River. When Edgar became Deputy Commissioner of Cachar, Silchar was the only tow. It was smaller than Gauhati, Tezpur, and many others. Silchar had no municipal development or institutions with the exception of a police force. The lack of water infrastructure rapidly spread cholera.

The Silchar government school was established in 1863 under Reverend William Pryse of the Welsh Presbyterian Mission Church. In 1866 the schoolwas placed under the control and supervision of the Inspector of schools. This led to a positive relationship with the headmaster A.C. Bhattacharjee, Under Edgar, A public works department was established in Cachar in 1868. Road construction committee was formed with Edgar headed as president. In a comparative survey in 1865, Edgar saw the population of Dacca to be 152,000 compared to 5000 in Silchar. Edgar is further credited with the establishment of the Fatak Bazaar of Silchar which was once the biggest shopping centre in South Assam. Edgar became a patron to several traders and businesses including granting liberal settlement grants. This policy attracted many Bengalis from Sylhet and Dacca and even some Marwari merchants. The Silchar bazaar became known as John Edgar Ganj which was shorted to Jhaniganj. This was due to the traders and merchants appreciating Edgar's generous welfare policies.

Edgar frequently visited traders, merchants, the government school and met with Lushai delegates. The first building in Silchar town built by Edgar was the Chief Judicial magistrate's court which was built with modern construction instead of improvised housing. Edgar requested the magistrate of Sylhet to send more masons to continue the building of new establishments in Silchar. Muslim masons worked in Siclhar and laid bricks on the outskirt of the town in Khasi land which became Itkhola. To meet the demand of drinking water among a growing population, three public tanks and a well was dug by the administration. A hospital for tea-planters was also upgraded by Edgar. When Sukpilal was sick and dying, Edgar sent a doctor to the Lushai Hills, but the difficult unmapped terrain prevented an effective timely response ultimately leading to his death in 1881.

Edgar set up a ferry on the Barak river at Tarapur in 1868. This was due to the issues of individuals crossing between Dudpatil and Silchar. The ferry would be owned under the public works department. The grateful settlers named the ferry ghat as Edgar Ghat before it was later renamed to Annapurna. As a result, the Chief Commissioner's bungalow and Chief Judicial magistrates court became established in Silchar, as did other institutions. Edgar is credited with the development of Silchar as a frontier settlement against the Lushai Hills and headquarters of the Surma Valley Division of Assam.

Silchar grew in reputation as a tea estate town under Edgar. In the Indian 1971 census, Silchar became the largest tea exporter statistically as a result of Edgar's developments a hundred years later. However, the unchecked immigration led to an influx of Bengalis from Dacca and Sylhet. Edgar favoured commercial enterprise entrepeuners. The preference for foreign talent and entrepeuners is argued to have led the indigenous Cachar people to become educationally and culturally backwards and mistrusting of the merchants. As a result many Cachar people did not migrate to Silchar even after Edgar's leave. Chatterjee argues that Edgar contributed to the erasure and obfuscation of the ethnic and native identity of the Cachar people. In pursuit of economic growth and development, the policies of Edgar sacrificed the social fabric of Cachar before unchecked immigration. Edgar had also reversed Stewart's policy of helping and aiding displaced and distressed Burmese. He considered them indolent and lacked compassion for their predicaments. Edgar also pushed out tribals such as Kukis and Nagas to the borders of Cachar and occupied territory of forest and wastelands.

The rise of wealthy landowning gentry in Edgar's administration differed from the zamindar in other areas such as Sylhet. The landowners were conservative and loyal to Edgar but were uneducated. A majority of this genty belonged to the Muslim community in Silchar. The Sonai and Dhulai valleys which were kuki owned and barren became the rice bowl of Cachar unde the new immigrant labourers. Using the Revenue Settlement rules 1859, Edgar controlled the brigands, drunken brawls and criminals into a stable secured feudal society. The growth rate of farm produce increased significantly under his rule. Cachar became subsistent in feeding its population while being able to export excess harvest to other tea estates and the army commissariat. This removed the dependence on imported rice for both institutions.

=== Tea Estates ===
Edgar studied political economy and was interested in the development of the tea industry in Bengal and Assam. He patronized the tea magnates in their programme of expanding trade relations. Edgar's survey of the tea industry was considered so accurate it was still sourced as research in studies on the Indian tea economy. During his rule as Deputy-Commissioner of Cachar, the expansion of tea estates was considered steady which eventually reached the borders of the Lushai Hills. The Lushais considered the tea estates to be encroachments on their hunting grounds and sovereignty. The Lushais committed frequent raids upon the tea estates causing death and concern to the tea businessmen. Edgar's bid to resolve the issue would lead him to enter deepening relations with the Lushai frontier and its inhabitants.

The wasteland rules 1838, provided tea planters with adequate land. This also delegated the deputy commissioner to import labour form outside their jurisdiction. Local labour was scarce due to the nature of low wages. Labour protection laws were however still enforced on imported tea estate workers. They were allowed the right of appeal to the superintendent for justice. The Bengal Government passed the Native Labour Act 1863 to saeize labour recruits through agents before it was amended in 1870. During the period of this policy Edgar used it opportunistically. Edgar opened the tea estates to the tea barons in Calcutta and the natives who could afford capital to participate in the industry. With his influence, Edgar managed to secure a few Bengali Zamindars of Sylhet to invest their wealth into purchasing tea estates. However a majority of these owners would be Europeans and they typically obstructed Edgar's policies. Despite this, European tea estate owners invested in Indian capital, with some coming from England. Vast territories of Cachar's wastelands such as the southern portion of the district were leased to different extensive tea estates on a nominal rent rate. As the areas were covered with forests, tea estate owners transformed these excess areas into timber resources or settled agricultural cultivators. However, the tea estates were on the borders of the Lushai Hills which were inhabited by various Lushai tribes that used these as hunting grounds. The border issues led to Edgar ordering strict vigilance and often inflicting punishment on wrongdoers. Edgar attempted to change his policy by reconciliation with influential chiefs such as Sukpilal but to no avail.

Edgar provided the necessary infrastructure to the tea industry in Cachar to facilitate its rapid growth and expansion. The roads previously built by Edgar assisted him in the movement of goods, capital and produce. Planters were permitted to construct and maintain their own roads as private property without government interference to further encourage infrastructure. Edgar's lassiez faire policies of the tea industry inevitably led to exploitation. Medical facilities for tea estate workers were scarce, and wages became extremely low. However, Edgar made no effort to reverse the negative impact of his policies. The Labour Act of 1873 amended various provisions which only allowed the government as the sole authority to deal with runaway workers of the tea gardens. However, Edgar rarely moved to help labourers in distress but utilised several redressal options in the law instead.

== Anglo-Lushai relations ==
=== Lushai Expedition (1869) ===
The British government had chosen a policy of conciliation with the Lushai tribes, but this would be challenged by Suakpuilala. Suakpuilala had cooperated with a Manipuri rajputra named Kanai Singh. They had jointly invaded the Monierkhal tea estate. Kanai Singh took the loot and Suakpuilala took the captives. Edgar advocated for a strong military response. The cooperation with Kanai Singh and breach of trust by raiding was a blow to Anglo-Lushai relations. The cold season was considered inconvenint by the authorities in Fort William. Dr Brown, the political officer of Manipur, was simply ordered to check Kanai Singh's advances but not engage in violence. Edgar was zealous for a punitive expedition and believed that this would be effective in subjugating the Lushais from making daring raids in British territory. The King of Manipur supported Edgar but Brown refused to leave Manipur on account that his absence would destabnnilize the region. This is said to have infuriated Edgar.

Edgar headed the eastern column of the three columns with William Frost Nuthall and Baker leading the others. Edgar would lead his column with great difficulty to Bazarghat on 12 March 1869. He met with the upas of Vonpilal whose mother was ready to make amends for the British after being mistaken to responsible for a raid done by Poiboi. As the season came to an end Edgar turned his column back to Cachar. The column under Baker arrived at Sukpilal's encampment near the settlement of his sister of Banaitangi who defeated a few skirmishers. However due to Nuthall's sickness and difficult terrain and weather issues, the column was not reinforced and turned back.

The expedition was a failure after several issues had arisen. The country was not known well and bad weather and wilderness had hampered travelling of the columns. The authorities at Fort William utilised the expedition to prepare for future expeditions with more organisation and cooperation.

=== Edgar's tour of the Lushai Hills ===
Edgar followed in the steps of Thomas Herbert Lewin and learnt the Lushai language and customs. Edgar began to use this to influence the policy of the British government according to the Lushais. In the cold season of 1870–1871 Edgar made an extensive tour of the hills. He authored a detailed report of the history, relations and local history retold by the hill people. He also used the information to recreate maps and locations of settlements and chiefs. Through Edgar, the British recorded Lallula as the forefather of the principal Sailo chiefs. His report detailed how Lallula spread Sailo influence and pushed out the previous Kuki inhabitants into the British territories such as Chittagong, Manipur and Cachar. It explored the Sailo chiefs as a royal family connected by blood relations. This report differentiated the Lushais from the Kukis. As a result the British nomenclature of "Lushai-Kuki" became obsolete.

Edgar utilised Punchangkai, a village in the Sonai valley as the encampment where he would communicate via emissaries with the Lushai chiefs such as Lalbura and Suakpuilala. His mastery of the Lushai language made him meet many of the chiefs in person and assert personal influence. He took the tour with Hari Charan Sharma who also spoke Lushai.

=== Sukpilal's sunnad ===
Edgar followed a policy of conciliation with the Lushais adapted by Lord Canning. The British believed the Lushai chiefs would be brought within control by offering gifts and deepening relations of mutual benefit. After the death of Chief Munjihow of Cachar, Edgar decided to enter relations with Sukpilal. Sukpilal was the uncontested influential chiefs of the Western Lushai Hills which was advantageous to Edgar. During the tour, on 14 January 1871, Edgar visited Sukpilal with Hari Charan Sharma to convince him of the need of a demarcated boundary that both sides can agree on. He explained the concept of a sunnad. Sukpilal agreed to Edgar's negotiations and this established the famous Sukpilal sunnad of 1870. Sukpilal would take the Bairabi Chura near the Tlawng River. The agreement furthermore included a clause that Sukpilal and his people would not attack Cachar or Sylhet. Any disputes with the boundary would be taken to Dudpatil, Cachar first, where a British officer would meet with the upas. The Sunnad granted Cachar a proper border which has largely continued today with a few minor adjustments. This also opened relations with the Lushai chiefs who now were willing to approach the British to settle disputes as opposed to raiding the tea estates. Trade marts and bazaars were established at Changsil and Sonai to encourage trade of the Lushais with the merchants in the plains and valleys. Edgar's policy was initially successful as a result. However Sukpilal would abuse this trust as he would commit raids. The reasoning for his raids were attributed to Lushai custom of providing bawis (slaves) to a woman when entering her new home upon marriage. In this case, Sukpilal's sister Banaitangi was being married to Murchuilal which necessated this action.

Edgar's tour and conciliation was criticised by English newspapers such as the Observer and Pioneer. Edgar's sunnad invoked a truce between Sukpilal and the British. For future expeditions the neutrality of Sukpilal would be important to succeed in British objectives. Sukpilal was the undisputed chief of the western Lushai Hills. Edgar's detailed tour report is listed in the appendix of Mackenzie's 1884 publication on the relations of the government with the northeast frontier.

=== Lushai Expedition ===
During his tour a series of border raids occurred under the chiefs. The raids had occurred in Cachar, Suylhet and Chittagong. Chief Bengkhuaia invaded Alexandrapur and took Mary Winchester (Zoluti) captive. Chief Lalbura would invade Monierkhal. This outrage by the European settlers in India and the government led to a decision to abandon the policy of conciliation. Sir William Grey proposed a punitive expedition into the Lushai Hills. Edgar followed suit and sent a memorandum to the British government in Bengal advocating for another military response to the Lushais.

The beginning of the Lushai Expedition required officers with sufficient knowledge on the nature of the Lushai Hills. Edgar was assigned civil officer to the Cachar (Right) Column under Bourchier. His task was to compile and gather information of a political, economic, administrative or scientific nature. After the expedition Edgar submitted another detailed report on the geography, Lushai customs, flora, fauna and topography. The report became a leading source and reference for administrative and military officials in the eastern frontier. Edgar was awarded a Companion of the Order of the Star of India (CSI) in the 1873 Birthday Honours.

At the end of the expedition, Edgar submitted a report on 2 April 1872. His report outlined that before the British annexation of Cachar and influence in Tripura, the local kings had little to no ability to repel the raids and punish the tribes. As a result, the Barak Valley and surrounding borders became depopulated from repeated Lushai raids. Edgar criticised the European soldiers in the expedition and their lack of knowledge and familiarity with the Lushai Hills. As a result the policy changed to supplement Cachari soldiers and Gurkhas instead. He further outlined his dissatisfaction with the removal of William McCulloch. McCulloch had been transferred out of Manipur in 1867 and replaced by Dr. Browne, who was described as an inexperienced civil assistant surgeon lacking fine insight into Manipuri affairs. Brown's weak administration was blamed for the resurgence in raids and violence. The report ends with advice on using the Kukis pushed out of the Lushai Hills as a levy to guard the frontier and check on the Lushais.

=== 1880 Lushai famine ===
After the cycle of mautam struck the Lushai Hills once more it was estimated half the population died of starvation along with pestilence and disease turning fatal from malnutrition. The governments of Assam and Bengal decided to aid the Lushais wth emergency food and rice. The relief operations saw food transported to the Changsil and Kasalong bazaars via river. Edgar was the commissioner of Chittagong and the chief secretary of Bengal. Edgar opposed giving food aid to the Lushais. Edgar described the Lushais as being in want of zu rather than in want of rice and to roll back the amount of food being given. Edgar even chastised Hari Charan Sharma who was in charge of famine relief operations in the Hills.

== Later years ==
Following further district work he became Commissioner of Chittagong in late 1885. Two years later he was appointed Financial and Chief Secretary to the Government of Bengal, serving as such until 1892. For some months before his retirement that year, he also occupied a seat as an additional member of the Viceroy's Executive Council. He was knighted as a Knight Commander of the Order of the Indian Empire (KCIE) in the 1889 Birthday Honours list.

In later years he devoted his time to historical studies. He particularly studied in the history of Northern Buddhism and modern Latin Christianity.

He died at his residence, the villa Guicciardini in Florence, on 4 June 1902.

== Sources ==
=== Books ===
- Chatterjee, Suhas (1985). British rule in Mizoram. New Delhi: Mittal Publications.
- Chatterjee, Suhas (1990). Mizo Encyclopaedia. Aizawl: Jaico Publishing House.
- Mackenzie, Alexander (1884). History of the Relations of the government with the Hill Tribes of the North-East Frontier of Bengal. Calcutta: Home Department Press.
- Woodthorpe, Robert Gosset (1873), The Lushai expedition, 1871–1872, London: Hurst and Blackett
- Chatterjee, Suhas (2009). Frontier Officers in Colonial Northeast India. New Delhi: Akansha Publishing. ISBN 978-81-8370-168-6.

=== News ===
- Morning Post (22 August 1860). "Civil Service of India". Morning Post. No. 27045. London: Morning Post.
- Nottingham Evening Post (25 May 1889). "The Queen's Birthday". Nottingham Evening Post. No. 3370. Nottingham: Nottingham Evening Post. p. 3.
- Paris Correspondent (12 June 1902). "Obituary". The Times. No. 36792. London: The Times. p. 12.

Government offices
Preceded by	Commissioner of Chittagong; 1885–1887	Succeeded by
Preceded by	Chief Secretary to the Government of Bengal; 1887–1891	Succeeded by
