= Lushai Expedition (1869) =

Abortive punitive expedition against Suakpuilala

Lushai Expedition of 1869
Date	February 1869
Location	Lushai Hills
Result	Aborted Expedition

Belligerents
(British Raj) British Raj; United Kingdom	Lushai chiefdoms

Commanders and leaders
(British Raj) John Ware Edgar (British Raj) William Frost Nuthall (British Raj) Chandrakirti Singh	Suakpuilala; Kanai Singh

The Lushai Expedition of 1869 was an abortive punitive expedition against Lushai chief called Suakpuilala and a Manipur prince Kanai Singh, based in the Lushai Hills (present day Mizoram) in the Indo-Burman Ranges. The expedition was arranged by John Edgar, the deputy commissioner of Cachar, and led by Colonel Nuthall. Factors such as weather, unpreparedness and diplomatic overtures led to the retreat and failure of the expedition.

== Background ==
Kanai Singh, a prince of Manipur had taken refuge among the tribes at the Cachar border and made an attempt to seize the throne of Manipur. Local authorities had suspected that Suakpuilala had been aiding Kanai Singh in this endeavour. In 1869 a series of raids were committed by Lushai tribes on Cachar and Sylhet. Suakpuilala was assumed by the British to be complicit in the raids. This was suspected due to Suakpuilala wishing to divert forces from Manipur to aid Kanai Singh.

An increase in raids had also alerted British authorities. In November 1868, reports of Lushai attacks on Naga villages were made. In December, the magistrate of Sylhet reported that Lushais raided a village near Adampore. Suakpuilala also raided a settlement under a chief named Rungbhoom in Hill Tipperah. As a result, Rungbhoom fled to Sylhet.

British suspicions were confirmed when Kanai Singh and Suakpuilala jointly raided the tea estates of Monierkhal at Cachar in January 1869. Kanai Singh looted the money while Suakpuilala's war party took several captives. The raid was followed by a raid on the tea estate of Nowarbund on 10 January 1869 by Lalruma, brother-in-law of Vanpuilala. Closely afterwards, Doṭhiauva, the son of Vanhnuailiana, would raid Monierkhal on 14 January. A police guard and stockade were destroyed before the tea estate was looted. The British authorities reconsidered their stance on the policy of conciliation with Lushai chiefs and decided on an alternative policy. The British also implicated Vanpuilala in responsibility for the events.

== Forward Policy ==
Authorities at Fort William took the stance of punishing Kanai Singh and the Lushai raiders. Robert Brown, the political agent of Manipur, was directed to advance with a contingent to check on Kanai Singh but not to use unnecessary violence. The commissioner of Dacca supported Brown to capture Kanai Singh. The government ordered that all possible punishment should be made upon chiefs who refuse to submit and or surrender the captives of the raids.

John Edgar, the deputy commissioner of Cachar, advocated a punitive expedition. He informed the authorities in the Government of Bengal of his plan to start from Silchar to Sonai to arrest Kanai Singh. Edgar also outlined Brown's hesitation and unwillingness to participate in the expedition. However, the Raja of Manipur, Chandrakirti Singh, aided Edgar with a 1000-man regiment on 2 February 1869.

Edgar continued to fight for a stronger response from the government. The cold season was about to end and authorities in Fort William did not consider large-scale military operations at such a time to be convenient. Brown withdrew his participation by citing the possibility that removing himself from the capital would create panic among the Manipuris. Colonel Nuthall was supplied with a force consisting of the Sylhet Light Infantry, the 7th Native Infantry, a Eurasian battery and strong detachments of the Cachar Frontier Police.

Three columns were established for the expedition of 1869. The West Dhaleswari Column was headed by William Frost Nuthall, the East Cachar Column was headed by Edgar and Major Stevenson, and the Sylhet Column was headed by Mr Kimberly and Mr Baker. The forces set out in late February. Edgar's column surmounted many difficulties before reaching Bazarghat on 12 March 1869. The ministers (upas) of Vanpuilala reported to Edgar of Vanpuilala's death and that his mother Impanee would make amends with the British. The upas also voiced concerns about Edgar's posturing when they were not responsible for raiding. The truth was that Suakpuilala was responsible for the attack on the Sylhet border, while the raids at Nowarbund and Monierkhal were attributed to the true perpetrators, Lalruma and Doṭhiauva, respectively. The raid in Manipur was attributed to Pâwibâwia instead of Vanpuilala. Since Vanpuilala's tribe was not responsible or hostile, Edgar realized the season was coming to an end, which would not allow the column to travel to distant tribes anymore, encouraging a retreat. Before doing so, Edgar decided to make a show of force at Impanee's village. An agreement was reached with the upas of Impanee, and a promise was made to restore captives and refugees. Chatterjee argues that Edgar also retreated on account of realising the mistake of using unnecessary force on innocent chiefs. He returned to Silchar with his column.

Nuthall commanded his column to advance along the Dhaleswari River. From 26 January to 3 February, heavy rains followed, affecting the feasibility of traversing the Lushai Hills. The route became impractical after the week long rain. Nuthall's column was heavily affected by terrain changes from the heavy rain. The inconvenience greatly halted progress and failed to reach the Sylhet Column under Kimble. Kimble's Column rapidly advanced through the Lushai Hills and located Suakpuilala's settlement. Along the way, the party encountered Rangboon's old settlement. The settlement had been burned down, with eleven skeletons piled in one spot. They navigated along the border of Hill Tipperah to Koilashur. The party visited Rangboom's village before travelling further. Kemble arrived at camp within sight of Suakpuilala and Banaitangi's settlement on 16 March. The party decided to wait one day on Nuthall to arrive. They tasked the force with procuring food as supplies had dwindled. On 17 March 1869, the column defeated some Lushai warriors from Suakpuilala's settlement. Baker and Kimble retreated their force as no sign of Nuthall's force was arriving to reinforce their position. A telegram on 21 March confirmed Nuthall's retreat.

The Manipur contingent was prevented from accomplishing anything due to the stress of the weather.

== Conclusion of the expedition ==
The expedition's failure led to a few key realizations of the British authorities. The Lushai Hills was not properly mapped, and the unknown nature of its terrain was responsible for the failure. The columns lacked any form of communication between each other to coordinate their operations. The last point was that the expedition was undertaken in the wrong season. Furthermore, sickness among troops was common and factored in as a contribution to the failure. These lessons would contribute to the success of the Lushai Expedition of 1871. However, both Suakpuilala and Kanai Singh were left unpunished. Baker's experience in his column did record several new discoveries of the geography of the Lushai Hills. Baker would also form an advisory document on any future expeditions to be undertaken on the Lushai Hills.

Sir W Grey argued that unless the Lushai Hills were occupied with a garrison and permanent force, the Lushai chiefs would not cease raiding British estates and subjects. He cited the historical example of the Naga and Garo Hills political officers. However, the government of India objected to a renewal of active military operations against the Lushai chiefs. Lord Mayo, in a meeting with W Grey declared that no military expeditions against the Lushais would be undertaken and that British subjects on the frontier would be strengthened and fortified with outposts and arming the settlements with weapons for self-defence.

== See also ==
- Lushai Expedition
- Chin-Lushai Expedition
- Lushai Rising
- Suakpuilala

== Sources ==
- Chatterjee, Suhas (1985). British rule in Mizoram. New Delhi: Mittal Publications.
- Mackenzie, Alexander (1884). History of the Relations of the government with the Hill Tribes of the North-East Frontier of Bengal. Calcutta: Home Department Press.
- Shakespear, L.W (1929). History of the Assam Rifles. London: Macmillan and Co, Limited.
- Chatterjee, Suhas (1990). Mizo Encyclopaedia. Aizawl: Jaico Publishing House.
- Woodthorpe, Robert Gosset (1873), The Lushai expedition, 1871-1872, London: Hurst and Blackett
