= Provis =

Provis is a surname. Notable people with the surname include:

- Arthur Provis (born 1925), British cinematographer and producer
- George Provis (1908–1989), British art director
- Nicole Bradtke (née Provis) (born 1969), Australian tennis player
- Samuel Butler Provis (1845–1926), British civil servant
