= George Ryder =

George Ryder may refer to:

- George Lisle Ryder (1838–1905), British civil servant
- George Ryder Stakes
- George Ryder, character in The Listener
- George Ryder (footballer) for Durban City F.C.
