= George Hussey (mayor) =

Lieutenant-Colonel Sir George Alfred Ernest Hussey (14 December 1864 – 20 August 1950) was a British brewer, volunteer officer and local politician who served as mayor of Southampton 1899–1901.

== Biography ==
Hussey was born at Southampton in 1864, the son of George Hussey, by Mary Bush, daughter of Thomas Bush, of Hinton Charterhouse, Somerset. He was educated at Cranleigh School. In 1881 he entered a firm of brewers, and eight years later he bought a brewery in Southampton.

He was elected a councillor of the borough of Southampton in 1892, an Alderman in 1898, and served three terms as mayor of the city 1899–1901. He later received the Freedom of the borough of Southampton, and continued to be active in local politics, serving as chairman of the Southampton Conservative Association.

His years as mayor coincided with the Second Boer War in South Africa (1899–1902), and he was thus responsible for the city with the port where a major part of the troops would go out or return home. He also raised an Ambulance corps to help in the war. For his services as mayor he was appointed a Knight Bachelor in the November 1901 Birthday Honours list, and received the knighthood from King Edward VII on 10 December 1901.

Hussey was an officer in the Volunteer Force, Hampshire Regiment. He was appointed a major of the 2nd Volunteer Battalion of the regiment on 14 February 1900, and lieutenant-colonel commanding the Battalion on 4 February 1907. In April the following year the 2nd Volunteer Battalion was amalgamated into the 5th Battalion when the Volunteer Force became the Territorial Force, and he continued in command of the battalion until 1912. On 13 March 1912 he retired from the Regiment, and the following July he was appointed a lieutenant-colonel of the Territorial Force Reserve.

In later life he was a Master of the Worshipful Company of Distillers in 1921.

== Family ==
Hussey married first, in 1885, Mary Ann Rachel Read (died 29 January 1906), daughter of William Read, of Acoecks Green, Worcestershire. After her death he remarried, in 1912, Melville Laurie (died 1942), daughter of Thomas Laurie, of Kirkcudbright. He married a third time, in 1944, Christine Leathes, daughter of Robert Leathes, of Gateshead, Durham.

He died at Surbiton, Surrey, on 20 August 1950.
