= Ernest Edward Blake =

British colonial official

Sir Ernest Blake KCMG

Crown Agent for the Colonies
- In office 1881–1909

Personal details
- Born: 1845
- Died: 30 November 1920 (aged 74–75)

Sir Ernest Edward Blake KCMG (1845 – 30 November 1920) was a British colonial official who was Crown Agent for the Colonies from 1881 until 1909.

== Biography ==
Blake was born in 1845, the son of Rev. Edmund Blake, rector of Bramerton, Norfolk, and was educated at Norwich grammar school.

He entered the Colonial Office in 1863, passing at the head of the list. In 1872 he became Assistant Private Secretary to Lord Kimberley, Secretary of State for the Colonies, and in 1874 he was briefly Private Secretary until the change of administration. Blake advanced to the position of 1st class Clerk and Head of the General Department in 1879.

In 1881 he left the Colonial office to become a Crown Agent for the Colonies, in which position he stayed until he retired in May 1909. Crown agents reported to the Crown Agency Office in London, an office which served as the sole official British commercial and financial agent of all British protectorates and Crown colonies. The Colonial Office enforced a policy of sole usage of crown agencies for all purchases of goods for government use, creating a virtual monopoly over government retail supply within the colonies of the British Empire. The Crown Agencies also became financial institutions, supplying capital, routes for investment, and pensions to all public works and government in British dependent colonies (excluding such Dominions as Canada or Australia). Crown Agencies were the bodies responsible for all large projects such as railway or harbour construction throughout British Africa, India, and the West Indies.

Blake was for several years a director of the London Assurance Company, but had to resign following a debate in the Parliament in 1904. Civil servants could normally not hold such directorships, and though Crown Agents were not technically civil servants, the Colonial Secretary Alfred Lyttelton clarified in a debate in July 1904 that such rules would also apply to them.

Blake was appointed a Knight Commander of the Order of St Michael and St George (KCMG) in the 1901 Birthday Honours list on 9 November 1901, and invested as such by King Edward VII at St James's Palace on 17 December 1901.

He lived at Hawkshill, Leatherhead, in Surrey, but moved to Woolcombe St Mary’s, Uplyme, Devon in 1920, dying later the same year, on 30 Nov. 1920.

== Family ==
Blake married, in 1874, Catharine Isabella Blyth, daughter of Alfred Blyth. Lady Blake died at Hawkshill on 22 October 1902. They had two sons (including Ernest Stephen Blake) and one daughter.
