= 1901 Birthday Honours =

National awards given by King Edward VII

The King's Birthday Honours 1901 were announced 9 November 1901, the birthday of the new monarch Edward VII. The list included appointments to various orders and honours of the United Kingdom and British India.

The list was published in The Times 9 November 1901, and the various honours were gazetted in The London Gazette 9 November 1901, 12 November 1901, and 15 November 1901.

The recipients of honours are displayed or referred to as they were styled before their new honour and arranged by honour and where appropriate by rank (Knight Grand Cross, Knight Commander etc.) then division (Military, Civil).

== Privy Council ==
- The Duke of Buccleuch, KG, KT
- Sir Henry Fletcher, Baronet, CB, Member of Parliament (MP)
- Sir John Winfield Bonser, Chief Justice of the Supreme Court, Ceylon

== Baronet ==
- Alderman Frank Green, the Right Honourable the Lord Mayor of London

== Knight Bachelor ==
- George Bullough, Esq.
- George Anderson Critchett, Esq., FRCS
- George Hussey, Esq., Mayor of Southampton
- Ernest Spencer, Esq., MP
- George Gough Arbuthnot, Esq., of Madras
- Samuel Brownlow Gray, Esq., Chief Justice of Bermuda
- Archibald Campbell Lawrie, Esq., on retirement as Senior Puisne Justice of the Supreme Court, Ceylon
- Joseph Ignatius Little, Esq., Chief Justice, Newfoundland

== The Most Honourable Order of the Bath ==
=== Knight Grand Cross of the Order of the Bath (GCB) ===
Civil Division

- Sir Francis Richard Plunkett, GCMG, His Majesty's Ambassador at Vienna

=== Knights Commander of the Order of the Bath (KCB) ===
Civil Division

- Sir Montagu Ommanney, KCMG, Under Secretary of State for the Colonies
- Robert Anderson, Esq, CB, LLD, late Assistant Commissioner of Police
- Francis Hopwood, Esq., CB, CMG, Permanent Secretary, Board of Trade
- Samuel Butler Provis, Esq., CB, Permanent Secretary, Local Government Board
- George Lisle Ryder, Esq., CB, Chairman of the Board of Customs

Military Division

- Admiral George Digby Morant
- Vice-Admiral Charles George Fane
- Colonel Thales Pease, CB

=== Companions of the Order of the Bath (CB) ===
Civil division

- Clinton Edward Dawkins, Esq.
- Major-General Constantine Phipps Carey, RE, Chief Engineer, Local Government Board
- Colonel Moreton John Wheatley, RE, Bailiff of the Royal Parks
- David Parry Williams, Esq., Collector of Customs, Liverpool

== Order of the Star of India ==
=== Knight Commander of the Order of the Star of India (KCSI) ===
- James John Digges La Touche, Esq., CSI, Indian Civil Service
- Raja Surindar Bikram Prakash Bahadur, of Sirmur
- Sultan Ahmed bin Fadthl, of Lahej

=== Companion of the Order of the Star of india (CSI) ===
- Stanley Ismay, Esq., Indian Civil Service
- David Thomas Roberts, Esq., Indian Civil Service
- James Wilson, Esq., Indian Civil Service
- Robert Burton Buckley, Esq., Chief Engineer and Secretary to the Government of Bengal in the Public Works Department
- Arthur Frederick Cox, Esq., Indian Civil Service
- Charles Gerwien Bayne, Esq., Indian Civil Service

== Order of Saint Michael and Saint George ==
=== Knight Grand Cross of the Order of St Michael and St George (GCMG) ===
- Sir Giuseppe Carbone, KCMG, LLD, Chief Justice, President of the Court of Appeal, and Vice-President of the Council of Government of the Island of Malta
- Sir Henry Hamilton Johnston, KCB, lately His Majesty's Special Commissioner, Commander-in-Chief, and Consul-General for the Uganda Protectorate and the adjoining Territories

=== Knight Commander of the Order of St Michael and St George (KCMG) ===
- Ernest Edward Blake, Esq., one of the Crown Agents for the Colonies
- Alfred Lewis Jones, Esq., President of the Liverpool Chamber of Commerce, in recognition of services to the West African colonies and to Jamaica
- Frederick Robert St John, Esq., on retirement of the post of His Majesty's Envoy Extraordinary and Minister Plenipotentiary at Berne
- Audley Charles Gosling, Esq., on retirement from the post of His Majesty's Envoy Extraordinary and Minister Plenipotentiary at Santiago

=== Companion of the Order of St Michael and St George (CMG) ===
- Commodore Alfred Leigh Winsloe, RN, CVO, in command of His Majesty's ship Ophir during the visit of the Duke and Duchess of Cornwall and York to the Colonies
- Charles Edward Ducat Pennycuick, Esq., on retirement as Treasurer of the Island of Ceylon
- William Robert Henderson, Esq., MD, Principal Medical Officer of the Gold Coast
- Robert Allman, Esq., Principal Medical Officer of Southern Nigeria
- Walter Egerton, Esq., First Magistrate, Singapore, in the Straits Settlements
- John Burchmore Harrison, Esq., MA, Government Analyst of the Colony of British Guiana
- Francois Hodoul, Esq., for many years Unofficial Member of the Legislative Council of the Seychelles Islands
- Henry Blythe Westrap Russell, Esq., in recognition of his services while employed with the Ashanti Field Force
- Albert Charles Wratislaw, Esq., His Majesty's Consul at Basrah
- Brevet Lieutenant-Colonel William Spottiswoode Sparkes, for services in Egypt
- Captain Robert Leonard Sunkersett Arthur (the Rifle Brigade), His Majesty's Consul at Dakar and Colonial Secretary designate of the Gold Coast.
- Lieutenant-Colonel Edward Altham Altham, Deputy-Assistant Adjutant-General, Intelligence Division, War Office, for services to the Foreign Office
- Captain and Brevet Major Herbert Henry Austin, RE, DSO
- Captain and Brevet Major Richard George Tyndal Bright (Rifle Brigade), for services in connection with the recent Expedition to survey the frontier between Abyssinia and the Protectorates of the British East Africa and Uganda

== Order of the Indian Empire ==
=== Knights Grand Commander of the Order of the Indian Empire (GCIE) ===
- General Sir Arthur Power Palmer, KCB, Commander-in-Chief in India
- Maharao Sir Kesri Singh Bahadur, of Sirohi, in Rajputana, KCSI

=== Knights Commander of the Order of the Indian Empire (KCIE) ===
- Nawab Shahbaz Khan, Bugti, of Baluchistan
- James George Scott, Esq., CIE, Deputy Commissioner in Burma
- Raja Jang Bahadur Khan, of Nanpara, in the Bahraich District of Oudh, CIE

=== Companion of the Order of the Indian Empire (CIE) ===
- Thomas Conland, Esq., Barrister-at-Law, Member of the Council of the Lieutenant-Governor of the North-Western Provinces and Oudh for making Laws and Regulations
- Sidney Preston, Esq., Chief Engineer and Secretary to the Government of the Punjab in the Public Works Department, Irrigation Branch
- Murray Hammick, Esq., Indian Civil Service
- Alexander Pedler, Esq., FRS, Director of Public Instruction, Bengal
- Richard Amphlett Lamb, Esq., Indian Civil Service
- William Stevenson Meyer, Esq., Indian Civil Service
- Alexander Lauzun Pendock Tucker, Esq., Indian Civil Service
- Diwan Bahadur Kanchi Krishnaswami Rao, Diwan of the Travancore State
- William Leathem Harvey, Esq., Indian Civil Service
- Lieutenant-Colonel John Clibborn, Indian Staff Corps
- Lieutenant-Colonel George Wingate, Indian Staff Corps
- Lieutenant-Colonel George Hart Desmond Gimlette, MD, Indian Medical Service
- Louis S. Moss, Esq., Agent and Manager of the Madras Railway Company
- Arthur Henry Wallis, Esq., Calcutta
- Alexander Johnstone Dunlop, Esq., Senior Member, Board of Revenue, the Nizam's Government
- George Herbert Dacres Walker, Esq, Under Secretary to the Government of India in the Public Works Department, General Branch
- Major Alexander Fleetwood Pinhey, Indian Staff Corps
- Rai Bahadur Nanak Chand, Minister of the Indore State
- Spencer Harcourt Butler, Esq., Indian Civil Service
- Captain Frank Cooke Webb Were, Indian Staff Corps
- Honorary Major Thomas Henry Hill, lately Senior Assistant-Surgeon, Indian Subordinate Medical Department
- Rai Bahadur Radhika Prasanna Mukharji, lately Inspector of Schools in Bengal

== Kaisar-i-Hind Medal ==
- Sardar Khan Bahadur Mir Abdul Ali, JP, Bombay
- Shankar Madhav Chitnavis, Esq., Deputy-Commissioner, Central Provinces
- Khan Bahadur Dhanjibhai Fakirji Commodore, CIE
- Major Herbert Edward Deane, R.A.M.C.
- Major Thomas Edward Dyson, MB, CM, Indian Medical Service
- Mrs. E. J. Firth, of Madras
- N. S. Glazebrook, Esq., JP, of Bombay
- Sydney Hutton Cooper Hutchinson, Esq., AMICE, Superintendent of Telegraphs
- Colonel Sir Samuel Swinton Jacob, KCIE, Indian Staff Corps
- Harrington Verney Lovett, Esq., Indian Civil Service
- Herbert Frederick Mayes, Esq., Barrister-at-Law, Indian Civil Service
- Lieutenant-Colonel James McCloghry, FRCS, Indian Medical Service
- William Florey Noyce, Esq., Extra-Assistant Commissioner and Assistant Secretary to the Financial Commissioner, Burma
- Rai Bahadur Kameleshwari Pershad Singh of Monghyr, Bengal
- Robert Barton Stewart, Esq., Indian Civil Service
- Captain Edmund Wilkinson, FRCS, Indian Medical Service
