= Herbert Henry Austin =

Brigadier-General Herbert Henry Austin CB CMG DSO
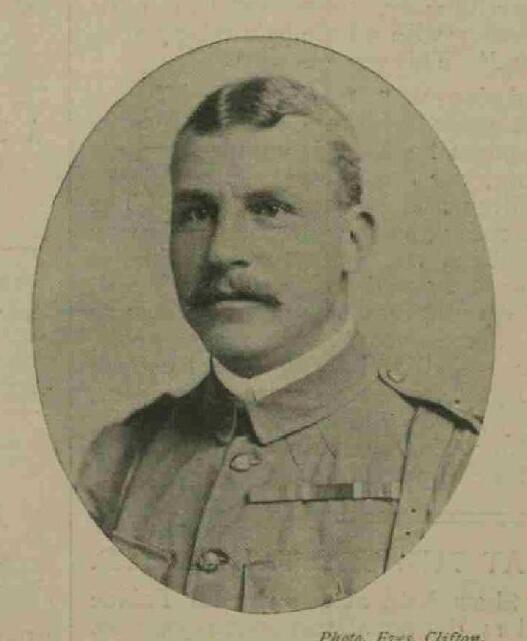
- Born: 1 June 1868
- Died: 27 April 1937 (aged 68)
- Military career
- Allegiance: United Kingdom
- Branch: British Army
- Service years: 1887–1920
- Rank: Brigadier-General
- Conflicts: North-West Frontier; First World War
- Awards: Companion of the Order of the Bath; Companion of the Order of St Michael and St George; Distinguished Service Order; Mentioned in Despatches; Order of the Brilliant Star of Zanzibar; Commander's Cross of the Order of the White Eagle (Serbia)

Brigadier-General Herbert Henry Austin, CB, CMG, DSO (1 June 1868 – 27 April 1937) was a British Army officer, colonial engineering surveyor and author.

== Military career ==
Austin was the second son of Colonel Edmund Austin of the British Indian Army. He was educated at Clifton College and the Royal Military Academy, Woolwich, before commissioning into the Royal Engineers in 1887. He was promoted to lieutenant in 1890. In 1891 he was one of four officers of the Royal Engineers appointed to survey the route of the Uganda Railway under Sir James Macdonald, who he had met while serving on the North-West Frontier. While in Africa he was made a Commander of the Order of the Brilliant Star of Zanzibar and led an expedition to the Omo River. He subsequently served in the Waziristan Expedition of 1894–1895, in operations in Uganda between 1897 and 1898 (for which he was awarded the Distinguished Service Order), and in the Persian Gulf from 1909 to 1910. Austin was made a Companion of the Order of St Michael and St George in the 1901 Birthday Honours for survey expeditions into Abyssinia.

Austin was appointed a General Staff Officer in HQ India in 1914 and was Commandant of Cadet College Quetta the following year. In 1915 Austin was made a brigadier general and served on the General Staff during the First World War. He was awarded the Serbian Order of the White Eagle (3rd class, with swords) in 1916.

== Publications ==
- Among Swamps and Giants in Equatorial Africa (1902)
- With MacDonald in Uganda (1903)
- Korea: Its History, Its People, and Its Commerce (with Angus Hamilton and Masatake Terauchi; 1910)
- Some Rambles of a Sapper (1928)
- Gun-running in the Gulf and other adventures (1926)
