= Edward Altham =

British Army officer

Lieutenant-General Sir Edward Altham KCB KCIE CMG
- Born: 13 April 1856; Wilton, Somerset
- Died: 27 September 1943 (aged 87)
- Military career
- Allegiance: United Kingdom of Great Britain and Ireland
- Branch: British Army
- Service years: 1876–1934
- Rank: Lieutenant-General
- Unit: Royal Scots
- Awards: Knight Commander of the Bath; Knight Commander of the Order of the Indian Empire

Lieutenant-General Sir Edward Altham Altham, KCB, KCIE, CMG (13 April 1856 – 27 September 1943) was a British Army officer who served in the Second Boer War and as a senior intelligence officer during World War I. He was Quartermaster-General in India 1917–1919.

== Biography ==
Altham was born in Wilton, Somerset, in 1856, the second son of Major W. S. Altham, late 83rd Foot, of Timbercombe, Bridgwater, and Henrietta Moulton-Barrett of Hope End, Herefordshire.

He entered the Army in 1876, and was commissioned into Royal Scots, the oldest line infantry regiment in the British Army, and, a lieutenant from 14 September 1881, served in the Bechuanaland Expedition 1884–85 and was promoted to captain on 15 April 1885.

A major from 20 July 1895, he transferred to staff duty and was at the Intelligence Division, War Office, from 1897 to 1899. After the outbreak of the Second Boer War in October that year, he was sent to South Africa, where he served as Assistant Adjutant-General for Intelligence. For his service he was twice mentioned in despatches, received the Queen's Medal with four clasps, and was promoted to lieutenant c colonel. After his return to the United Kingdom in 1900, he passed Staff College, and from 1900 to 1904 was back at the Intelligence Division, where he served as deputy assistant adjutant general and was promoted to colonel on 29 November 1903. He was appointed a Companion of the Order of St Michael and St George (CMG) in the November 1901 Birthday Honours list.

He was placed on half-pay on 1 October 1904 before reverting to active service and being made an AAG on 21 April 1906.

He served on the general staff in South Africa from 1906 to 1908 during which time he was promoted to the temporary rank of brigadier general on 2 January 1907. On 1 April 1908 he was appointed as a brigadier general in charge of administration with Northern Command and was allowed to keep his temporary rank while so employed.

Atham, promoted on 31 August 1910 to major general, served throughout the First World War. He was appointed in charge of Administration, Southern Command, in 1914; then served, commanding the Lines of Communication on Mudros, with conspicuous success, Dardanelles campaign 1915, and in the Egyptian Expeditionary Force 1916. He gave evidence to the Dardanelles Commission of Enquiry. He was appointed Quartermaster-general in India in 1917, serving as such until 1919, and was promoted to the temporary rank of lieutenant general on 24 January 1917 while serving in this assignment.

For his service in the war, he was mentioned in despatches seven times, and promoted to lieutenant-general. He was appointed a Knight Commander of the Order of the Bath (KCB) in 1916, a Knight Commander of the Order of the Indian Empire (KCIE) in 1919, and received the Grand Cross of the Order of the White Eagle from Serbia, and the Grand Cross of the Order of the Sacred Treasure from Japan.

He was colonel of the Royal Scots from 16 October 1918 until 1934.

After his retirement on 18 February 1920 he lived in Winchester, where he was a member of the Winchester Diocesan Board of Finance.

Altham died on 27 September 1943, at the age of 87.

== Family ==
Altham married in 1880 Georgina Emily Nicol, daughter of William Macpherson Nicol of Inverness. They had two sons and one daughter:

- Captain Edward Altham, CB (1882–1950), of the Royal Navy
- Major Harry Surtees Altham, CBE, DSO, MC (1888–1965)
- Dorothy Mary Altham (1883-1969)

Military offices
Preceded by Alfred Bingley	Quartermaster-General in India; 1917–1919	Succeeded by Sir George MacMunn
Honorary titles
Preceded by Lieut-Gen George Hay Moncrieff	Colonel of the Royal Scots (The Royal Regiment); 1918–1934	Succeeded by Major-Gen Granville George Loch
