= Thale (disambiguation) =

Thale may refer to:

- Thale, a city in Germany
- Thale (Verwaltungsgemeinschaft), a "collective municipality" in the district of Harz, in Saxony-Anhalt, Germany
- Thale (film), 2012 Norwegian film

== See also ==
- Thales (disambiguation)
- Thale cress
