= Constantine Phipps Carey =

British Army officer

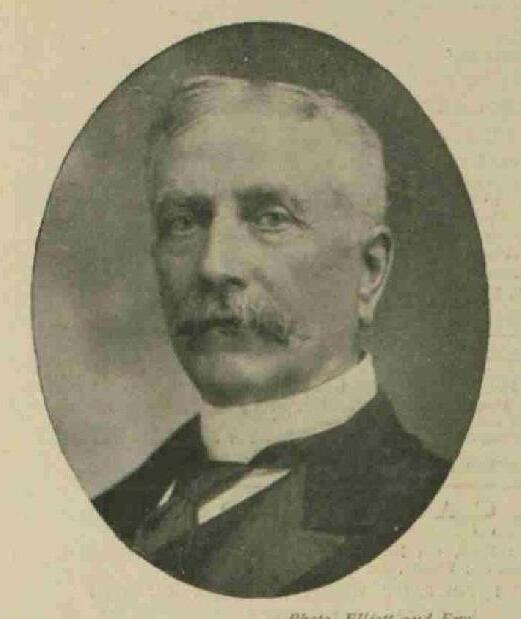
- Born: 29 May 1835; Cape Colony
- Died: 7 December 1906 (aged 71); Marylebone, London
- Military career
- Allegiance: United Kingdom
- Branch: British Army
- Service years: 1854–1882
- Rank: Major-General
- Unit: Royal Engineers
- Awards: Companion of the Order of the Bath
- Other work: Chief Engineer, Local Government Board

Major-General Constantine Phipps Carey CB (29 May 1835 – 7 December 1906) was a British Army officer and later Chief Engineer to the Local Government Board.

== Biography ==
Carey was born in Cape Colony, the son of James Carey, of Guernsey. He was commissioned into the Royal Engineers in August 1854, promoted to lieutenant on 14 November 1854, to captain on 17 May 1860, and to major on 5 July 1872. Senior command followed when he was promoted to lieutenant-colonel on 5 December 1877, to colonel on 5 December 1881, and finally to major-general on 5 December 1882, on his retirement from the Royal Engineers.

In 1885 he was appointed Engineering Inspector of the Local Government Board, a post he held for 12 years, until he became Chief Engineer to the board in 1897, serving as such until June 1901. He also served as a member of the Royal Commission on Sewage Disposal until his death.

Following his retirement from the Local Government Board, he was appointed a Companion (civil) of the Order of the Bath (CB) in the November 1901 Birthday Honours list, and invested by King Edward VII on 17 December 1901.

== Family ==
Carey married, in 1874, Isabela Margarita Shirley, daughter of Henry Shirley, Grenadier Guards, of Peppingford, Sussex. Among their children were:

- Captain Leicester William Le Marchant Carey (d. 1914), killed during the First World War.
- Constance Isabel Carey (d. 1950)
