= William Fyers =

Lieutenant-General Sir William Fyers KCB
- Born: William Augustus Fyers; 2 July 1815; Woolwich, Kent, England
- Died: 10 November 1895; Kensington, London
- Military career
- Allegiance: United Kingdom
- Branch: British Army
- Rank: Lieutenant-General
- Conflicts: First Anglo-Afghan War; Crimean War
- Awards: Knight Commander of the Order of the Bath

Lieutenant-General Sir William Augustus Fyers KCB (2 July 1815 – 10 November 1895) was a British Army officer who served as colonel of the Durham Light Infantry.

== Early life and education ==
Fyers was born in Woolwich, the son of Major General Peter Fyers CB. He was educated at the Military College Edinburgh.

== Military career ==
Fyers was commissioned as an ensign in the 4th Regiment of Foot on 17 October 1834. He was sent to Sindh with the 40th Regiment of Foot in 1839 and took part in the capture of Karachi and then saw action in the First Anglo-Afghan War. He served with the 97th Regiment of Foot during the Crimean War and then commanded a battalion at the Siege of Cawnpore in June 1857 and at the Siege of Lucknow in Autumn 1857 during the Indian Rebellion. He went on to be colonel of the Durham Light Infantry.
