= Samuel Butler Provis =

British civil servant (1845–1926)

Sir Samuel Butler Provis CH KCB (9 February 1845 – 11 July 1926) was a British civil servant, working at the Local Government Board for 37 years.

== Early life and education ==
Provis was born in Warminster in 1845, the eldest son of Samuel and Mary Provis, of Bath. He was educated at Queens' College, Cambridge, and called to the Bar at Middle Temple in 1866.

== Career ==
Provis was appointed Junior Legal Assistant to the Local Government Board in 1872, advanced to Assistant Secretary in 1882, and was Permanent Secretary to the Board from 1898 until 1910, when he retired. During his career he assisted in a complete change in the system of English local government. The passing of the Local Government Act 1888 established county councils, and the Local Government Act 1894 established parish and district councils, both acts together transferred local affairs from justices to popular elected bodies. He was among the members of the 1905-09 Royal Commission on the Poor Laws, where he signed the majority report.

He was appointed a Companion of the Order of the Bath (CB) in 1887, and promoted to Knight Commander (KCB) of the order in the 1901 Birthday Honours list in November 1901. He was knighted and received the insignia of the order from King Edward VII on 17 December 1901. In the 1918 Birthday Honours list, Provis was appointed a Member of the Order of the Companions of Honour (CH).

He never married, and died on 11 July 1926.

Political offices
Preceded by Sir Hugh Owen	Permanent Secretary to the Local Government Board; 1898–1910	Succeeded by Sir Horace Cecil Monro
