= George Lisle Ryder =

British civil servant

Sir George Lisle Ryder KCB (1838 – 30 June 1905) was a British civil servant in the Treasury and Chairman of the Board of Customs.

== Background ==
Ryder was born in 1838, the son of George Dudley Ryder (1810–1880) by Sophia Lucy Sargent (d. 1850), daughter of Rev. John Sargent. His grandfather was Rev. the Hon. Henry Ryder, Bishop of Lichfield, who was himself the fifth son of the 1st Baron Harrowby. His brother was the Very Reverend Henry Ignatius Dudley Ryder (1837–1907) who became a Roman Catholic priest. His maternal aunts (Sargent sisters) were married to Samuel Wilberforce, Henry Wilberforce, and Henry Edward Manning.

== Career ==
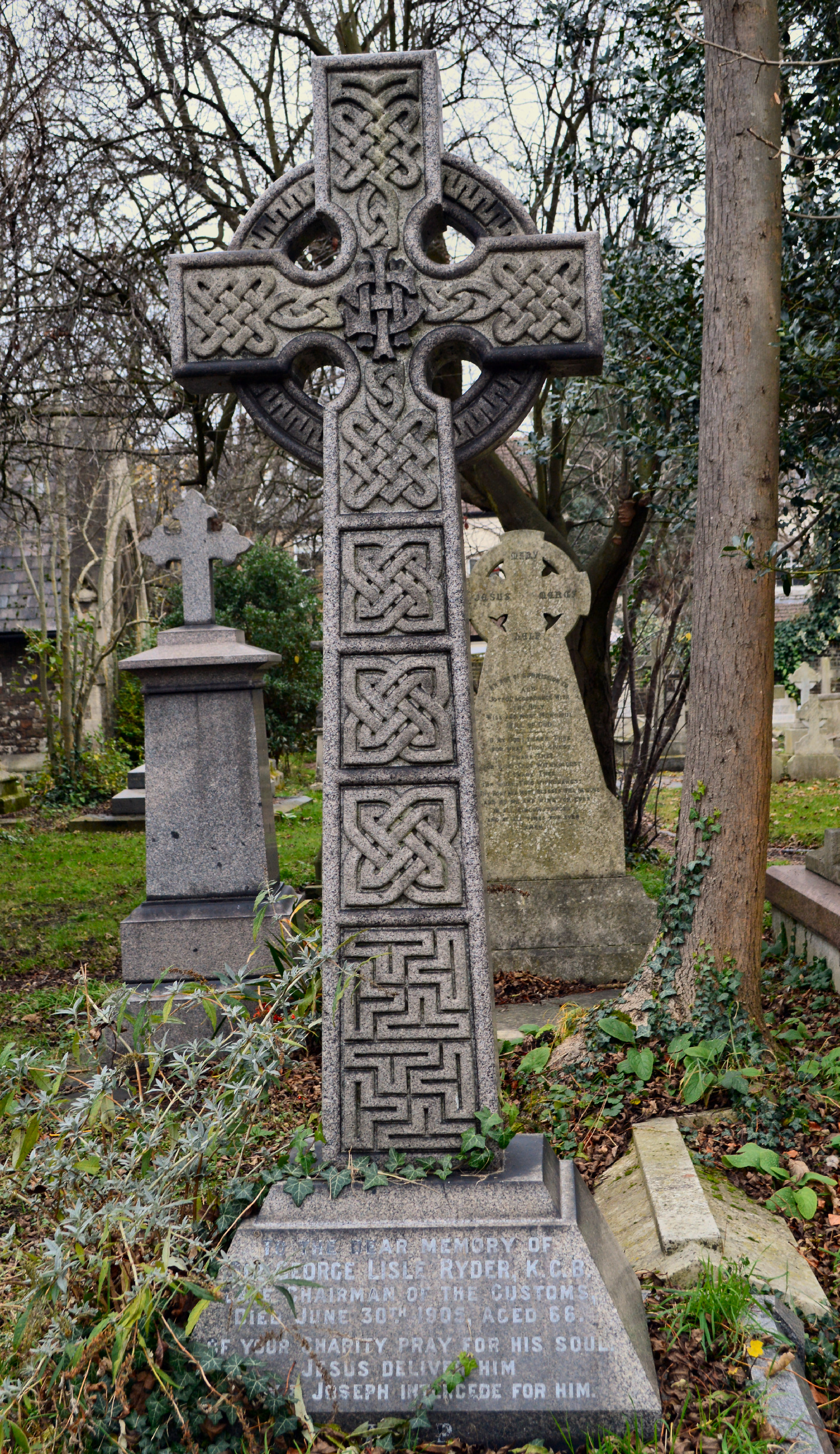
St Mary Magdalen, Mortlake

Ryder entered the Treasury in 1857, and became Principal Clerk in 1882, and Auditor of the Civil list in 1895. He was appointed Chairman of the Board of Customs in February 1899, and served as such until December 1903. The following year, he was a member of Austen Chamberlain's Tariff Reform Commission.

He was appointed a Companion of the Order of the Bath (CB) in the 1889 Birthday Honours list in May 1889, and promoted to Knight Commander (KCB) of the order in the 1901 Birthday Honours list in November 1901 and received the insignia of the order from King Edward VII on 17 December 1901.

== Family ==
Ryder married, in 1882, his first cousin Edith Helena Ryder (1845–1921), daughter of Rev. Henry Dudley Ryder (1803–1877), Canon of Lichfield, by his second wife Eliza Julia Tucker (d.1897). Lady Ryder was elected a Fellow of the Royal Horticultural Society in 1902.

He died at his residence in Kensington on 30 June 1905. Lady Ryder died in 1921. He is buried at St Mary Magdalen, Mortlake.

Political offices
Preceded by Sir Henry Primrose	Chairman of the Board of Customs; 1899–1903	Succeeded by Sir Thomas John Pittar
