= Thales (painter) =

Ancient Greek painter

Thales of Sicyon (Ancient Greek: Θαλῆς) was an ancient Greek painter who is mentioned with the epithet megalophyes, genius by Diogenes Laërtius (i. 38), on the authority of Demetrius Magnes. In the same passage, Diogenes speaks of another Thales, as mentioned in the work of Duris on painting; it may be presumed, therefore, that this Thales was a painter, but whether the two were different persons, or the same person differently mentioned by Demetrius and by Duris, cannot be determined.

He is placed by a late Byzantine writer, Theodore Hyrtacenus, on a level with Pheidias and Apelles.
