= William Markby =

English judge (1829–1914)

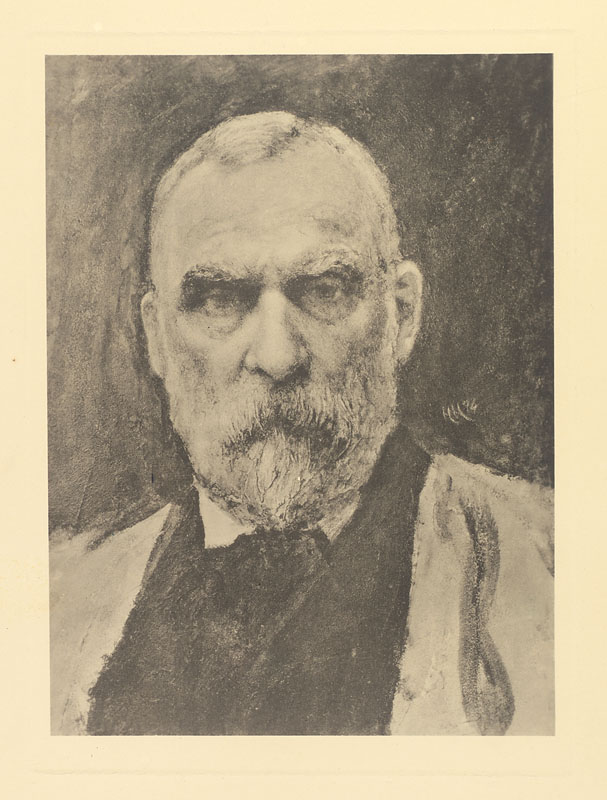
Sir William Markby

Sir William Markby, KCIE (31 May 1829 – 15 October 1914) was an English judge and legal writer.

== Career ==
Markby was born on 31 May 1829, the fourth son of the Rev. William Henry Markby, Rector of Duxford in Cambridgeshire. He was educated at Bury St. Edmunds and from 1846 at Merton College, Oxford, where he took his degree in Mathematics 1850. He was called to the bar in 1850 (or 1853?), and in 1865 he became recorder of Buckingham. In 1866, Markby went to India as judge of the Calcutta High Court. This post he held for twelve years. He also became the Vice Chancellor of the University of Calcutta. On his retirement in 1878, he was knighted and appointed as Reader in Indian Law at Oxford University, a post he held until 1900. He was also Tutor and Senior Bursar of Balliol College. In February 1900 he was appointed perpetual curator of the Indian Institute, in recognition of his long and valuable service to the University.

He was a member of the Commission to inquire into the administration of justice at Trinidad and Tobago. Besides Lectures on Indian Law, he wrote Elements of Law considered with reference to the General Principles of Jurisprudence. The latter, being intended in the first place for Indian students, calls attention to many difficulties in the definition and application of legal conceptions which are usually passed over in textbooks, and it ranks as one of the few books on the philosophy of law which are both useful to beginners and profitable to teachers and thinkers.

In 1897 appeared The Indian Evidence A Ct, with Notes. Sir William Markby also contributed to the law magazines, articles on Law and Fact, German Jurists and Roman Law, Legal Fictions, etc., several of which are embodied in the later editions of the Elements. He was made D.C.L. of Oxford in 1879, and appointed a Knight Commander of the Order of the Indian Empire (KCIE) in 1889.

== Family ==
Markby married, on 22 March 1866, Lucy Taylor (1841–1928), and their only child, an unnamed son, was born and died in Calcutta the following October.

On his retirement from the bench in 1878, the couple returned to England. In March 1879 Markby bought the southernmost plot of land to the east of Pullens Lane that was being sold by John Marriott Davenport. His wife later wrote:

We soon decided that Headington Hill was a desirable spot whereon to pitch our tent and so it came about that we bought a few acres of land within the sacred limits of the University and built the house that was to be our home for so many years to come.

In September 1880 his family moved into their new house, usually known as The Pullens. The 1881 census describes the house as "Joe Pullen's, Headington Hill", and shows Sir William (51) and his wife Lucy (38) looked after by a cook, parlourmaid, housemaid, and kitchenmaid. It was in this house that Sir William would have written Elements of law considered with reference to principles of general jurisprudence (first edition 1889; sixth edition 1905).

The Markby family was away from Headington at the time of both the 1891 and 1901 censuses, but Sir William, who continued to be "Tutor to the Indian probationers" when he retired from being Reader in Indian Law, is listed as the occupier of Pullens in directories until his death in Headington at the age of 85 on 15 October 1914. He was buried at Headington Cemetery four days later.

For some unknown reason Lady Markby then renamed their house "Fairfield". In 1917 she published a book about her husband. She remained in the house until her death at the end of 1928.
