= Thales Pease =

Sir Thales Pease
- Born: 12 August 1835; Plumstead, England
- Died: 26 February 1919 (aged 83); Kensington, England
- Military career
- Allegiance: United Kingdom
- Branch: British Army
- Service years: 1855–1902
- Rank: Colonel
- Conflicts: Sudan campaign
- Awards: Knight Commander of the Order of the Bath

Colonel Sir Thales Pease KCB (12 August 1835 – 26 February 1919) was a British Army and Navy ordnance officer.

== Biography ==
Pease was born in Plumstead, Kent, on 12 August 1835, the son of William Pease (1799–1848) and Susannah Moore (1798–1881), of Woolwich.

He entered the service in 1855 under the Board of Ordnance, joined the Ordnance Store Department as a Deputy-Commissary on its creation in November 1875, and was appointed Assistant Commissary-General of Ordnance on 31 January 1880. When officers of the Ordnance Store Department were permitted to receive honorary military rank in February 1885, Pease received the honorary rank of Lieutenant-colonel. In 1884–1885 he served in the Sudan campaign as senior ordnance store officer, Nile Expedition, was mentioned in dispatches, and in recognition of his services was promoted Deputy Commissary-General of Ordnance with the honorary rank of colonel 15 June 1885. He was appointed a Companion of the Order of the Bath (CB) in 1889.

In 1890 Pease was appointed technical adviser to a committee to which was entrusted the duty of forming a separate ordnance department for the Navy, and in October 1891 he was transferred to the new Naval Ordnance Department at the Admiralty. He was Storekeeper-general of Naval ordnance at the Admiralty from 1891 until February 1902, when he retired.

Owing to his foresight in having reserves at a critical time, the Admiralty was able to give material assistance to the Army in the early part of the Second Boer War (1899–1902). In recognition, Pease was in the Birthday Honours list published 9 November 1901 appointed a Knight Commander of the Order of the Bath (KCB), and invested as such by King Edward VII at St James's Palace on 17 December 1901.

Pease died at Kensington on 26 February 1919.

== Family ==
Pease married first, in 1856, Lavinia Jolly (1836–1902), daughter of Robert Jolly, of Woolwich. Lady Pease died at St. Brelade′s, Vancouver-road, Catford on 20 November 1902. They had five children, including:

- Lieutenant-General Leonard Thales Pease, CB (1859–1936), Royal Marine Artillery
- Annie Emilie Pease (b.1861), who married John Sowter
- Captain Lawrence Willoughby Pease (1862–1929), King's Own Yorkshire Light Infantry
- Jessie Mabel Pease (1868–1954), who married Surgeon-Captain Edmund Percival Isaacs-Coke (1869–1925)
- Percy D. Pease

Following his first wife's death, Pease remarried, in 1904, Flora Louise Hubert, daughter of Mons Hubert, of Kensington.
