= William Frost Nuthall =

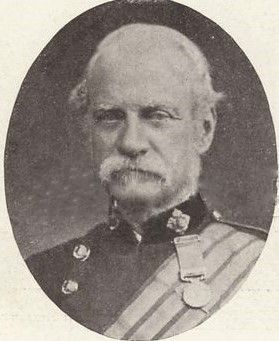
- William Frost Nuthall, London Illustrated News, 10 December 1902
- Born: c. 1818
- Died: 10 December 1902 (aged 83–84); Middlesex
- Military career
- Allegiance: United Kingdom
- Branch: British Indian Army
- Rank: General

General William Frost Nuthall (1818–1902) was a senior officer in the Indian Staff Corps.

== Biography ==
Nuthall joined the British Army, where he served for 49 years in the Bengal Infantry seeing many years in British Burma. He took part in the Second Anglo-Burmese War (1852–53), where he drew together three outpost of the Arracan Battalion in the Aeng Pass, with which he surprised and captured the summit of the pass. He received the thanks of the Governor-General for his services several times.

He was promoted to major-general on 2 November 1868, to lieutenant-general on 1 October 1877, and to general on 15 February 1880.

In the early 1870s he was posted in Manipur as the officiating Political Agent. He was given charge of the Munipur Contingent during the Lushai Expedition of 1871–72, during which he effectively helped extend Manipur's southern border to Chivu, where it currently lies.

He died in his residence at Sheffield-gardens Campden Hill in Middlesex on 10 December 1902, and was buried in London. His will and administration was handed to his son William Frederick Nuthall, a lieutenant colonel in H.M. army.

== Family ==
Nuthall married twice, first to Ellen Wood (1826–1889), daughter of James Wood, of Calcutta; secondly to a daughter of General Beckwith Baker. There were children of the first marriage.

== Sources ==
- MyHeritage. "England & Wales, Index of Wills and probabtes, 1853-1943". MyHeritage.
