= Mizo name =

Personal names used by the Mizo people

Mizo names are personal names used by the Mizo people in, or originating from, Northeast India and Myanmar. In the Mizo traditional system, a given name is specifically gender-based and the whole name is single-worded (mononymic). As in many Asian traditions, the Mizo and related Tibeto-Burman names normally do not have surnames. However, unlike other Tibeto-Burman languages, the Mizo language adopted gender classification in the given name: a suffix with -a denotes a male and -i, a female. However, not all clans of the Mizo universally use the system and modernised names have multiple parts, including English or other foreign given names and surnames.

The British rule of the Mizo people and the ensuing mass Christianisation coupled with westernisation had huge influence on the Mizo naming system. Erstwhile not known names, including foreign names and surnames, became commonly adopted. The proper names in modern times are popularly a reflection of Christian worship; some of the common prefixes, Lal, Van and Vanlal, which were once restricted to regal names, are popular as allusion to God and Heaven. An impetus for the change into and popularisation of foreign names and western naming order consisting of first, middle name and surname, or at least two-part name is that Mizo traditional names, both spelling and pronunciation, are difficult for others, some countries prohibiting single-part names (like the Middle East countries) and some Indian official registry requiring surnames and other parts of the name. A modern convention of incorporating clan names as surnames in multi-part names is still not technically a surname system, since surnames are not used in the calling name.

== Traditional name ==
=== Background ===
Mizo language is originally part of the Sino-Tibetan and Tibeto-Burman languages with several common linguistic roots to Burmese language. Within the language subgroup Mizo shares names of people, objects, verbs and nature with other ethnic languages. Mizo language is further categorised under the central Kuki-chin group that includes Mizo (Duhlian), Bawm (Sunthla and Panghawi), Falam (Hallam, Ranglong, Darlong, Hauhulh, Simpi, Hualngo, Chorei), Thor (Tawr), Hmar, Hrangkhol, Biate (Biete), Hakha (Lai/Pawi, Mi-E, Zokhua), Pangkhua, Saihriem, Laizo/Tlaisun, Khualsim, Zanniat, Zahau, and Sim. People using the Mizo language are distributed in Pherzawl district of Manipur, parts of Cachar district and Karbi Anglong district of Assam, southern Tripura, and the entire Mizoram, in India; as wells as western regions of Myanmar and the Chittagong Hill Tracts of Bangladesh. The people and their language emerged as a result of Zo or Zomi diaspora in the 19th century.

Mizo was purely an oral language until the people encountered the British in the late 19th century. In 1894, Welsh missionaries under Robert Arthington's Aborigines Mission, James Herbert Lorrain and Frederick William Savidge arrived in Aizawl, and their first work was creating the Mizo alphabet. Lorrain and Savidge, and later missionaries, established the written Mizo language and largely influenced creating personal names.

=== Structure ===
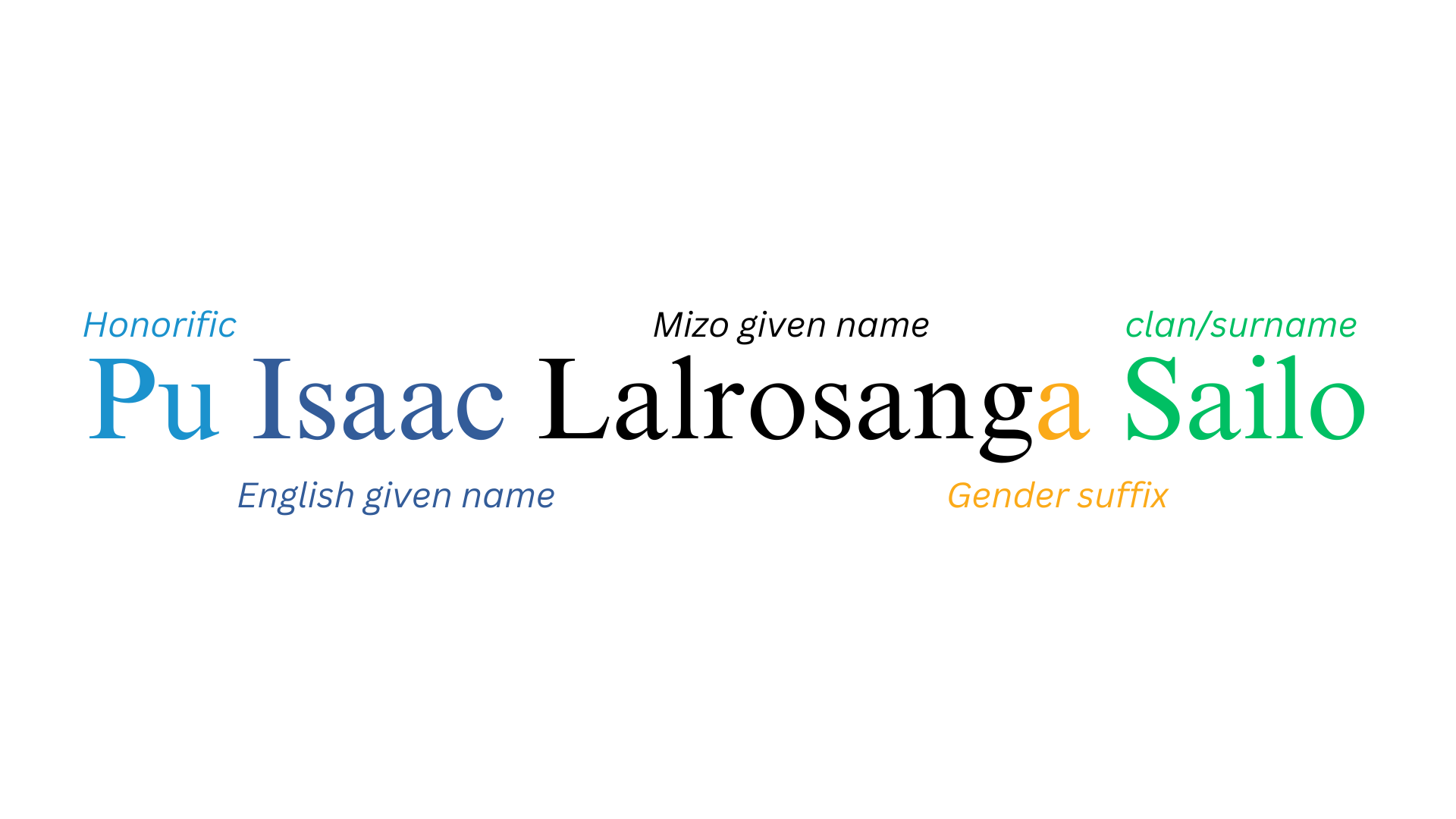
A sample of modern Mizo name in western order style.

Traditional Mizo names are a single given name and strictly composed of one part (mononyms). A complete name is typically two to four syllables, but never monosyllabic. Mizo names are unisex but rely on suffix identification. Although written in one word, the name basically comprises two components: the main given name which identifies individuals and a terminal syllable which is a gender determinant. The gender suffix is either -a for males and -i for females; in spoken, a sounds as English short a (IPA ə), while i is English short e (IPA ɪ). The main name without the suffix can be common to both sexes, as a neutral gender.

Examples:

- "Khuma" and "Khara" were the first Mizo people to receive Christian baptism in 1899. The suffixes -a indicate they were males.
- "Ropuiliani" was the chieftain of Denlung and surrounding chiefdoms during the Chin-Lushai Expedition of 1889–90. The suffix -i identifies the person as a female.

==== Pre-Mizo script records ====
The British army officers and administrative officials were the first foreigners to make contact with and survey the lands inhabited by the Mizo people, and started the first written records of the culture and society of the different tribes. Captain Thomas Herbert Lewin first mentioned one Mizo chief named "Rutton Poia" in his monograph The Hill Tracts of Chittagong and the Dwellers Therein in 1869. Lewin mistook the name as two parts in all his accounts, but the correct name is "Rothangpuia". A. Campbell, a medical officer, reported in 1874 some Mizo (then variously called and spelled Lushais or Looshais or Kookis or Kookas) names based on English phonetics and alphabets such as:

  - "Vanpilal", which would be properly written in Mizo script as "Vanpuilala", name of a chieftain.
  - "Vanolel", which would be "Vanhnuailiana", a major chieftain.

Two army officers, Robert Gosset Woodthorpe (in his 1873 book The Lushai Expedition, 1871–1872) and Lewin (in A Fly on the Wheel: Or, How I Helped to Govern India of 1885), who led the Lushai Expedition, were the first to document comprehensive lists of the Mizo chiefs. In addition to "Vanpilal" (or "Voupilal" according to Woodthorpe) and "Vanolel", some notable names are:

  - "Lalboora" is correctly "Lalburha".
  - "Lalingvoom" is "Lallianvunga".
  - "Lalsavoong" is "Lalsavunga".
  - "Sukpilal" is "Suakpuilala".
  - "Lai Jika" is "Lalzika".

Lewin was also the first to document the structure of Mizo language. In his 1874 book Progressive Colloquial Exercises in the Lushai Dialect, he exemplified the use of common Mizo names:

  - "My brother's name is Muktee" means "Koyma u hming Mukia ani." [In modern script: "Ka u hming chu Mukia a ni."]
  - "The daughter of my female slave is named Laijovi" means "Koyma boinu afanu a-hming Laijovi ani ey." [In modern script: "Ka bawihnu fanu hming chu Lalzovi a ni e."]

In the book, Lewin also recorded folk tales of male and female characters such as "Lal Rounga" [modern script: "Lalruanga"] and "Kungori" [modern script: "Kungawrhi"].

=== Vocative case ===
In verbal address, Mizo names, whether single-part or multiple-part form, are not used in the full forms. Usually two syllables from any part of the name are used. In case of multiple syllabic name, the gender suffix is always eliminated.

Examples: "Thanphunga" will be addressed as "Thangphung" by dropping the third syllable, the suffix; "Liankungi" is to be addressed as "Liankung."

In case of two syllabic name, the gender suffix is retained.

Examples: "Khuma" is always "Khuma" in writing or verbal address; "Tungi" remains "Tungi".

=== Regal names ===
In the past, regal names were reserved within the use of Mizo chieftains. The Mizo has an idiom "lal hming sakna dâl lo" signifying the traditional rule that literally means "unhindered to the chief's name" so that it was customary for a commoner to avoid any name that might be associated with the chieftains. Names of the chiefs popularly included "Lal" and "Van" which refers to chieftainship and greatness are unsuitable for the commoners. Such names as "Lalburha", "Vanpuilala", "Vanhnuailiana", etc., would not be given to commoners.

The elitist naming was practically ended due to Independence of India from the British rule in 1947. The birth of new democratic government facilitated creation of political parties for the citizens. The first major party in Mizoram, the Mizo Union, which largely proliferated out of anachronistic attitude towards tribal chiefs was particularly effective in ousting the Mizo chiefdoms and thus obliterating the regal naming tradition.

=== Warriors ===
Warriors were central to the safety and security of the Mizo communities, and were distinguished from the general public and attire. Their names also carried social distinctions not shared by others. For example, "Kapṭiala" would be that the person had shot (kap) a striped beast, a tiger (ṭial). "Saizahawla" signifies, in exaggeration, one who fought hundred elephants. "Keivawmhranga" suggests an encounter with the beasts such as bears and tigers.

==== Hypocorism ====
Pet names were also given to warriors to replace their birth names. "Taitesena" was a new name given to Ralthatchhunga Khiangte – a birth name already an expression of bravery against enemies. "Thangzachhinga" as a warrior became "Vanapa".

=== Teknonymy ===
The Mizos historically practised teknonymy. Teknonyms were used amongst elders and parents only. Many notable people changed their birth names by adopting the names of their firstborn. Thanzachhinga's firstborn was Vana, hence his new name "Vanapa" (literally "Vana's father"). Another warrior, Khawtindala had a firstborn daughter, Burkhawni, so he became "Burkhawnipa". A noted folk composer, Hmarlutvunga was later known as "Awithangpa" after his firstborn son, Awithanga. This custom of identifying parents by their children's name is known as Fa Hming Koh (naming after the firstborn).

=== Clan names ===
Mizo clans also had common syllables associated with them based on their clans. For example, the Sailo clan used the term "Ngur" commonly among males and females. The Chawngthu clan used "ch" for the beginning of names and the Pawi (Lai people) used "hrang" as syllables. As the Sailo chiefs were the dominant ruling clan in pre-colonial Mizoram, many non-Sailo clans took on the nomenclature of Sailo naming conventions. This was mainly due to intermixing. However, in some cases, the bawi ('slave or bonded labourer') of a chief would have their children named by their owner.

=== Conversion of foreign names ===
For the early Mizo people, foreign names were not easily recognised, so that Mizo-rendering names were given. They called the British people Sâp, a corruption of the Hindi/Urdu word sahib, used as a "respectful title used by the natives of India in addressing an Englishman or other European (= 'Sir')." The Mizo-adapted words came to be used for many British missionaries, who were later collectively named Zosâp.

  - The first missionaries were Frederick William Savidge, called "Sap Upa" (for old sahib), and James Herbert Lorrain, names "Pu Buanga" ("Mr Brown").
  - The first Presbyterian missionaries were David Evan Jones, called "Zosaphluia" (the older Mizo white man or Mizo-sahib), and Edwin Rowlands, called "Zosapthara" (the new Mizo-sahib).
  - Edith Mary Chapman became "Pi Zirtiri" (the teacher; "Pi" is a honorific title for women).

The British officers were not normally given the sâp names:

  - Thomas Herbert Lewin was called "Thangliana" (the greatly famous/well-known).
  - The first political officer, Captain Herbert Richard Browne was named "Hmaireka" (pinched face).
  - Browne's successor Robert Blair McCabe was infamous for capturing the chiefs and was called "Lalmantua" (he who captures chiefs).
  - Major John Shakespeare, the first Superintendent (the highest administrative officer) of the Lushai District, was known as "Tarmita" (the spectacled).

==== Transliteration ====
The Mizo people found some foreign names similar in tone to Mizo words and gave Mizo names based on their original names.

  - Basil Edward Jones and his wife Margareth Jones were called "Pu Zâwna" and "Pi Zâwni" respectively.
  - Molly Parker and her companion Imogen P. Roberts were called "Pi Pari" and "Pi Rovi".
  - Owen William Owen became "Pu Âwna".
  - Rev. Frederick Joseph Sandy, who started formal education among the Mizos, was "Pu Dîa".

== Modern names ==
=== Mononyms ===
Following the traditional Mizo names, many modern names are made of one part, multisyllabic words and with gender determinant.

Example:

- "Lalrinpuii" is with a female suffix, such as the Minister of State of Mizoram since 2023.
- "Lalduhawma" is a male name, as that of the Chief Minister of Mizoram since 2023. The person chose an alternate spelling "Lalduhoma".

=== Hypocorism ===
It is customary in Mizo community to use and have pet names in diminutive forms of the full names. Full names are not used in verbal communication and is considered a rude behaviour. Especially in a close family, calling by a full name is an indication of confrontational situation and aggressive interaction. An individual name can have a variety of pet names.

Example:

- "Lalrinoma" can be called "Rina", "Rintea", "Marina", etc.
- "Zothanpari" can be called "Zovi", "Thani", "Pari", "Zotei", "Partei", "Athani", etc.

In all the derivatives, the gender suffixes are retained and can be transposed to other syllables such as in "Marina" (Ma-rin-a, not Ma-ri-na) in which -a is originally part of the syllable -oma. In extended derivatives like "Marina" and "Athani", the prefixes Ma- and A-denote endearment and is used in a close community; additional insertion such as in -te- as in "Rintea" and "Partei" are also similar endearment.

In some cases, the pet name can completely replace the given name while still retaining the gender determinant. For example, Lalnghinglova Hmar (a journalist and Minister of State of since 2023) is most widely known as "Tetea"; Lalrindiki Khiangte, a popular singer, is mostly known by the name "Daduhi".

=== Christianisation ===
The establishment of British rule in 1889, the mass christianisation the Mizo people and development of formal education had huge impact in the naming conventions of the Mizo people. The title and common prefix Lal-, previously reserved for chiefs to signify their authority and sovereignty, came to represent the "Almighty God" in Christian theology, democratizing its usage across society. For instance, "Lalrinchhani" means "having faith in God." By the 20th century, allusions to God and Heaven, Lal, Van and Vanlal became the most common components of Mizo names. Many people bears names like "Laldinpuii", "Lalhmangaihi", "Lalremruata", "Vanhlira", "Vanlalhruaia", etc. As Lalthlamuong Keivom remarked: If all people with lal in their names are to be annihilated, over half of the total population in Mizoram will perish.

In addition to Mizo names with religious references, Biblical names such as John, Isaac, Esther, Ruth, and Jacob have become common, replacing the traditional first name with the Biblical names and moving the Mizo given names as the middle name or surname. Some have integrated the Biblical terms into the Mizo given name, such as "Lalkrawsthanga" ("kraws" for cross, the crucifix). "Gospela" and "Gospeli" (like the singer), "Israela" (another singer), and "Jerusalemi" are relatively common.

=== Two-part names ===
Up to the mid-20th century, the traditional single-part name was used by the Mizo people. The influence of western education and exposure to British culture started to make their marks in restructuring the naming tradition conducive to the foreigners. The first notable name change and adoption was Suakmitchhinga who was among the first Christian converts and an aide to Lorrain and Savidge. In an enrolment to the first Mizo school in 1903, his name was "Suaka", the most commonly used part of his name. In later official records, his was written "M. Suaka" (M from his last-part name). In that first school all the 20 students had one-part names, including the two girls, Nuii (Nui-i) and Saii (Sai-i).

The first Mizo to have an education abroad was Chawngnghilhlova, who earned a degree of Diploma in Education from London in 1925. He later adopted the name "Ch. Pasena" (the given name became abbreviated and the second part is the nickname).

==== Integrating clan names ====
A two-part name became more popular as education and Christianity progressed. As in the eastern name order practiced by most Asian cultures, the surname (clan) comes first followed by the given name. One of the first school teachers was Hranghnuka who became "D.K. Kawnga" (in reference to "Denga Khiangte Kawnga" in which "Khiangte" is a clan name and the rest pet names). The first Mizo, as well as a tribal, to qualify for Indian Administrative Service in 1954 was Jamchonga Nampui (Nampui is a clan of the Mizo sub-tribe Biate).

Two-part name using clan name became a popular naming tradition. A common system is abbreviating the clan name since the Mizo people do not call each other by clan names. "K. Sapdanga", the name of journalist and Home Minister since 2023, indicates the clan Khawlhring. In an alternate variation, a western name order is applied so that the clan name in the second part functions as a surname. However, the clan name is not used, especially in verbal communication, and is thus technically not a surname.

=== Socio-political influences ===
Before the birth of Indian politics and demise of chieftainship, Mizo people were warring tribes, one chieftain often invading others. There was no umbrella name for the different sub-tribes for which the diverse clans were known collectively but in ambiguous names like Lushais or Looshais or Lusei or Kookis or Kookas or Kukis. The name "Lushai" was used for all the clans under which the people became more united under the British rule; the administrative are was designated the Lushai District under the government of Assam. The British missionaries established the most inclusive organisation based on Mizo culture named the Young Lushai Association in 1933. As India was preparing for independence from Britain, in 1946, a prefatory political party was created and named the Lushai Commoners Union, which was soon after changed to Mizo Common People's Union, and finally Mizo Union, within the same year. The name "Mizo" became more acceptable to the natives for all the clans. In 1947, YLA was renamed Young Mizo Association; the administrative region became Mizo District in 1954.

Introduction of the term "Mizo" influenced ethnic nationalism such that zo became part of many personal names. "Zohmangaiha" "Zoramchhana", "Zonunpari", "Zonunmawia", etc. became popular. The first Mizo Youth Icon in 2006 was Zoramchhani. Zoramthanga was Chief Minister from 1998 to 2008 and 2018 to 2023.

== Indian system and westernisation ==
The Indian federal law does not define the official system of naming, single-part and abbreviated names can be created in the enrolment to the most important documents including Indian passport, permanent account number (PAN) and Aadhaar (citizenship identification). PAN has option for three-part names and allows single-part name in the "last name/surname" category, while prohibiting abbreviations or initials only such as commonly used by the Mizo people and south Indians. However, abbreviation is allowed in the middle name. Aadhaar is more flexible and allows various naming conventions as long as supporting documents exist such as birth certificates. The Indian passport has drawbacks by allowing single-part name but insisting on two-part names, but no abbreviations. Middle East countries had specifically demanded two-part names for all Indian travellers.

Some south Indians simply divide the convenient syllables of their names into two parts. For example, "Varunshankar" is split into "Varun Shankar". In western countries, opening accounts or transactions in banks require two-part names. Some Mizo people with only one-part name entered their full names both in the first and last/surname. However, these practices of splitting or making up full names can create problems since a name should be consistent to the character in all Indian documents including bank accounts. As a result there was an uproar in 2019 when the Indian government and the Supreme Court mandated linking of all identifications (PAN and Aadhaar) with bank accounts.

Mizo people in Myanmar have developed a tradition of splitting the syllables of their names for ease of passport and document registrations. Still retaining the traditional Mizo name they write in several parts, like "Lian Thang Vunga" or "Daw Sei Thangi". The first Mizo to participate in Olympic Games was Vanlal Dawla (as registered in the Olympics registry) who represented Myanmar in boxing in 1972.

=== Western order names ===
Particular for those who live in mixed communities with other ethnic groups, Mizo traditional names can face shortcomings both in pronunciation and writing. For universality some people have adopted multiple-part names, usually using first foreign names, Mizo traditional name as the middle names and clan names as surnames. A linguist, Lalrinmuani Kingbawl experienced identity issues among other people for her name is too long and difficult to pronounce for non-Mizo people; she adopted "Rebecca" as the first name and writes as "Rebecca L. Kingbawl". Some Mizo Indian Administrative Service officers are Robert Lalchungnunga Chongthu, Christina Zothanpari Chongthu and Grace Lalrindiki Pachuau. Joy Lalkrawspari Pachuau, professor of history at Jawaharlal Nehru University and winner of the 2014 Mizo Award, officially writes her name as "Joy L.K. Pachuau".

=== Marital names ===
Adopting one's husband's surname is a common practice in most Indian cultures. However, the Mizo people normally never change their maiden names. A rare instance is Lalthantluangi Khiangte ("Khiangte" is a clan name) who became the first Mizo woman to qualify for the IAS in 1979; after her marriage she adopted her husband's clan name and became "L. Tochhawng" (variant "L. Tochhong").

== Pseudonyms ==
An early influence of westernisation was the use of pseudonyms by notable people ranging from government officials, church leaders to musical artists.

For example:

- A traditional Christian singer, "Siampuii Sailo" was by birth name "Lalthansiami".
- A Christian composer, "Damhauha" was originally "Lallianchhunga".
- One of the earliest government officials and authors, "P.S. Dahrawka" was originally "Kaphnuna". The full name is "Pawi Sasem Dahrawka". "Pawi Sasem" being the name of his clan.
- One of the earliest clergies and historians, "Liangkhaia" was by birth "Kaphnuna".

=== Pen names ===
The earliest high-ranking officers who were also writers made pen names popular. Kaphnuna always used the name "P.S. Dahrawka". An Indian Foreign Service officer and the first Mizo ambassador of India, K.C. Lalvunga wrote his novels under the name "Zikpuii Pa", Zikpuii being his firstborn. An early lawyer, J. Malsawma originally wrote under the name "Mang N Mang" after a fictional son "Mang Neih Mang" ("Mang" itself was his father's Name), and when he actually had a firstborn daughter, he adopted the name "Thanpuii Pa".

Among later generations, pen names became less popular. A notable individual is Vanramchhuangi who writes under the name "Ruatfela Nu".

== Kinship and honorific ==
In Mizo culture, the terms "pi" and "pu" are used to designate men and women in different aspects. The compound term "pi leh pu" itself means ancestors (indicating ancestral females and males). In kinship term, the terms are used for calling names to parents: father is called "pa", so one calls his/her father "ka pa"; mother is "nu", her children call her "ka nu". In community reference, they are used as titles to indicate married women and men respectively. They are also used to signify elders a sign of respect:

  - Pu Rema (which is equivalent to Mr Rema).
  - Pi Kungi (Mrs Kungi).

The terms are also used as honorific to eminent people as a gesture of respect.

  - For a female traditional composer and singer, "Pi Hmuaki" is universally used, but not "Hmuaki".
  - British missionary nurse E.O. Dicks was called "Pi Dawki".
  - The first Mizo to become Brigadier of the Indian Army and second Chief Minister, Ṭhenphunga Sailo is known and called by the name "Pu Ṭhena" (but not "Phunga" or "Sailo").
