= Languages of Bangladesh =

"Languages spoken across Bangladesh" (2022)
1. Bangla (99.0%)
2. Others (1.00%)

Bangladesh linguistic diversity as per 2022 census
Language	Population
Bangla	163,507,029
Others	1,651,587
Total	165,158,616

The national language and official language of Bangladesh is Bangla according to the third article of the Constitution of Bangladesh. Almost 99% of Bangladeshis speak Bangla (including dialects) as their first language. Bengali Language Implementation Act, 1987 made it mandatory to use Bengali in all government affairs except in the cases of foreign relations. According to the 2022 census, Bengali is predominantly spoken by 99% of the country's population and it also serves as the national language of the nation. The tribal people of northern and southeastern Bangladesh speak a variety of minority languages. According to the Ethnologue, there are 36 indigenous living languages, which include 17 Tibeto-Burman, 10 Indo-Aryan, 7 Austroasiatic and 2 Dravidian languages in Bangladesh. Bangladesh has 44 indigenous languages according to Professor Shameem Reza.

== Indo-Aryan languages ==
The lowlands of Bangladesh form the larger, central, and eastern half of the ethno-linguistic region of Bengal and the Bengali language is spoken by the majority of the country's inhabitants i.e. the Bengalis. There are also some Eastern Indic language varieties, which are variously classified either as dialects of Bengali or separate but closely related languages. They can be thought of as forming a dialect continuum.

- Bengali branch:
  - Standard Bengali: spoken all over the country – originally based on the Central Bengali (also known as Rarhi) variety of Nadia region (partly in Khulna Division), very close to dialect in the rest of Khulna Division.
  - Bangali: General Eastern Bengali dialect spoken (beside Standard Bengali) in most of the parts of Bangladesh (Greater Dhaka, Greater Mymensingh, Greater Jessore, Greater Khulna (excluding Satkhira), Greater Comilla, Greater Faridpur, Western Sylhet and Greater Barisal regions).
    - Dhakaiya Kutti Bengali: The dialect is spoken by the former rice cultivators of Old Dhaka.
    - Mymensinghi Bengali: Spoken by the people of Greater Mymensingh and parts of Western Sylhet regions.
  - Chittagonian: spoken by the people of Chittagong in the southeastern districts of Chittagong, Cox's Bazar and also by many Bengalis in Chittagong Hill Tracts.
  - Noakhali: Spoken by the people of Noakhali, Feni and Lakshmipur as well as some areas in southern Comilla and northern Chittagong district.
  - Varendri: Spoken by the people of the North-central Bengal region (Rajshahi Division and Dinajpur); part of the Northern Bengali dialects.
  - Rangpuri: Spoken by people of the northern region (parts of Rangpur Division); closely related to Varendri dialect.
  - Rarhi: Spoken by the people from the northern regions of the Khulna Division in the area known as Greater Kushtia.
  - Sundarbani: Spoken by the people of southern Satkhira and parts of Khulna.
  - Sylheti: Spoken by Sylhetis in the eastern part of Sylhet Division of Bangladesh.
- Tribal languages:
  - Chakma: A creole of Bengali and Chin language spoken in the Chittagong Hill Tract Region. It is related to both Bengali and the Chin (Tibeto-Burman) languages that are commonly found in the region.
  - Bishnupriya Manipuri: An Indo-Aryan lect spoken by the Bishnupriya Manipuri people who live in Bangladesh. It is a creole of Bengali and Meitei and contains features and elements of both the Bengali and Meitei (officially known as Manipuri).
  - Hajong: A Bengali-based creole which has the substratam of Hajong people's formerly spoken Tibeto-Burman language.
  - Tanchangya: spoken by the Tanchangya people in the Chittagong Hill Tracts. It is closely related to Chakma.
  - Thar: A Bengali-based Argot spoken by a sect of Bede people and other river gypsies from the Ganges Delta.
- Migrant languages:
  - Sadri: Also a major language of Jharkhand, India. Spoken widely in tea estates throughout Bangladesh by indigenous people who have abandoned their old language.
  - Bihari languages: Spoken primarily by the Bihari Muslims from Bihar, India who came during Partition.
  - Rohingya: Spoken primarily by Rohingya Muslims living in the refugee camps of Cox’s Bazar. It is closely related to Chittagonian.

== Non-Indo-Aryan languages ==
The Non-Indo-Aryan indigenous languages of the region are members of the Austroasiatic, Dravidian and Tibeto-Burman families. Most of these languages are spoken in mountainous areas.

=== Austroasiatic languages ===
While the more widely spoken and better-known Austroasiatic languages are spoken in Southeast Asia (e.g. Khmer and Vietnamese), smaller languages of that family are spoken by indigenous communities of northern and eastern Bangladesh. There are two branches of Austro-Asiatic represented in Bangladesh.

- Khasi: Spoken in Sylhet Division. Also a major language of Meghalaya, India.
- Pnar: spoken in Sylhet Division.
- War: spoken in Sylhet Division.
- Santali: spoken in Rajshahi and Rangpur Divisions. Widely spoken in West Bengal and Jharkhand, India.
- Mundari: spoken in Rajshahi and Rangpur Divisions.
- Koda: spoken in Rajshahi and Rangpur Divisions.

=== Dravidian languages ===
Two Dravidian languages are spoken in Rajshahi and Rangpur Divisions in western Bangladesh.

- Kurukh - some Kurukh people live in Sylhet tea gardens but mainly speak Sadri
- Sauria Paharia

=== Tibeto-Burman languages ===
The mountainous areas along the northern and eastern edges of the Indian Subcontinent are inhabited primarily by speakers of Tibeto-Burman languages. Indigenous Tibeto-Burman-speaking communities are found through the northern, eastern, and especially the southeastern parts of Bangladesh, primarily the Chittagong Hill Tracts.

- Arakanese: Also known as the Marma or Rakhine language. Mainly spoken in Chittagong Hill Tracts and southern Cox's Bazar. Also a major language in Rakhine state, Myanmar.
- A'Tong: spoken in Mymensingh division.
- Chak: spoken in Chittagong Hill Tracts.
- Chin languages: spoken in Chittagong Hill Tracts
  - Asho
  - Bawm
  - Falam
  - Haka
  - Khumi
  - Mara
- Koch: spoken in Mymensingh Division
- Garo: mainly spoken in Mymensingh division. Also a major language of Meghalaya, India.
- Megam: closely related to Garo, spoken in Mymensingh division
- Meitei (Manipuri): spoken in Sylhet division. Also a major language of Manipur State, India
- Mizo: spoken in Chittagong Hill Tracts. Also a major language of Mizoram State, India
- Mru: spoken in Chittagong Hill Tracts.
- Pangkhua: spoken in Chittagong Hill Tracts
- Tripuri: Spoken in Chittagong Hill Tracts. A major language of Tripura State, India

== Other languages ==
=== English ===
Before the commencement of the Bengali Language Implementation Act, 1987, English had a considerable presence in official affairs, but since 1987 the usage of English has waned significantly in government. Due to the British colonization of the country, English is still a widely spoken and commonly understood language in Bangladesh. English is taught as a compulsory subject in all schools, colleges and universities. In addition, there is an English-medium education system in Bangladesh which is widely attended. The British Council Bangladesh offers English language courses.

Similar to the situation in other SAARC nations, there are significant disparities in English-language knowledge; a significant portion of the population speaks English fluently or even natively (especially among the educated class), while an even larger portion of the population has little to no knowledge of English. Among the middle and upper class, many can read and write fluently due to professional requirements, but may have difficulty speaking English.

During the colonial period, laws were written in English. Currently, most laws are written in Bengali, the exception being amendments to laws passed before 1987, which are generally written in English. Many legal, administrative, and financial forms used by the government and banks are in English only. English is also used in the judiciary.

=== Arabic ===
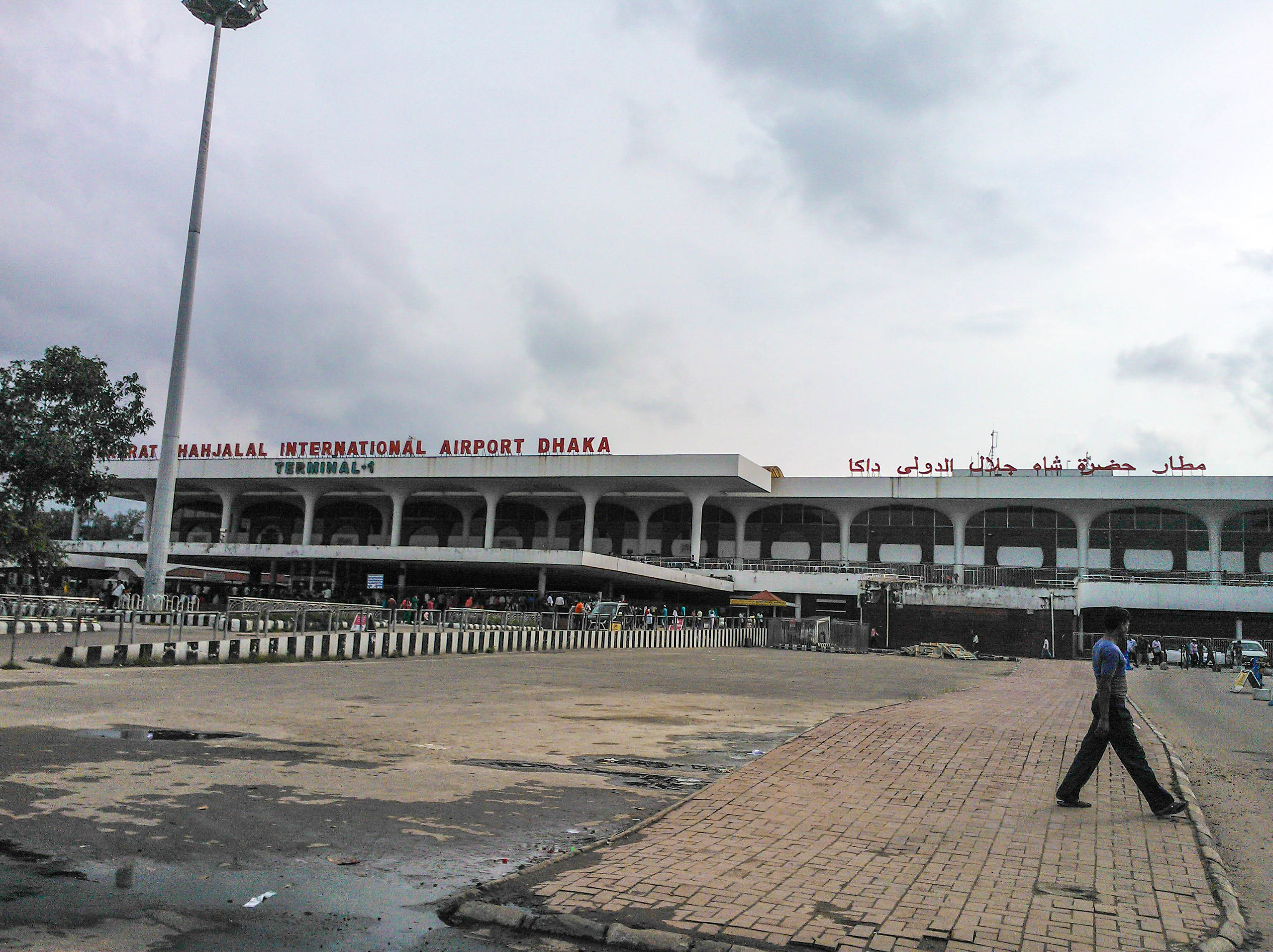
Bangladesh's largest international airport, the Hazrat Shahjalal International Airport in Dhaka, has signage in Arabic.

Since the conquest of Bengal by Muhammad Bakhtiyar Khalji in 1203 CE, Arabic (عربي) enjoyed the status of being an official language up until the British Raj period. However, its presence dates back to the 8th century CE, as a language of trade. In the 13th century, Muslim preacher Taqiuddin al-Arabi established what is thought to be the earliest Islamic institution in Bangladesh that has intact ruins. Arabic literature began to flourish first in medieval Bengal with works like Ḥawḍ al-Ḥayāh (12th century) by Qadi Ruknuddin Samarkandi, Maqāmāt by Abu Tawwama, Majmūʿah Khānī fī ʿAyn al-Maʿānī (1280s) by Kamiluddin bin Karim as well as the many works of 14th-century Bengali scholar Nur Qutb Alam. Islamic scholar Muhammad ibn Yazdan Bakhsh Bengali transcribed three volumes of Sahih al-Bukhari by hand in Ekdala, and gifted it to the Sultan Alauddin Husain Shah. The manuscript of this work is currently kept at the Khuda Bakhsh Oriental Library in the neighbouring Republic of India. Until today, Arabic literature relating to Islam continues to be regularly written and published by Bangladeshis such as Sultan Zauq Nadvi and Muhammad Abdul Malek.

Despite losing an official status from the colonial times onward, the Arabic language is used in many Muslim congregations such as the weekly Friday prayer in which a sermon (khutbah) is given in Arabic, in addition to Bengali. The Constitution of Bangladesh begins with the Arabic basmala.

Arabic is the religious language of Muslims. The Quran, Sunnah, Hadith and Muslim theology is taught in Arabic with Bengali translation. The Bangladeshi diaspora living in the Middle East has further increased the number of people who can speak Arabic in Bangladesh. Arabic is taught as a religious language in mosques, schools, colleges, universities and madrassahs as well as in traditional Bengali Muslim households. Today, Arabic is an obligatory subject in the Madrasah education of Bangladesh. A majority of Bangladesh's Muslim population has had some form of formal or informal education in the reading, writing, and pronunciation of the Arabic language as part of their religious education. Arabic has also influenced the Bengali language greatly, thus it is not uncommon to hear Arabic terminology in Bangladeshi speeches and rallies. One example of this is the 7 March Speech of Bangabandhu, which makes mention of Inshallah ('God-willing') towards the end, in addition to the many Arabic-origin Bengali words used.

=== Persian ===
Sultan Ahmad Nanupuri reciting a Persian poem by Hafez.

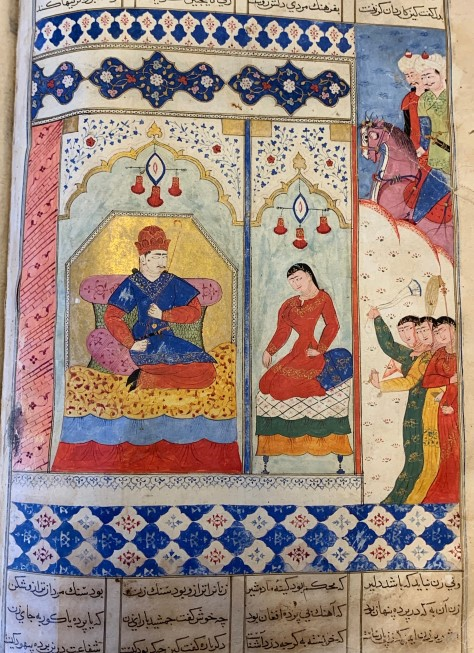
A Persian manuscript of Bengal showing Alexander sharing his throne with Queen Nushabah. The scene is based on Nizami Ganjavi's Iskandarnama (Book of Alexander). The manuscript was published by Sultan Nusrat Shah who reigned between 1519 and 1538. (British Library)

From ancient times, Bengal and Persia had been in contact with each other and there were many trading posts around coastal Bengal. As people converted to Islam, they became acquainted with Persian, the language of the Sufi preachers. Bengal witnessed an influx of Persian scholars, lawyers, teachers and clerics. The influence of the language spread rapidly after it gained the status of court language for over 600 years (1203–1837 AD) under the Delhi Sultanate, Bengal Sultanate and Bengal Subah. Thousands of Persian books and manuscripts were published in Bengal. The period of Sultan Ghiyathuddin Azam Shah's reign is described as the "golden age of Persian literature in Bengal". Its stature was illustrated by the Sultan's own correspondence and collaboration with the Persian poet Hafez; a poem which can be found in the Divan of Hafez today.

Presently, Persian is taught in some madrasas, mostly those belonging to the Befaqul Madarisil Arabia Bangladesh board, as well as at the University of Dhaka.

Dobhashi refers to a historical register of Bengali with significant Persian influence, similar to the influence of Persian on Urdu.

=== Urdu ===
Urdu (اردو) was an official language in post-partition 1947 to 1971. It is still spoken by the settlers from Bihar and Uttar Pradesh. They are living in Saidpur, Dhaka particularly Old Dhaka, and other parts of Bangladesh.
