= Mizo honorifics =

Mizo honorifics are a function of the Mizo language. As Mizo is a classifier language, it has honorifics for gender and numerals.

Pa is a honorific referring to father or male. Pa is used to denote masculinity. For example Zirtirtu-pa refers to a male teacher. Nu is the honorific for mother or femininity. For example Zirtirtu-nu refers to a female teacher. Pa would also be used as a hypocorism, for taking on their child's name. In which case, the parent would gain an honorific. A famous example is Vana Pa (Father of Vana).

Pu is a Mizo honorific for men. The honorific for women is known as Pi. The compounded phrase pi leh pu itself refers to ancestors. The honorific can be used in variety of contexts. For example it can be appended as a form of respect towards elders or respected persons. The exception of this honorific is Pi Hmuaki, a poet whose name is synonymous with her honorific rather than Hmuaki.

== See also ==
- Mizo name
- Mizo alphabet
- Pu (disambiguation)

== Sources ==
- Kumar, Ritesh; Lahiri, Bornini; Saha, Atanu; Shekhar, Sedhanshu (1 September 2011). Semantics of classifiers in some Indian Languages. Proceedings of the Third Students' Conference of Linguistics in India. Centre for Linguistics, Jawaharlal Nehru University. New Delhi: SocArXic Papers.
- Rajshekhar, M. (2021). Despite the State: Why India lets its people down and how they cope. Chennai: Context, Westland Publications. ISBN 9789395073417.
