= Ralpel =

- Ralpel (Also known as Leisen)
- Interactive map of Ralpel
- Coordinates: 22°56′40″N 93°10′41″E

Ralpel is a village in Myanmar near Dawn Tlang, Zang Tlang and Dawn on the Indo-Burman border. The village is surrounded by hilly terrains. No other people in the world speaks their language except for the males of the neighboring village Dawn (the females of Dawn Village speak the Khuafo language, while the males speak a combination of the Mizo and Lai languages). The people of Ralpel speak both Lai Language and Mizo Language fluently.

- Latitude: 22° 57' (22.95°) north
- Longitude: 93° 11' (93.1833°) east
- Average elevation: 1,532 metres (5,026 feet)

== History ==
The ancestors of Ralpel abandoned the village Khuahring and came down to Khuafo village through Chuncung village. The size of the village became bigger and they grew a population of around 500 houses. Once a man from Chuncung village came to fetch rice from the village. No sooner had he started his way back to his village than he was gunned down by the owner of his temporary lodging. Enraged by the incident, Chuncung with the help of Mangkheng and Thlanrawn planned to invade the Khuafo Village. The circulating news soon reached the ears of the Khuafo people, and left the village at around 1820.

Under the sect leader Mr. Sertivang, they established a new village Dawn. Another rebellion Khuangli emerged. All the Dawn people fled down to Runzawl (now known as Cerhlun in Mizoram State, India) to take refuge. As a group of people with an unsettled place, who were moving along the range of mountains of the Indo-Burman boundary line, they were enticed by the view of the Dawn Hill and could not banish it from their thoughts. When the revolt of Khuangli came to end, when the flooding stage of the Tiau River was lowering at the end of the rainy season, they immediately came back to Dawn Village. At the time they returned to Dawn, their leaders were Mr. Kamthai (Mualcin) and Mr. Chawnhmung (Fancun). There were only a few houses in the village.

The tomb of Thanhlir below the Ralpel Football Field. It is written as "The Living tomb of Thanhlira. Age 100. The strongest man in Thantlang District who fed his guests with 40 pigs and who erected the Ralpel Village".

A generation had passed without any conflicts. After that the village leader Mr. Sailuai heard that some parts of their land were frequently purloined by the neighbouring Lungler village, and ordered Mr. Thanhlir (Tlanglian descendant), the strongest man in the then Thantlang District, and his elder brother, Mr. Tumthul with Mr. Ne Neng (Mualcin), Mr. Kam Tu (Fancun) and Mr. Tai Ung (Aineh) to build a vedette at the location of the present day Ralpel Village in around 1892. They called the vedette Ralpel and it became an established village in 1893. Among the selected sentinels, Mr. Thankio (Hlawnceu) who was a descendant of the chief clan, was initially appointed to be the Chief (Bawi) of Ralpel Village but there was disagreement over his appointments and the Dawn Chief Mr. Sailuai appointed Mr. Satlung (Hlawnceu) instead to be the first Chief of the Ralpel Village. Mr. Thanhlir (Tlanglian) paid a tax of Ks 30/- and 6 hand-spans of copper pot for establishing Ralpel Village. For this reason, he was entitled to different kinds of the contemporaneous village taxes.

The term Ralpel is derived from the two Mizo / Lai words: Ral and Pel. In both Mizo and Lai "ral" means "enemy" and "pel" means "hunting". So the word "Ralpel" in its simplest form would be "Hunting the enemy" or "The place for hunting the enemy". Older people consider Ralpel and Dawn Village as a single-separated village.

The neighboring villages call Ralpel `Leisen`. The origin of this term 'Leisen' is not known, however, the term is believed to be used by these villages because the soil of the Ralpel is mostly red, and hence the term 'Leisen' which literally means 'Red Soil'.

== Clans of the original residents of the village ==
The people who originally lived in the Ralpel village were from the Chin tribe in Myanmar. The older residents of the village were from the following clans of the Chin Tribe (known as Mizo Tribe in Mizoram State, India).

- Aineh
- Bawitlung
- Cawnhlun
- Cinzah
- Fanchun
- Hlawnceu
- Hlawnching
- Hnamler
- Hrengsa
- Hringngen
- Mualcin
- Ramlawt
- Siakhel
- Tlanglian
- Vanngiang
- Zathang
- Zukpa

== Village Council Presidents ==
The following is the list village council presidents of Ralpel Village till today:

Sl.No.	Name	Clan	From	To
1.	Satlung	Hlawnceu	1893	1926
2.	Lenghmung	Hlawnceu	1926	1939
3.	Thangchum	Hlawnceu	1939	1948
4.	Phirceu	Hlawnceu	1948	1954
5.	Ramhnin	Hrengsa	1954	1966
6.	Mangdum	Hlawnceu	1966	1971
7.	Rualkam	Hnamler	1971	1974
8.	Hrangkhum	Ramlawt	1974	1978
9.	Rualkam	Hnamler	1978	1981
10.	Nawltling	Hlawnceu	1981	1988
11.	Hrangve	Bawitlung	1988	1994
12.	Tluangal	Tluanglian	1994	2005
13.	Lalrema	Hlawnceu	2005	2006
14.	Nawltling	Hlawnceu	Jan 2006 - Mar 2006	
15.	Thazov	Hlawnceu	Apr 2006 - Jun 2006	
16.	Khawvelthang	Bawitlung	2006	2008
17.	Sangchin	Zathang	2008	2010
18.	Tluangal	Tlanglian	2010	2013
19.	Sangchin	Zathang	2014	
20.	Sanguk	Hrengsa	2015	2016
21.	Biaktluang	Hlawnceu	2016	2018
22	Sanguk	Hrengsa	Apr 2018	March-2021
23	Lalruat	Mualcin	Nov 2021	Present

== Transportation ==
Jeepable road leading to Lungler village was started to construct in 1996 and was finished in 2010. For the first time in the history of Ralpel, a jeep reached Ralpel village in 2010. Tluangal, the then President of the Village Council contributed Ks 100000/- to make it possible. In 2013, the village community embarked on a journey to build a road to the Tio River that could be traversed by jeep. Under the watchful eyes of the village council, they labored on the road, and by 2017, they had made significant progress, covering about 3 miles. Fortunately, two brothers, Mr. Lalpeklian and Mr. Thancungnung, both descendants of Ralpel and leaders in their respective fields (the former as the principal of a Bible college in Hakha, Myanmar and the latter as an Executive Engineer in Mizoram), generously donated a large sum of money to continue the construction. Thanks to their kindness and the tireless efforts of the village community, the road was eventually completed and now stretches all the way to the Tio River. Despite being passable by jeep, the road was in poor shape. In 2019, the NDL-led Myanmar government initiated repairs, which were completed just before the military coup.

== Education ==
In 1944, the first primary school was founded in the village. In 1968, the government of Burma recognized the school. In 1980, the first middle school was established, and only one student, Laltanpui (now Dr. Laltanpui), was able to continue on to higher education. Unfortunately, the middle school was eventually closed due to a lack of teachers and poverty. However, in 1994, the middle school was reopened thanks to the efforts of the village President Tluangal and financial contributions from parents.

After a military coup in Myanmar caused all schools in the country to shut down, the Chin Defence Force instructed villages in Chin State to open schools. The village community decided to offer education up to grade 9 and fully funded these schools. The curriculum was developed by the NLD-led government, but due to the current political situation, published textbooks are not readily available in some areas, such as Ralpel. As a result, teachers in the school have had to use screenshots of online texts to supplement their lessons.
