= Chhimtuipui district =

Coordinates: 22°29′24″N 92°58′48″E

- former district of India
- Location within India
- Country: India
- State: Mizoram
- Time zone: UTC+5:30 (IST)

== Administration ==
Subdivisional headquarters were at Lawngtlai and Kamalanagar (Chawngte). Chhimtuipui District was divided into four rural development blocks, namely Lawngtlai, Sangau, Tuipang and Chawngte. In November 1998 Lawngtlai District was created out of Chhimtuipui District, consisting of the Lawngtlai RD Block and the Chawngte RD Block. The remaining area of Sangau RD Block and Tuipang RD Block was still called Chhimtuipui District, but the reduced district's name was soon changed to Siaha district.

== Demographics ==
In addition to Mizo, Kuki-Chin languages spoken in southern Mizoram (Chhimtuipui District and neighboring Lunglei District) include:

- Chakma language
- Hakha Chin language
- Mara language
- Ralte language
- Bawm language
- Pangkhu language
