= Khawnglung Run =

- Directed by: Mapuia Chawngthu
- Written by: C. Lalengkima
- Starring: Alex Lalchhuankima; Zoremsangi Hnamte
- Edited by: Mapuia Chawngthu
- Music by: Kima Chhangte; Francis; Sena; Pro Scores
- Production company: Leitlang Pictures
- Release date: 23 August 2012
- Running time: 122 minutes
- Country: India
- Language: Mizo

Khawnglung Run (English: The Massacre of Khawnglung or The Raid of Khawnglung) is a 2012 Mizo-language action romantic epic film directed by Mapuia Chawngthu based on true events of the historical massacre of Khawnglung during 1856–1859. The Khawnglung village raid was one of the most famous and the greatest massacre in Mizo history.

== Cast ==
- Alex Lalchhuankima as Chala
- Zoremsangi Hnamte as Thangi
- A.Zothanpuia
- David C.Lalrinawma
- Lalthakimi
- F. Zomuankima
- Lalnunmawia
- Ms-i
- R.Saptawna
- K.Rodingliana
- Joseph Lalnuntluanga
- Rohluzuala
- Lalropuii Pachuau
- CR.Laldingliani
- P.C. Lianmawia
- C.Laldinthara

== Production ==
Filming began on 20 May 2010 and completed after three months. Major filming took place at Khawnglung Village set created on the top of Darkhuang Hill, Thenzawl, Tui Rihiau, Mat River, Nghasih Valley, Kawmzawl, Zohnuai High School compound and Pukthiang. Although filming was completed early, the processing took almost two years.

== Soundtrack ==
A music video on the original sound track 'Khawnglung Run' was released on 27 May 2012. The song was performed by C.Lalruatkima, music by Kima Chhangte and composed by LT Muana Khiangte.
