= PU =

PU, Pu, or pu may refer to:

== Organizations ==
=== Political parties ===
- Ummah Party (Indonesia) (Partai Ummat), a political party in Indonesia

== People and names ==
- Pu (Chinese surname), shared by several people
- Pu (Indian given name), shared by several people
- Pu Ling-en (born 1936), a pen name of British poet J.H. Prynne
- Pu Yen (1900–2008), Thai centenarian who lived to an age of 108
- Yingluck Shinawatra (born 1967), nicknamed Pu, Thai businesswoman and politician

== Places ==
- Pu County, in Shanxi, China
- Guinea-Bissau, a country in West Africa (NATO country code PU)
- Province of Pesaro and Urbino, a province in the Marche region of Italy
- Punjab, India, a state in northern India (postal code PU)

== Universities ==
=== In India ===
- Panjab University, Chandigarh, a university in India
- Patna University, a university in Bihar, India
- Pondicherry University, a central university in Puducherry, India

=== In the United States ===
- Parker University, a university in Dallas, Texas, United States
- Point University, a university in West Point, Georgia, United States
- Princeton University, a university in Princeton, New Jersey, United States
- Purdue University, a university in West Lafayette, Indiana, United States

=== In other countries ===
- Purbanchal University, a university in Biratnagar, Nepal
- University of the Punjab, a public university in Lahore, Pakistan
- University of the Punjab, Gujranwala, a public university in Gujranwala, Pakistan
- University of Plovdiv, a public university in Plovdiv, Bulgaria
- Prešov University, a public university in Prešov, Slovakia
- Providence University, a university in Taichung, Taiwan

== Science and technology ==
- Plutonium, symbol Pu, a chemical element
- Processing unit, an electronic circuit that performs operations on some external data source
- Polyurethane, a common type of plastic
- pu, a label in the per-unit system of power systems analysis
- PU learning, a collection of semisupervised techniques in machine learning
- PU leather or artificial leather, a material made with polyurethane
- PU resistor, a pull-up resistor
- PU scope, a sniper scope of Soviet origin
- Power unit, component that powers a machine, a vehicle, or a train. Almost equivalent to an engine.

== Other uses ==
- Pu (Taoism), early Taoist metaphor for the natural state of humanity
- PU, an abbreviation for Proto-Ukrainian, an aspect of the Old East Slavic language
- pu, the Toki Pona name for the book Toki Pona: The Language of Good
- "Pu", a song by Arca from Kick IIIII
- pū, the sea snail Charonia tritonis
- PU, an abbreviation of Power Unlimited, a Dutch video games magazine
- PU, the projective unitary group
- Pu (kana), in syllabic Japanese script

== See also ==
- Poo (disambiguation)
- Peugh (disambiguation)
- Pue (disambiguation)
- Pew (disambiguation)
- Pugh (disambiguation)
- Pickup (disambiguation)
- Pull up (disambiguation)
