= Laizo language =

Laizo may be a dialect of:

- Falam language
- Anal language
- Hakha Chin
