= Mengpui River =

River in India

The Mengpui is a river of Mizoram, northeastern India. It rises near Lunglei town in Chhimtuipui district.
