= The Sky Is Ours =

2024 Mizo film

The Sky is Ours
- Film poster
- Directed by: Jeremy Hauhnar
- Written by: Vanneitluanga Pachuau
- Produced by: David Lalmuanpuia; Zaithanmawia
- Starring: Rinzuala; Christina Pautu
- Cinematography: John Lalremmawia
- Production company: Wayward Production
- Distributed by: Runmawi; Zonet Empai
- Release date: 2 August 2024
- Running time: 101 minutes
- Country: India
- Language: Mizo

The Sky is Ours is a 2024 Indian Mizo romantic drama film directed by Jeremy Hauhnar and written by Vanneitluanga Pachuau. It follows a romance between a popular indie band singer and a recently divorced woman. The film stars Rinzuala and Christina Pautu.

The film was noted for addressing social stigma surrounding divorced women in Mizo society and for being the first Mizo feature film to shoot scenes outside India, with filming taking place in Thailand.

== Synopsis ==
Zodina, the lead singer of the popular indie band The Hangout Boys, meets Betsie, a recently divorced woman seeking a new direction in life. Despite their age difference and contrasting circumstances, the two develop a romantic relationship as they spend more time together. The film follows their relationship as they confront social conventions and explores themes of love and second chances.

== Cast ==
- Rinzuala as Zodina
- Christina Pautu as Betsie
- Timothy Vangchhia
- Kima Hmar
- Henry Hmangaihawma

== Release ==
On 2 August 2024, the film was released digitally on Runmawi.

== Awards and nominations ==
Year	Award	Category	Recipient	Result	Ref.
2024	Mizo Film Awards 2024	Best New Actor in a leading role	Rinzuala	Nominated	
2024	Mizo Film Awards 2024	Best Sound Design	Sangliana Zadeng	Nominated	
2024	Mizo Film Awards 2024	Best Original Soundtrack	Lilac & Jacks – "Thlah lo Turin"	Nominated	
2024	Mizo Film Awards 2024	People's Choice		Nominated	

== Soundtrack ==
The Mizo song entitled "Thlah lo Turin" performed by Lilac & Jacks and written by Lilac and Bruce Pachuau is the theme song of the film. The song gained attention before the film's release and received more than 626,000 YouTube views within ten days of its upload.
