= Bawm =

Bawm or Bawm Chin may be,

- Bawm people, a people of Bangladesh, India and Myanmar
- Bawm language, their Sino-Tibetan language
