= Peugh =

Peugh may refer to:

- Peugh v. Davis 1885 U.S. Supreme Court case
- William Peugh, American architect, designed of San Francisco landmark 100 Montgomery Street

== See also ==
- Pugh (disambiguation)
- PU (disambiguation)
