= Mizo people in Myanmar =

People of Mizo descent in Myanmar

Kawlrama Mizote
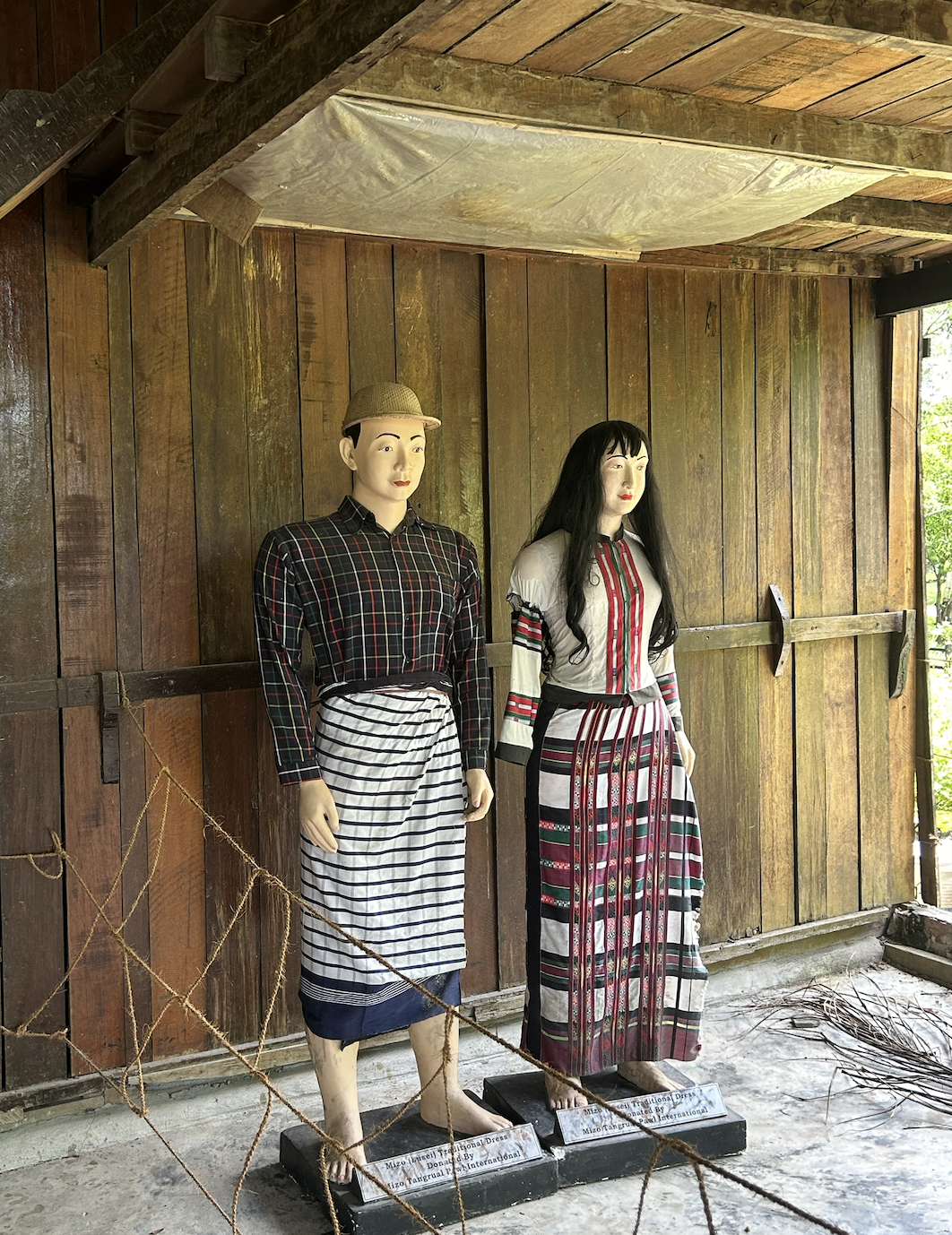
- Mizo or Lushai Chin attire shown in the National Races Village, Yangon, Myanmar.

Total population
- 400,000 (Note: It may include people that only have partial Mizo ancestry.)

Regions with significant populations
- Kalay; Khampat; Mandalay; Pyin Oo Lwin; Rihkhawthar; Tamu; Taunggyi; Yangon

Languages
- Burmese; Standard Mizo; Hmar (Northern Mizo)

Religion
- Christianity

Related ethnic groups
- Chin people; Mizo diaspora

The Lusei (Mizo) people in Myanmar, historically the Burma National Lushais (Burmese:မြန်မာနိုင်ငံရှိ လူရှည်/လူရှိုင်း(မီဇိုး)လူမျိုးများ) are Myanmar citizens with full or partial Mizo ancestry. Although various Mizo tribes have lived in Myanmar for past centuries, the first wave of Mizos migrated back to Myanmar in the mid-19th to the 20th centuries.

The Mizo people do not influence the rest of Myanmar culturally, but Mizoram, the native land of the Mizos, has helped refugees from Myanmar since 1962, after Myanmar's first coup. It was more noticeable after the 8888 Uprising in 1988 and the coup and civil war in 2021. They have also raised funds, and the Chinlung Chuak Artists, a band of Mizo and Burmese singers, fundraise for the displaced in Myanmar.

The number of Mizos is estimated to be 250,000-400,000 in Myanmar. Over 200,000 reside in the town of Kalay. They are part of the Mizo diaspora and the larger Zo community.

== History ==
The early Burmese Mizo people, historically referred to as Lu Shaing (Burmese: လူရှိုင်း), Lu Shay (Burmese: လူရှေ/လူရှည်), and Kalinkaw (Burmese: ကလင်ကော့), were known to have resided in the Kabaw Valley, along the Indo–Burmese border. Historical records suggest that during their time in the Kabaw Valley, they recognized the Burman's sovereignty over the region and allied with local forces. Notably, a 1972 Burmese encyclopedia mentions that in the year 1823, 800 Mizos joined Maha Bandula's cavalry, contributing to the defense of the Khampat area from foreign incursions, including by constructing and safeguarding defensive walls.

The first census taken in the Chin Hills occurred in 1896 and showed 20 Mizo villages with 608 houses. In 1914, another wave of Mizos migrated, led by Kapmawia from Champhai district. Most Burmese Mizos have a military background. Around the 1940s in the British Lushai Hills (present-day Mizoram), it was considered popular to join the Burmese Army. Hence, there were 500 Mizos in the Burmese Army in 1947, and that number grew to 3,000 in 1960.

C. Khuma (Challiankhuma), an Army Officer serving in Burma, wrote a tragic love story called Memiau Sanapui (Maymyo Clocktower) in 1946. It was published by the Burma Lushai Association in 1950. This tragedy was perhaps the first Mizo fiction ever printed and published outside Mizoram. Irrawaddy Luikamah (At the Bank of the Irrawaddy) by James Dokhuma was also written.

The first Mizo town in Myanmar founded by Mizo migrants is Letpankone, in Sagaing Region; in Mizo, it is known as Sainguauva khua.

In a government-led estimation in 1972, there were 83 Mizo villages with 5,736 homes, with 33,554 people, in Myanmar.

== Culture ==
Most Burmese Mizos are Christians and speak Mizo and Burmese. Chapchar Kut, a famous Mizo festival, is one of those that are celebrated publicly in Kalay.

It has introduced some Mizo dishes to Myanmar such as these:

- Sabutui
- Bài
- Samțawk kàn

== Citizenship ==
Most Mizos in Myanmar officially identify with the Chin ethnic group. However, the Anti-Fascist People's Freedom League once encouraged Mizos to come from Mizoram and to settle in Myanmar. The same was true for the Manipuris as well. Some thought that those were tactics to let the party gain votes.

== Notable Burmese Mizos ==
- Vanlal Dawla, boxer
- Zoramthanga, boxer
- Aye Nyein Thu, doctor
- Aye Aye Mu, politician
- Chaw Su Khin, singer
- Lar Dint Htar Yi, musician
- Mary Dawngi, musician
- Nway Oo
- Omomi Khiangte, musician
- SaiWanah, musician
- Sasa, politician

== See also ==
- Mizo people in Tripura
