= Bualkhaw language =

Language spoken in Burma

Bualkhaw
- Bualkhaw Chin
- Native to: Burma
- Region: Chin State
- Ethnicity: 15,000 (2023)
- Language family: Sino-Tibetan: Tibeto-Burman; Central Tibeto-Burman (?); Kuki-Chin-Naga; Kuki-Chin; Central; Lai; Bualkhaw
- Writing system: Latin

Language codes
- ISO 639-3: cbl
- Glottolog: bual1235

Bualkhaw Chin is a Kuki-Chin language in Falam Township, Chin State, Myanmar.
