= Langet language =

Kuki-Chin language

Langet
- Language family: Sino-Tibetan: Tibeto-Burman; Kuki-Chin-Mizo; Kuki-Chin; Central; Core Central; Langet

Language codes
- ISO 639-3: None (mis)
- Linguist List: qfs
- Glottolog: None

Langet is a Kuki-Chin language which is not classified precisely. It is suspected by Shafer (1955) to be a member of his "Central Core" branch but probably by migrants to Southern territory who speak a language of the Central branch.
