= Edwin Rowlands =

Welsh Christian missionary (1867–1939)

The Reverend Edwin Rowlands
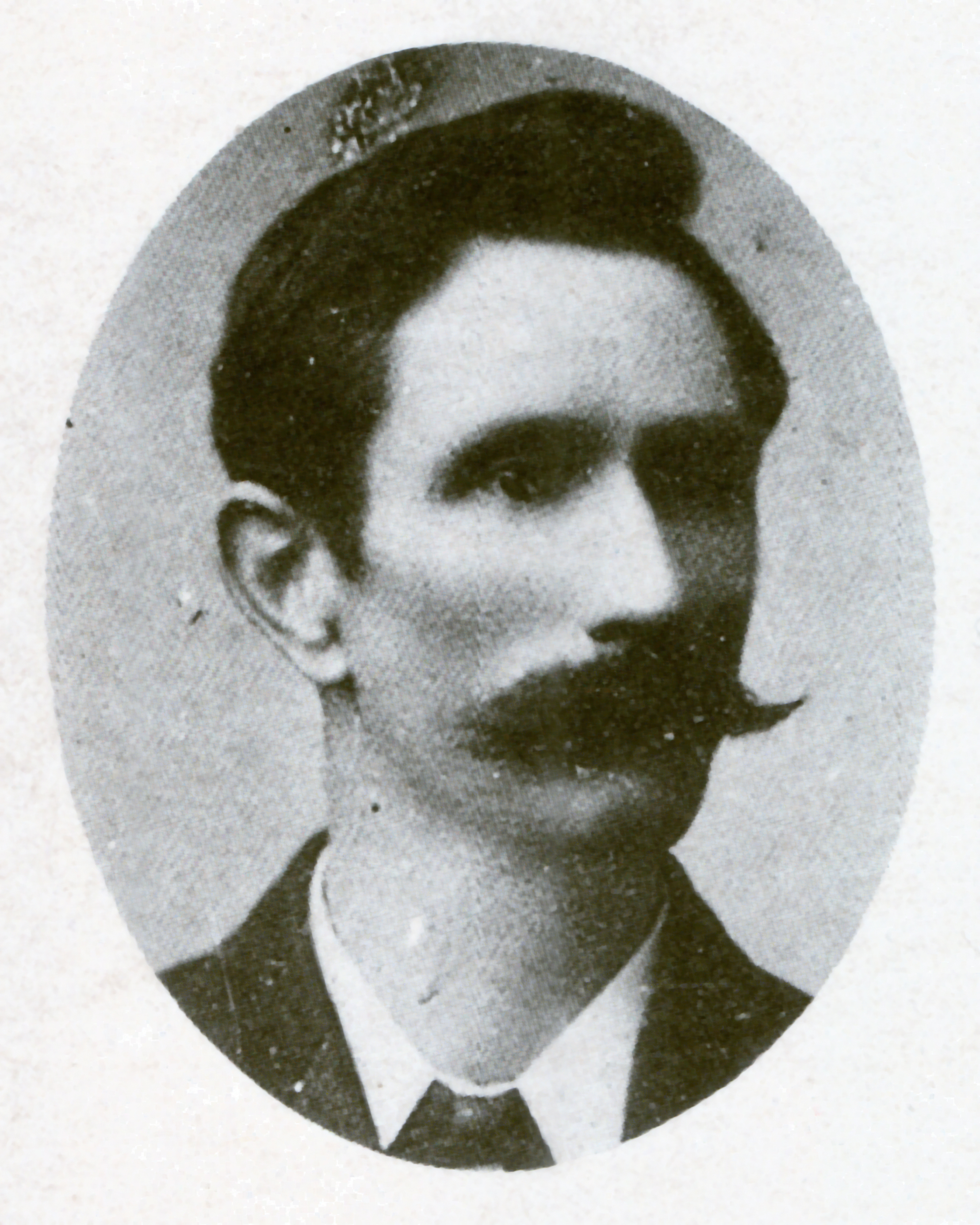
- Born: 15 March 1867; Pensarn, Abergele, Wales
- Died: 6 August 1939 (aged 72); Rangoon, Burma
- Other name: Zosapthara (to Mizo people)
- Education: B.A.
- Alma mater: Oxford University
- Occupation: Christian missionary
- Known for: Mizo hymns, literature, and education in Mizoram

Edwin Rowlands (15 March 1867 – 6 August 1939) was a Welsh Christian missionary in northeast India and Burma. He was a professional teacher, singer, composer, poet, translator and literary figure among the Mizo people. He was regarded as the most beloved of all British missionaries in Mizoram. He was more popularly known as Zosapthara. He made the major hymns in Mizo and Khumi which are still in use. He modified the original Mizo alphabet and his system became the standard in Mizo language. He created written language for Khumi people in Burma, and for Bhil people in Maharashtra. His literary works are the foundation of Mizo literature. He was the first administrator of education in Mizoram as Honorary Inspector of Schools. Despite objection from various corners he married Thangkungi, a Mizo girl.

== Early life ==
Edwin Rowlands was born in Pensarn in North Wales. He was the older of the two sons of David and Mary Rowlands. He completed BA from Oxford University. While in Oxford he joined the evangelical Oxford Group and became a born-again Christian. Due to economic hardship at time he left for America in 1883 at the age of sixteen. He worked as a schoolmaster in Texas for six years. At twenty-two, in 1889 he returned to Wales to work at Rhyl school. After teaching for two years he decided to go on a Christian mission. He started preaching and entered Bala Preparatory School (for missionaries) at Bala, Gwynedd. Then he joined Bala-Bangor Theological Seminary in 1896. He completed the course in 1898 becoming the topper in all examinations. He was selected by the Board of Calvinistic Methodist Mission to be missionary for Mizoram (then Lushai Hills), India. At the same time his brother John was also selected by the mission board for South America. Rowlands was ordained in the church assembly at Newport in 1898. The two brothers set sail from Liverpool on the same day but in opposite directions. While at the Arabian Sea, Rowlands received a tragic message that John had perished in the Atlantic Ocean in a ship wreck. It was later reported that John sacrificed himself for others by refusing to board a limited life boat. Despite his mother plea he received at Calcutta to return home, there was no turning back for Rowlands.

== Missionary career ==
=== In Mizoram ===
Rowlands, accompanied by the senior missionary David Evan Jones from Calcutta, arrived in Aizawl on 31 December 1898. The young and fresh foreigner was immediately recognised by the Mizos as "Zosapthara" (meaning "the new/fresh Mizo Sahib"). Jones automatically was named "Zosaphluia" (hlui means old) for he was the older/senior one. Eventually they were referred to only by these names among the Mizos. Rowlands was a natural linguist and soon was able to communicate in the Mizo language. It was reported that he mastered Mizo within three months. Unlike his predecessor missionaries he was a perfect adventurous type, visiting and preaching to remote and unexplored villages. Moreover, he would stay among the tribal villages as their ordinary guest, eating and sleeping as they did (except that he drank only boiled water). Further, in contrast to other missionaries he was a gifted singer and fluent in tonic solfa, which greatly attracted the natives.

Rowlands took charge of education from 1900, while church administration was under Jones. He trained his students mostly to become teachers themselves so that education and the Gospel could be spread faster. For his first experiment, he deputed his first three students Thanga, Chawnga and Tawka separately to Khawrihnim, Phulpui and Chhingchhip villages. He motivated the villagers to construct school huts and donate rice for the teachers. It was a huge success. In 1903 he persuaded the government to support his experimental schools, and accordingly the first government-supported school was opened at Khandaih village. Later the same year his other temporary schools were adopted by the government. By then the total enrolment soared to 465. He revised the original Mizo alphabets (as is used today), translated six books of the New Testament, and prepared several textbooks. He created and financed a hostel for poorer sections and orphans. Sir Bamfield Fuller, Chief Commissioner of Assam, upon his visit in February 1904 was so impressed with the performances of mission schools that he immediately ordered dissolution of all government-run schools. The Chief Commissioner had already appointed Rowlands to be the first Honorary Inspector of Schools in all Lushai Hills in 1903. From 1 April 1904 Rowlands became the authority of education, and through him government fundings were managed by the mission. He held this charge till 1907.

=== In other parts of India ===
Rowlands got the sack from Welsh Mission and left Mizoram in 1908. His first missionary work outside of Mizoram as a freelance was at Salchupra, near Silchar in Assam. After a few years he moved to Sadya, now in Arunachal Pradesh, among the Digaro Mishmi tribes. He created their alphabets and prepared their dictionary Di-Garo Mishmi dictionary, published in 1918. Around 1917–1919 he served as a substitute missionary for Swedish Alliance Mission to Maharashtra in central India (their missionary was on a long vacation). There he created the alphabets for the Bhil tribes. In 1920 he joined the Thado-Kuki Pioneer Mission (later renamed North East India General Mission or NEIGM in 1923) in Manipur and neighbouring Assam region. He was posted at Lakhipur but mostly went for field visits. He left the NEIGM on 1 April 1924.

=== In Burma ===
Rowlands worked in Burma for two separate periods. In 1913 he stayed among S'gaw people for some years, and then taught at Judson College in Rangoon for two years. He was invited back to India by Swedish Alliance Mission.

Around 1924 Rowlands, assisted by his new wife, went to Khumi people in Chin state. Within a few days he learned their language and prepared more than fifty songs. He later translated the Gospels of Luke, Mark, John and Epistle of James. He had his first convert Heng Naw in 1926. He soon established a church in Paletwa. To support his "Mission to Khumi" he himself moved to Rangoon and worked as schoolmaster at Kemmedine High School, a Chinese Christian school. His wife remained in the village to help the church, and as a trained midwife was invaluable to the natives. He used his salary to support his mission, visiting the mission field upon every vacation. After establishing 22 churches in different villages he handed his mission over to a new field of Bible Church Missionary Society in 1932.

== Controversy and marriage ==
Edwin Rowlands and D.E. Jones supported a number of poor but promising students and orphans for their education. They had a self-sufficient hostel near their bungalow. One girl named Thangkungi was the favourite of Rowlands. They made good bonds and he admittedly wanted to marry her, but was sternly objected by his missionary friends and even the Welsh Mission board. The underpinning reason could only be on racial grounds that a respectful British should marry a tribal girl. Suspicion arose in 1906 that Rowlands had immoral behaviour towards the girl. D.E. Jones went as far as setting up a regular secret surveillance team at Rowlands' residence. On 28 August 1906 an anonymous memorandum was sent by Jones to the board of directors in Liverpool that there were enough indications that Rowlands acted indecently. While in reality, members of the surveillance team testified that there were no direct evidences of immorality. Rowlands was summoned in 1907 to make his statement at Liverpool before the board. But the board delayed interview for several months. By then Jones was on vacation in Wales, and Rowlands was worried of the mission administration in Mizoram. After excruciating wait for the board, and no information, he left for Mizoram in the early 1908. He was full of confidence that his innocence would be accepted. When Jones returned to Aizawl a letter from the mission followed him, which he read in June 1908 before Rowlands and select church leaders. It was a termination of Rowlands. Rowlands packed up, handed over his hostel to Mrs Jones, and left Aizawl on 22 June 1908.

Around 1921, then widowed Thankungi and her aged mother sought Rowlands, who was stationed at Lakhipur under the North East India General Mission. It was appropriate in Mizo culture as the rest of Thangkungi's family had emigrated to Burma, and Rowlands was their closest friend. They stayed with him at the Lakhipur Mission Compound. However, Rowlands was in continuous expedition to Manipur and Burma. When he returned in December 1923, it was only to learn the eviction of his guests by the mission authority in April 1923. After submitting his elaborate report of field visits, he tendered his resignation from NEIGM on 1 April 1924, and married Thangkungi to end all controversies.

== Death and legacy ==
Edwin Rowlands died on 6 August 1939 in Rangoon in the arms of his wife Thangkungi. He died of physical exhaustion. Thangkungi returned to Peletwa among her Khumi friends, and died there in 1948.

Zosapthara Memorial Primary School was established in 2009 at Kauchhuah, Lunglei district.

Zosapthara Building is located at Synod compound, Mission Veng, Aizawl.

Zosapthara Award is instituted by Bilkhawthlir Mizo Literacy Association.

== Contributions ==
=== Prose and linguistics ===
Edwin Rowlands modified the Mizo alphabets created by J.H. Lorrain and F.W. Savidge. He corrected the phonetic symbols which became the standard Mizo language. He created alphabets and first textbooks for the Bhil people. He created the Khumi alphabets in 1925 which are still in use (with addition of two compound symbols). He was better-gifted in writing than his missionary. He was a prolific writer of essays and notes. His essays were the first in Mizo and were published in Mizo leh Vai Chanchinbu (1903–1913) and Kristian Tlangau (1912–1914).

=== Poetry ===
Rowlands was the first to compose proper poetry in Mizo. His poems covered patriotic song (Mizo kan ni lawm ilangin), anti-slavery (Thim zawi deuhin a zing), inspirational (Thil hlawtling nghal mah suh se), and devotional odes (Tui mal far te te and Ka nausenin tunge mi kawl?). He made (both translation and original composition) over a hundred Mizo devotional hymns, 96 of which survived and are still sung to the present. He remains the single most contributor to Kristian Hla Bu, the official church hymn book of Baptist and Presbyterian churches. He also composed several hymns in other languages, particularly in Khumi. His proficiency was best exemplified by an occasion on 12 August 1907 when he composed seven hymns, which are in fact one of the most complex songs yet in Mizo.

=== Books ===
Rowlands was a prolific writer. In spite of his ceaseless missionary explorations, he kept writing his diaries, articles and books. His important books are:

1. Mizo leh sâp ṭawng hma-bu mizo sap shaim = A Lushai-English primer (1903)
2. Note on St. Luke's parables in Lushai (1906)
3. Marka Evangel (1906)
4. History of India: in Lushai (1907)
5. English first reader: Lushai translation (1907)
6. Pawla tân lai (translation of the Epistles of Paul), (1907)
7. English primer: Lushai translation (1907)
8. First reader: Lushai annotations, with explanations and additional notes (1907)
9. Third reader: Lushai annotations (1908)
10. Middle reader I (1908)
11. Assam: Eastern Bengal and Assam (1908)
12. A Primer of English Grammar in Lushai (1909)
13. Bu-lâi, II (1909)
14. Khawvêl thu (with D.E. Jones) (1909)
15. Continent of Asia (with D.E. Jones) (1910)
16. Hebrea te hnena lekha-thawn (1910)
17. Isua tehkhinthute: the parables of Jesus (with D.E. Jones) (1913)
18. Thu: Mizo sapte ziak (with D.E. Jones) (1914)
19. Di-Garo Mishmi dictionary (1918)
20. History of Burma: "notes." (192?)
21. Mizo leh sâp ṭawng hmabu Mizo-sâp Siam (with D.E. Jones) (1922)
22. St. Mark in Khumi (1935)
23. Satang kahawi Marka i tajiu nai (1941)
24. Satang kahawi Luka i tajiu nai: St. Luke in Khumi (1948)
25. Jacob cha pa nai (1948)
26. Amtaw thau nai chi i ati ti sa nai (1950)

In addition he also completed the translation of the Gospel of Luke (1898) and Acts of the Apostles (1899), and also prepared other textbooks such as on geography, Mizo writing, teaching method, Khumi primer and Arithmetic Part II.
