= Pue =

Pue may refer to:

- Pue language of Papua New Guinea
- pue, the ISO 639-3 code for the Puelche language of Argentina
- W. Wesley Pue (born 1954), Canadian lawyer

PUE may refer to:

- People's Union for Economy, a pressure group in the United Kingdom
- Pneumonia of unknown etiology, monitored by the Pneumonia of unknown etiology (PUE) surveillance system
- Power usage effectiveness, the ratio of total amount of power used by the data center facility to the power delivered to IT equipment
- Poznań University of Economics, a university in Poland
- Puerto Rico, UNDP country code

== See also ==
- PU (disambiguation)
- Pew (disambiguation)
