= Thor language =

Kuki-Chin language spoken in Myanmar

Thor Chin
- Tawr Chin
- Laamtuk Thet; Ruavan Thet
- Region: Myanmar
- Ethnicity: Chin
- Native speakers: 580 (2019)
- Language family: Sino-Tibetan: Tibeto-Burman; Central Tibeto-Burman (?); Kuki-Chin-Naga; Kuki-Chin; Central; Thor Chin

Language codes
- ISO 639-3: tcp
- Glottolog: tawr1235

Thor (Thor Chin; IPA: t̪ʰɔːɹ³³), also known as Tawr (Tawr Chin), Laamtuk Thet, or Ruavan Thet, is a Kuki-Chin language spoken in two villages of Hakha Township, Chin State, Myanmar (Burma).

VanBik (2009:48) proposes the name Laamtuk Thet (from the speakers' autonym Thet), and notes that Thawr is in fact a derogatory exonym that means ‘dirty’ or ‘sour’ in Hakha. It is spoken in Laamtuk and Ruavaan villages, located about 60 miles southeast of Hakha town (VanBik 2009:48).

== Background ==
Thor is spoken by 580 people in two villages about 40 miles southeast of Hakha Town, namely Laamtuk (320 people) and Ruavan (260 people). Speakers often refer to their language as the Laamtuk language or Ruavan language.

Other spellings include Tawr, Torr, and Thawr. Another name is Tet, also spelled Thet.
