= Pangkhu language =

Kuki-Chin language spoken in Bangladesh

Pangkhua
- Pangkhu
- Native to: Bangladesh and India
- Region: Chittagong Hill Tracts (Bilaichari, Jorachari, Barkal & Baghaichari districts and parts of Rangamati district) and Mizoram (Chamdur valley and Adjacent hills in Lawngtlai district, Tlabung and West Phaileng subdivision)
- Ethnicity: Pangkho
- Native speakers: 3,200 in Bangladesh (2012) unknown number in India
- Language family: Sino-Tibetan: Tibeto-Burman; Central Tibeto-Burman (?); Kuki-Chin-Naga; Kuki-Chin; Central; Pangkhua

Language codes
- ISO 639-3: pkh
- Glottolog: pank1249
- ELP: Pankhu

Pangkhua (Pangkhu), or Paang, is a Kuki-Chin language primarily spoken in Bangladesh and India. Most speakers of Pangkhu are bilingual in Bengali or Mizo in the respective countries and most education in Pangkhu is conducted in that language.

Since there is essentially no literature in Pangkhua, other than oral folk tales and songs, the Pangkhua community members use Lushai literature. There are minimal language differences between Pangkhua, Tlanglau, Falam Chin, Bawm and Mizo.

== Dialects ==
The dialects of the two main communities that use Pangkhu, Bilaichari and Konglak, share 88% of their basic vocabulary. Residents of Pangkhua Para refer to their village as Dinthar (IPA: /d̪int̪ʰar/; from Mizo d̪in 'stay' and Mizo and Pangkua t̪ʰar 'new')

== Phonology ==
Pangkhu has twenty-one consonant phonemes:

Pangkhu consonants
		Bilabial		Labio-dental	Dental		Alveolar	Post-alveolar	Palatal	Velar		Glottal
		plain	asp.	Labio-dental	plain	asp.	Alveolar	Post-alveolar	Palatal	plain	asp.	Glottal
Stop	Voiceless	p	pʰ ⟨ph⟩		t̪ ⟨t⟩	t̪ʰ ⟨th⟩				k	kʰ ⟨kh⟩	(ʔ)
Stop	Voiced	b			d̪ ⟨d⟩							
Fricative	Voiceless			f			s~ʃ					h~ʔ
Fricative	Voiced			v			z					
Affricate								t͡s ⟨ch⟩				
Rhotic							r					
Nasal		m					n			ŋ ⟨ng⟩		
Glide		w							j ⟨y⟩			
Lateral							l					

However, only unaspirated voiceless stops, /h/, /r/, /m/, /n/, /ŋ/, and /l/ may occur at syllable coda. When stops occur in coda position, they are not audibly released. The glottal fricative /h/ may be deleted syllable-initially.

There are also seven vowel phonemes:

	Front	Central	Back
High	i		u
Close-mid	e		
Mid		ə	
Open-mid			ʌ
Low	ɑ		ɒ

The vowel [æ] serves as an allophone of /e/ and [o] serves as an allophone of /u/. Vowel length contrasts occur only in closed syllables and diphthongs. There are 9 diphthongs, these being /ɑi/, /ɑu/, /ei/, /eu/, /əu/, /ou/, /iɑ/, /uɑ/, and /ui/. Diphthongs and long vowels are monophthongized following another syllable.

The basic syllable structure of Pangkhu is (C)(L)V(X), with L being a lateral consonant and X being a coda consonant.

There are two tones: a high tone and low tone.

== Morphology ==
=== Derivational affixes ===
==== Diminutive and augmentative ====
Augmentative -pui and diminutive -te can be affixed to kinship terms in order to denote relative age or size.

Pangkhua diminutives and augmentatives
Root	Gloss	Diminutive	Augmentative
pɑ	father	pɑte 'father's younger brother'	pɑpui 'father's elder brother'
nu	mother	nute 'mother's younger sister'	nupui 'mother's elder sister'
thing	tree	thingte 'tree-plant'	thingpui 'big tree'
tui	water	tuite 'small river'	tuipui 'river'
kut	hand	kutte 'little finger'	kutpui 'thumb'

==== Gender ====
The gender suffixes -pɑ and -mɑ may derive a new referent from a root, as in lɑl 'monarch', lɑlpɑ 'king, and lɑlnu 'queen'.

==== Negation ====
Negation -ləu can be suffixed to a root to denote its opposite, as in dam 'healthy' and damləu 'sick'.

=== Noun forms ===
In Pangkhua, only human nouns can be marked for plurality and only animate marked for gender. Relator nouns share a function similar to adpositions in other languages.

Relator nouns
Semantics	Form	Gloss
Locational	kiɑng	by
Locational	kung	'from, near'
Locational	lɑi	'between'
Locational	ler	'at the top'
Locational	mɑng	'in front'
Locational	nuɑi	'under'
Locational	sung	'inside'
Locational	chung	'on top'
Locational	nung	'behind, later'
Temporal	sung/hun	'during'
Directional	kɑng	'by'
Associative	ruɑl	'with'
Ablative	thɒ(k)	'from'
Benefactive	(mə)rɑng	'for'

== Bibliography ==
- Akter, Zahid (2024). A Grammar of Pangkhua. Berlin, Boston: De Gruyter Mouton. doi:10.1515/9783111387673.
