= Pew (disambiguation) =

A pew is a long bench seat used for seating members of a congregation or choir in a church.

Pew may also refer to:

== Organizations ==
- Pew Research Center, an American think tank based in Washington, D.C.
- The Pew Charitable Trusts, an American non-profit organization based in Philadelphia, Pennsylvania
- Pew Center for Arts & Heritage
  - Pew Fellowships in the Arts, program of The Pew Center for Arts & Heritage
- Pew Center on Global Climate Change

== People ==
- PewDiePie (born 1989), Swedish YouTuber
- J. Howard Pew (1882–1971), American philanthropist and president of Sunoco
- John Pew (born 1956), American racing driver
- Joseph Newton Pew (1848–1912), founder of Sun Oil Company and philanthropist
- Joseph N. Pew Jr. (1886–1963), American industrialist and influential member of the Republican Party
- Richard Pew (1933–2025), American research psychologist and Olympic fencer
- Tracy Pew (1957–1986), Australian musician

== Fictional characters ==
- Pepé Le Pew, an animated character depicted as a French anthropomorphic striped skunk from the Warner Bros. Looney Tunes and Merrie Melodies series of cartoons

== Other uses ==
- PEW, percussion welding
- Pew (Treasure Island), a character in the novel
- Pew, a 2020 novel by Catherine Lacey
- Peshawar International Airport (IATA code PEW), in Peshawar, Khyber Pakhtunkhwa Province, Pakistan
- Pediatric early warning signs (PEWS)
- Something said when something has an unpleasant odor
- The sound a laser gun makes, as in the name PewDiePie

== See also ==
- PewPew (disambiguation)
- PU (disambiguation)
