= Pu (Chinese surname) =

Pu is the Pinyin transcription of a number of distinct Chinese surnames, including:

- Chinese: 蒲; pinyin: Pú; Cantonese Yale: Pòuh; Pe̍h-ōe-jī: Phô, meaning "reed" or "rush". According to the Lushi, this character was adopted as a surname during the Xia dynasty by the Youhu clan (有扈氏) due to the rushes which grew in their family gardens. It is the 269th character in the Hundred Family Surnames.
- Chinese: 浦; pinyin: Pǔ; Cantonese Yale: Pòuh. This is a toponymic surname, from the Pu River (浦江) in Shandong. According to the Xingshi Kaolue (姓氏考略), descendants of Jiang Ziya who lived on the banks of the Pu River changed their surname from Jiang to Pu. It is the 318th character in the Hundred Family Surnames.
- Chinese: 濮; pinyin: Pú; Cantonese Yale: Buhk. This is also a toponymic surname, from the Pu River (濮水) in Henan; it was also used to write the name of a vassal state of the State of Qi. People with this surname spread out from there to Puyang and Hua Counties in Henan. It is the 309th character in the Hundred Family Surnames.
- Chinese: 朴; pinyin: Pǔ; Cantonese Yale: Pok; meaning Celtis sinensis (a kind of tree). This is used to write the Korean surname Park. It is pronounced "Piáo" in China.
- Chinese: 普; pinyin: Pǔ; Cantonese Yale: Pok

These surnames may also be transcribed as Poo. People with these surnames include:

== Notable people ==
=== 蒲 ===
- Pu Songling (蒲松齡; 1640–1715), Qing dynasty Chinese writer
- Pu Hua (蒲華; 1834–1911), Qing dynasty Chinese landscape painter and calligrapher
- Pao Ming Pu (蒲保明; 1910–1988), Chinese mathematician, pioneer of systolic geometry
- Pu Tiansheng (蒲添生; 1912–1996), Taiwanese sculptor
- Mu-chou Poo (蒲慕州; born 1952), Taiwanese Egyptologist
- Pu Tze-chun (蒲澤春, born 1956), Republic of China Navy admiral
- Pu Zhongjie (蒲忠杰; born 1963), Chinese businessman
- Ai-jen Poo (蒲艾真; born 1974), American labour activist
- Pu Jun Jin (蒲俊錦; born 1984), Chinese racing driver

=== 浦 ===
- Pu Wei (浦瑋; born 1980), Chinese football (soccer) player
- Pu Qiongying (浦瓊英; 1916–2009), birth name of Zhuo Lin, last wife of Chinese leader Deng Xiaoping
- Pu Zhiqiang (浦志强; born 1965), Chinese civil rights lawyer

=== 樸 ===
- Pu Shu (樸樹; born 1973), Chinese singer

=== 濮 ===
- Pu Shunqing (濮舜卿, 1902–?), Chinese screenwriter and playwright
- Pu Cunxin (濮存昕; born 1953), Chinese stage actor

=== 普 ===
- Pu Chaozhu (普朝柱; 1929–2002), Chinese Communist Party politician from Yunnan
- Pu Yixian (普译娴, born 1992), Chinese road cyclist

=== Unknown ===
- Chermaine Poo (born 1978), Malaysian actress
- Pu Yiqi (born 1981), Chinese former swimmer who competed in the 1996 Summer Olympics
- Pu Qifeng (born 1986), Chinese sport shooter
- Cliff Pu (born 1998), Canadian ice hockey player
- Sam Poo (1838–1865), Chinese bushranger in New South Wales, Australia

== See also ==
- Pu (disambiguation)
- Pu (Daoism)
- J. H. Prynne (born 1936), British poet who has published Classical Chinese poetry under the name Pú Líng'ēn (蒲龄恩)
- Andrew H. Plaks (born 1945), American sinologist who uses the Chinese name Pǔ Āndí (浦安迪)
