= David Evan Jones (missionary) =

Baptist missionary in India (1870–1947)

The Reverend David Evan Jones
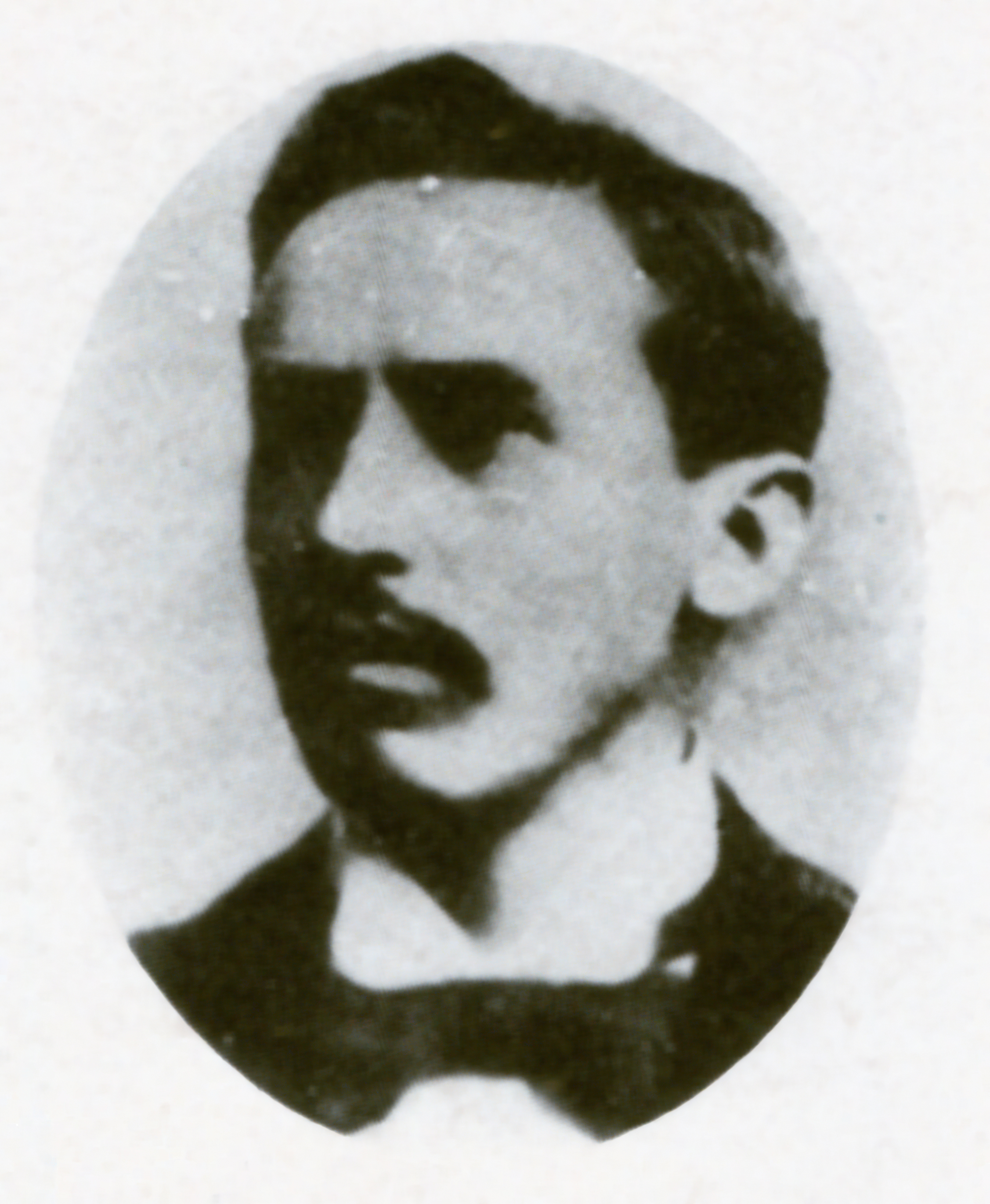
- Born: 15 February 1870; Brynmelyn, Llandderfel, Wales
- Died: 10 August 1947 (aged 77); Prestatyn, Wales
- Other name: Zosaphluia
- Citizenship: Wales
- Occupations: Missionary, Pastor
- Spouse: Katherine Ellen Williams (née Johnson)
- Children: Alwyn (1)
- Religion: Christianity
- Church: Baptist
- Ordained: 1900

David Evan Jones, Mizo name Zosaphluia (15 February 1870 – 10 August 1947), was a British missionary to the Mizo people in the Lushai Hills, what is now Mizoram, India.

== Biography ==
Jones was born at Brynmelyn, Llandderfel and educated at Bala Grammar School, then the Liverpool Institute, Bala College and the Presbyterian United Theological College, Aberystwyth. He was pastor of a church in Bettws, Montgomeryshire, for two years before being formally ordained into the English Baptists in 1897 and sailing for India on 26 June of that year. He arrived at Aizawl, in the Lushai Hills, two months later on 31 August.

In 1904, he married Katherine Ellen Johnson, at Sylhet (now Bangladesh), and they had a son Alwyn. The Joneses retired to Britain after 30 years in Mizoram in 1927 and lived in Liverpool and Prestatyn. David died in Prestatyn, on 10 August 1947, aged 77. Katherine died on 20 May 1950.

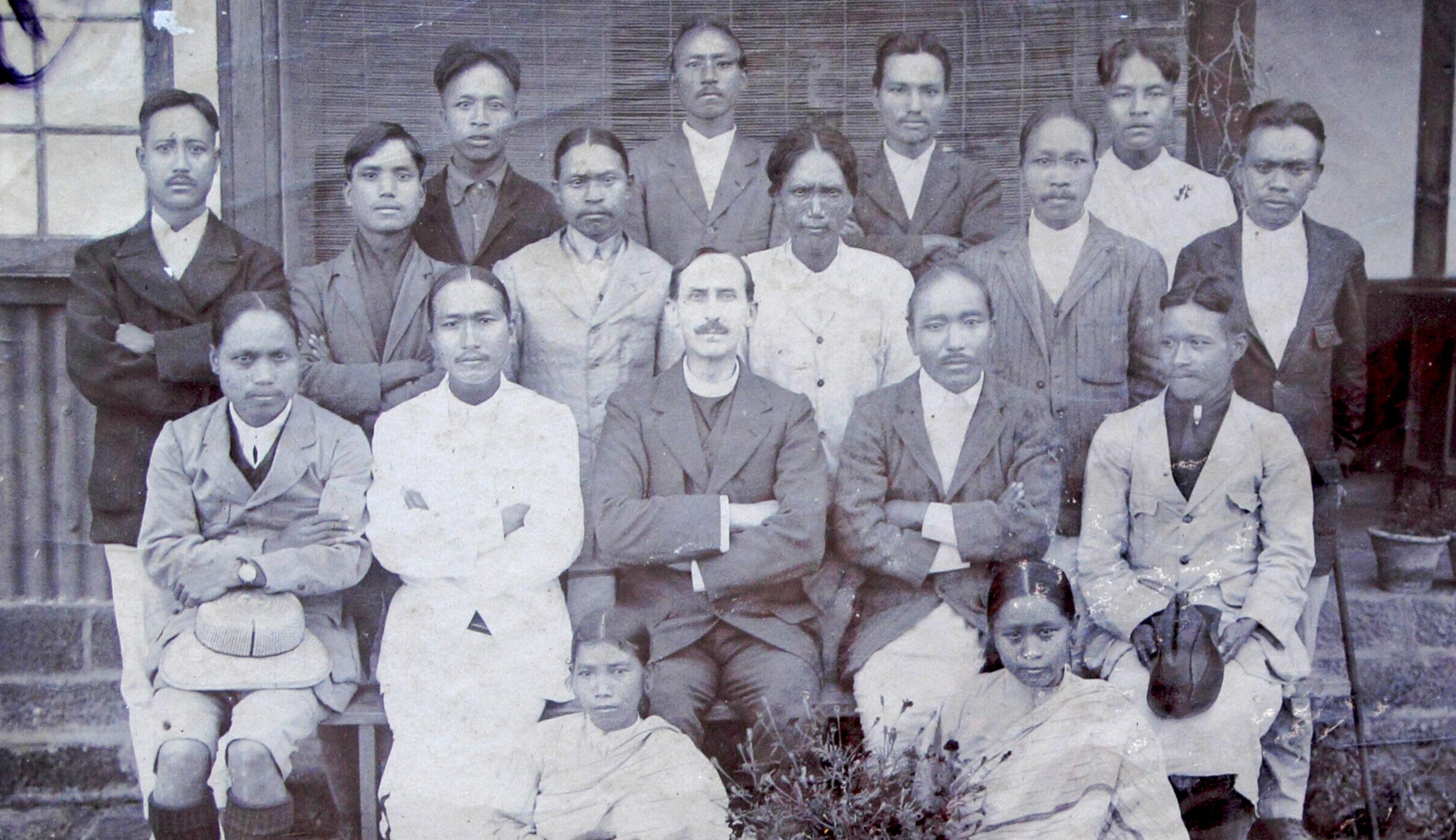
Rev. D. E. Jones with Aizawl church workers in 1922

== Mizo language ==
Jones learnt the Mizo language from fellow missionaries James Herbert Lorrain and Fred W. Savidge who had devised the Lushai language alphabet. He was part of a team translating the Bible into the local Lakher and Lushai languages.

== See also ==
- Baptist Church of Mizoram
- Mizoram Presbyterian Church
