= Mizo diaspora =

People of Mizo descent residing outside of Mizoram, India

Mizo diaspora Ram Danga Mizote
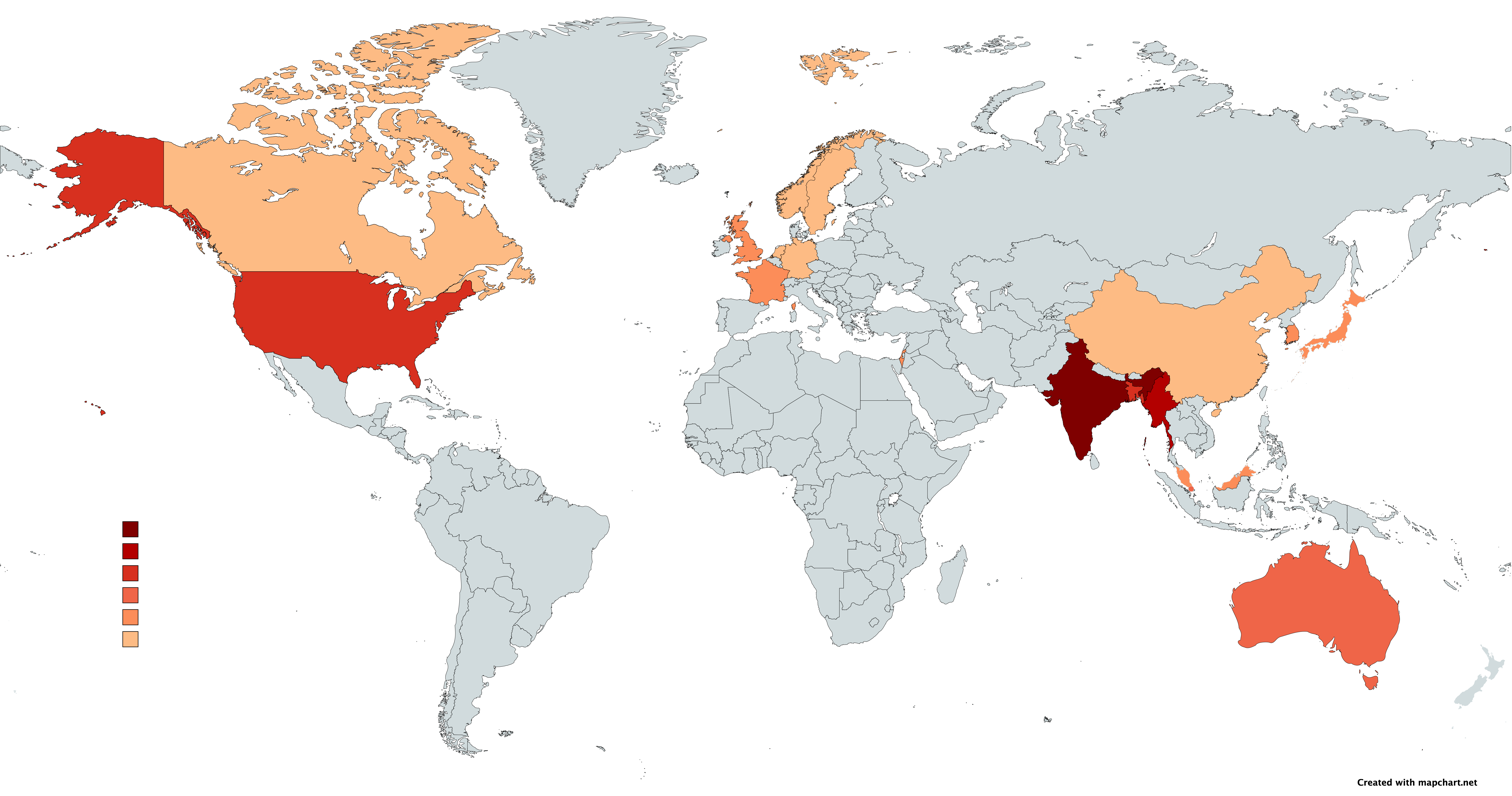

Total population
- 200,000+
- India (outside of Mizoram): 107,603+ (2011)
- Myanmar: 300,000 (2010)
- United States: 50,000
- Singapore: 20,000
- Israel: 5,000
- Malaysia: 3,000 (2011)
- China: 900 (including Taiwan)
- Netherlands: 35
- Canada: N/A
- Germany: N/A
- Sweden: N/A

Languages
- Standard Mizo; Hmar · Lakher

Religion
- Christianity · Judaism in Israel.

Related ethnic groups
- Mizo, Zo

The Mizo diaspora consists of Mizo people or people of Mizo descent residing outside Mizoram, their original land.

== Myanmar ==
Mizo people migrated to Myanmar during the 19th and the 20th centuries because of the demand and the popularity of joining the Burmese Army and other factors. By 1972, there were over 30,000 Mizos in Myanmar.

== United States ==
The first Mizos to arrive in the United States was the family of Pu Darrikhuma from Champhai, which came in the 1960s to study theology. During the 1990 and the 2000s, Mizo immigration to America skyrocketed. Mizos are primarily concentrated in Indianapolis, Tulsa, and Washington, DC. Most of them are Burmese Mizos.

In 1985, the Mizos in America founded the Mizo Society of America (MSU) to preserve their culture and language. It has since organised events like Chapchar Kut and Miss Chapchar Kut.

== Israel ==
The Bnei Menashe are a group of self-claimed Jews of Mizo ancestry. In early 1989, over 100 members of the Bnei Menashe migrated to Israel, which was the first batch. During the 2023 Gaza war, over 1,000 Bnei Manashe were said to be displaced, with one killed.

== Others ==
During the First World War, 2,100 Mizo men were taken by the British Army to France to fight for the British Empire.
