= PewPew =

PewPew may refer to:

- PewPew (video game), a 2009 game by French developer Jean-François Geyelin
- PewPew (streamer), Vietnamese online streamer
