= Lai languages =

Southeast Asian language

Lai
- Native to: India, Myanmar, Bangladesh
- Region: Mizoram, Chin State, Chittagong Hill Tracts
- Ethnicity: Lai people
- Speakers: Native: 170,000 (2017); L2: 40,000 (2013)
- Language family: Sino-Tibetan: Kuki-Chin; Central; Lai

Language codes
- ISO 639-3: cnh
- Glottolog: laic1236

The Lai languages are various Central Kuki-Chin languages spoken by the Lai people. They include “ Laiṭong” (Falam Chin) spoken in Falam district, Laiholh (Hakha Chin) spoken around the Haka (Hakha/Halkha) capital of Chin State in Burma (Myanmar) and in the Lawngtlai district of Mizoram, India. In Bangladesh, a related language is spoken by the Bawm people. Other Lai languages are Mi-E (including Khualsim), and the Zokhua dialect of Hakha Lai spoken in Zokhua village.

== Grammar ==
Deletion of the final consonant can be observed here in stem II. However, this is irregular as most verbs usually revive or gain a consonant in stem II. This stem is used to indicate the distant future tense, subjunctive mood, cohortative mood, hortative mood, jussive mood and more.
