= Aye Nyein Thu =

Burmese doctor (born 1995)

Aye Nyein Thu (Burmese: အေးငြိမ်းသူ, romanized: Ayyngyaaim Suu; born c. 1995), also known as A Nyein, is a Burmese doctor known for her voluntary work providing medical care to internally displaced people in Chin State, Myanmar. For her work, she was recognised as one of the BBC's 100 Women of 2022.

== Career ==
Aye Nyein Thu qualified as a doctor in 2020. In February 2021, during the Myanmar coup d'état that saw the democratically elected National League for Democracy being deposed by the Burmese military, the Tatmadaw, Aye Nyein Thu, alongside other medical professionals, provided medical care to injured civilians and protesters in Mandalay.

Later that year, Aye Nyein Thu travelled to Mindat Township, Chin State; at that time, the town and the surrounding area only had two working doctors. She set up a makeshift hospital with an operating theatre in order to provide medical care to Mindat residents and nearby villagers, as well as for camps of internally displaced people. The hospital also provides outreach work to isolated communities and those who cannot afford to travel to Mindat for medical care.

In September 2021, the military junta accused Aye Nyein Thu of "inciting violence" and supporting the People's Defence Force, an anti-junta militant group. Three volunteers were arrested after attempting to deliver medical supplies to Aye Nyein Thu; she reported that the military seized an X-ray machine, an anaesthesia machine, an oximeter, and medicines, while the junta alleged that she had been delivered weapons, ammunition, and money, which she intended to give to the Chinland Defence Force, a local insurgent group. The junta have accused Aye Nyein Thu of working for Zaw Wai Soe, the health minister of the National Unity Government of Myanmar, the Burmese government-in-exile, and have called on residents of Mindat to arrest her. Aye Nyein Thu has also been accused by the military of misusing donations given to her hospital by giving them to anti-military groups; she has disputed this and has said that any financial irregularities were as a result of her lack of administrative skills.

In December 2021, Aye Nyein Thu's hospital in Mindat was raided and damaged by the Burmese military, requiring it to close for several months while it underwent restructuring. The hospital reopened in 2022.

== Recognition ==
In 2022, Aye Nyein Thu was named as one of that year's 100 Women by the BBC for her work providing healthcare to internally displaced people in Myanmar.
