= Pu Yen =

Yen Kaewmanee (Thai: เย็น แก้วมณี; RTGS: Yen Kaeomani) or Pu Yen (Thai: ปู่เย็น; RTGS: Pu Yen "Grandpa Yen"), was a famous centenarian who lived to an age of 108. The Thai Muslim man was known for his self-sufficient and economical way of living. His lifestyle embodied King Bhumibol Adulyadej's philosophy on self-sufficiency. The elderly man made his living fishing from the Phetchaburi River in Phetchaburi, Thailand. He sold the fish to locals at inexpensive prices in exchange for other necessities. For many years until his death, he refused offers of free food, preferring to live in his small boat.

== Biography ==
In 1993, Pu Yen's wife died. That's when he decided to save on rent by living in a small houseboat in Phetchaburi River. He lived on one small fish each day. If there were extra fish caught, he would sell them at inexpensive prices to locals.

In 2004, Pu Yen became famous when a documentary "Khon Kon Khon" was made about his life and nationally televised. In addition, he was officially recognized by Queen Sirikit and given a covered fiberglass boat on his 105th birthday.

Visitors who talked to him said that although he received many guests, he was always welcoming and cheerful to them. He maintained a positive attitude towards life and was a role model of self-sufficiency to many Thais.

Although Pu Yen lived in relative peace, he suffered a setback when thieves stole US$2,060 in cash from his small boat.

Before his death, he lived a quiet life on his boat under the Lamyai (longan) Bridge in Phetchaburi city. The place where he used to live is marked by a small landing with a small light bulb suspended from a tree.

After his death at age 108 on 12 October 2008 from natural causes, he was buried in a local Phetchaburi mosque and the boat was donated to a local museum in the province.

== Impact ==
Pu Yen's life and death highlighted the plight of many elderly people in Thailand without adequate medical care and attention. Following his death, Thailand's Health Minister Chalerm Yubamrung issued orders for special check-up facilities for the elderly which would shorten the waiting time for receiving health care. Also, the Health Department chief Narongsak Ankhasuwapala has suggested that a club for the elderly be made available in every tambon. Currently, there are over 4,000 registered centenarians in Thailand.

== Quotations ==
Pu Yen's view on self-sufficiency:

                 "Look at the shellfish...with no hands and no feet
                 Yet they manage to survive...
                 What about...people with hands and feet
                 If they can't survive...shouldn't they be ashamed of the shellfish?"

                 "If there is food, then I eat...if there isn't any, then I don't
                 I don't ask for food from anybody else...
                 It’s hard to find people who die from hunger…
                 If they are not sick or unwell."

His view on selling and buying:

                 "Don't sell things at high prices...then the customers will have an easier time
                 I sell things cheaply. Go ahead and take them.
                 Buy enough so you will have a full pot of curry (food)."

His view on charities:

                 "I can eat free food...but I'd rather not
                 I don't want to bother anybody...no thanks...I'd be too ashamed
                 Vendors buy and sell things...
                 They need to cook. They need to clean."

His view on death:

                 "Life is like a bridge.
                 There is up and there is down.
                 There is high and there is low.
                 In the end...there is death."
