= Pugh (disambiguation) =

Pugh is a surname. Pugh may also refer to:

- Pugh Island, Nunavut, Canada
- Mount Pugh, Washington, United States
- Pugh Shoal, South Georgia
- 70446 Pugh, an asteroid
- Pugh House (disambiguation), various buildings on the National Register of Historic Places

== See also ==
- Pugh matrix, a decision-making method
