= Central Kuki-Chin languages =

Branch of the Kuki-Chin languages

Central Kuki-Chin
- Central Chin
- Geographic distribution: Myanmar and Northeast India
- Ethnicity: Mizo and Chin
- Linguistic classification: Sino-Tibetan: Tibeto-Burman; Central Tibeto-Burman (?); Kuki-Chin–Naga; Kuki-Chin; Central Kuki-Chin

Language codes
- Glottolog: cent2330 (Central Kuki-Chin)

Central Kuki-Chin is a branch of the Kuki-Chin languages. Central Kuki-Chin languages are spoken primarily in Mizoram, India and in Hakha Township and Falam Township of Chin State, Myanmar.

== Official use ==
Mizo is the official language of Mizoram State, India.

== Classification ==
VanBik (2009:23) classifies the Central Kuki-Chin languages as follows.

Central Kuki-Chin

- Pangkhua?
- Laamtuk Thet (Tawr): Laamtuk, Ruavaan dialects
- Lai languages
  - Hakha cluster: Halkha, Farrawn, Thantlang, Mi-E, Zokhua
  - Falam cluster: Bawm, Bualkhaw, Laizo, Lente, Khualsim, Khuangli, Sim, Tlaisun, Zanniat
- Mizo languages
  - Mizo cluster: Fanai, Hualngo, Lusei, Khiangte, Renthlei
  - Hmar cluster: Hmar

VanBik (2009) is unsure about the classification of Pangkhua, and tentatively places it within Central Kuki-Chin.

== Sound changes ==
VanBik (2009) lists the following sound changes from Proto-Kuki-Chin to Proto-Central Chin.

- Proto-Kuki-Chin *k(ʰ)r-, *p(ʰ)r- > Proto-Central Chin *t(ʰ)r-
- Proto-Kuki-Chin *k(ʰ)l-, *p(ʰ)l- > Proto-Central Chin *t(ʰ)l-
- Proto-Kuki-Chin *y- > Proto-Central Chin *z-

== See also ==
- Lai languages
