= Mizo alphabet =

Modern writing system for the Mizo language

Mizo alphabet Mizo hawrâwp
- Script type: Alphabet
- Creator: Frederick William Savidge, James Herbert Lorrain
- Languages: Mizo

Related scripts
- Parent systems: Egyptian hieroglyphs: Proto-Sinaitic; Phoenician alphabet; Greek alphabet; Latin alphabet; Hunterian transliteration; Mizo alphabet
- Child systems: Hmar alphabet, Mara alphabet, Paite alphabet

The Mizo alphabet (Mizo: Mizo hawrâwp, lit. 'Mizo letters') is the modern writing script for the Mizo language. It uses the Latin script based on the Hunterian transliteration originally developed by F.W. Savidge and J.H. Lorrain.

== History ==
The foundations of the Mizo alphabet can be traced back to the work of Sir William Jones and Dr. John Wilson, who adapted the Latin script for writing the Mizo language. Influenced by Sydney Endle's methods and adopting the Hunterian System of Orthography, they created an early version of the Mizo alphabet in the 19th century.

In 1893, J.H. Lorrain refined the alphabet during his time in Silchar. He introduced a new alphabet with 23 letters, which included a blend of vowels, consonants, and digraphs. The 1893 version of the alphabet was as follows:

- å, a, b, d, e, f, g, h, i, j, k, l, m, n, o, p, r, s, t, u, v, z, ch

This alphabet was used in the translation of the biblical passage the Prodigal Son (Luke 15:11–32) in 1896. An example from this translation reads:

1893 Mizo letters

11. Mî tûinemå fápá pahnih a nê.
12. A naupang zåk-in a pá hnena "Kapá, rô ka chan min pe råh" a tî a.
16. Tin, a sum an pahnih a hnen a shem a.
Englô kåm vok-in an ê khá, ani påh-in ê pui a du em em a,
tuma-in engma an pe shî lô va.
24. Tin, hlimtak-in an om tan – tá a.

Modern Mizo letters

11. Mi tuin emaw fapa pahnih a nei.
12. A naupang zâwkin a pa hnênah, ‘Ka pa, ro ka chan min pe rawh,’ a ti a.
16. Tin, a sum chu an pahnih hnen a sem a.
Englo kâwm vawkin an ei kha, ani pawhin ei pui a duh êm êm a;
tuma'n eng mah an pe si lo va.
24. Tin, hlim takin an awm ṭan ta a.

In 1898, J.H. Lorrain's Grammar and Dictionary of the Lushai Language was published. By this time, the alphabet had been expanded to 24 letters:

- a, aw, b, ch, d, e, f, g, h, i, j, k, l, m, n, o, p, r, s, t, ṭ, u, v, z

In addition to the letters used in the 1893 version, this alphabet included new vowel sounds and consonants. However, some letters, such as g and j, remained unused in the Mizo language and were kept for completeness.

Lorrain's work was further refined in 1940 when his Mizo Dictionary was published. The final Mizo alphabet consisted of 23 letters, with one important change: the letter ng was added to represent the "ng" sound, which had previously been written as an "n" and a "g". J was removed from the alphabet, as it was not used in the language. The final Mizo alphabet became:

- a, aw, b, ch, d, e, f, g, h, i, k, l, m, n, o, p, r, s, t, ṭ, u, v, z, ng

Edwin Rowlands, a Welsh missionary and scholar, joined the Mizo language efforts after learning the language. He felt that Lorrain's alphabet was insufficient for fully capturing the sounds of Mizo. In 1901, Rowlands published the second edition of his Mizo Zir Tirna Bu (Mizo Language Book), which included the 25 letters used in the current Mizo alphabet:

- a, aw, b, ch, d, e, f, g, ng, h, i, j, k, l, m, n, o, p, r, s, t, ṭ, u, v, z

== Letter names and pronunciation ==
Mizo alphabet
Letter	Name (when pronounced)	
Letter	Northern	Southern
A, a	á	á
Aw, aw	áw	áw
B, b	bí	bí
Ch, ch	cháw	cháw
D, d	dí	dí
E, e	é	é
F, f	éfì	éfì
G, g	ék	jí
Ng, ng	éng	énjí
H, h	éihchhì	héihchhì
I, i	í	í
J, j	jé	jé
K, k	ké	ké
L, l	él	él
M, m	ém	ém
N, n	én	én
O, o	ó	ó
P, p	pí	pí
R, r	ár	ár
S, s	ésì	ésì
T, t	tí	tí
Ṭ, ṭ	ṭí	ṭí
U, u	ú/iú	ú
V, v	ví	ví
Z, z	zét/zí	zét
