= Bawm language =

Sino-Tibetan language spoken in Bangladesh, India, Myanmar

Bawm
- Banjogi
- Native to: Bangladesh, India, Myanmar
- Region: Rangamati and Bandarban
- Ethnicity: Bawm
- Native speakers: c. 16,000 (2004–2011)
- Language family: Sino-Tibetan: Tibeto-Burman; Central Tibeto-Burman (?); Kuki-Chin-Naga; Kuki-Chin; Central; Lai; Bawm

Language codes
- ISO 639-3: bgr
- Glottolog: bawm1236
- ELP: Bawm Chin

Bawm or Bawm Zo, also known as Banjogi, is a Kuki-Chin language primarily spoken in Bangladesh. It is also spoken in adjacent regions of Northeast India and Myanmar. The Bawms that live on the Chittagong Hill Tracts of Bangladesh call their settlements "Bawmram", which literally means an area or location inhabited by Bawms.

In Mizoram, India, Bawm is spoken in Chhimtuipui district, Lunglei district, and Aizawl district (Ethnologue). It is also spoken in the states of Tripura and Assam.

== General information ==
Most of the Zohnahthlak communities live in Rangamati and Bandarban districts of Chittagong division in Bangladesh, with most of the Bawm community residing in the Bethel Para in Ruma subdistrict and Thanci subdistrict of the Bandarban district. Also, the Bawm reside in the Rangamati Sadar and Barkal and Bilaichari subdistricts of the Rangamati district.

Bawm language is fairly developed and contains a good amount of literature including dictionaries, religious texts, historical texts, folk stories and books such as short stories and science fiction. However, the Bawm language is at risk for endangerment. One way in which the language can prosper is through the use of multilingual education programs to ensure that the Bawm community as a whole has sufficient resources to pass the language to the next generation. The use of multilingual education programs requires the community to be educated in what types of books and literature to use.

In 1981, around 7,000 Bawms inhabited the hills of southeastern Bangladesh. In 2004, around 5,000 Bawm inhabited India, with a population in all countries totaling around 16,000. In 2011, 10,000 Bawms inhabited the Chittagong Hill Tracts of Bangladesh and 1,500 Bawm inhabited Myanmar. The endangerment status of the Bawm language in India and Myanmar is 6B and in Bangladesh is 5 (developing). The language is threatened severely in India and Myanmar as the number of speakers continues to decline. In Bangladesh, the language is stable but its speakers in numbers are not increasing.
