= Falam language =

Language spoken in Burma

Falam
- Lai
- Lai ṭong
- Native to: Burma, India
- Region: West Burma, North East India
- Ethnicity: Chin
- Native speakers: (70,000 in Burma cited 1983); 40,000 in India (2011 Census)
- Language family: Sino-Tibetan: Tibeto-Burman; Central Tibeto-Burman (?); Kuki-Chin-Naga; Kuki-Chin; Central; Lai; Falam
- Dialects: Zanniat; Laizo; Zahau; Tlaisun; Khualsim; Lente; Tapong; Sim; Torr; Ngawn
- Writing system: Latin

Language codes
- ISO 639-3: Either: cfm – Falam Chin cnw – Ngawn Chin
- Glottolog: fala1243 Falam ngaw1239 Ngawn
- ELP: Falam Chin

Falam Chin (also known as Lai) is a Kuki-Chin language in Falam Township, Chin State, Myanmar.

Falam Chin is closely related to most Central Chin languages, especially Hakha Chin. The Falam people are primarily Christian and have translated the Bible into Falam Chin.

== Dialects ==
Ethnologue lists the following dialects of Falam:

- Tlaisun (Shunkla, Sunkhla, Taishon, Tashom, Tashon)
- Laizo (Laiso, Laizao, Laizo-Shimhrin)
- Zahao (Lyen-Lyem, JaHau Yahow, Zahau, Zahau-Shimhrin, Za-How)
- Sim

Falam takes its name from a village, founded by the Tlaisun (in English, 'Tashon') tribe, and Tashon was the original language spoken in Falam. Falam grew in population from the surrounding tribes from Sunthla (also 'Sunkhla'), Sim and Zahau (also 'Zahao') that created a new language based on these three tribes, very different from the Tlaisun language. This language was later popularly known as Laizo. Laizo was recorded as the first language used in the official radio broadcasting dialect of Chin in Myanmar. In order to be inclusive in Laizo, the name was later changed to Falam, although its official name is still Laizo.

Ethnologue reported the following speaker populations of Falam dialects in 1983: 9,000 Taisun, 16,000 Zanniat, 7,000 Khualsim, 4,000 Lente, 14,400 Zahau, 18,600 Laizo.

== Phonology ==
The Falam language has five spoken vowels, but in writing, six are used. Of the five spoken, three of them, /u/, /a/, and /ɔ/ are spoke from the back of the mouth, /i/ is spoken from the top of the mouth, and /e/ is spoken from the middle. /ɔ/ can be pronounced as aw or o.

== Writing system ==
A written script for Falam (Laizo) was created in 1924 by Rev. Dr. Herbert Cope. Falam Chin is written using the Latin script, with the exception of the letters Q, Y, J and X. The consonants ṭ (t with dot), ng (Guttural sound), and aw vowel (IPA [ɔː] or [ɑː]) are frequently used in both Chin literature and speaking.

This is a sample of written Falam Chin:

A hmaisabik ah Pathian in lei le van a seemsuah. Lei cu pianhmang le hmuithlam zianghman a rak nei lo.

— "Chin (Falam) Language". LM Languages.
Translation:

In the beginning God created heaven and earth. The earth was formless and empty, and darkness covered the deep water.
