= Hakha Chin =

Kuki-Chin language of Chin State, Myanmar and Mizoram, India

- Laiholh
- Native to: Myanmar, India
- Ethnicity: Chin
- Native speakers: 300,000 (2011–2024)
- Language family: Sino-Tibetan: Tibeto-Burman; Central Tibeto-Burman (?); Kuki-Chin-Naga; Kuki-Chin; Central; Lai; Hakha Chin
- Writing system: Latin; Mon–Burmese

Language codes
- ISO 639-3: cnh
- Glottolog: haka1240
- ELP: Hakha Chin

Hakha Chin, or Laiholh, is a Kuki-Chin language spoken by nearly 300,000 people, mostly in Myanmar. In Mizoram, the language is recognized as Pawi. The total figure includes 2,000 Zokhua and 60,100 Hakha speakers. The speakers are largely concentrated in Chin State in western Myanmar and Mizoram in eastern India, with a small number of speakers in south-eastern Bangladesh.

== Distribution ==
The Hakha Chin (Lai) speakers are largely in Chin State, Burma and Mizoram in Northeast India, with a small number of speakers in south-eastern Bangladesh. Nowadays, more than eighty thousands Hakha Chin speakers are living in the Western countries, such as Canada, Denmark, Germany, Norway, and the United States, as well as Australia and New Zealand.

== Mutual intelligibility ==
Hakha Chin serves as a lingua franca in most parts of Chin State and is a native language in Hakha, Thantlang, and parts of Matupi. Derived from the same Lai dialect and sharing 85% of their phonology, Falam Chin speakers can easily communicate with Hakha speakers. As the capital of Chin State, Hakha provides government employment and business opportunities to people living elsewhere in Chin State. These people live here temporarily or permanently, and their families eventually learn how to speak Lai holh (Hakha).

The Chin people use Latin script (Hakha alphabet) as their writing system.

== Phonology ==
=== Syllable structure ===
Words in the Hakha Chin language are predominantly monosyllabic with some sesqui syllables featuring a "reduced syllable". Full syllables are either open or closed with a rising, falling, or low tone.

=== Consonants ===
The Hakha Chin language differentiates between voiced, voiceless, and voiceless aspirated obstruents. Additionally, two sets of sonorants are realised.

| | | Labial | Alveolar | | Retroflex | Palatal | Velar | Glottal |
| | | Labial | central | lateral | Retroflex | Palatal | Velar | Glottal |
|---|---|---|---|---|---|---|---|---|
| Nasal | voiced | m | n | | | | ŋ | |
| Nasal | voiceless | m̥ | n̥ | | | | ŋ̊ | |
| Plosive | tenuis | p | t | | ʈ | | k | ʔ |
| Plosive | aspirated | pʰ | tʰ | | ʈʰ | | kʰ | |
| Plosive | voiced | b | d | | | | (ɡ) | |
| Affricate | tenuis | | t͡s | tɬ | | | | |
| Affricate | aspirated | | t͡sʰ | tɬʰ | | | | |
| Fricative | voiceless | f | s | | | | | h |
| Fricative | voiced | v | z | | | | | |
| Liquid | voiced | | r | l | | | | |
| Liquid | voiceless | | r̥ | l̥ | | | | |
| Semivowel | | w | | | | j | | |

Consonants allowed in syllable codas are /p, t, k, m, n, ŋ, l, r, j, w/.

Consonants /m, n, ŋ, l, r/ occurring in syllable-final position may also occur as glottalized [mˀ, nˀ, ŋˀ, lˀ, rˀ].

The unattested parent language, Proto-Chin, featured a voiced velar plosive ɡ. The phoneme itself was lost in all of its daughter languages, due to a spirantisation to ɣ, which a labialisation followed afterwards. Only certain loanwords, not native words, have the voiced velar plosive.

In the Hakha alphabet, ⟨h⟩ transcribes the glottal fricative in initial position, but a glottal stop in coda position. Voiceless approximants are distinguished in writing from their voiced counterparts with a prefixed ⟨h⟩.

=== Vowels ===
The Hakha language features five vowels which may be long or short. Allophones occur for closed syllables.

| | Front | Central | Back |
|---|---|---|---|
| Close | i | | u |
| Mid | e | | ɔ |
| Open | | a | |

In final position, /e/ can be heard as [ɛ].

The Hakha language also features diphthongs.

| | Front | Central | Back |
|---|---|---|---|
| Close | ia iu | | ui ua |
| Mid | ei eu | | ɔi |
| Open | | ai au | |

== Grammar ==
Hakha-Chin is a subject-object-verb (SOV) language, and negation follows the verb.

=== Nominal morpholog ===
==== Pronouns ====
| | Unmarked | | Contrastive | |
| | singular | plural | singular | plural |
|---|---|---|---|---|
| 1st person | kâymaʔ | kânmaʔ | kǎy | kânniʔ |
| 2nd person | nâŋmaʔ | nânmaʔ | nǎŋ | nâŋniʔ |
| 3rd person | amaʔ | ânmaʔ | aniʔ | ânniʔ |

==== Cases ====
While person indexation seems to exhibit a nominative-accusative pattern, differential argument marking in NPs follows the ergative-absolutive alignment. It however is not always a canonical argument marking system and tends to be governed by discourse-pragmatic factors with various idiosyncrasies. In a polyvalent and ditransitive predicate, the recipient is marked instead of the patient.

ka-nu=niʔ rôol a-ka-chuanʔ
1SG.POSS-mother=ERG meal 3SG.SUBJ-1SG.OBJ-cook
'My mom cooked me a meal.'

- Absolutive -Ø
- Ergative =niʔ
- Genitive -ii
- Locative -aʔ

=== Verbal morphology ===
Adjectives as an independent lexical class does not exist in Kuku-Chin languages.

na-în a-ʈhǎa
2SG.POSS-house 3SG-good
'Your house is good.'

==== Person indexation ====
| | Subject | | Object | | Reflexive | |
| | singular | plural | singular | plural | singular | plural |
|---|---|---|---|---|---|---|
| 1st person | ka- | kan- | ka- | kan- | kaa-/kaii- | kan-ii- |
| 2nd person | na- | nan- | in-/n- | in- | naa-/naii- | nanii- |
| 3rd person | a- | an- | Ø- | Ø- | aa-/aii- | anii- |

The reflexive markers can be used to mark with middle-only verbs that denote generally intransitive, self-directed, avolitional, reciprocal, and non-punctual functions.

kàa-phuhrûŋ
1SG.MID-paranoid
'I feel paranoid.'

== Literacy and literature ==
Literacy rates are lower for older generations and higher in younger generations. The Hakha-Chin language uses the Latin script, unlike most languages of India and Bangladesh which use Devanagari or other Southeast Asian alphabets. Between 1978 and 1999, the Bible was translated into the language.

A written script for Hakha (Lai) was created in 1891 by DJC Mcnabb. Additional scripts were created in 1894 by AGZ Newland, in 1900 by Rev. Arthur E. Carson and Rev. Dr. Harry H. Tilbe, and in 1908 by Rev. Dr. Herbert Cope.

== Distribution ==
The Hakha-Chin language is also known as Haka, Baung-shè, and Lai in Burma, India, and Bangladesh. The Hakha-Chin people are largely members of the Lai tribe. In India, they are a Scheduled Tribe, which means the government recognizes them as a distinct people. As they mostly live in hilly or even mountainous remote areas, most Hakha-Chin speakers rely on swidden agriculture. Hakha-Chin speakers are predominantly Christian.

=== Burma ===
As of 1991, there were 100,000 Hakha-Chin speakers in Burma. Dialects vary from village to village.

=== Bangladesh ===
As of 2000, there were 1,264 Hakha-Chin speakers in Bangladesh. In Bangladesh, the Senthang dialect Shonshe is spoken and it may be a language in its own right.

=== India ===
As of 1996, there were 345,000 Hakha-Chin speakers in India, mostly in the Lawngtlai, Lunglei, and Aizawl districts of Mizoram as well as the southernmost tip of Assam. In India, the language is also known as Lai Pawi and Lai Hawlh and is taught in some primary schools. Most of its younger speakers in India are literate.

== Bibliography ==
- Peterson, David A. (2003). "Hakha Lai" In Graham Thurgood and Randy J. LaPolla, eds. The Sino-Tibetan Languages, 409–426. London: Routledge

== See also ==
- Lai languages
- Lai people
