= Mizo language =

Tibeto-Burman language spoken primarily in northeastern India

Mizo
- Mizo ṭawng or Duhlian ṭawng
- Pronunciation: [mi.zɔ t͡ɾɔŋ]
- Native to: India (Mizoram, Manipur, Tripura); Myanmar (Chin State and Sagaing Region); Bangladesh (Chittagong Hill Tracts)
- Ethnicity: Mizo
- Native speakers: 1,000,000+ (Note: 830,846 in India, 189,000 in Myanmar, 70,000 in Bangladesh; in total, 1,089,846, not including the diaspora.) (2011–2022)
- Language family: Sino-Tibetan: Tibeto-Burman; Central Tibeto-Burman (?); Kuki-Chin-Naga; Kuki-Chin; Central; Mizo
- Early forms: Proto-Kuki Chin: Central Kuki-Chin; Mizo language
- Writing system: Latin (Mizo alphabet); Bengali-Assamese script

Official status
- Official language in: Mizoram (India)
- Recognised minority language in: Manipur; Tripura
- Regulated by: Mizo Language Development Board

Language codes
- ISO 639-2: lus
- ISO 639-3: lus
- Glottolog: lush1249
- Linguasphere: 73-DCA-a
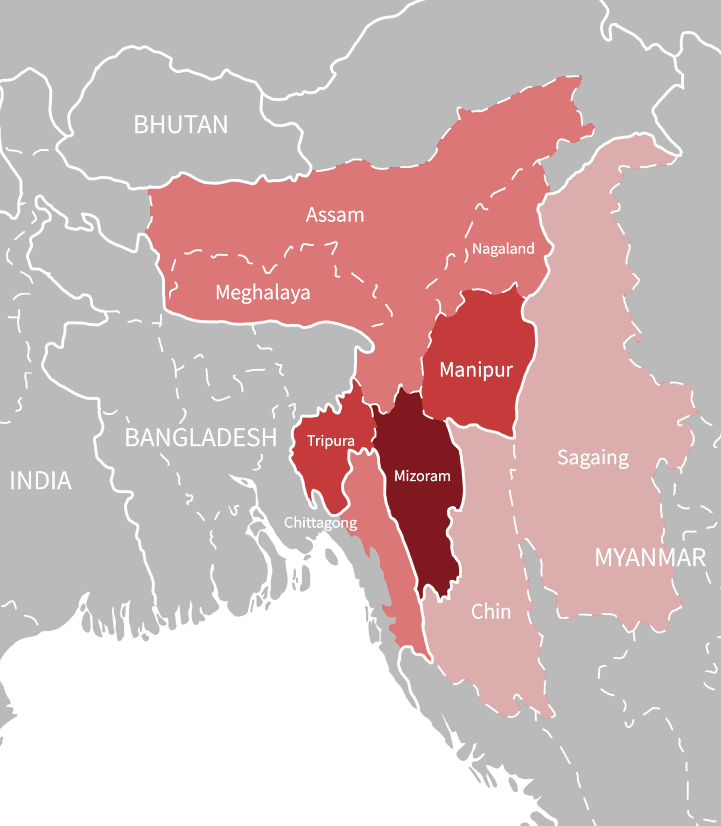
- Regions where Mizo is educational, and official Regions where Mizo is educational, but not official Regions where Mizo is not official and not educational Regions with significant Mizo speakers, and where Mizo is a working language

- Mizo is classified as Vulnerable by the UNESCO Atlas of the World's Languages in Danger

Mizo, also known as Duhlián ṭawng, is a Tibeto-Burman language spoken mainly in the Indian state of Mizoram, where it is the official language and lingua franca. It is the mother tongue of the Mizo people and some members of the Mizo diaspora. Other than Mizoram, it is also spoken in Meghalaya, Manipur, Tripura, and Assam states of India, Sagaing Region and Chin State in Myanmar, and Chittagong Hill Tracts of Bangladesh. It is mainly based on the Lusei dialect but it has also derived many words from its surrounding Mizo clans such as Hmar, Pawi, etc.

The language is also known as Duhlian, a colonial term, as the Duhlian people were the first among the Mizo people to be encountered by the British in the course of their colonial expansion, and Lushai.

== Classification ==
Mizo is a member of the Sino-Tibetan language family. Most linguist scholars classify Mizo as a part of the Central Kuki-Chin languages. In Mizo, the Kuki-Chin languages are recognised as Zohnahthlâk ṭawngho/Mizo ṭawngho. Within the central Kuki-Chin group, VanBik places it in the North Central group with other neighbouring languages such as Laiholh and Maraic. Other scholars, such as Schafer, classified it in the Kukish section of Burmese. Paul K. Benedict classified it under Central-Kuki under the Kuki-Chin-Naga branch.

Narration of indigenous recipe: 'Tawkte bai soup' in Mizo language

== Phonology ==
=== Vowels ===
==== Monophthongs ====
Mizo has eight tones and intonations for each of the vowels a, aw, e, i and u, four of which are reduced tones and the other four long tones. The vowel o has only three tones, all of them of the reduced type. The vowels can be represented as follows:

	Front	Central	Back
Close	i [i], [ɨ], [iː]		u [u], [ʊ], [ʊː]
Mid	e [e], [ɛ], [ɛː]		aw [o], [ɔ], [ɔː]
Open	a [ʌ], [a], [ɑ], [ɑː], [ä]		

==== Diphthongs ====
Starting with a	Starting with e	Starting with i	Starting with u
ai (/aɪ̯/, /ɑːi/ or /ai/)	ei (/eɪ̯/, /ɛi/ or /ɛɪ̯/)	ia (/ɪə̯/ /ɪa/, /ja/ or /ɪa̭/)	ua (/u̯a/ or /ua̭/)
au (/aʊ̯/, /ɑːʊ̯/)	eu (/ɛu/, /eʊ/ or /eʊ̯/)	iu (/ɪʊ̯/ or /iw/)	ui (/ɥi/ or /ʔwi/)

==== Triphthongs ====
Mizo has the following triphthongs:

- iai, as in iai, piai
- iau as in riau ruau, tiau tuau etc.
- uai, as in uai, zuai, tuai, vuai
- uau, as in riau ruau, tiau tuau, suau suau

=== Consonants ===
Mizo has the following consonants, with the first symbol being its orthographical form and the second one its representation in the IPA:

		Labial	Dental	Alveolar		Velar	Glottal
		Labial	Dental	median	lateral	Velar	Glottal
Plosive/ Affricate	voiceless	p [p]	t [t]	ch [t͡s]	tl [t͡l]	k [k]	h [ʔ]^{1}
Plosive/ Affricate	aspirated	ph [pʰ]	th [tʰ]	chh [t͡sʰ], [tʃʰ]	thl [t͡lʰ]	kh [kʰ]	
Plosive/ Affricate	voiced	b [b]	d [d]				
Plosive/ Affricate	flap			ṭ [t͡ɾ]			
Plosive/ Affricate	aspirated flap			ṭh [t͡ɾʰ]			
Fricative	voiceless	f [f]	s [s]				h [h]
Fricative	voiced	v [v]	z [z]				
Sonorant	plain	m [m]	n [n]	r [r]	l [l]	ng [ŋ]	
Sonorant	aspirated	hm [ʰm]	hn [ʰn]	hr [ʰr]	hl [ʰl]	ngh [ʰŋ]	
Sonorant	glottalised^{1}			rh [rʔ]	lh [lʔ]		

1. The glottal and glottalised consonants appear only in final position.

=== Tone ===
Mizo is a tonal language, as it has differences in pitch and pitch contour that can change the meanings of words.

The eight tones and intonations that the vowel a (and the vowels aw, e, i, u, which constitutes all the tones in Mizo) can have are shown by the letter sequence p-a-n-g, as follows:

- long high tone: páng as in páng là (which has the same intonation as sáng in the sentence Thingküng sáng tak kan huanah a ding).
- long low tone: pàng as in Tui a kawt pàng pâng mai (which has the same intonation as vàng in the word vànglaini).
- peaking tone: pâng as in Tui a kawt pàng pâng mai (which has the same intonation as thlûk in I hla phuah thlûk chu a va mawi ve).
- dipping tone: päng as in Tuibur a hmuam päng mai (which has the same intonation as säm in Kan huan ka säm vêl mai mai).
- short rising tone: pǎng as in naupǎng (which has the same intonation as thǎng in Kan huanah thǎng ka kam).
- short falling tone: pȧng as in I va inkhuih pȧng ve? (which has the same intonation as pȧn in I lam ka rawn pȧn )
- short mid tone: pang as in A dik lo nghâl pang (which has the same tone as man in Sazu ka man )
- short low tone: pạng as in I pạng a sá a nih kha (which has the same tone as chạl in I chạlah thosí a fù ).

Notation of vowels with intonation
Short tones				Long tones			
mid	rising	falling	low	peaking	high	dipping	low
a	(ǎ / ă) / ả	(ȧ / ã) / ą	ạ	â	á	ä	à
o	(ǒ / ŏ) / ỏ / (ó)		ọ / (ò)				
aw	(ǎw / ăw) / ảw	(ȧw / ãw) / ąw	ạw	âw	áw	äw	àw
u	(ǔ / ŭ) / ủ	(ů / ũ) / ų	ụ	û	ú	ü	ù
e	(ě / ĕ) / ẻ	(ė / ẽ) / ę	ẹ	ê	é	ë	è
i	(ǐ / ĭ) / ỉ	(ĩ) / į	ị	î	í	ï	ì

Note that the exact orthography of tones with diacritics is still not standardised (notably for differentiating the four short tones with confusive or conflicting choices of diacritics) except for the differentiation of long tones by using the circumflex from short tones. As well, the need of at least seven diacritics may cause complications to design easy keyboard layouts, even if they use dead keys and even if not all basic Latin letters are needed for Mizo itself, and so publications may represent the short tones using digrams (e.g. by appending some apostrophe or glottal letter) to reduce the number of diacritics needed to only four (those used now for the long tones) on only two dead keys.

== Grammar ==
=== Verbs ===
==== Conjugation ====
In Mizo verb tense is indicated by the aspect and the addition of particles, such as:

- ang (simple future),
- tawh (simple past and past perfect),
- mék (progressive tenses, present and past),
- dáwn (simple future),
- dáwn mék (near future),

==== Modification of verbs ====
Mizo gerunds and past participles are formed by a change in word ending called tihdanglamna; the resulting modified forms are called stem II in English-speaking linguistics literature.

Examples of tihdanglamna
verb	modified (stem II) form
ziak, 'to write'	ziah, 'writing, written'
tât, 'to whet'	tah, 'whetting, whetted'
mà, 'to divorce'	mâk, 'divorcing, divorced'

=== Nouns ===
Mizo nouns undergo declension into cases.

Mizo noun declension
nominative/accusative	genitive	ergative	instrumental
nụlá, 'the girl'	nụla, 'the girl's'	nụláịn, 'by the girl'	nụláin, 'by means of the girl'
tǔi	tǔi	tuiịn	tuiin
Thangạ (a proper noun)	Thanga	Thangȧ'n	Thangạ-in/Thangạ hmangin

Nouns are pluralised by suffixing -te, -ho, -teho or -hote.

Pluralisation examples
singular	plural
mipa, 'man'	mipate, mipaho, 'men'
naupang, 'child'	naupangte, naupangho, 'children'

=== Pronouns ===
All Mizo pronouns occur in two forms, namely in free form and clitic form and are declined into cases.

Mizo pronouns
	nominative	genitive	accusative	ergative
clitic forms	ka, 'I'	ka, 'my, mine'	mi, min, 'me'	keima'n, 'by me'
clitic forms	kan, 'we'	kan, 'our, ours'	min, 'us'	keimahnin, 'by us'
clitic forms	i, 'you (singular)'	i, 'your, yours'	che, 'you'	nangma'n, 'by you'
clitic forms	in, 'you (plural)'	in, 'your, yours'	che u, 'you'	nangmahnin, 'by you'
clitic forms	a, 'he, she, it'	a, 'his, hers, its'	amah, 'him, her, it'	ama'n, 'by him, by her, by it'
clitic forms	an, 'they'	an, 'their, theirs'	anmahni, 'them'	anmahni'n, 'by them'
free forms	kei, 'I'	keima, 'my, mine'	keimah, 'me'	keima'n, 'by me'
free forms	keimah, 'we'	keima, 'our, ours'	keimah, keimah min, 'us'	keima'n, 'by us'
free forms	keini, 'you (singular)'	keini, 'your, yours'	keini min, 'you'	keini'n, 'by you'
free forms	keimahni, 'you (plural)'	keimahni, 'your, yours'	keimahni min, 'you'	keimahni'n, 'by you'
free forms	anni, 'he, she, it'	anni, 'his, hers, its'	anni, 'him, her, it'	anni'n, 'by him, by her, by it'
free forms	anmahni, 'they'	anmahni, 'their, theirs'	anmahni, 'them'	anmahni'n, 'by them'

=== Negation ===
For declarative sentences, negation is achieved by adding the particle lo (not) at the end of a sentence:

Sentence	Negation
Lala a lo kal Lala is coming/Lala came	Lala a lo kal lo Lala did not come
Pathumin paruk a sem thei Three divides six	Pathumin paruk a sem thei lo Three does not divide six

=== Cardinal numbers ===
- (pa)khat, 'one'
- (pa)hnih, 'two'
- (pa)thum, 'three'
- (pa)li, 'four'
- (pa)ngá, 'five'
- (pa)ruk, 'six'
- (pa)sarih, 'seven'
- (pa)riat, 'eight'
- (pa)kua, 'nine'
- sàwm, 'ten'
- sàwmpakhat, 'eleven'
- sàwmpakua, 'nineteen'
- sawmhnih, 'twenty'
- sawmthum, 'thirty'
- sawmküa, 'ninety'
- zà, 'one hundred'
- zangá, 'five hundred'
- säng(khat), 'one thousand'
- sïng(khat), 'ten thousand'
- nûaih(khat), 'one hundred thousand'
- maktadûaih, 'one million'
- vaibelchhia, 'ten million'
- vaibelchhetak, 'one hundred million'
- tlûklehdingäwn, 'one billion'

== Writing system ==
The Mizo alphabet is based on the Roman alphabet and has 25 letters. A written script for Lushai was created in 1874 by Thomas Herbert Lwein.

Letter	a	aw	b	ch	d	e	f	g	ng	h	i	j	k
Name													

Letter	l	m	n	o	p	r	s	t	ṭ	u	v	z
Name												

In its current form, it was devised by the first Christian missionaries of Mizoram, J. H. Lorrain and F. W. Savidge, based on the Hunterian system of transliteration.

A circumflex ^ was later added to the vowels to indicate long vowels, viz., Â, Ê, Î, Ô, Û, which were insufficient to fully express Mizo tone. Recently, a leading newspaper in Mizoram, Vanglaini, the magazine Kristian Ṭhalai, and other publishers began using Á, À, Ä, É, È, Ë, Í, Ì, Ï, Ó, Ò, Ö, Ú, Ù, Ü to indicate the long intonations and tones. However, this does not differentiate the different intonations that short tones can have.

== Sample texts ==
The following is a sample text in Mizo of Article 1 of the Universal Declaration of Human Rights:

Mizo: Mi zawng zawng hi zalèna piang kan ni a, zahawmna leh dikna chanvoah intluk tláng vek kan ni. Chhia leh ṭha hriatna fím neia siam kan nih avangin kan mihring puite chungah inunauna thinlung kan pu tlat tur a ni.

English: All human beings are born free and equal in dignity and rights. They are endowed with reason and conscience. Therefore, they should act towards one another in a spirit of brotherhood.

== Literature ==
Mizo has a thriving literature, which has both written and oral traditions. It has undergone a considerable change in the 20th century.

The Mizoram Press Information Bureau lists some twenty Mizo daily newspapers just in Aizawl city, as of March 2013.

== See also ==
- Mizo name
- Mizo honorifics

== Sources ==
- Benedict, Paul K. (1972). Sino-Tibetan: A Conspectus (PDF). Cambridge University Press. ISBN 978-0-521-08175-7.
- Chhangte, Lalnunthangi (1986). A preliminary grammar of the Mizo language (PDF). Michigan: University Micofilms International.
- VanBik, Kenneth (2009). Proto-Kuki-Chin: A Reconstructed Ancestor of the Kuki-Chin Languages (PDF). California: University of California. p. 1. ISBN 978-0-944613-47-4.
- K. S. Singh: 1995, People of India-Mizoram, Volume XXXIII, Anthropological Survey of India, Calcutta.
- Grierson, G. A. (Ed.) (1904b). Tibeto-Burman Family: Specimens of the Kuki-Chin and Burma Groups, Volume III Part III of Linguistic Survey of India. Office of the Superintendent of Government Printing, Calcutta.
- Grierson, G. A: 1995, Languages of North-Eastern India, Gian Publishing House, New Delhi.
- Lunghnema, V., Mizo chanchin (B.C. 300 aṭanga 1929 A.D.), 1993.
- Zoramdinthara, Dr., Mizo Fiction: Emergence and Development. Ruby Press & Co.(New Delhi). 2013. ISBN 978-93-82395-16-4
