= David Van Bik =

Chin biblical scholar (1926–2000)

The Reverend David Van Bik
- Lai Bible Translator
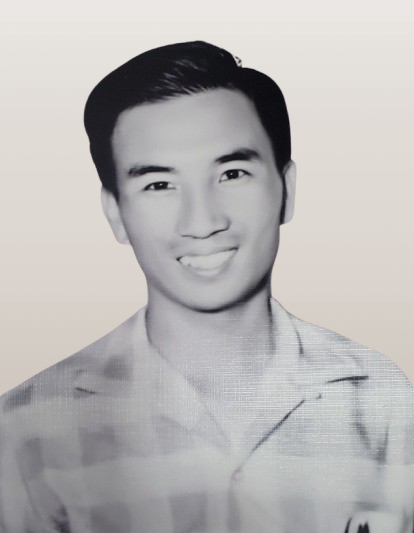

Orders
- Ordination: by Zomi Baptist Convention (now Chin Baptist Convention) at its triennial meetings in June 1957

Personal details
- Born: 28 July 1926 Tlangpi
- Died: 19 August 2000 (aged 74)
- Buried: Cemetery in Hakha
- Denomination: Baptist Christian
- Residence: Hakha Pidawta, Chin State, Myanmar
- Education: Diploma in Theology (India); Bachelor of Theology (USA); Master of Arts (USA)
- Alma mater: Berkeley School of Theology, California, formerly American Baptist Seminary of the West, U.S.

David Van Bik (28 July 1926 – 19 August 2000) was the Lai Bible translator, a Chin biblical scholar, the author of Chin-English and English-Chin dictionaries, an ordained Baptist minister, and a recipient of the honorary Doctor of Divinity from his alma mater Berkeley School of Theology (in the U.S. city of Berkeley, California).

David Van Bik was among the most prestigious Chin Christian leaders of the 20th century for his 'outstanding contribution' to the Christian ministry in the Chin Hills, Myanmar. Rev Robert G Johnson, D.D. who was the last American Baptist Missionary to the Chin Hills called him 'a man of faith and works'. Historically, David Van Bik was the first degree holder of Bachelor of Theology (B.Th) among Chins in Myanmar. In 1955, he achieved the B.Th degree from the Central Baptist Theological Seminary (in the U.S. in Shawnee, Kansas). He was also the first Secretary of the Hakha Council of Churches in Hakha, the Capital City of Chin State (formerly the Chin Hills).

== Early life and education ==
David Van Bik was born on 28 July 1926 in Tlangpi village, in the Chin Hills (now Chin State, Myanmar). David was the eldest son among five children born to Pi Renh Ṭial and Saya Chawn Tur. His father Chawn Tur was an evangelist and a Christian preacher, working under the leadership of Rev Van Lo, who was the only ordained minister in the earlier era of the Christian Chins.

Before his father died on 3 May 1936, David attended Year 2 at Tlangpi Primary School in his birthplace. He studied Year 1-Year 4 in Tlangpi Village. After his father died, David attended Middle School in Falam of the Chin Hills and completed Year 6 in Falam.

In 1939, when David was 13 years old, World War II began. As a result, all of the schools in the Chin Hills and Burma were closed by 1942, when Bik was 16 years old. In 1943–1945, he worked as a clerk for the Allied Civil Supplies under the British Government at the warehouse in Bungkhua and Thangzang villages of the Chin Hills. During the war years, David Van Bik also spent times in the Lushai Hills (now Mizoram, India) where he learned the Lushai language which became 'very useful' for his later Bible translation work.

In 1945, at the Chin Baptist Association's meeting in Tlangpi village, David Van Bik was chosen to attend a Theological College in India. In 1946, he began studying a Diploma in Theology at the Cherrapunjee Theological College, Assam State (now Meghalaya State) of India and completed this course in 1948. In 1949, he passed the Matric Examination at Serampore College, India. In 1951, he began studying Bachelor of Theology at the Burma Baptist Divinity School (now Myanmar Institute of Theology) in Insein, Rangoon. The Burma Baptist Divinity School was affiliated to the Central Baptist Theological Seminary, which had conferred the B.Th degree upon him in 1955. David Van Bik was the first graduate in Bachelor of Theology among the Chins in Myanmar.

In 1957, he began studying the Master of Arts at Berkeley School of Theology, which granted him a two-year scholarship. David took this M.A course in preparation for becoming the Principal of Zomi Theological School (now Chin Christian Institute of Theology) in Falam, Myanmar. In 1959, he achieved the Master's degree and returned to the Chin Hills in Myanmar.

In 1983, Van Bik studied a six-month media course at Oxford Polytechnic in England, in the purpose of advancing his publishing work in the Hakha Chin Literature. This Oxford Polytechnic was renamed as 'Oxford Brookes University' in 1992. The World Association of Christian Communication granted him a scholarship for this Print Media course.

== Marriage and children ==
On 23 April 1956, David Van Bik married Mabel Zo Kai in Tlangpi village. They had five children: *Steven

- Erik (a Myanmar police officer)
- Rollin (2022–2026 President of Chin Baptist Churches USA)
- Kenneth (Assistant professor, Department of English, Comparative Literature and Linguistics, California State University, Fullerton
- Alice Jane.

== Ministry and Bible translation ==
=== Christian Ministry ===
In 1950, after David Van Bik attained the Diploma in Theology in India, he worked as a lecturer at the Chin Hill Bible School under the American Baptist missionaries, Rev Robert G and Betty Johnsons in Hakha. He taught theology and other subjects including the Epistles of Paul until late 1950 when the school graduation took place.

In 1955 to 1957 after he received the Bachelor of Theology in the U.S., he taught the same subjects at the same Bible School in Hakha. In May 1959– 1963, he served as the Principal of the newly renamed Zomi Baptist Theological School in Falam. David was necessary to leave his Principalship for these reasons. Because of General Ne Win's coup in Myanmar on 2 March 1962, it was clear that Ne Win government would expel Rev Johnson from Myanmar while the expulsion was 'only a matter of time'. Therefore, David needed to do the Lai Bible translation work together with Johnson on a full-time basis before Johnson left Myanmar. He left the Zomi Baptist Theological School in Falam in 1963. During his principalship years of Zomi Baptist Theological School in Falam, he also served as a part-time Pastor at Falam Baptist Church. In 1963, he succeeded Rev Johnson as the Treasurer of the Hakha Baptist Association.

After David Van Bik finished the Lai Bible translation work in 1976, he established the Christian Communication Centre in Hakha. Until 1985, he worked as the director and the publisher at this centre. In 1990–1996, he worked as the Principal of the newly established Chin Bible School in Hakha which was opened in 1990 and renamed as the 'Chin Christian University' in 2015. He was retired in May, 1996 but his activities remained mainly the same.

=== Lai Bible translation ===
According to Rev Johnson, there were four main elements of the qualification for a Bible translator: being the native speaker of the translation language, acquiring a good knowledge of English, obtaining a good Theological Education, and being a devout Christian filled with the love of Christ. In his views, the Chins were 'extraordinarily blessed' in David Van Bik concerning the Lai Bible translation. David was able to speak the Hakha Chin (his native language), Mizo (Lushai language), and Burmese, while he knew some Hebrew and Greek for the Bible translation work.

==== Three committees on Lai Bible translation ====
First committee consisted of David Van Bik (the Chief translator) and Robert G Johnson. David dictated the Lai translation and Johnson wrote it down by hand, verse after verse throughout the books.

Second committee comprised the first committee members, and three or four more members to check and correct the translation for the language clarity and understandability.

Third committee was composed of all the first and second committee members and eight to ten more members including women and those who were unable to read. Their task was to check the language flow and the translation beauty and smoothness to ensure that even illiterate people could understand it.

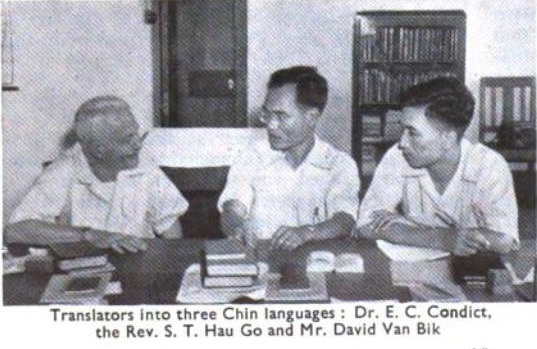
Translators into three Chin languages : Dr. E. C. Condict, the Rev. S. T. Hau Go and Mr. David Van Bik. Source: British and Foreign Bible Society

In the 1953 record of the British and Foreign Bible Society, a picture portrayed David Van Bik as one of the Bible translators in Chin languages. However, according to Rev Johnson, David Van Bik and he began the work of Lai Bible translation in Hakha from 1955. They performed the translation work in their spare times. In 1957, they completed the translation of the Book of Genesis and Book of Exodus, which were published in the same year. From 1961, David in Falam and Johnson in Hakha resumed the translation work. They had a six-week work rotation for 24 months: David coming to Hakha for two weeks and Johnson going to Falam for two weeks. Then, for the fifth and sixth weeks, they worked individually.

From 1963 after David left the Zomi Baptist Theological School in Falam, he and Johnson worked for the Bible translation on a full-time basis. Until April 1966, they translated the Old Testament from Leviticus to the book of First Samuel. At the end of April, 1966, Ne Win government's 'axe fell on' Rev Johnson and he was forced to leave Myanmar. When he left the country, more than half of the Old Testament translation work was already done.

Notably, according to Rev Johnson, David Van Bik and he often faced the problems of naming things which did not exist in the Hakha Chin language. However, David solved the naming problems of 'minerals, gems, animals, birds, insects,' and clothing articles. There existed another problem that no Chin people in Hakha were suitable for becoming their full-time typist. The typing work fell on Betty Johnson who became their typist until she left Burma.

After Johnson left Burma, David Van Bik continued the translation work for the remaining books of the Old Testament and all the books of the New Testament. He 'almost alone' did the Bible translation work and completed the work in 1975. However, the typing, checking and correcting works took about 12 months and the whole work was done in 1976.

== Lai Bible publication, distribution and contraband ==
Printing the Bible was impossible inside Burma because of Ne Win government's 'Burmese Way to Socialism' based on the principles of 'Marxism', 'Buddhism', and 'staunch nationalism' from 1964. Printing the Bible outside Burma also became contraband. Despite this massive barrier, with the assistance of the United Bible Society, it was decided for the Lai Bible to be printed in India. As another barrier, Burma government would not certainly grant David Van Bik a passport to travel in India because of its policy. Between 1962 and 1979, no passport was granted to any Chin Christian applicants in Burma.

David Van Bik took a series of risks to bring the Lai Bible 'manuscript' to the Bible Society of India in Bangalore, India. According to him, he took the first risk of bringing the manuscript out of Hakha City where the Burma Police officers on patrol could arrest him with the manuscript. Because of the rain as 'a blessing in disguise' in Hakha in March 1978, he managed to go out of the City without encountering the police. He spent the Easter Sunday at Tlangpi village on his journey to Bangalore, India for printing the Bible. He took the second risk of crossing the flooding Ṭio River at Myanmar-India border. Four swimmers and an elder from Tlangpi village accompanied with him and helped him cross Ṭio River. He took the third risk of using a pseudonym to travel between Mizoram State and Bangalore within India. He adopted a Mizo name 'Lalhngingliana' for his travel within India to avoid the possible arrest of him as an alien within India.

The Bible Society of India printed the first edition of 10,000 copies of the Lai Bible in Bangalore in 1978. The Bible Society of India transported all the Bible copies to Farkawn village, Mizoram State. Tlangpi villagers carried all the Bible copies on their backs from Farkawn to Tlangpi as no other means of transportation was ever available. All the Bible copies were hidden in Tlangpi village considering the Burma army on patrol might come to confiscate them. On 29 May 1979, the first consignment of the Bible copies arrived in Hakha. The Bible distribution among Chin Christians needed to be done as quickly as possible because the Burma army could confiscate all the Bible copies at anywhere in Burma. The distribution of all the 10,000 copies of the Lai Bible was finished from June to October during the rainy season in 1979.

== Lai Bible revision ==
In June 1996, the revision work of the Lai Bible was begun with David Van Bik as the principal reviser. A consultation and reviewing committee consisted of the professors of Myanmar Institute of Theology. The aim was to make the revised Bible readily available for printing in March 1998 and to distribute the revised copies during the period of the Chin Evangel Centenary Celebration in 1999. This event was held on 26–28 March 1999 in Hakha to commemorate the 100th anniversary of the arrival of Rev Arthur and Laura Carsons, the first American missionaries to the Chin Hills.

== Personal views ==
According to Rev Paul Clasper whose first theological student in Myanmar was David Van Bik and who became his long-time friend, David was always single-minded and completely committed to his work and study. However, he was 'not dogmatic' about his own ideas, meaning that he was assertive about ideas.

David Van Bik believed that Christianity alone was Chin 'national salvation' in the danger of Myanmar military government policy of 'Burmanisation' (one country, one nation, one government, one language, one religion, and one ethnic dialect) that led 'Lai Chin' to becoming an endangered language. In August 1999 when he was a Visiting scholar at the University of California, Berkeley for the project of Chin-English Dictionary under his authorship, he wrote that he wondered whether the Lai Chin language would be able to survive this Burmanisation policy for the following one hundred years.

== Published works ==
=== English-Chin and Chin-English dictionaries ===
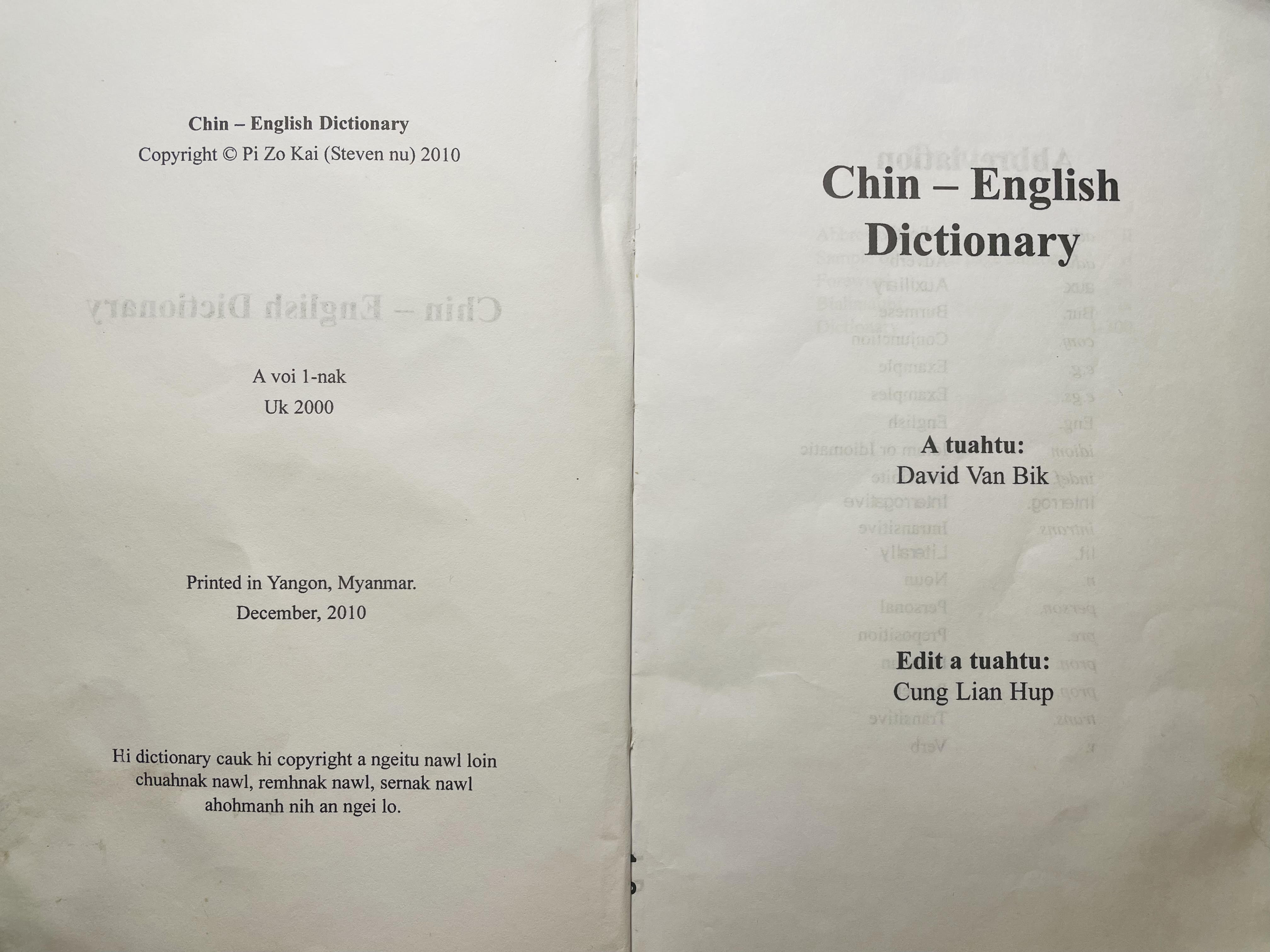
Chin-English dictionary (first edition, 2010) by David Van Bik and edited by Cung Lian Hup

David Van Bik authored English-Chin dictionary and Chin-English dictionary in the Hakha Chin language. In 1987, he published the first edition of his 584-paged Chin-English Dictionary. On the foreword page of the Chin-English Dictionary, Editor Cung Lian Hup wrote: David Van Bik had finished the first draft of Chin-English Dictionary on 21 March 1998. The first edition was published in Myanmar in December 2010. The third edition with 512 pages was published in 2016. The project of Chin-English dictionary was sponsored by Professor James A Matisoff of the University of California, Berkeley and assisted by the Open Society Institute and the Endangered Language Fund of Yale University.

=== Other translation works ===
To develop the Chin Christian Literature, David Van Bik published his many other translation books. He selected the books for translation as he thought most necessary for the development of the Chin Christian Literature. In addition to the Lai Bible, English-Chin dictionary and Chin-English dictionary, he published at least 26 more books in Hakha Chin language.

- About the Holy Spirit
- A New Being in Christ
- Beautitudes
- Commentary on Gospel According to Matthew
- Commentary on Gospel According to Luke
- Commentary on the Acts of Apostles
- Commentary on the Letter of Paul to the Ephesians
- Commentary on the Letter of the Hebrews
- Commentary on the First Letter of John
- Commentary on Daniel
- Commentary on Isaiah
- Forward through th Ages
- Good Stewards
- History of American Baptist Mission to the Chins (Vol I & II)
- How Came Our Bible
- Jesus' Quotations in the Old Testament
- Peace Corner
- Pentecostalism in the Chin Hills
- The Book of Psalms
- The Foundation of Christian Faith
- The Master's Men
- The Morning Stars: Missionaries to the Chin Hills
- The Second Coming of Christ
- The Work of the Holy Spirit
- Understanding the Old Testament
- What is the Salvation?

== Honours and awards ==
David Van Bik achieved two distinguished awards and the honorary Doctor of Divinity.

=== Berkeley School of Theology's Distinguished Alum of the Year Award (1985) ===
According to Berkeley School of Theology, this Alum Award was begun in 1981. Since 1981, the alums have been selected for their excellence in ministry and support of the School. David Van Bik was the fifth winner of this Distinguished Alum of the Year Award in 1985. He received the Alum Award in absentia as he was in Burma and unable to come to the U.S. to receive it.

=== Fellow of Distinguished Service Award (1990) ===
In 1990, Myanmar Institute of Theology and Myanmar Baptist Convention conferred Fellow of Distinguished Service Award upon David Van Bik along with three fellows: Paul Clasper, Lloyd James and Russell Brown. At the event to commemorate the 175th anniversary of the arrival of Adoniram Judson, the first Christian missionary in Burma, they were given the Award in recognition of their 'outstanding contributions' to the ministry of Myanmar Baptist Convention.

=== Berkeley School of Theology's Doctor of Divinity (1994) ===
On 21 May 1994, Berkeley School of Theology awarded him the honorary Doctor of Divinity in recognition of his exceptional contributions to 'the life and mission of Christian Church' in the Chin Hills. Paul Clasper wrote: 'David was recognized for a most fruitful life-time of demanding, specialized and difficult works at strategic time and place – in the Chin Hills.'

== Death ==
David Van Bik died on 19 August 2000, in Frederick, Maryland, after a tumor had been found in his nose earlier that year.

David Van Bik's body was returned to his native land, the Chin Hills, Myanmar. His funeral service was held in Hakha with 20,000 Chin people in attendance and in mourning. He was finally buried in the cemetery near Hakha Baptist Church in Hakha. His casket, made in the U.S., has been displayed at David Van Bik's Memorial museum in Hakha for more than 23 years.

== See also ==
- Chin Christian College
- Chin Christian Institute of Theology (formerly, the first name Zomi Baptist Convention Bible School was renamed as Zomi Baptist Theological School upon David Van Bik's proposal for the name change).

== Sources ==
- To God be the glory: In memory and honour of David Van Bik (PDF), Yangoon: Cung Lian Hup, 2001
  - Blazier, Ken. "David Van Bik". In To God be the glory (2001), pp. 15–25.
  - Clasper, Paul. "David Van Bik: My first theological student in Myanmar". In To God be the glory (2001), pp. 26–29.
  - Johnson, Robert G. "David Van Bik: A man of faith and works". In To God be the glory (2001), pp. 5–14.
  - Hup, Cung Lian. "A short biography of David Van Bik". In To God be the glory (2001), pp. 42–45.
  - Sangawi, James. "A tribute to Rev. David Van Bik (L. Th.; B. Th.; M.A.; D.D.)". In To God be the glory (2001), pp. 36–39.
- Johnson, Robert G (2006), On the Back Road to Mandalay, USA: Xulon Press, pp. 135–197, ISBN 978-1-60034-735-1.
