= Chin Christian Institute of Theology =

Theological school in Chin State, Myanmar

Coordinates: 22°55′08.9″N 93°40′57.3″E

Chin Christian Institute of Theology, also known as CCIT, is situated in Falam, Chin State, Myanmar. It is a school run by Chin Baptist Convention, which is affiliated to Myanmar Baptist Convention.

== History ==
American missionary Chester Strait started a bible school in Hakha in 1928 (98 years ago). During World War II, the school was closed. To meet the needs of the growing churches in the Chin Hills, bible schools were opened again in Hakha by the Johnsons, 1948, and in Tedim by the Nelsons, 1947. The said missionaries went home on furlough in 1952.

A bible school was started again in Tedim in 1953 (73 years ago). S T Hau Go was the principal there. Though it was not yet official, S T Hau Go gave the name Zomi Baptist Convention Bible School. The school needed to be moved to Hakha in 1954; R G Johnson was the principal there. The first graduation service was held there in 1956. Johnson printed the name Chin Hills Bible School on the first graduation certificate. The Zomi Baptist Convention Executive Committee officially gave the name Zomi Baptist Bible School in December 1956. The Schools both in Tedim and in Hakha were conducted on middle school level.

Baptist Mission Secretary, E E Sowards, was much concerned for the upgrading of the school into a high school level. The school was moved from Hakha to Falam, the District Headquarters, in 1959.

In 1960, Principal David Van Bik changed the name to Zomi Baptist Theological School. It was again renamed to Zomi Baptist Theological Seminary in 1974 and to Zomi Theological College in 1983. The year started the B Th degree program. The college was affiliated to the Burma now Myanmar Institute of Theology, Insein, from 1983 to 1991. Thus the B Th degree was conferred by the BIT for three times: 1988, 1990, 1991.

The college was accepted as a member institute of the Association for Theological Education in South East Asia, ATESEA, in 1982. The ZTC BTh was accredited by the ATESEA in 1991. In March 2013, the school was renamed Chin Christian Institute of Theology in March 2013.

Since opened, the CCIT has produced 851 Christian ministers and community leaders. The CCIT have had a Th.B. joint-program with four sister schools: Chin Christian College in Hakha, Tedim Theological College, Tedim, and Bethel Theological Seminary, Tahan, Union Theological Seminary, UTC, Matupi. Those ones were already accredited by the ATESEA in 2000, 2004.

== Programs ==
At present, CCIT offers the following programs of study:

- Master of Divinity (a three-year master program)
- Master of Ministry (a two-year master program)
- Bachelor of Theology (a four-year bachelor program)
- Bachelor of Ministry (a two-year bachelor program)
- Bachelor in Religious Education (a two-year bachelor program)
