= Immanuel Baptist Church =

Immanuel Baptist Church may refer to:

- Immanuel Baptist Church (Newton, Massachusetts), a building designed by Henry Hobson Richardson
- Immanuel Baptist Church (Rochester, New York), listed on the NRHP in New York, U.S.
- Immanuel Baptist Church (Salt Lake City, Utah), listed on the NRHP in Salt Lake City, Utah, U.S.
- Immanuel Baptist Church (Yangon, Burma)
