= Chin Baptist Convention =

Burmese Baptist Christian denomination

Chin Baptist Convention, Chin State, Myanmar
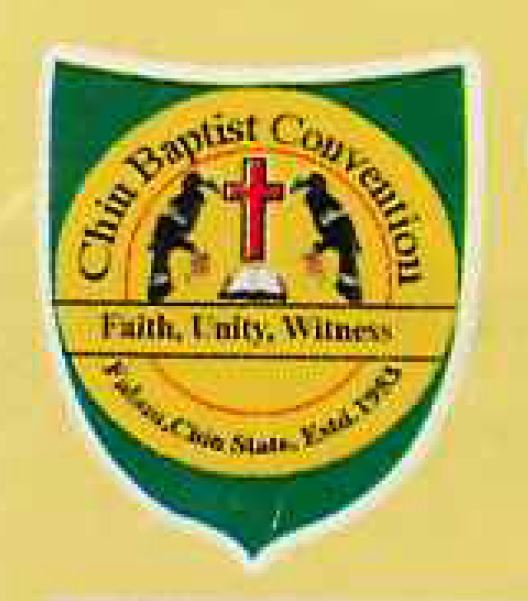
- Logo
- Classification: Evangelicalism
- Orientation: Baptist
- Associations: Myanmar Baptist Convention
- Headquarters: Falam, Chin State
- Origin: 1953
- Congregations: 915 churches (2020)
- Members: 200704 (2020)

Chin Baptist Convention (formerly Zomi Baptist Convention) is a Baptist Christian denomination in Myanmar. The headquarters is in Falam, Chin State, Myanmar. It is a member of the Myanmar Baptist Convention.

== History ==
Rev. Arthur E. Carson and Laura H. Carson from the American Baptist International Ministries with the support of Karen missionaries arrived in Hakha, Chin Hills on 15 March 1899. After five years, Mr. & Mrs. Pau Suan and Mr. & Mrs. Thuam Hang of Khuasak were converted to Christianity from animism in 1904. Christianity slowly spread through Chin Hills and the Chin Hills Baptist Association was formed in 1907. The Chin Hills Baptist Association comprised Baptists from Falam, Hakha and Tedim subdivisions. From the arrival of the Carsons in March 1899 to March 1948, the Chin Baptists were solely under the guidance of the missionaries stationed at Tedim and Hakha. In March 1948, the Association held a meeting at Satawm village and the Falam, Tedim and Hakha decided to run their own business. Thus, March 1948 was the beginning of the Falam Baptist Association, Tedim Baptist Association and Hakha Baptist Association. The three associations ran their own affairs until 1952.

=== The forming of Zomi Baptist Convention ===
In March 1952, the mission secretary, Rev. E. E. Soward, paid a survey trip to Chin Hills. Rev. S.T Hau Go was in charge of the Chin Baptists works while the Johnsons of the Hakha and the Nelson of Tedim were on holiday. Revd. E.E Sowards went to Tedim Baptist annual meeting at Laitui village on 14–17 February 1952. Then he went on tour to Falam and Hakha area with Rev. S.T Hau Go. After the survey, he proposed the following for Baptists in the Chin Hills:

1. The Chin Baptist to have one organization,
2. To have one Bible School combined with an Agricultural School,
3. To have one Mission Hospital.

For an organization, the Constitution drafting committee was led by the Rev. S.T Hau Go together with the most senior and revered Pastor Rev. Sang Ling from Hakha, and the second eldest and most respected pastor Rev. Sang Fen. The committee held a meeting at Falam Baptist Church in late October and early November 1952. The meeting decided to form one Baptist organization, and the organization was named Zomi Baptist Convention (ZBC), which comprised Falam Baptist Association, Tedim Baptist Association and Hakha Baptist Association. On March 5–7, 1953, the Zomi Baptist Convention was officially and universally adopted by the general meeting in Saikah, Thantlang township. The general meeting was attended by 3,000 Chin Christians. The constitution was also approved in 1954 at the general meeting held in Khuasak, Tedim township.

Rev. S.T. Hau Go was the first general secretary of ZBC. He received an MA from Madras University in 1946. He was also a 1950 alumnus of Eastern Theological Seminary in Philadelphia with a Master of Religious Education (M.R.E). He returned to Chin Hills and played a key role in forming Zomi Baptist Convention, Tedim Baptist Association and Kale Valleys Baptist Association. He later retired as a professor of the English Department at Rangoon University.

=== Bible school ===
In accordance with the recommendation from Rev. Soward, the Bible school began at Tedim in 1953 under the supervision of Rev. S.T. Hau Go with Saya Lun Cung Nung and others. When Rev. S.T. Hau Go served as ZBC Secretary, the Bible school was moved to Hakha under the supervision of the Johnsons (Rev. Robert Johnson). Then, the school was moved from Hakha to Falam in 1959. The name of the Bible school has been changed throughout history and as of 2013, it was named Chin Christian Institute of Theology. The college was accepted as a member institute of the Association for Theological Education in South East Asia in 1982. The bible school Bachelor of Theology (B.Th) was accredited by the Association for Theological Education in South East Asia in 1991. The Bible school now offered Agricultural studies in their course.

The mission hospital never materialized. Although there was a medical doctor who wanted to come and work in the Chin Hills. The allotment for equipment of $30,000 had to be diverted to another place.

== Schism and formation of Zomi Baptist Convention of Myanmar ==
In 1995, the four Associations, namely Tonzang Township Baptist Association (TTBA), Tedim Baptist Association (TBA), Kale Zomi Baptist Association (KZBA), and Tamu Valley Baptist Association (TVBA) walked out from the ZBC triennial meetings at Khuasak during 5–9 April 1995 and formed an organization called Zomi Baptist Convention of Myanmar (ZBCM). Out of the four associations, three of them went on and decided to join Southern Baptist Convention and Tedim Baptist Association alone withdraws from ZBCM and decided to remain in the Myanmar Baptist Convention.

== Zomi Baptist Convention (ZBC) to Chin Baptist Convention (CBC) ==
The name of the organization was changed from 'Zomi Baptist Convention' to 'Chin Baptist Convention' with effect from 1 April 2013. The agreement was reached during Zomi Baptist Convention's 21st Triennial Conference held in Kalaymyo of Sagaing Division from 21 to 24 March. During this meeting, the Association, namely Kalay Valley Baptist Association (KVBA), walked out again and formed an organization called Kalay Valley Baptist Convention (KVBC). There, the rest of the other 25 associations, a unanimous agreement was reached for the new designation of the Chin Baptist organization. The meeting was attended by more than 400 representatives from its 28 associations, with special guests from the Myanmar Baptist Convention and Kachin Baptist Convention.

== Affiliated organizations ==
In addition to the Myanmar Baptist Convention, the convention is affiliated with Asia Pacific Baptist Federation and Baptist World Alliance and has a fellowship and works with the ecumenical organizations like Myanmar Council of Churches, Christian Conference of Asia, World Council of Churches and World Association for Christian Communication.

== Membership trends and associations ==
In 2013, the Chin Baptist Convention reported 202,991 members in 38,145 households in 893 churches. The current general secretary is Rev. Stanley Hlawn Hmung. The church's motto is Faith, Unity and Witness.
