= Tlangpi =

- Village
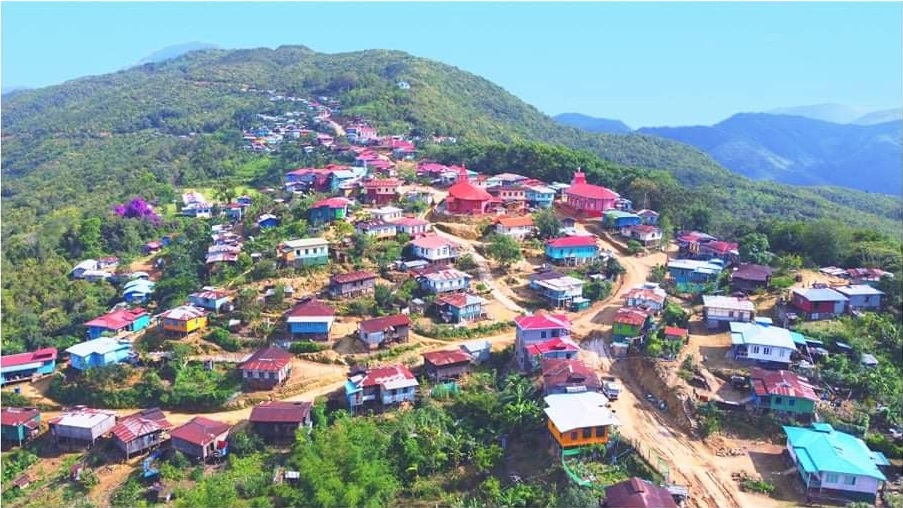
- An Aerial Photography of Tlangpi 2023

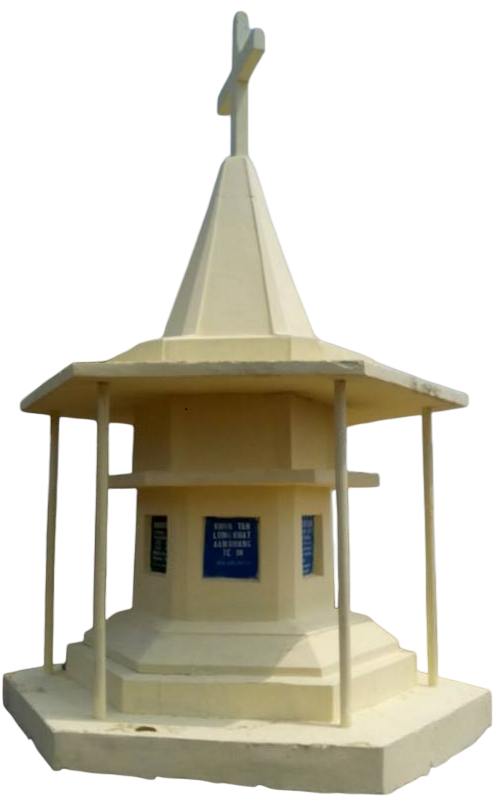
- Seal
- Motto: 'Khuaṭan Lungkhat, Aanruangte In.'
- Anthem: 'Semnak Khuazung Tlangpi Khuadawh'
- Interactive map of Tlangpi
- Coordinates: 22°58′39″N 93°19′36″E
- Country: Myanmar
- State: Chin State
- District: Hakha
- Township: Thantlang
- Highest elevation: 1,530 m (5,020 ft)

Population
  - Total: 1,648
- 2014 Myanmar Census
- Time zone: GMT+6:30

Tlangpi (Burmese: တလန်ပီးရွာ) also known as Klangpi is a mountainous village of Chin people in Thantlang Township, Chin State, Myanmar. It is located in the west of Chin State, 13 km away from the south of Camp Victoria, Headquarters of Chin National Front at India-Myanmar border. In the 2014 Myanmar Census, the population in Tlangpi was 1,648 (females: 823 and males: 825). There were 346 'conventional households' in Tlangpi in 2014.

== History ==
In The Chin Hills Book Vol I and II 1896, Carey, British Political Officer in the Chin Hills and Tuck, British Assistant Political Officer in the Chin Hills, mentioned Tlangpi as ‘Klangpi’ that had 70 houses. In contrast, in the Chin-Lushai Land Book 1893, British Surgeon Lieutenant Colonel Reid correctly spelt the village name as 'Tlangpi' that had 100 houses when he visited Tlangpi village in February 1890. In 1896, the houses in Tlangpi were built with bamboo in the manner of Lushai (Mizo) style. Approximately in 1850, the Lai people of Vanzang village established Tlangpi village which now constitutes one of the six villages in Vanzang Hill Tract. In the Chin Hills Vol II, Carey and Tuck noted that they visited Tlangpi village in 1892 when the village Chief was Kil Hmung who led a group of Lai people to establishing Tlangpi village.

Until 1895, Chinland (also known as Chin State or the Chin Hills) including Tlangpi was a sovereign territory with its own ruling system of chieftainship. In 1872, 1888, 1889-1890 and 1895, the British invaded Chinland for colonisation. After the 1895 invasion, the British declared that Chinland was a British Colony separately. The British legislated the Chin Hills Regulation (1896) to rule the Chin people in the Chin Hills and Lushai Hills. The British did not abolish the Chin ruling system of chieftainship. Under the Chin Hills Regulation (1896), they applied the indirect rule to Chin people through the existing Chin Chiefs.

In 1947, Mang Ling had served as Tlangpi Chief under the Hakha sub-division of the British Colony. Tlangpi Chief was one of the 19 Chin Hills Chiefs representing the Chin people's wish to the Frontier Areas Committee of Enquiry. The committee was formed to unify the Frontier Areas and 'Ministerial Burma' with the Frontier Areas people's 'free consent' before the British conferred independence upon Burma in 1948.

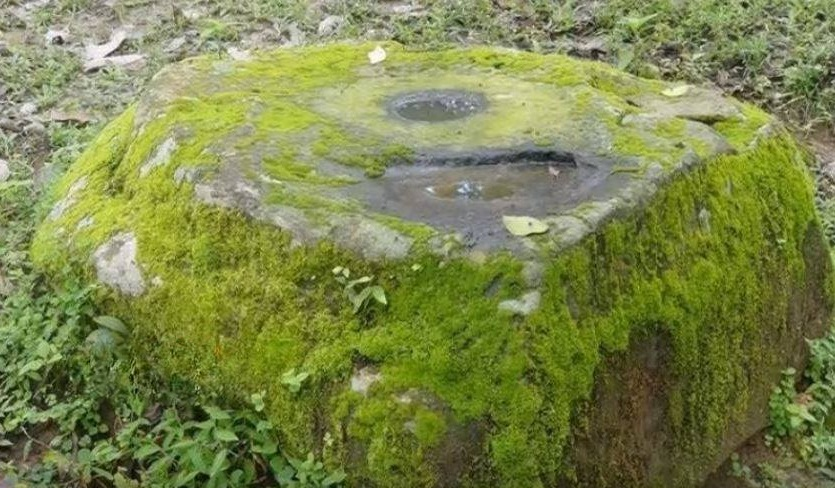
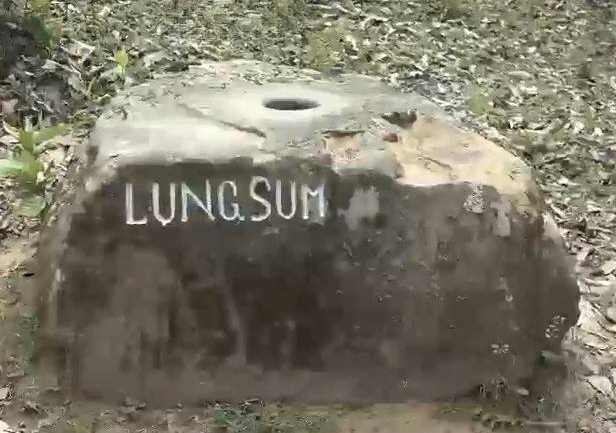
The bedrock mortar in Tlangpi, 2014 and 2018.

Tlangpi has a bedrock mortar site at its northern outskirt. It is locally known as 'lungsum', literally meaning 'rock mortar'. Prehistoric peoples used this type of bedrock mortars to grind foods. Their use of bedrock mortars was world-wide from Americas to Asia.

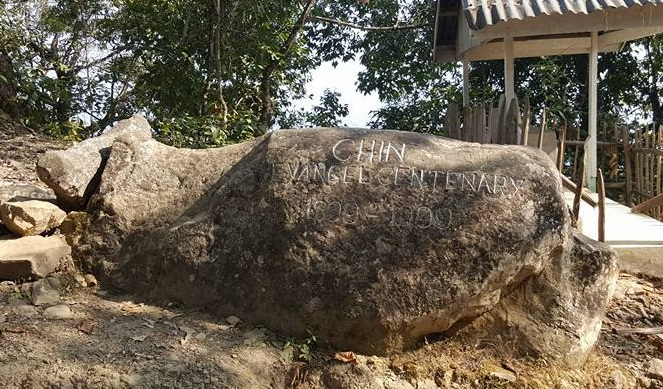
The bedrock gayal in Tlangpi, 2015.

Just a stone's throw from the site of the bedrock mortar at the northern outskirt of Tlangpi, there exists a bedrock gayal (also known as mithun) which Tlangpi villagers call 'Lungsia', literally meaning 'rock gayal'. It is unknown whether the bedrock gayal is nature-made or historically man-made.

== Geography ==
Tlangpi is a mountainous village bordering Tahtlang Village in the east, Zaangtlang Village in the west, Farrawn Village in the south and Lungding Village in the southwest. Tlangpi is located between Tio River in the north, Lahva River in the east and Thingva Creek in the west. Its steep places are the characteristic features of Tlangpi. Tlangpi is in the elevation at 1,530 metres (5,020 feet) above the sea level.

== Education ==
Tlangpi has two Primary Schools and one Middle School operated by Myanmar Government. It also has a nursery school called 'M. Za To Lian Nursery School' run by its residents.

== Notable people ==
- David Van Bik (1926 – 2000), the Lai [Hakha Chin] Bible translator, the author of Chin-English and English-Chin dictionaries, an ordained Christian minister, and a recipient of Doctor of Divinity from Berkeley School of Theology, USA.
