= Daniel E. Wonderly =

American biologist

- Born: April 21, 1922; Mountain Lake Park, Maryland
- Died: December 3, 2004 (aged 82); Oakland, Maryland
- Education: Southeastern Bible College; Wheaton College; Central Baptist Seminary; Ohio University
- Known for: Old-earth creationism
- Spouse: Edna Wonderly (née Giese)
- Children: Eunice Stackhouse; Philip Wonderly
- Scientific career
- Fields: Biology
- Institutions: Wingate College; Grace College
- Thesis: A comparative study of the gross anatomy of the digestive system of some North American salamanders (1961)

Daniel E. Wonderly (April 21, 1922 – December 3, 2004) was an American biologist and old-earth creationist who taught at Grace College, where he helped to establish the biology department.

== Biography ==
Wonderly was born on April 21, 1922, in Mountain Lake Park, Maryland, to Earl and Gustava Wonderly. After graduating from Oakland High School in Oakland, Maryland in 1940, he attended the Southeastern Bible College for two years. He was then drafted into the United States Army, in which capacity he served in both Japan and Europe during World War II. After the war, he returned to the United States to attend Wheaton College, where he earned a Bachelor of Arts degree in anthropology in 1949. He then enrolled at Central Baptist Seminary in Kansas City, Kansas, from which he received a Bachelor of Divinity degree and a Master of Theology degree in 1952 and 1955, respectively. In 1961, he earned a Master of Science degree in zoology from Ohio University; he began teaching at Wingate College the same year. He joined the faculty of Grace College in 1966 and continued to teach there until 1973. From 1974 to 1977, he wrote the book God's Time-Records in Ancient Sediments with the aim of educating his fellow Christians about the geology of sedimentary rocks. He followed this with a second book, Neglect of Geologic Data: Sedimentary Strata Compared with Young-Earth Creationist Writings, which was published in 1987. He died on December 3, 2004, at Garrett County Memorial Hospital in Oakland.

== Views on creationism ==
Despite being a theologically conservative Baptist, Wonderly accepted the scientific evidence that the Earth was much older than young-earth creationists believe it to be. In explaining his views on evolution and the age of the Earth, he wrote, "Christians need to reject evolutionism, but when they reject true scientific discoveries they bring disgrace upon the Bible and Christianity." He supported reconciling the old age of the Earth with the teachings of the Bible by means of day-age creationism. When administrators at Grace College learned about Wonderly's unfavorable views of young-earth creationism and flood geology, they agreed to hire him only on the condition that he not interfere with the College's commitment to advancing young-earth creationism. Wonderly agreed, but after some of his students found out about his views, the College's president banned Wonderly from further discussing his views at all, prompting Wonderly to resign. Prominent young-earth creationist Henry Morris defended Grace's handling of Wonderly's anti-creationist views, arguing that these views were already receiving a fair hearing throughout society.
