= Hkalam Samson =

Rev. Hkalam Samson
- President of the Kachin Baptist Convention
- Native name: ခလမ်ဆမ်ဆန်
- Church: Kachin Baptist Convention
- Province: Kachin State, Myanmar
- In office: 2018–2023

Personal details
- Born: c. 1958 Kachin State, Myanmar
- Denomination: Baptist
- Residence: Myitkyina, Kachin State
- Occupation: Pastor, human rights advocate

Hkalam Samson (Burmese: ခလမ်ဆမ်ဆန်; born circa 1958) is a Kachin Baptist pastor and human rights advocate from Myanmar. He has served as the president of the Kachin Baptist Convention (KBC), an organization representing a significant portion of the Kachin people. Samson has been an outspoken critic of the Myanmar military and a vocal proponent for religious freedom and the rights of ethnic minorities. His advocacy has brought him to international platforms, including a meeting at the White House. In 2022, he has faced persecution from the Myanmar military junta, leading to his arrest and imprisonment.

== Early life and education ==
In 1999, Samson received his Master of Arts in Theology from Providence Theological Seminary in Otterburne, Manitoba, Canada. He also holds a Bachelor of Divinity and a Doctor of Ministry from the Myanmar Institute of Theology in Yangon. Providence Theological Seminary later awarded him an honorary doctorate for his significant work and leadership.

== Advocacy ==
Samson has been at the forefront of humanitarian efforts, particularly in aiding internally displaced persons (IDPs) in Kachin State, a region long affected by conflict between the Kachin Independence Army (KIA) and the Myanmar military. He has also been a key figure in peace talks and has worked to foster understanding between different faith communities. Samson is the chairman of the Kachin National Consultative Assembly, an umbrella organization that unites various Kachin civil society and political groups. His work has focused on advocating for a federal system of government in Myanmar.

In July 2019, Samson joined a group of survivors of religious persecution from several countries in a meeting with then-U.S. President Donald Trump at the White House, held during the second Ministerial to Advance Religious Freedom. At the event, Samson highlighted the military's oppression of Christians in Myanmar. His remarks prompted a military officer to file a criminal complaint against him upon his return, though the case was later dropped following international pressure, including from the U.S. State Department.

Following the 2021 Myanmar coup d'état, Samson was arrested on December 4, 2022, at Mandalay International Airport while preparing to travel to Bangkok, Thailand, for medical treatment. He was later charged with several offenses, including unlawful association under Section 17(1) of the Unlawful Associations Act, incitement under Section 505(a) of the Penal Code, and violations under the Counter-Terrorism Law. His arrest drew strong condemnation from human rights organizations such as Human Rights Watch, as well as from foreign governments including the United States, who called for his immediate and unconditional release.

On April 7, 2023, a special court inside Myitkyina Prison sentenced him to six years in prison. On April 17, 2024, as part of a traditional New Year amnesty, He was released from prison. However, his freedom was short-lived. Just hours after returning home, he was taken back into custody by military authorities. The reason given for his re-arrest was for discussions related to the peace process, though he was reportedly not involved in any such talks during his subsequent detention.

After months of continued detention, he was finally released on July 22, 2024. His release was welcomed by the U.S. State Department.
