= Telugu Baptist Church Council =

- Abbreviation: TBCC
- Classification: Protestant
- Orientation: Evangelical
- Scripture: Bible
- Polity: Congregational
- President: Rev. P. Bhagyanand
- General Secretary: Rev. K. Victor Emmanuel
- Region: Andhra Pradesh and Telangana
- Language: Telugu
- Headquarters: Guntur, Andhra Pradesh
- Founder: American Baptist International Ministries
- Origin: 2007; Ongole, Andhra Pradesh
- Congregations: 1,200+
- Members: 979,700
- Ministers: 1,000+
- Official website: telugubaptist.com

The Telugu Baptist Church Council (TBCC) is a Baptist Christian denomination in the states of Andhra Pradesh and Telangana in India. The churches are part of the Telugu Christian community of Southern India.

== History ==
Telugu Baptist Church Council, previously known as Baptist Convention of Telugu Churches, was established by Rev. P. Jayachandra Rao from Chebrolu, Andhra Pradesh. The Baptist Convention of Telugu Churches was formed on January 15, 2007. The Baptist Convention of Telugu Churches was formed to unite Telugu Baptist churches in India that are related to the American Baptist International Ministries. 16,000 Telugu Baptist delegates were present in the formation celebration in Ongole, Andhra Pradesh. According to a census published by the association in 2023, it claimed 764 Telugu Baptist Churches, 1,484 preaching places and 979,700 baptized members.

== Administration ==
The governing body is called as the Executive Committee and under the Executive Committee are 15 departments called as Missions & Services namely Evangelism, SEDP (Socio, economic, development projects), Adult Literacy Programme, Women ministries, Youth ministries, Children ministries, Theological Endeavour, Educational Institutions, Medical services, Tribal ministries, Baptist Publications etc., TBCC has 5 zones and 30 field associations in the States of Andhra Pradesh and Telangana.
