= Chin Association for Christian Communication =

Non-profit organization in Myanmar

- Abbreviation: CACC
- Formation: 1988 -->
- Type: Non-profit, faith-based organization
- Purpose: Preservation of Chin culture and language
- Region served: Burma
- Official language: Chin

The Chin Association for Christian Communication (CACC) is non-profit, faith-based organization dedicated to the preservation of Chin culture and language. CACC is located in Hakha, Burma. The most well-known projects and activities undertaken by CACC are revising and updating Laiholh (also known as Hakha-Chin language). At the moment, CACC is in-charge of standardizing Laiholh, the most widely spoken Chin dialects in Burma. Though there is no common language or official language in Chin State, Laiholh is used as a medium of communication among different Chin groups in Hakha, Thantlang, Matupi, Falam (a different Lai dialect), Burma, and diasporas all over the world.

== History ==
CACC was started in 1988 with the intention of furthering Chin's language and facilitating communication among Laiholh speakers in central Chin State, Burma. The founding members of CACC were Hakha Baptist Association, Thantlang Association of Baptist Churches, Matu Association of Baptist Churches, Matu Baptist Association, Zotung Baptist Association, Chin Baptist Association (Kaleymyo), and Gangaw Baptist Association. Originally, the organization was called Chin Christian Literature Society. In 1993, the member associations decided to change the name to Chin Association for Christian Communication (CACC) to reflect the broader aim of the organization.

Today, CACC members consist of thirteen regional baptist associations and local members in Mandalay, Yangon, and other cities in Burma. In addition, with the recent surge in the Chin diaspora population in western countries, CACC now has members from Australia, Europe, and United States. The largest financial supporter is Chin Baptist Churches, USA (CBCUSA), with its headquarters in Indianapolis, Indiana.

In March 2013, CACC celebrated its Silver Jubilee in Hakha, Chin State. The event was attended by guests from the United States, Mizoram, India, and Chins from all over Burma.

== Activities ==
In 2011, CACC completed the sixth revision of Chin's writing system. This latest revision was a collaboration of Chin's linguists from the United States and Burma. The revision purportedly followed international linguistic standard. In 2012, CACC joined with Lairam Jesus Christ Baptist Church, Lawngtlai, India to work together to strengthen Chin's literature in Mizoram. The collaboration resulted in the introduction of Laiholh in Lai Autonomous District, an area occupied by mainly Lai people within Mizoram. In 2013, Lairam Media Group started the first news program in Laiholh from Lawngtlai, Mizoram.

== K-12 Curriculum ==
CACC produced text books in Laiholh from elementary through 10th grade. Most of the new text books produced are being used in local churches in Chin State and Burma, and heavily used in local Chin churches in Europe, Australia, Malaysia, India, and United States. Since the Burmese government prevented the teaching of Chin dialects in government schools in Burma, many young Chins grew up not having a good command of their native language. There is now great effort among Chin people, especially Laiholh speakers, to revive Chin literature in abroad and in Burma with the nominal civilian government relaxing its restriction on teaching native languages.

== Controversy ==
Recently, there was controversy between the Maras and CACC because one of the text books produced by CACC for Laiholh language learner in Australia included derogatory comments about missionary Authur Lorraine. The CACC and Maras resolved the misunderstanding as the comments were inadvertently included in the textbooks.

In 2012, CACC and leaders from Matupi agreed to have Laica or Hakha-Chin taught in government schools in Matupi should the government approve the teaching of ethnic languages. This would mean that Laica would be taught in primary schools in Hakha, Thantlang, and Matupi townships. Before this agreement was implemented, Matu from Yangon, mainly of Roman Catholic background, objected and formed their own Matu literature committee. The committee later voted to have Matu language taught in Matupi area if government approval is granted.

== See also ==
- CACC Laica Tialning 2011
