= Thuam Hang =

Burmese convert to Christianity

Pu Thuam Hang (born 1870), chief of Khuasak, was one of the first Christian converts among the Zomi (Chin) in Chin State, Burma.

Reverend Arthur E. Carlson and Mrs. Laura Carlson, Swedish-American Baptist missionaries, came to Hakha, Chin State, Burma, in 1899. This couple sent a Kayin pastor named Saya Shwe Zan to Khuasak to preach about Christianity, as they had heard that the Sizang people could understand the Burmese language. Pu Thuam Hang was at first reluctant to convert, as he was concerned over the resulting loss of social and economic status. Two of his sons suffered from illnesses; after one was cured by Dr. Eric Hjalmar East, and the other apparently miraculously, Pu Thuam Hang was converted. Dr. East baptized Pu Thuam Hang and Thuam Hang's wife on 15 May 1905 along with the first Chin Christian converted Pu Pau Suan. Pu Pau Suan received Jesus Christ as his personal savior and his wife Pi Kham Ciang converted on 10 July 1904. Pu Thuam Hang was later ordained.
