= Chin State Cultural Museum =

- Location: Hakha, Chin State, Myanmar
- Coordinates: 22.64526900338562°N 93.59462175432455°E
- Type: Cultural Museum
- Accreditation: Ministry of Religious Affairs and Culture (Myanmar)

The Chin State Cultural Museum is a museum in Chin State, Myanmar that displays bronzeware, silverware, traditional attire, household utensils made of bamboo, clay-pipes, musical instruments, and weapons of the ethnic Chin people. It is located on Bogyoke Road, in Hakha, the capital of Chin State.
