= Southeastern Bible College =

Christian college in Birmingham, Alabama, USA

Coordinates: 33.450646°N 86.74367°W

- Former name: Birmingham School of the Bible
- Type: Private
- Active: 1935–2017
- Affiliations: Christian
- President: Dr. Alex Granados
- Chief Executive Officer: Dr. Alex Granados
- Students: 189
- Location: Birmingham, Alabama, United States
- Website: www.sebc.edu

Southeastern Bible College was a private Christian Bible college in Birmingham, Alabama, United States. The school's 22-acre (8.9 ha) campus was located in the suburbs south of the downtown Birmingham area. It was accredited by the Association for Biblical Higher Education.

Southeastern Bible College offered bachelor's and associate degrees through both a traditional day program and an adult evening program for students age 25 and up. Graduates are serving in various roles of ministry throughout the world as senior pastors, associate pastors, missionaries, teachers and counselors as well as various other positions in both public and private business.

Southeastern Bible College was a non-denominational Christian college and attracted students from a broad range of Christian faiths, including Baptist, Methodist, Presbyterian, Church of God, Assemblies of God, and non-denominational churches. Students applying for admission were required to agree with core principles of the Christian faith, including faith in Jesus as Savior and belief in the Bible as the inspired word of God.

The college ceased operations in June 2017 due to financial challenges. Three months later, the college's board of trustees announced a merger with Piedmont International University which is now Carolina University.
