= Immanuel Baptist Church (Yangon, Burma) =

Church in Yangon, Myanmar

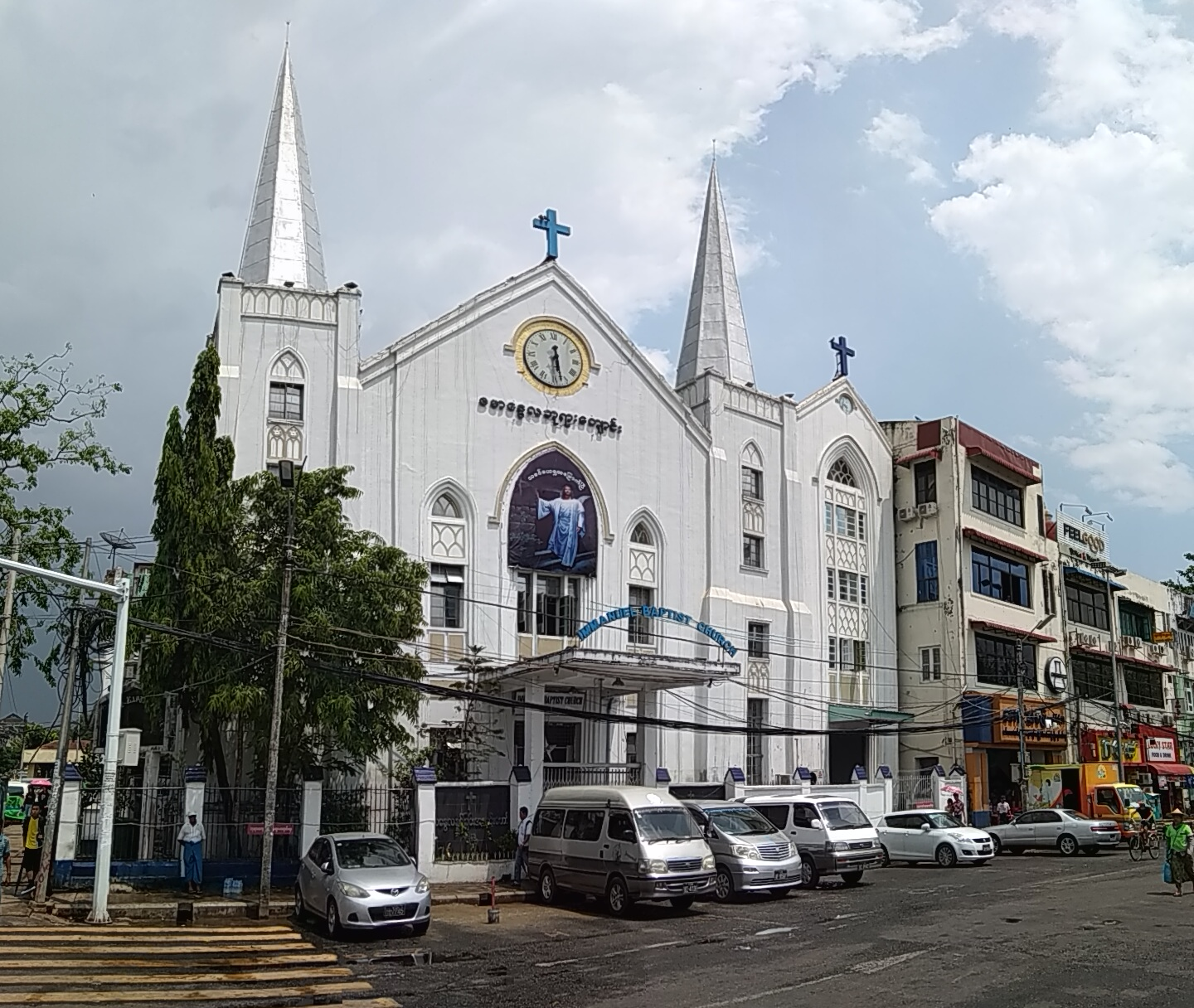
- Immanuel Baptist Church
- 16°46′26.6″N 96°09′37.4″E
- Location: 411, Mahar Bandoola Garden Street and Mahar Bandoola Road, Yangon
- Country: Myanmar
- Denomination: Baptist

History
- Founded: 1885

Architecture
- Completed: 1885

Designations

Yangon City Landmark

Immanuel Baptist Church is a Baptist church in central Yangon at the corner of Mahar Bandoola Garden Street and Mahar Bandoola Road opposite Yangon City Hall.

== History ==
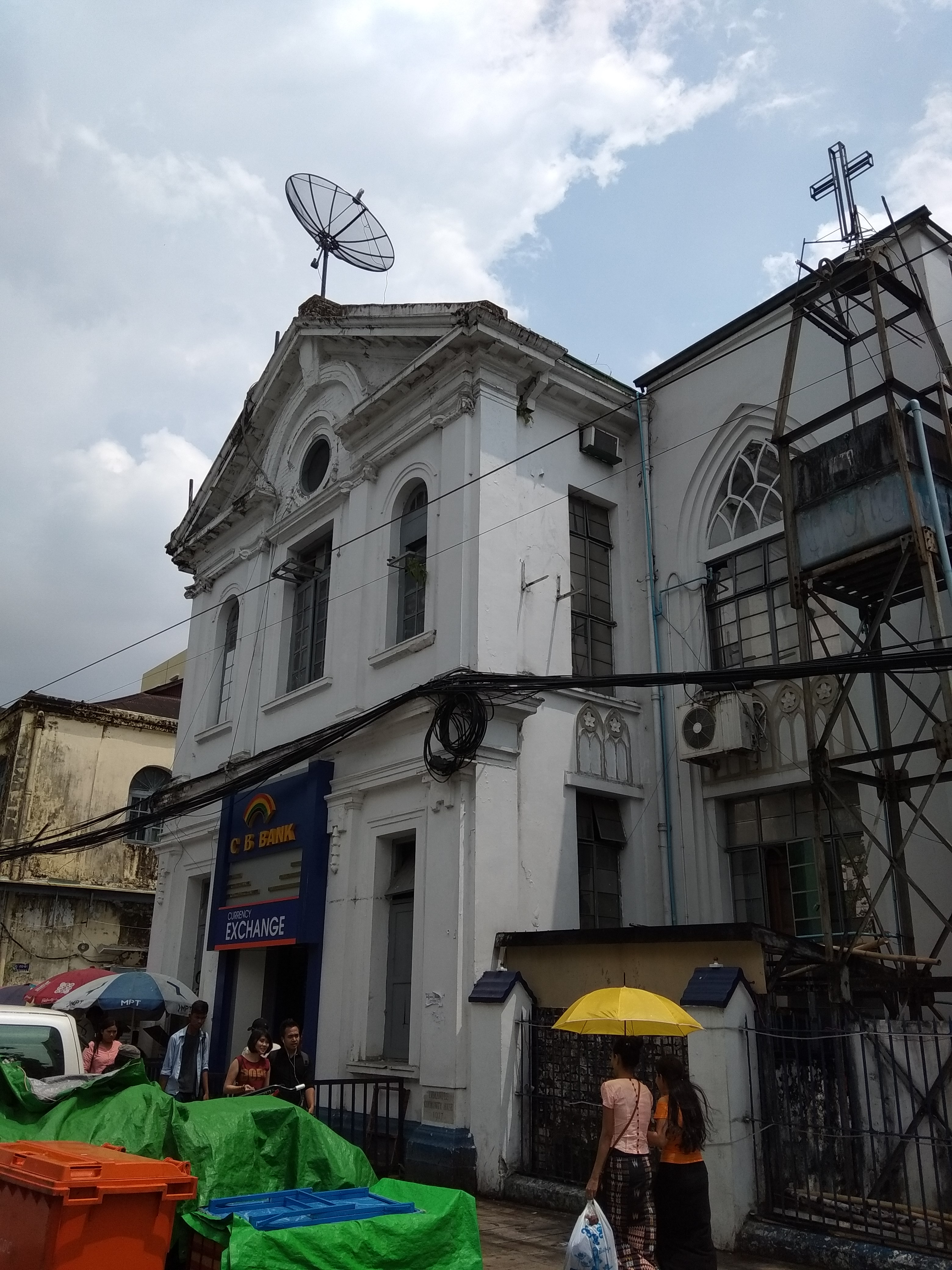
Immanuel Baptist Church community house.

Built in 1885 by an American missionary, the church was destroyed during World War II but rebuilt in 1952. Until 1965, the pastor of the church was sent by the American Baptist International Ministries, which at that time was called the American Baptist Foreign Mission Society. One of the founders of that missionary organisation was Adoniram Judson, who lived in Burma from 1813 to his death in 1850. The church is on the Yangon City Heritage List, a list of man-made landmarks designated by the governmental Yangon City Development Committee.

In the early 1960s over 90 percent of the congregation were Burmese, including ethnically Anglo-Indian and Anglo-Burmese.

== Pastors ==
- 1951-1959 Brown, Rev. Russell E.
- 1960-1965 Allen, Bradley Moore
- 1965-1967 Unknown
- 1967-1990 Poba, George C.
- 1990-2013 F. John, Paul
- 2013-Current Rev.D Yaw Lar

== See also ==
- Myanmar Baptist Convention
