= Immanuel Baptist Church (Rochester, New York) =

Historic church in New York, United States

- U.S. National Register of Historic Places
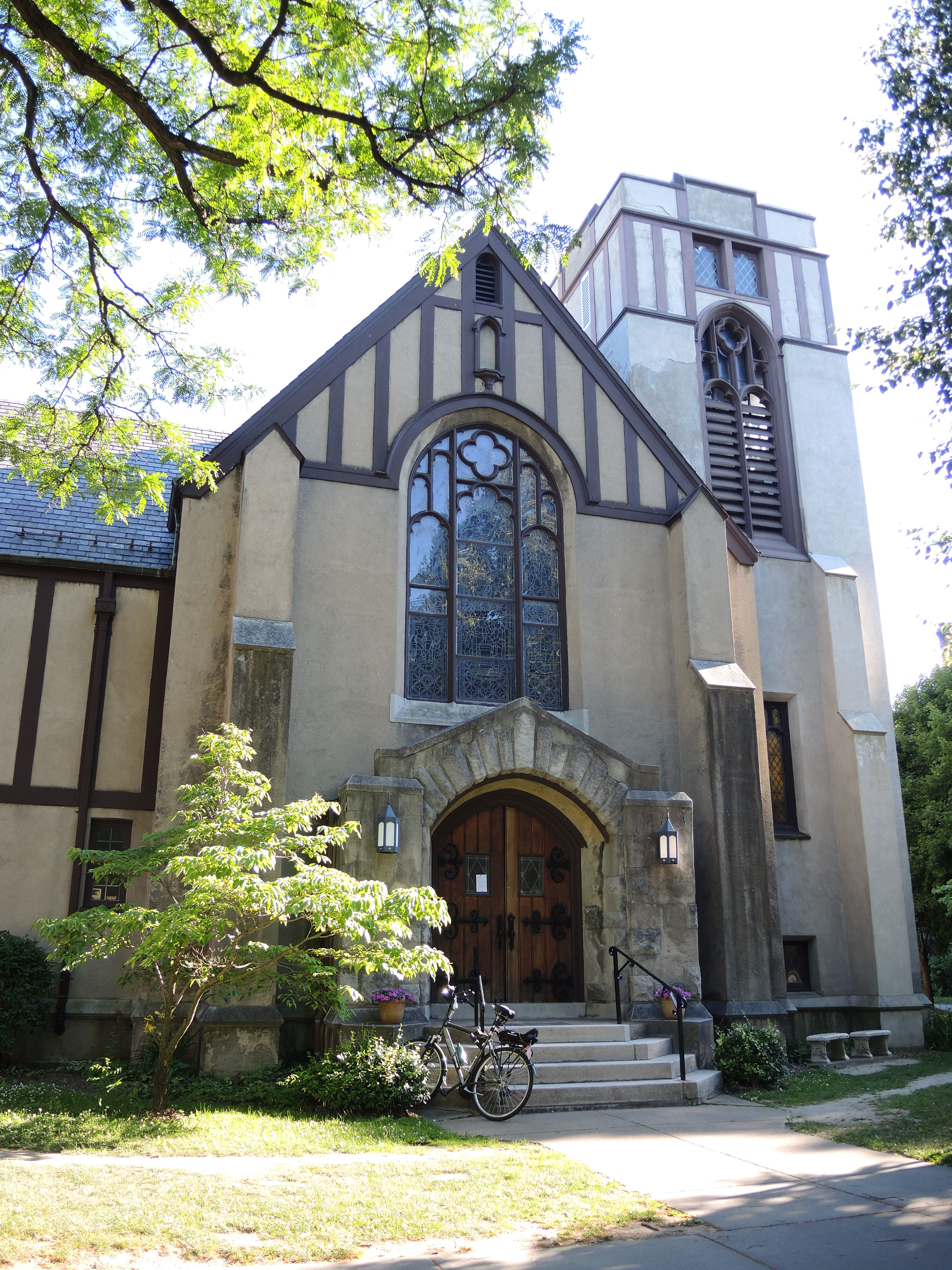

- Location within New York Location within the United States
- Location: 815 Park Ave., Rochester, New York
- Coordinates: 43°8′48″N 77°34′28″W
- Area: 0.5 acres (0.20 ha)
- Built: 1925
- Architect: J. Foster Warner
- Architectural style: Tudor Revival
- NRHP reference No.: 01001566
- Added to NRHP: February 5, 2002

Immanuel Baptist Church is a historic Baptist church located at Rochester in Monroe County, New York. It is a Tudor Revival-style church building that consists of a 1 1/2-story front-gable auditorium connected to a T-plan 2 1/2-story school wing.

It was listed on the National Register of Historic Places in 2002.

== Gallery ==
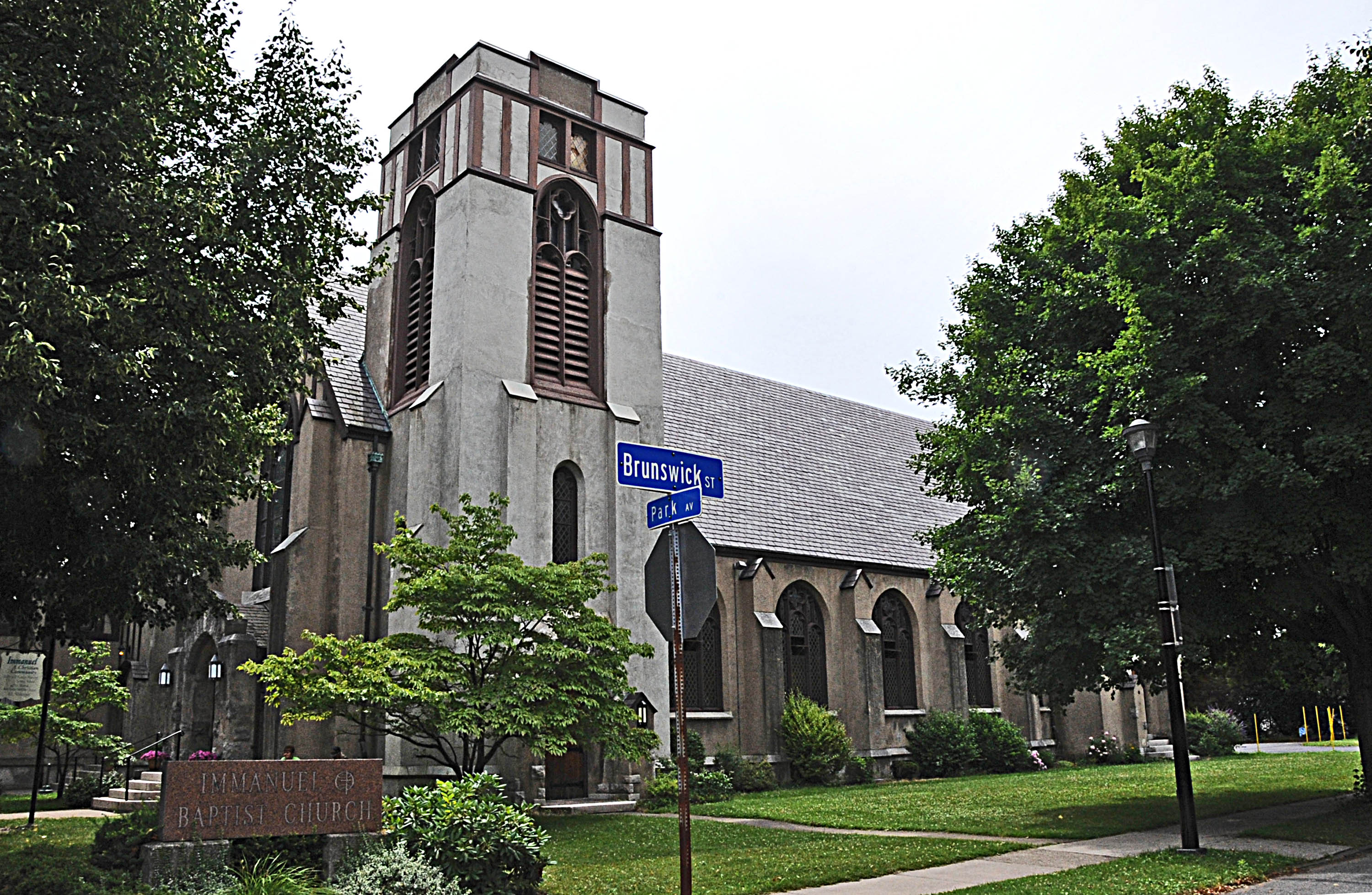

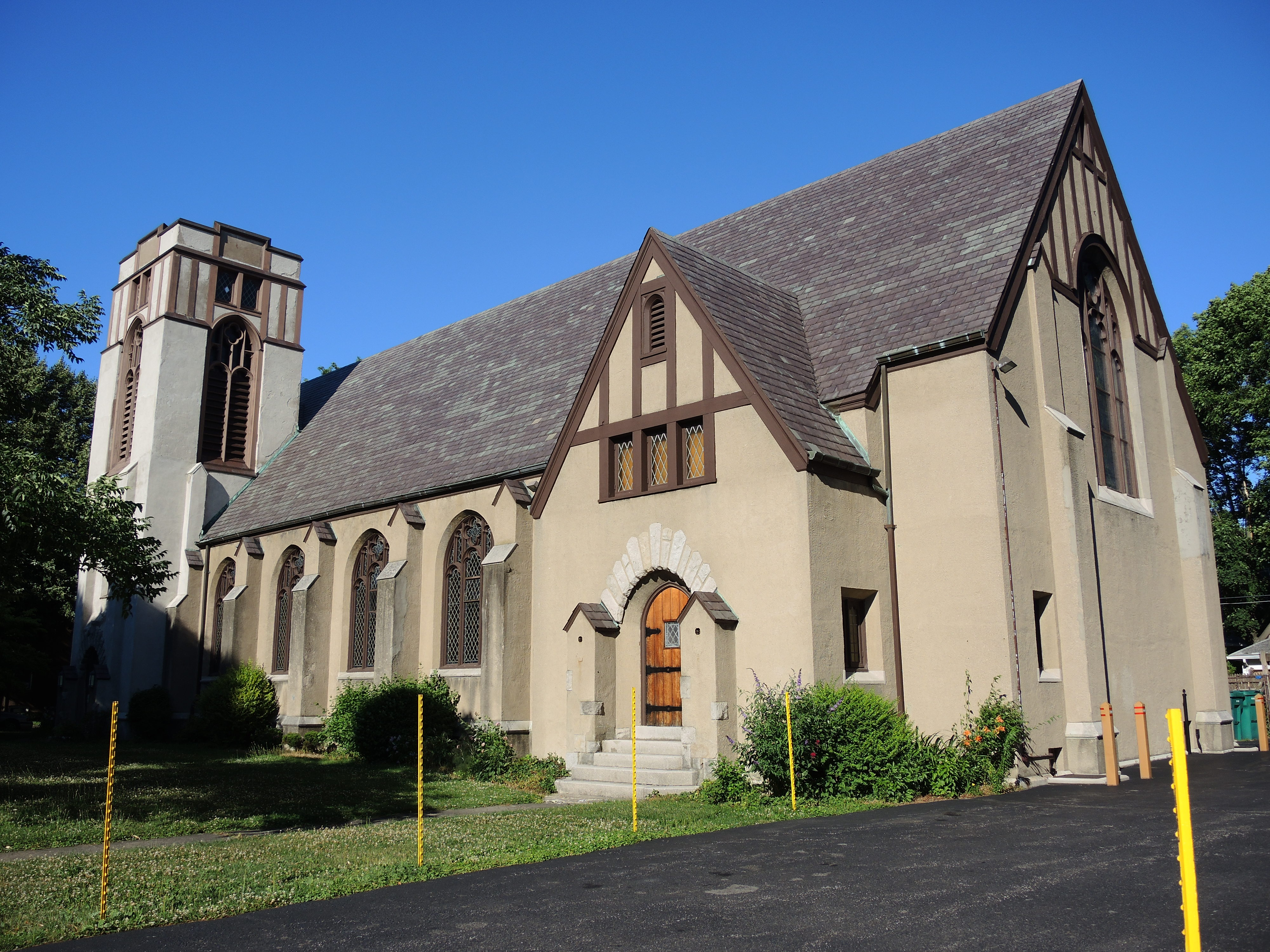
