= Chin Christian University =

University in Hakha, Chin State, Burma

- Motto: A Living Sacrifice. Rom. 12:1
- Type: Private
- Established: 1990; 36 years ago
- Affiliations: Chin Association for Christian Communication
- President: Rev Dr Luke Sui Kung Ling
- Students: 350
- Location: Hakha, Chin State, Burma
- Website: ccu.edu.mm

Chin Christian University (CCU) is a Christian university in Hakha, Chin State, Burma. CCU is one of the departments of Chin Association of Christian Communication (CACC). After 25 years of its establishment (1990-2015), the college was transformed into a university, and its name changed to Chin Christian University by the 9th Triennial Meeting of Chin Association of Christian Communication, held at Hakha Khuahlun Baptist Church on April 4, 2015.

Today, CCU is one of the full-fledged accredited members of the Association for Theological Education in South East Asia (ATESEA).

CCU accepts students from variety denominations and from different parts of Myanmar such as Kachins, Nagas and Burmese.

== History ==
Rev Dr Chester U. Strait and spouse, an American Baptist missionary couple to the Chins, started a Bible school in Hakha in 1928. The school was closed in 1932. To meet the needs of the growing churches, two Bible Schools were opened, one at Tiddim in 1947 running up to 1950 by Rev & Mrs Franklin and Phileda Nelsons (also American Baptist missionary couple), the other one at Hakha in 1948 running up to 1950 by Rev Dr & Mrs Robert G. and Elizabeth Johnsons, the last American Baptist missionary couple to the Chins. Because of the long furlough of the missionaries the two Bible Schools were discontinued and a new Bible School was started again at Tiddim in 1953, with Rev S.T. Hau Go (Native Chin) in charge. Rev S.T. Hau Go was elected as General Secretary of the newly formed Zomi Baptist Convention (Present Chin Baptist Convention) and thus moved to Falam. As a result, the Bible School was moved to Hakha in 1954 with a view that it would be better managed by the returned Johnsons. The Bible School was again moved from Hakha to Falam in 1959 in accordance with the decision of the Executive Committee of Zomi Baptist Convention.

The re-establishment of the Bible School in Hakha, as needs arose, began with an emergency meeting of the board of directors of Chin Christian Literature Society (CCLS) held on March 25, 1989 at U Pek Thang's residence in Falam. At that meeting, all attendants agreed and decided that CCLS found the Bible School in Hakha. At the same time a working committee was formed for the purpose of materializing the decision at that meeting. God blessed the diligent and restless work of the working committee and CCLS was able to open the Bible school in Hakha on June 1, 1990 with Diploma in Theology program, and was named Chin Bible School. The fourth CCLS board of directors meeting held at Hakha Baptist Association office in Hakha in 1993 changed the name to Chin Biblical Seminary. The name was changed for a third time to Chin Christian College (CCC) by the 8th CCLS Executive Committee meeting held at Thantlang Association of Baptist Churches (TABC) office on May 22, 1993. At the 2nd Triennial Meeting of CCLS, which was held on January 8–9, 1994 at Zion Baptist Church, Hakha, the name CCLS was changed to "Chin Association for Christian Communication" (CACC). The meeting also confirmed the Constitution of CACC and Chin Christian College functioned as the main ministry of the Education Department of CACC. Then, the secretary of Education Department of CACC, according to the then constitution, was the principal of CCC.

After 25 years, God blessed CCC's long vision: "To Transform the College into a University" and the name of the institution was changed into Chin Christian University by the 9th Triennial Meeting of CACC, held at Hakha Khuahlun Baptist Church on April 4, 2015. Today, CCU is one of the full-fledged accredited members of the Association for Theological Education in South East Asia (ATESEA). Up to March 2022, CCU has produced a total of 1552 graduates. At present, CCU has three departments: Theology, English Languages Studies, and Business Administration, with 23 full-time faculty members and 11 members of office staff.

== Principals ==
- Rev Dr Jones Mang Hope (1990), acting
- Rev Dr David Van Bik (1990−1996)
- Rev Dr John Cuai Sang (1996−1998)
- Rev Dr Hla Aung (1998−2004)

== Presidents ==
- Rev Dr Henry Siang Kung (2004−2020)
- Rev Dr Luke Sui Kung Ling (2021–present)

== Programs ==
The university offers the following degree programs:

- Diploma in Theology (DipTh)
- Bachelor of Theology (BTh)
- Bachelor of Ministry (BMin)
- Bachelor in Religious Education (BRE)
- Bachelor of Arts (English) (BA English)
- Bachelor of Business Administration (BA Business in 2014).
- Master of Divinity (MDiv)

The university has a rigorous academic curriculum and its reputation continues to grow in Burma. CCU is the only University in Chin State that offers Bachelor of Arts in English (BA English) & Bachelor of Business Administration (BBA). Most of the faculty members have degrees from well-known theological colleges from Asia, Europe, and the United States. CCU recently completed constructing additional academic buildings and a football field with the support of Chin people and Chin diasporas.

== Accreditation ==
CCU is accredited by Association for Theological Education in South East Asia (ATESEA).
