= Myanmar Baptist Convention =

Baptist Christian denomination in Myanmar

- မြန်မာနိုင်ငံနှစ်ခြင်း ခရစ်ယာန်အသင်းချုပ်
- Abbreviation: MBC
- Classification: Protestant
- Orientation: Baptist
- Theology: Evangelical Baptist
- Associations: Baptist World Alliance
- Headquarters: Yangon, Myanmar
- Origin: 1865
- Congregations: 5,494
- Members: 1,723,500
- Seminaries: 53
- Official website: mbc-1813.org

The Myanmar Baptist Convention (Burmese: မြန်မာနိုင်ငံနှစ်ခြင်း ခရစ်ယာန်အသင်းချုပ်, romanized: myanmarninengan nhaithkyinn hkaraityaran aasainnhkyaote) is a Baptist Christian denomination in Myanmar. It is affiliated with the Baptist World Alliance and the World Council of Churches. The headquarters is in Yangon.

== History ==
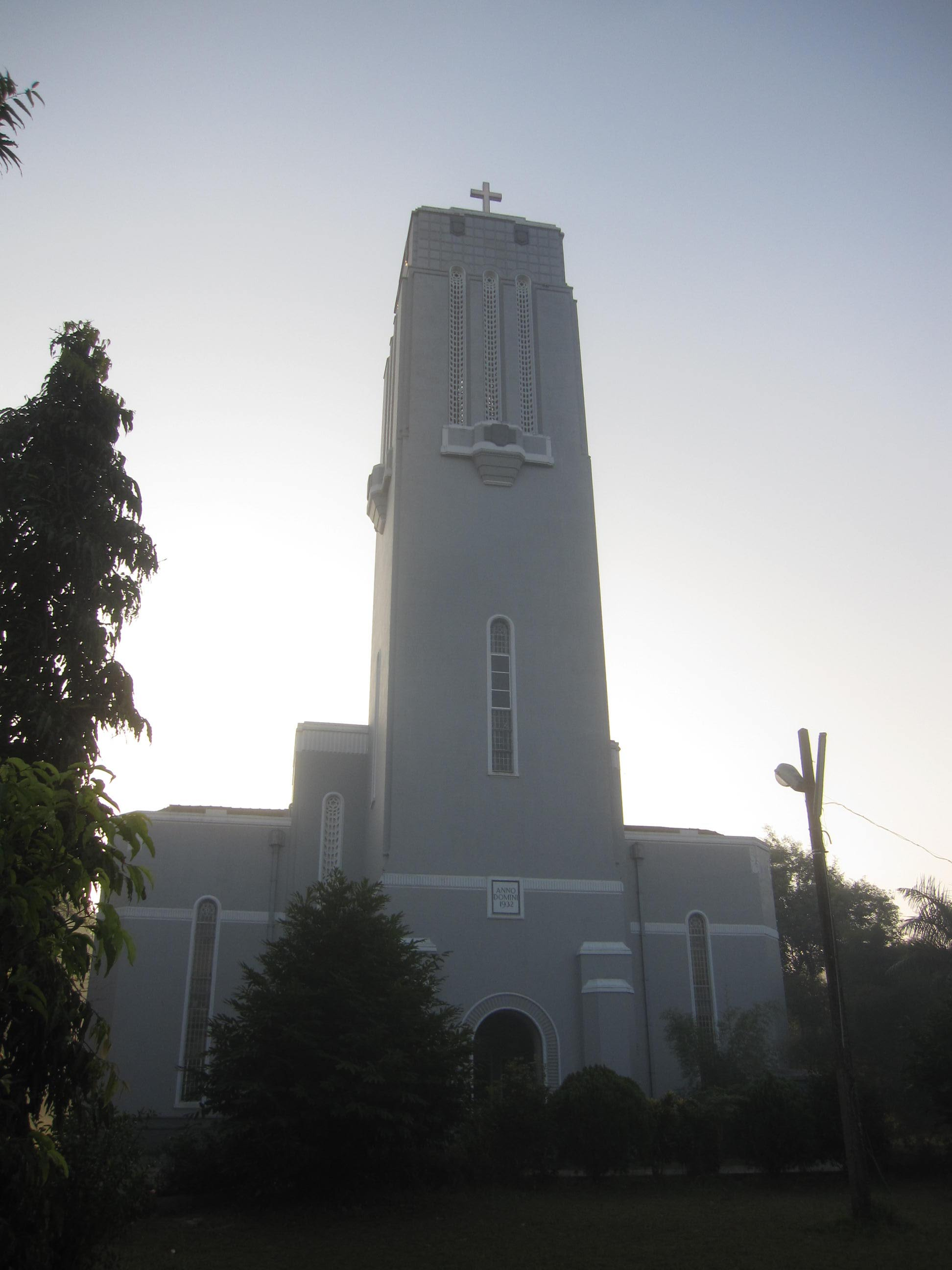
Judson Church in Yangon.

The Convention has its origins in an American mission of the American Baptist Mission (American Baptist Churches USA) in 1813 from Adoniram Judson and Ann Judson to Yangon. It was officially founded in 1865 as the Burma Baptist Missionary Convention. In 2006, it had 4,522 churches and 1,142,655 members. According to a census published by the association in 2025, it claimed 5,494 churches and 1,723,500 members.

== Member Associations ==
- Myanmar Baptist Churches Union
- Karen Baptist Convention
- Kachin Baptist Convention
- Lisu Baptist Convention
- Chin Baptist Convention
- Southern Shan State Baptist Home Mission Society
- Shweli Shan Baptist Convention
- Northern Shan State Baptist Convention
- Eastern Shan State Baptist Convention
- Akhar Baptist Convention
- Naga Baptist Convention
- Tedim Baptist Convention
- Asho Chin Baptist Convention
- Wa Baptist Convention
- Po Kayin Baptist Convention
- Rakhine Baptist Convention
- Mon Baptist Convention
- Lahu Baptist Convention
- Judson Church
- Immanuel Baptist Church

== Departments of Myanmar Baptist Convention ==
- Finance & Property
- Evangelism & Mission
- Christian Education
- Christian Communication
- Theological Education
- Christian Social and Service & Development
- Literature & Publication
- Leadership Development
- Ministers
- Men
- Women
- Youth

== Schools ==
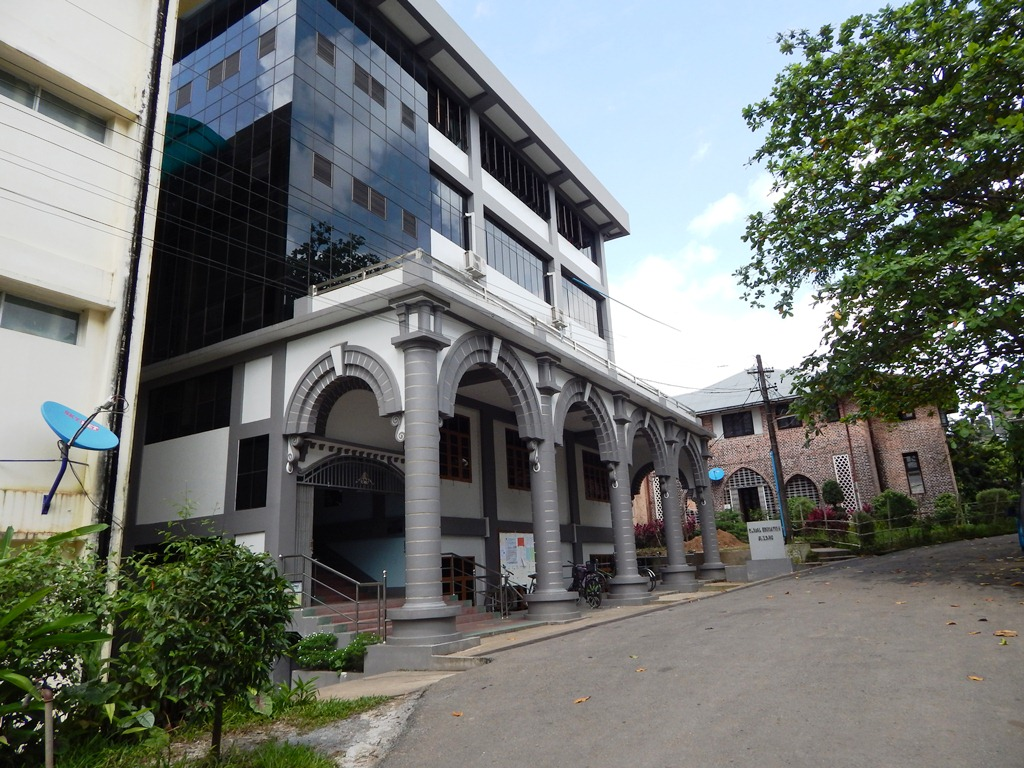
Myanmar Institute of Theology in Yangon.

It has 49 affiliated institutes of theology. The main is the Myanmar Institute of Theology, founded in 1927 and located in Insein.

== See also ==
- Bible
- Born again
- Baptist beliefs
- Jesus Christ
- Believers' Church
