= Immanuel Baptist Church (Salt Lake City) =

Historic church in Salt Lake City, Utah, U.S.

- U.S. National Register of Historic Places
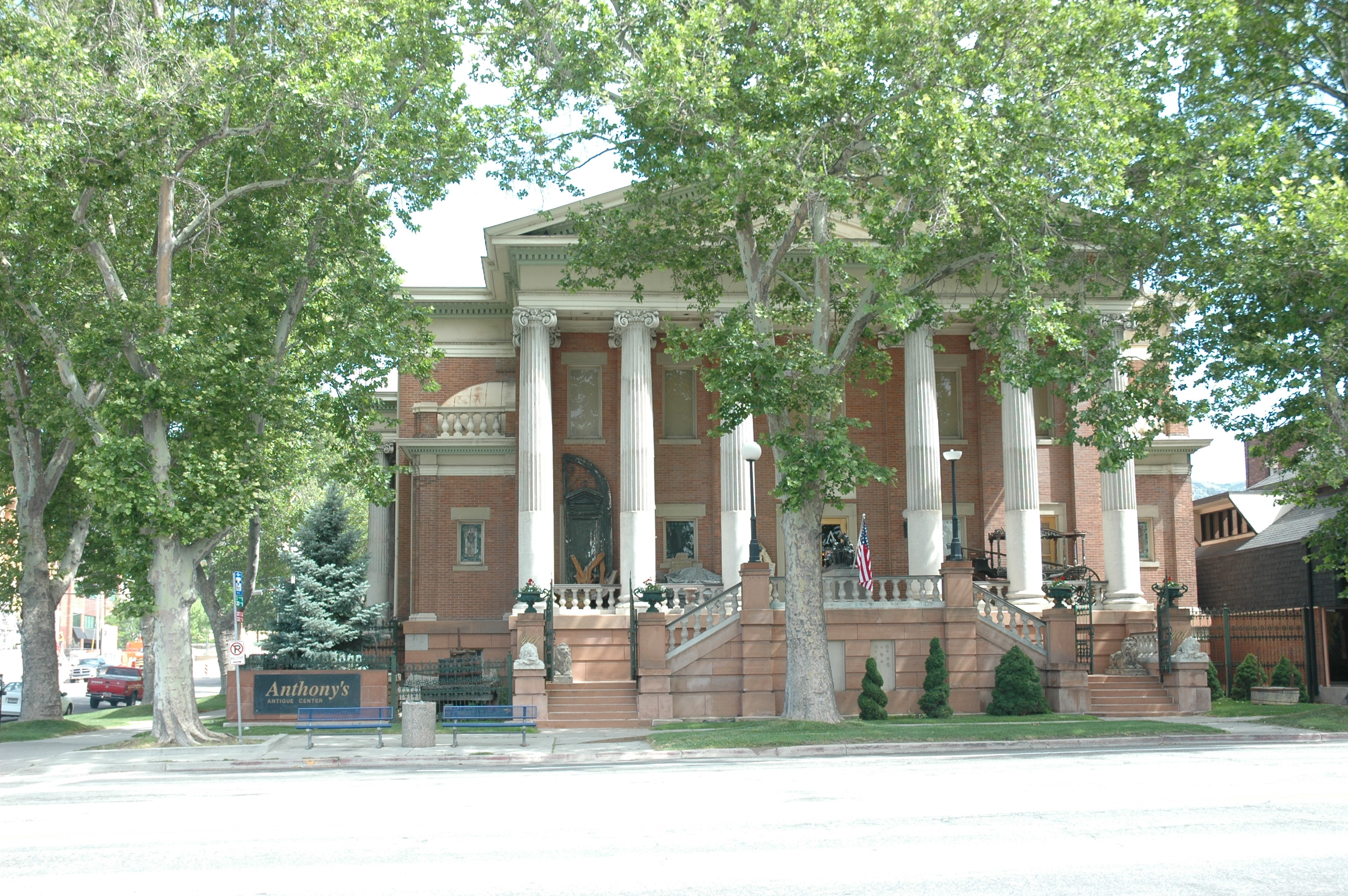
- The building now houses an antique store

- Location within Utah Location within the United States
- Location: 401 E. 200 South, Salt Lake City, Utah
- Coordinates: 40°45′55.2636″N 111°52′45.2382″W
- Area: less than one acre
- Built: 1910; 116 years ago
- Architect: Headlund, J.A.; Rundine, August
- Architectural style: Classical Revival
- NRHP reference No.: 78002668
- Added to NRHP: December 12, 1978

Immanuel Baptist Church is a historic church at 401 E. 200 South in Salt Lake City, Utah.

The Classical Revival church was built in 1910–1911, but not dedicated until 1915. It was added to the National Register of Historic Places in 1978.
