= Myanmar Institute of Theology =

Coordinates: 16°52′57.6″N 96°06′42″E

- Established: 1927; 99 years ago
- Affiliations: Myanmar Baptist Convention
- President: Naw Eh Tar Gay
- Faculty: 59 (full-time faculty in Theology & Liberal Arts Program)
- Location: Insein, Yangon, Yangon Division, Myanmar
- Campus: Seminary Hill
- Website: mit.edu.mm

Yangon City Landmark

Myanmar Institute of Theology (MIT) is a Baptist theological institute in Insein Township, Yangon, Myanmar (Burma). Judson Research Center, Peace Studies Center, and Gender Studies Center are parts of Myanmar Institute of Theology. It is affiliated with the Myanmar Baptist Convention.

== History ==
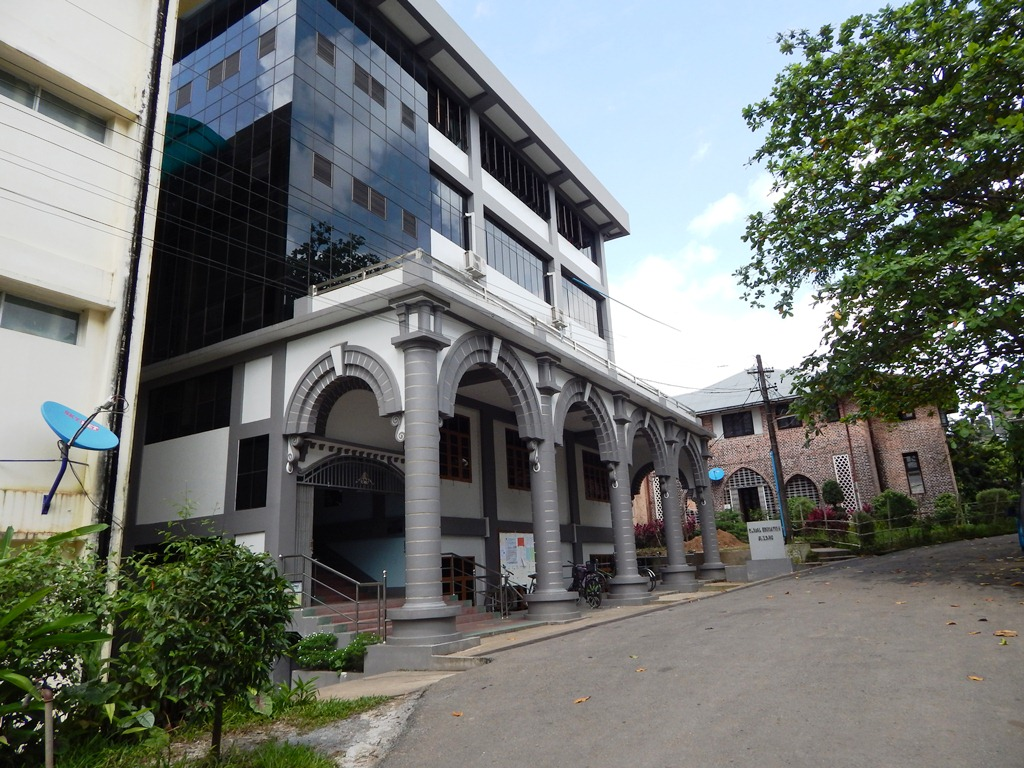
Myanmar Institute of Theology

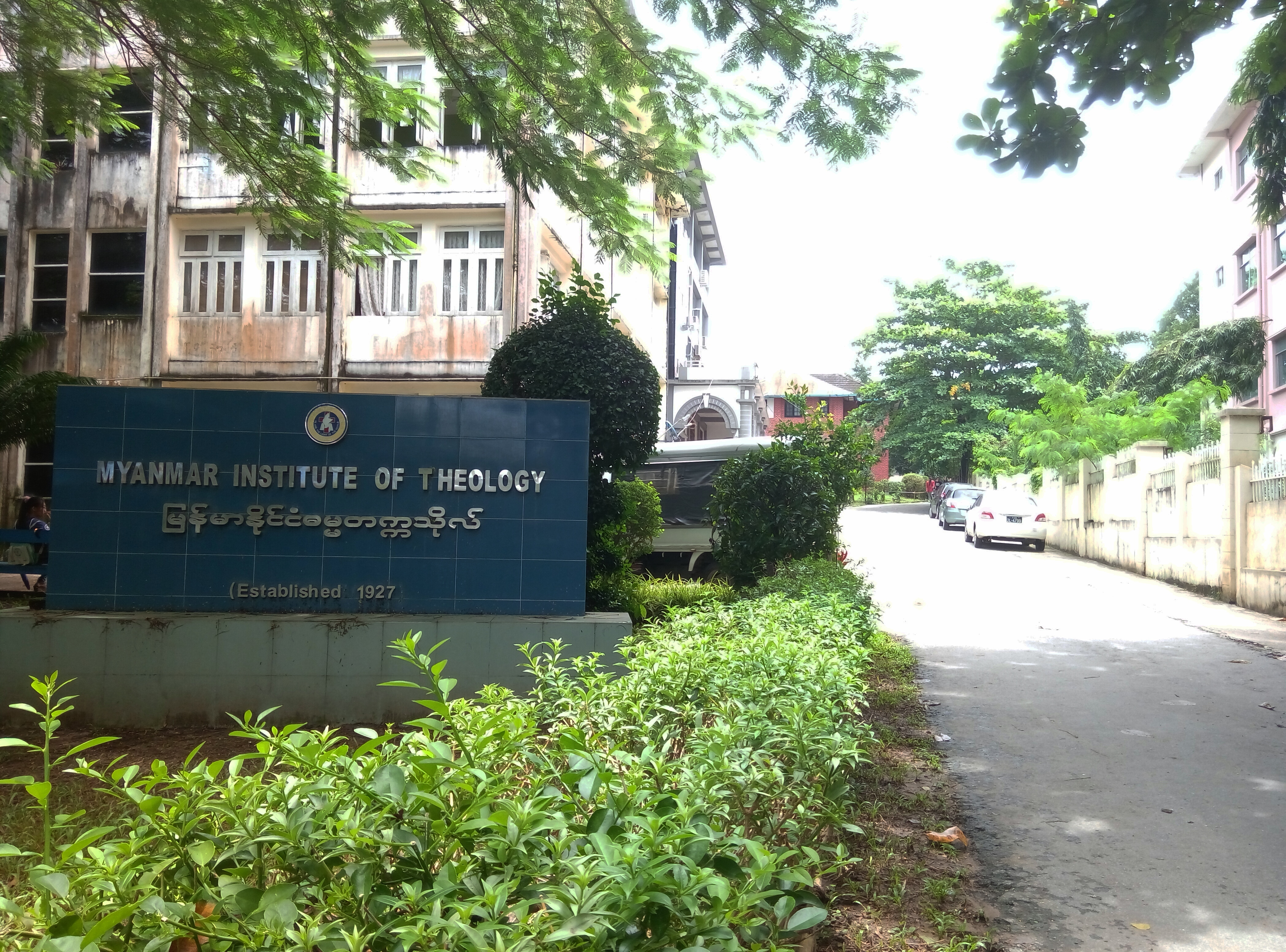
Myanmar Institute of Theology

The institute was originally founded as Baptist Divinity School, in June 1927, on Seminary Hill, Insein by the Myanmar Baptist Convention. Beginning with only four students, the school used the facilities of Karen Theological Seminary, currently known as Kayin Baptist Theological Seminary. Shortly after its opening the school became affiliated with Northern Baptist Theological Seminary in Chicago, Illinois. This affiliation lasted until the Second World War. The first president was W. E. Wiatt, an American missionary who served from 1927 to 1939. The school was renamed in 1939 as the Willis and Orlinda Pierce Divinity School (1939-1949). The second president of the school was C. F. Chaney who served from 1939 to 1941, when the Japanese occupied Burma.

In 1948, the school reopened with Thra Chit Maung as chairperson of the Curriculum Committee. In 1952, with the arrival of Paul D. Clasper, Maung was made president and Clasper, vice-president. The school was renamed in 1949 as the Burma Divinity School (1949-1976). In 1955, it became affiliated with Central Baptist Theological Seminary of Kansas City, Kansas. This affiliation lasted until 1960, when the school became an accredited member of the Association for Theological Education in South East Asia. Since 1960, the school has been conferring degrees on its graduates.

Since 1966, with the departure of American Baptist Missionary Union missionaries from Myanmar, the school has been entirely staffed by nationals.

In 1976, the name was again changed to Burma Institute of Theology (1976-1989). In 1977, on Maung’s retirement, Thramu Esther Lwin was made acting-president and then president from June 1978 to the end of 1983. In January 1984, Victor San Lone, who had been serving as general secretary of the Burma Baptist Convention, became president and served in that capacity until his sudden death in 1987. Thramu Eh Wah, the vice-president, was made acting-president until March 1988, when she was officially appointed President. The seminary’s name was changed to Myanmar Institute of Theology in 1989, when the country changed its name to Myanmar. Eh Wah retired in 1998. The then vice-principal Anna May Say Pa was elected the principal. Simon Pau Khan En succeeded in 2006, and when he retired in 2010, Samuel Ngun Ling became President of MIT (April 2010 - March 2023). Naw Eh Tar Gay serves as the 10th President of MIT.

Until 1962, only the ThB program was offered. That year the Bachelor of Religious Education program was introduced and in 1976, the BD program was initiated. In 1996, no new BTh applicants were accepted for the ThB program as the Board of Trustees had decided that the seminary would offer only graduate programs. In 1997, MIT started the MDiv, and MTS degree programs and replaced the BD program. March 1999 saw the last batch of BTh graduates and the first batch of MTS graduates. March 2000 marked the graduation of the first batch of the Master of Divinity class. Year 2000 is a milestone for launching new programs such as Summer School, Summer Seminar and Bachelor of Arts in Religious Studies (BARS).

In 2004, MIT launched the Doctor of Ministry (DMin) program in partnership with the Union Theological Seminary, Manila, the Philippines. The program ended in 2008 when MIT started a new partnership for Doctor of Ministry program with the Central Baptist Theological Seminary, Kansas, to take effect from 2010-2011 academic year.

Master of Ministry (MMin) degree program was inaugurated in 2006.

The year 2010 saw the opening of a new program called Master of Theological Librarianship (MTL) and the termination of the old program called Master of Theological Studies (MTS).

In 2014, MIT launched the PhD degree program in the commemoration of the 200th anniversary of the arrival of the American Baptist missionaries, Adoniram and Ann Judson in the soil of Myanmar.

== Programs ==
MIT offers the following programs of study:

- PhD (Doctor of Philosophy)
- DMin (Doctor of Ministry)
- MTh (Master of Theology: Full-time two-year program)
- MACS (Master of Arts in Christian Studies: Part-time three-year program)
- MDiv (Master of Divinity: Full-time three-year program)
- MTL (Master of Theological Librarianship: Full-time two-year program)
- Liberal Arts Program (BARS—Bachelor of Arts in Religious Studies: Full-time four-year program)
- DipCD and MACD (Two-year full-time programs)
- MAID (Master of Arts in Interfaith Dialogue)
- MAPS (Master of Arts in Peace Studies)
- MAGS (Master of Arts in Gender Studies)

== Accreditation ==
Myanmar Institute of Theology is accredited by the Association for Theological Education in South East Asia (ATESEA).

== See also ==
- Karen Baptist Theological Seminary
