= Central Seminary =

Baptist seminary in Overland Park, Kansas, US

Coordinates: 39.009°N 94.838°W

Central Baptist Theological Seminary
- Former name: Kansas City Baptist Theological Seminary
- Type: Private
- Established: 1901
- Affiliations: American Baptist Churches USA; Cooperative Baptist Fellowship
- President: Pamela Durso
- Academic staff: 16
- Students: 291
- Location: Overland Park, Kansas, United States
- Website: www.cbts.edu

Central Baptist Theological Seminary, also known as Central Seminary, is a seminary Overland Park, Kansas, affiliated with American Baptist Churches USA and the Cooperative Baptist Fellowship.

== History ==
It was founded in 1901 as the Kansas City Baptist Theological Seminary. The name was changed to Central Baptist Theological Seminary in 1941. It moved from Kansas City to Shawnee in 2006, and from Shawnee to Overland Park in 2024.

Central has been in partnership with Myanmar Institute of Theology since 2009 and with Calvin University in South Korea since 2020.

Molly Marshall was appointed president in 2005 and served until 2020. The current president is Pamela Durso.
