= Berkeley School of Theology =

Theological school in California, US

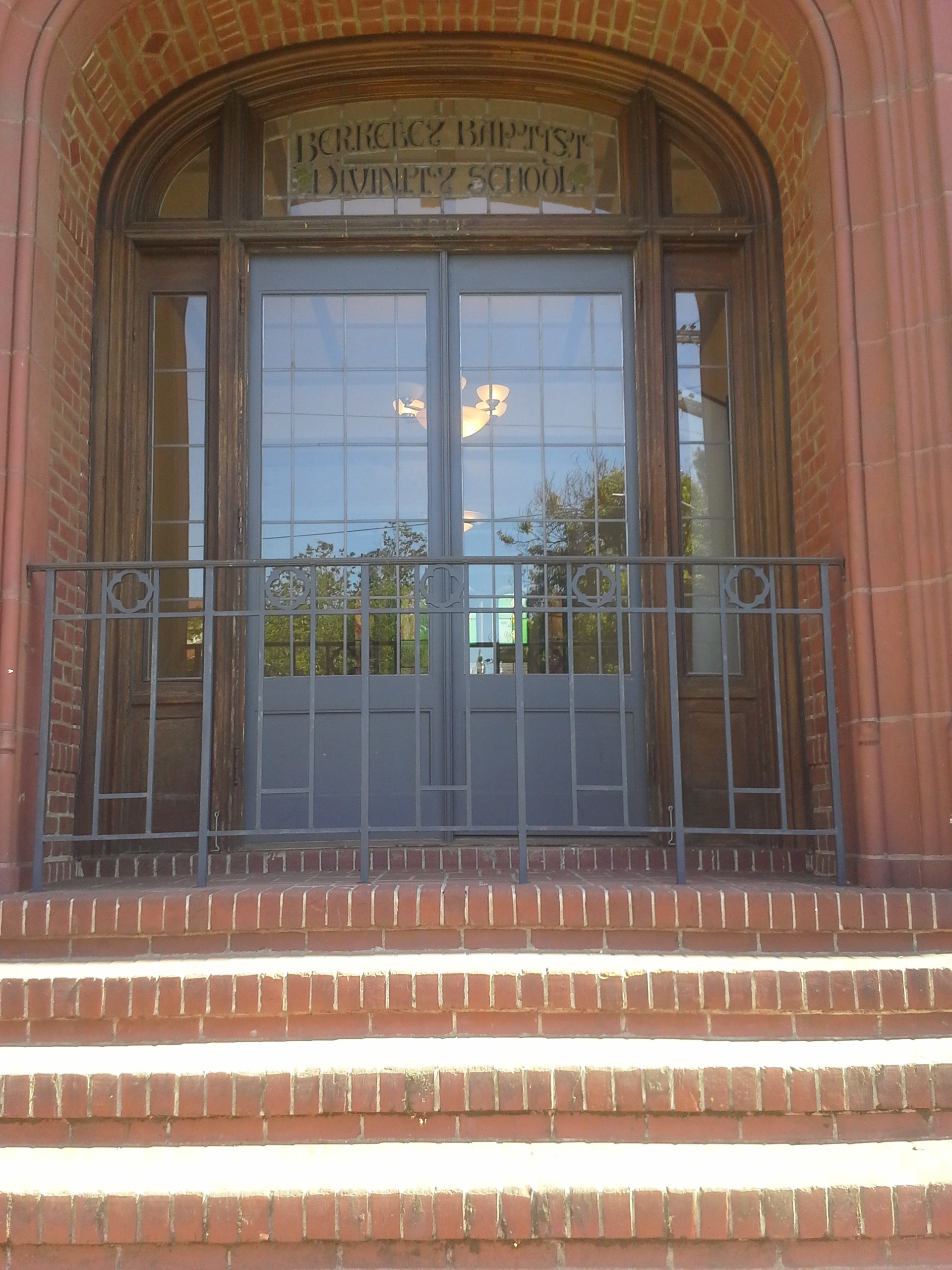
- Other name: Hobart Hall
- Former names: Berkeley Baptist Divinity School (1912–1968), American Baptist Seminary of the West (1968–2020)
- Type: Graduate Theological Seminary
- Established: 1871
- Religious affiliation: American Baptist Churches USA
- Academic affiliations: Graduate Theological Union; American Baptist Churches USA
- President: James Brenneman
- Dean: LeAnn Snow Flesher
- Academic staff: 12
- Students: 128
- Location: 2606 Dwight Way, Berkeley, California, United States; 37.865301°N 122.256160°W
- Campus: Urban
- Website: www.bst.edu

The Berkeley School of Theology (BST) is a Baptist theological institute in Berkeley, California, U.S.. It is affiliated with the American Baptist Churches USA. It is part of the Graduate Theological Union, a consortium of theological schools and centers in the Berkeley area.

== History ==
The earliest roots of Berkeley School of Theology lie in the chartering of California College, Vacaville, in 1871. In 1887, the college moved to Oakland, and in 1912 to Berkeley, at which time it changed its name to Berkeley Baptist Divinity School (BBDS), keeping this name until 1968. In 1915, BBDS merged with the Pacific Coast Baptist Theological Seminary, which had begun in Oakland in 1890 and had moved to Berkeley in 1904.

In 1919, the school building Hobart Hall at 2606 Dwight Way, Berkeley was designed by architect Julia Morgan. Hobart Hall is a Berkeley Landmark since September 8, 1998, and has a historical plaque.

In 1968, BBDS merged with California Baptist Theological Seminary (founded in 1944 in Los Angeles, and located in Covina since 1951). To reflect the fact that the school was no longer wholly in Berkeley, it was renamed the American Baptist Seminary of the West, but six years later the Covina faculty moved to the Berkeley campus, effecting considerable cost savings and at the same time availing themselves of the resources of the Graduate Theological Union. In July 2020, ABSW changed its name again to Berkeley School of Theology.

== Academics ==
BST offers a wide range of programs from specialized certificates, accredited Master of Divinity (M.Div.), Master of Community Leadership (MCL), a fully-online Master of Theological Studies (MTS) and Doctor of Ministry (D.Min.) degrees. Jointly with the Graduate Theological Union, BST offers an accredited Master of Arts (MA). BST also participates with the Graduate Theological Union in offering the Doctor of Philosophy (Ph.D.) degree.

== See also ==
- List of Berkeley landmarks
- List of works by Julia Morgan
