= International Ministries (organization) =

Baptist Christian missionary society

- Founded: 1814; 212 years ago
- Founders: Walter Gowans; Rowland Bingham; Thomas Kent
- Type: Non-profit
- Headquarters: King of Prussia, Pennsylvania, United States
- Location: 70 countries
- Fields: Christian Missionary Outreach
- Affiliations: American Baptist Churches USA
- Website: internationalministries.org

International Ministries is an international Baptist Christian missionary society. It is a constituent board affiliated with the American Baptist Churches USA. The headquarters is in King of Prussia, Pennsylvania, United States.

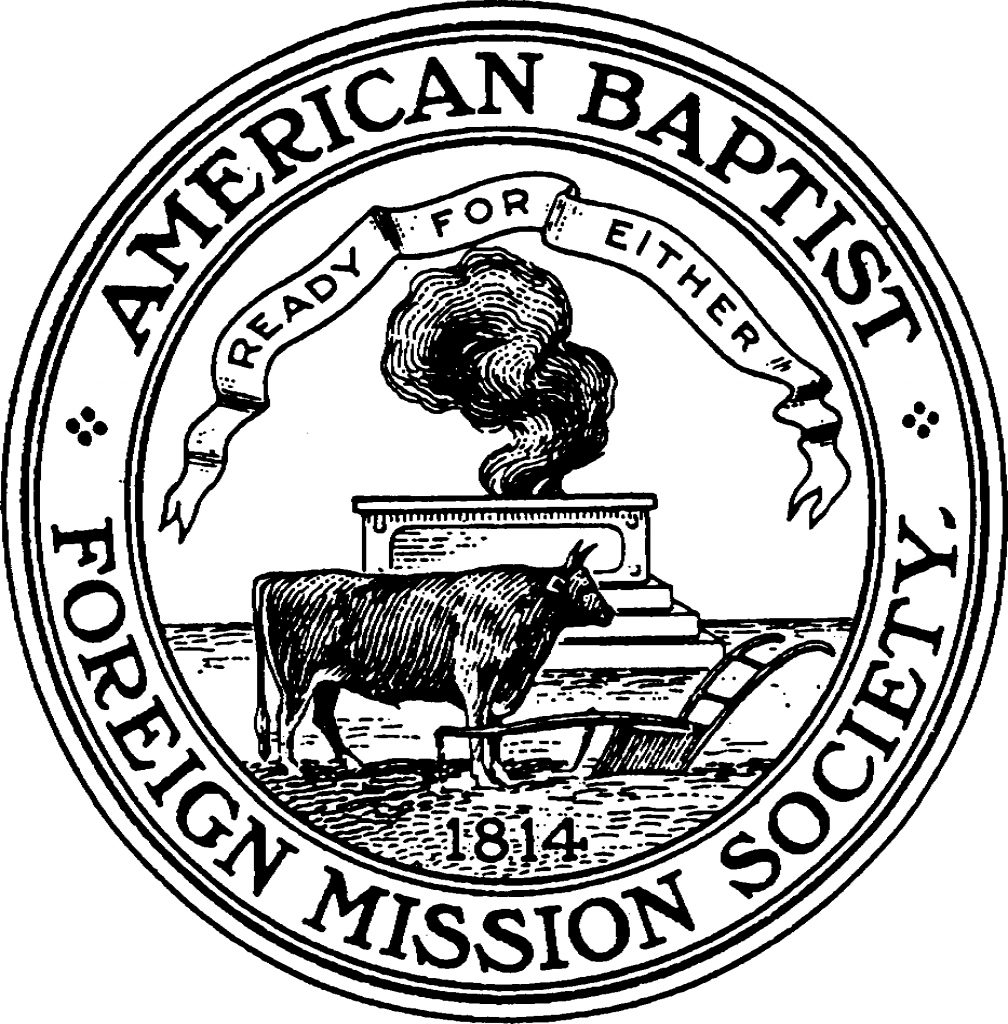
Seal of the American Baptist Foreign Mission Society (ABFMS), established under the Triennial Convention in 1814.

== History ==
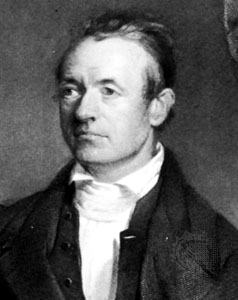
Adoniram Judson, co-founder of the Missionary Society

The society was founded in 1814 as the Baptist Board for Foreign Missions by the Triennial Convention (now American Baptist Churches USA). The first mission of the organization took place in Burma with the missionaries Adoniram Judson and Ann Hasseltine Judson in 1814. Other missions that followed took place in Siam in 1833, India in 1840, China in 1842, Japan in 1872 and Philippines in 1900. In the late 1800s, the society helped fund the Swedish Baptist conference's new seminary, Bethel Seminary, in Stockholm.

It was renamed American Baptist Missionary Union in 1845, American Baptist Foreign Mission Society in 1910, and American Board of International Ministries in 1973. In 2018, it had 1,800 volunteers in 70 countries.

== Controversies ==
In 1843, abolitionist Baptist pastors of Massachusetts met at Boston Tremont Temple and founded the American and Foreign Mission Society in opposition to slavery in the South. In 1844, the Baptist Board for Foreign Missions refused to approve a slaveowner proposed by the Georgia State Convention, Elder James E. Reeve as a missionary, recognizing the case as a challenge and not wanting to overturn their policy of neutrality in the slavery issue. They stated that slavery should not be introduced as a factor into deliberations about missionary appointments. This decision prompted the Alabama Baptist State Convention to challenge the Home Mission Board with what were called the "Alabama Resolutions", drafted by Rev. Basil Manly, Sr. They threatened to withdraw financial support from the national organization if their candidates were not considered for positions as missionaries, regardless of whether they were slaveholders.

In its response, the Board noted that they needed to maintain independence in their approval of missionary appointments. They further stated that in 30 years, no slaveholder had applied to be a missionary. They said missionaries traveled without servants, so no slaveholder could take slaves with him. Lastly, they said that they would "never be a party to any arrangement which would imply approbation of slavery." Dissatisfied with the decision, added to other sectional tensions, Baptists of nine Southern states split from the Triennial Convention and in 1845 formed the Southern Baptist Convention.

In 1872, the American and Foreign Mission Society merged with the American Baptist Missionary Union of the American Baptist Churches USA.

== Prominent American Baptist missionaries ==
- William Thomas Amiger, Liberia, 1919–1923
- George Boardman, Burma, 1801–1831
- Clinton Caldwell Boone, 1901–1910
- Lott Cary, Liberia, 1821–1828
- David Crockett Graham, Sichuan, China, 1911–1948
- Marilla Baker Ingalls (1828-1902), Burma 1851–1902
- John Taylor Jones, Thailand 1832–1851
- Adoniram Judson, Burma, 1813–1850
- Louis F. Knoll, India
- William M. Mitchell, Canada, fl. 1859
- Issachar Jacox Roberts, Macao and China, ca. 1837–1862
- Charlotte White, Digah, India, 1816–1826
- Edward Winter Clark, India

== See also ==
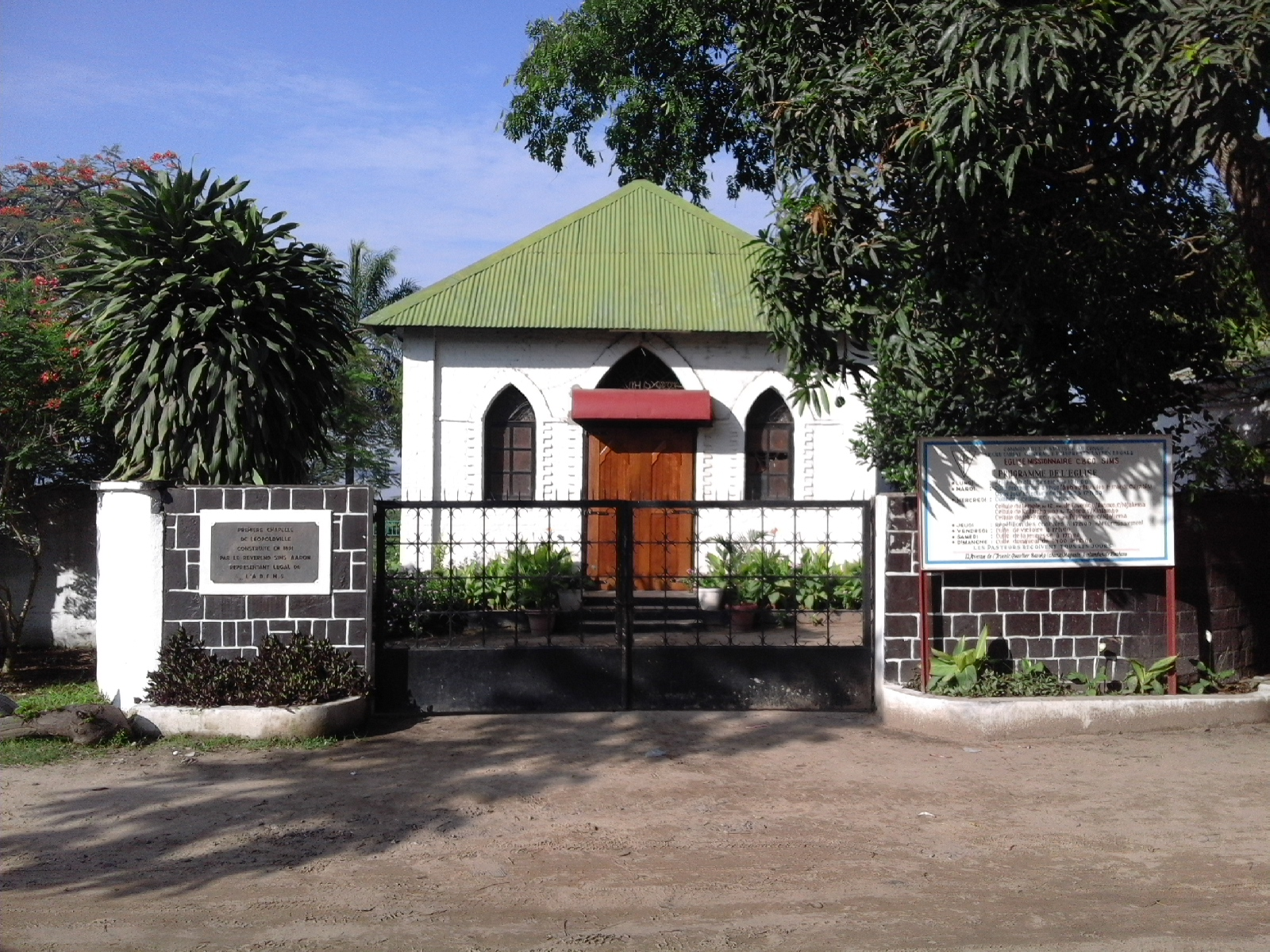
The first chapel in the proximity of Kintambo, now "avenue de l'Avenir", quartier Basoko, Ngaliema, founded 1891 by Sims Aaron, legal representative to ABFMS.

- 19th-century Protestant missions in China
- American Baptist Home Mission Society
- Baptist Christianity in Sichuan
- Central Philippine University (The first Baptist university in Asia established by William Orison Valentine)
- Christianity in China
- Convention of Philippine Baptist Churches
- Emmanuel Baptist Church (Yangon, Burma)
- List of Protestant missionaries in China
- Protestant missionary societies in China during the 19th Century
- Timeline of Chinese history
