= Hakha =

Capital of Chin State, Myanmar

Hakha Hakha khualipi (Laimi) Haka
- State Capital
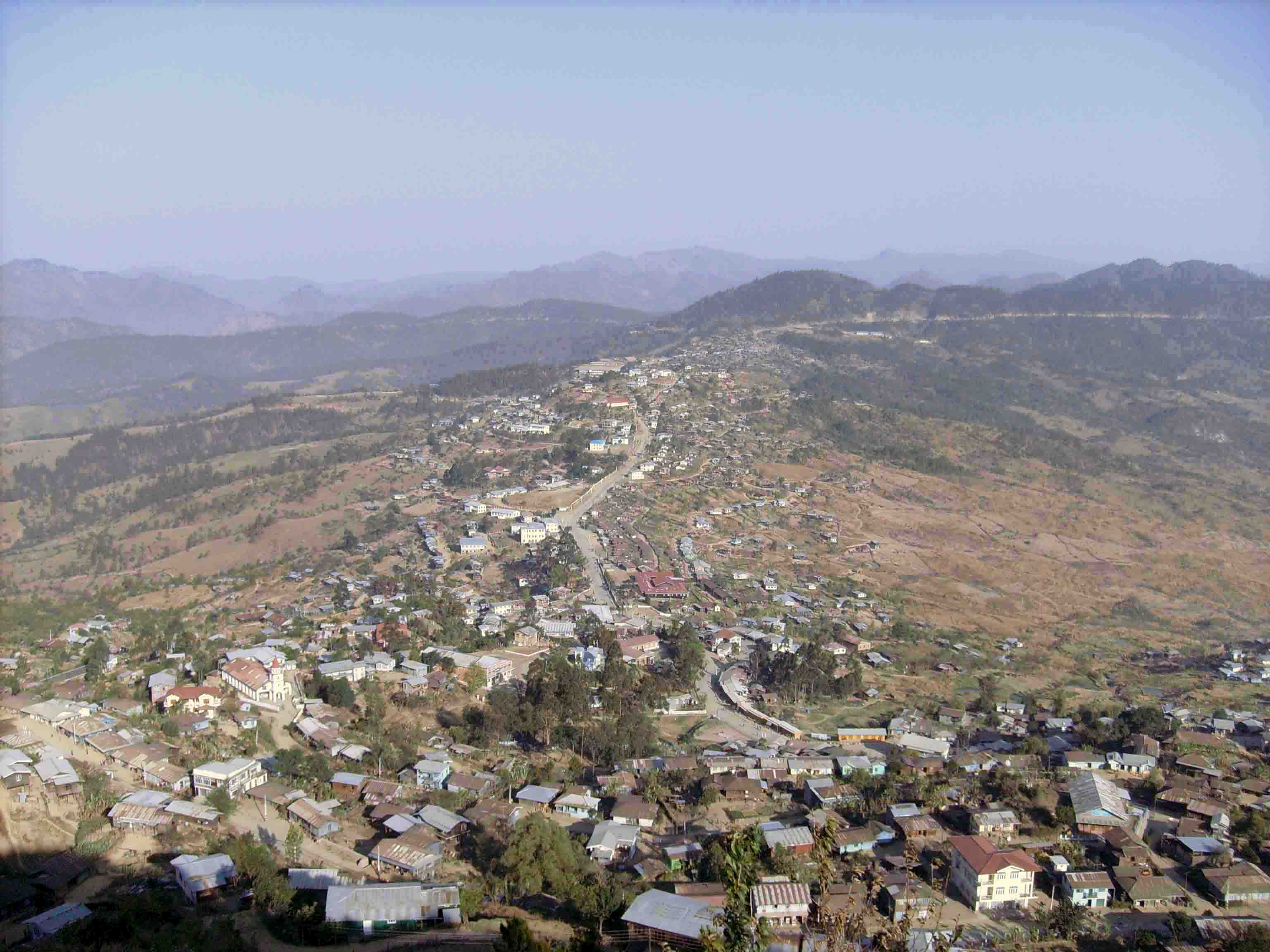
- Hakha

- Location in Burma
- Coordinates: 22°38′43.9476″N 93°36′18.129″E
- Country: Myanmar
- State: Chin
- District: Hakha District
- Township: Hakha Township

Government
  - Mayor: U Aung Kyaw Htay (USDP)

Area
  - Total: 12.50 sq mi (32.4 km^{2})
- Elevation: 6,125 ft (1,867 m)

Population (2014)
  - Total: 24,926
  - Density: 1,994/sq mi (769.9/km^{2})
  - Ethnicities: Chin; Laimi
- Time zone: UTC+6:30 (MST)

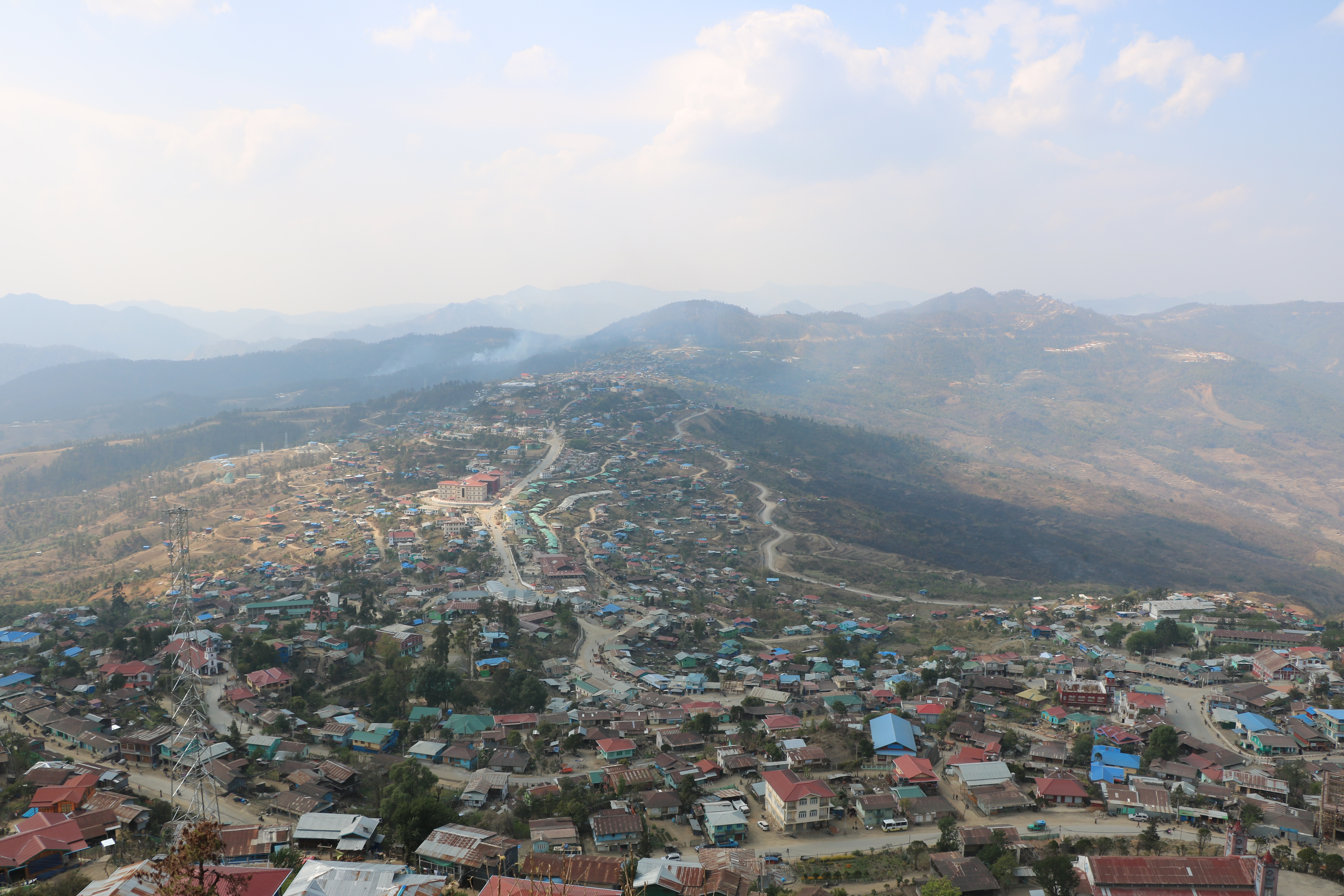

Hakha (Note: Burmese: ဟားခါးမြို့, MLCTS: ha: hka: mrui., pronounced [hákʰá mjo̰]; formerly rendered Haka; Hakha Chin: Halkha) is the capital of Chin State in Myanmar (Burma). The city is located on a plateau at more than 1,867 metres (6,125 ft) above sea level within Hakha Township. It is the largest urban area of Chin State. As of the 2014 census, the city had a population of 24,926 across its six wards.

== History ==
Hakha was founded around 1400 CE by the Lai ethnic group. The area was ruled by local chiefs for many generations and consisted of more than 600 houses when British troops arrived in 1889.

The British occupied Hakha beginning on 19 January 1890, as part of their operation to "subdue the wild tribes" in the Arakan Hills Division, as the area was then called. The British government later established a sub-divisional office and Hakha became incorporated as a town a few years later.

The first American Baptist missionary couple, Arthur Carson (1860–1908) and his wife Laura (1858–1942), arrived in Hakha in 1899 and opened a mission station. Other missionaries later joined them and did extensive mission work throughout the Chin Hills, converting most of northern Chin State to Christianity within a century. On 1 May 1928, Rev. Chester Strait established a Bible school in Hakha.

During the Second World War, Hakha was captured by Japanese troops on 11 November 1943; it was later recaptured by British troops.

When Burma gained independence from British control in 1948, Hakha became an important city as the center of one of the subdivisions in the Chin Special Division, of which Falam was the capital at that time. The Chin Special Division was abolished and reformed as Chin State in 1974, at which time Hakha became its capital. That brought an influx of government workers, and housing development and extension of the city. Hakha eventually became the largest city in Chin State with about 20,000 people. Hakha became part of the newly formed Hakha District on 1 June 2012.

== Geography and climate ==
The city is located 6,120 feet (1,870 m) above sea level and lies at the foot of Rung Tlang (Mt. Rung), which is about 7,543 feet (2,299 m) high, one of the most famous mountain peaks in Chin State.

Hakha features a subtropical highland climate (Cwb) under the Köppen climate classification. It experiences three seasons: cool, warm, and rainy. Because of the high altitude, the temperatures tend to be much cooler than in the plains. Yearly rainfall averages about 72 inches or 1,800 millimetres.

During the cool season, the days are pleasant to warm but the mornings are quite cold. Sometimes, the temperature drops to as low as −2 °C or 28.4 °F. It is also windy and foggy in this season. In January 2009, a cold wave caused temperatures to drop to 0 °C or 32 °F.

Climate data for Hakha (1991–2020)
| Month | Jan | Feb | Mar | Apr | May | Jun | Jul | Aug | Sep | Oct | Nov | Dec | Year |
|---|---|---|---|---|---|---|---|---|---|---|---|---|---|
| Record high °C (°F) | 24.9 (76.8) | 26.4 (79.5) | 29.5 (85.1) | 32.5 (90.5) | 30.6 (87.1) | 30.0 (86.0) | 30.0 (86.0) | 28.0 (82.4) | 26.6 (79.9) | 27.0 (80.6) | 26.2 (79.2) | 24.7 (76.5) | 32.5 (90.5) |
| Mean daily maximum °C (°F) | 18.7 (65.7) | 20.6 (69.1) | 23.2 (73.8) | 25.0 (77.0) | 24.4 (75.9) | 23.2 (73.8) | 22.4 (72.3) | 22.1 (71.8) | 22.2 (72.0) | 21.5 (70.7) | 19.8 (67.6) | 18.5 (65.3) | 21.8 (71.2) |
| Daily mean °C (°F) | 10.5 (50.9) | 12.5 (54.5) | 15.7 (60.3) | 18.1 (64.6) | 19.0 (66.2) | 19.4 (66.9) | 19.2 (66.6) | 18.9 (66.0) | 18.6 (65.5) | 17.0 (62.6) | 13.4 (56.1) | 10.6 (51.1) | 16.1 (61.0) |
| Mean daily minimum °C (°F) | 2.2 (36.0) | 4.5 (40.1) | 8.3 (46.9) | 11.2 (52.2) | 13.6 (56.5) | 15.7 (60.3) | 16.0 (60.8) | 15.8 (60.4) | 15.0 (59.0) | 12.5 (54.5) | 7.0 (44.6) | 2.7 (36.9) | 10.4 (50.7) |
| Record low °C (°F) | −6.0 (21.2) | −5.0 (23.0) | −1.0 (30.2) | 4.6 (40.3) | 6.4 (43.5) | 10.0 (50.0) | 10.4 (50.7) | 10.7 (51.3) | 9.0 (48.2) | 3.5 (38.3) | −3.8 (25.2) | −4.8 (23.4) | −6.0 (21.2) |
| Average precipitation mm (inches) | 12.1 (0.48) | 11.1 (0.44) | 27.2 (1.07) | 66.0 (2.60) | 186.9 (7.36) | 261.5 (10.30) | 335.2 (13.20) | 351.6 (13.84) | 317.1 (12.48) | 205.3 (8.08) | 37.6 (1.48) | 14.2 (0.56) | 1,825.7 (71.88) |
| Average precipitation days (≥ 1.0 mm) | 1.0 | 1.8 | 3.0 | 6.8 | 13.5 | 20.3 | 23.7 | 23.3 | 20.7 | 15.8 | 4.4 | 1.1 | 135.4 |
Source 1: World Meteorological Organization
Source 2: Norwegian Meteorological Institute (extremes), NOAA (extremes)

== Culture ==
=== Religion ===
Most Chin people living in Hakha are Christians; therefore, they do not work on Sundays.

== Important sites ==
- Chin State Cultural Museum
- Rev. Van Hre Villa (Chin Traditional House)
- Missionaries' Cemetery
- East Bungalow
- Hakha Baptist Church

== Education ==
- Hakha University
- Hakha Educational College
- Chin Christian University
- Government Technical Institute, Hakha

== Sport ==
The 4,000-seat Wanthu Maung Stadium, a home stadium for Chin United F.C, was under construction as of 2017.

The UFC Flyweight Champion Joshua Van was born in Hakha and lived there until the age of 10.
