= Pe Thein Zar =

Burmese opposition leader (1943–2018)

Pe Thein Zar နာဲဖေသိင်ဇြာ
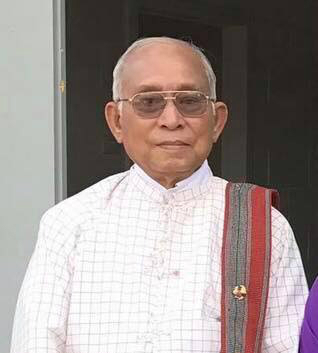
- Born: Pe Thein; February 19, 1942; Kamawet, Mudon Township, Mon State, British Burma
- Died: July 30, 2018 (aged 76); Canberra, Australia
- Education: Rangoon University (BA)
- Spouse: Nyo Nyo Win
- Parent(s): Nai Maung Maung, Mi Chit Tin

Pe Thein Zar (8 January 1943 – 30 July 2018) was an ethnic Mon opposition leader in Myanmar (Burma) who was imprisoned for seven years for his activism. He was a lawyer by profession and a prolific writer after his retirement.

== Early life ==
Pe Thein Zar was born in Kamawet Village (town), Mudon Township, in Mon State, Burma on 8 January 1943. He attended No. 1 Moulmein (now Mawlamyaing) State High School for his secondary education and was a member of the Moulmein District Mon Student Union. He is married to Nyo Nyo Win.

== Student life and political activity ==
Pe Thein Zar graduated in 1960. For further study he went to Moulmein College in 1961, and became an executive member of the Moulmein College Mon Students’ Association and an executive member of the Moulmein College Students’ Union.

In late 1961, he was again elected as the President of the Moulmein District Mon Students’ Association, and attended, along with other student leaders, Conference of All Burma Students Union (ABSU) which was held in the Student Union Building of Rangoon (now Yangon) University on 16 November 1961. That was the last of the ABSU's conference to be held in this building before it was dynamited by General Ne Win on 8 July 1962. In 1962 he became the General Secretary of the Moulmein College Mon Students’ Association.

In 1963, while studying for the BSc degree, he was elected as the President of the Students’ United Front of Moulmein Degree College, the strongest student organisation in the College. On 14 November 1963, when peace negotiations between the Revolutionary Council, led by General Ne Win, and the leaders of various armed resistance groups collapsed, student organisations from all over the country staged demonstrations to urge the Revolutionary Council to resume the peace talks as soon as possible.

On 18 November 1963, he and other student leaders of the Moulmein Degree College decided to occupy the College as part of their attempt to force the Revolutionary Council to continue the negotiation process. On the night of 2 December 1963, he was, together with other student leaders, arrested and imprisoned in the Moulmein Jail. While there he met Mon leaders, Nai Tun Thein, Nai Chan Mon, Nai Nonlar, Nai Kyaung, Nai Kon Balai and Nai Tin Aung, all of whom had been detained on 14 November 1963. After seven years of detention, he was released on 15 October 1970, but he was unable to resume his BSc degree course at Moulmein Degree College. He was told that the course was part of the old educational system that was no longer in place, and that to get a degree, he had to start again from the first year.

In 1973, after passing the Higher Grade Pleader (HGP) Examination, he started practising as a lawyer in Moulmein from 1975. At the same time, he undertook a correspondent course at the Rangoon University where in 1979 he received his BA (History) degree.

In 1987, the Burmese Socialist Programme Party (BSPP) government unexpectedly announced the demonetization of the 100-Kyat-note for the third time an thousands of people lost all their savings, some of whom committed suicide. He left home and joined one of the armed resistance groups to fight against the military junta.

On 15 October 1987, Nai Tin Aung, Nai Aung Shein and he, along with 25 Mon students from the Moulmein University and high schools, went underground and joined the New Mon State Party (NMSP). Not very long after that he was elected as a member of the central committee of the NMSP. In the Thai-Burma areas, for the first time in his life, he heard unfamiliar terms such as ‘human rights’, ‘humanitarian aid’, ‘NGO’, ‘freedom of expression’, ‘freedom of the press’, and ‘freedom of assembly’, etc. ‘Free and fair election’ and ‘government accountabilities’ were also foreign terms to them.

In January 1990, as a representative of the NMSP, he took up duties at the National Democratic Front (NDF) office at Mannerplaw, located in the headquarters building of the Karen National Union (KNU). In that year, the State Law and Order Restoration Council (SLORC) organised a free and fair general election. As had been expected, the National League for Democracy (NLD), led by Aung San Suu Kyi, won a landslide victory. The SLORC refused to transfer the power to the NLD and many elected members of the parliament went underground to join up with various armed resistance groups. Some arrived at NMSP and some at KNU areas. On 18 December 1990, with the support of the NMSP, the KNU, the Kachin Independence Organisation (KIO) and other ethnic groups, the National Coalition Government of the Union of Burma (NCGUB), led by Dr. Sein Win, a cousin of Aung San Suu Kyi, was established at Mannerplaw.

In 1992, the National Council of the Union of Burma (NCUB) was founded by representatives of the NDF, NCGUB, and the Democratic Alliance of Burma (DAB). He was a member of the NCUB. When the Burma Lawyers’ Council (BLC) was formed in Mannerplaw, he became a member of it as well. At the Third Congress of the NDF that was held at Mannerplaw in 1992, he was elected as a committee member responsible for foreign affairs, while Nai Shwe Kyin (the President of NMSP) was elected as its President. Also in 1992, when the NDF decided to establish the Federal University, in order to provide education for those students who were involved in the 1988 pro-democracy uprising and who had fled to the armed resistance group areas, he was assigned to take charge of that university. In February 1993, he attended a diplomacy training course, organised by Jose Ramos Hota who was later to become the second president of East Timor), at the University of New South Wales.

In October 1993, under a programme of the UN International Indigenous Year, he led a delegation of NDF representatives to several European countries, to draw attention to the plight of the ethnic minorities of Burma under the Burmese military regime – to the gross human rights abuses, forced labour, rapes, murder and arbitrary arrests committed by the Burmese armed forces in the ethnic minority areas. In November 1993, he attended a UN Human Rights Commission seminar in Geneva, Switzerland where he met many representatives from various countries around the world.

== Resettlement in Australia ==
In protest against the ceasefire agreement reached between the NMSP and the SLORC on 29 June 1995, he resigned from the party, went to Bangkok with his wife, Nyo Nyo Win, and applied for refugee status at the UNHCR office. About five months later, both were recognised as persons-of-concern, that is, refugees, by the UNHCR. After staying at the Maneeloi Refugee Camp in Thailand for about six months, on 26 November 1996, they migrated to Australia.

== Writer ==
After his retirement he wrote books on Mon politics and history in Burmese or English. He had written six books and was completing a seventh when died.
