= National Coalition Government of the Union of Burma =

Government in exile which existed from 1990 to 2012

National Coalition Government of the Union of Burma ပြည်ထောင်စုမြန်မာနိုင်ငံ အမျိုးသားညွန့်ပေါင်းအစိုးရ
- 1990–2012
- Flag Coat of arms
- Anthem: Kaba Ma Kyei
- Status: Government in exile
- Capital: Yangon
- Capital-in-exile: Rockville, Maryland, United States
- Common languages: Burmese
- Government: Coalition government
- Prime Minister
  - 1990–2012: Sein Win
- Legislature: National Council
- History
  - Established: 18 December 1990
  - Disestablished: 14 September 2012
Preceded by	Succeeded by
Socialist Republic of the Union of Burma	Myanmar

The National Coalition Government of the Union of Burma (Burmese: ပြည်ထောင်စုမြန်မာနိုင်ငံ အမျိုးသားညွန့်ပေါင်းအစိုးရ [pjìdàʊɰ̃zṵ mjəmà nàɪɰ̃ŋàɰ̃ əmjóðá ɲʊ̰ɰ̃báʊɰ̃ əsója̰]; NCGUB) was an administration which claimed to be the government in exile of Burma (Myanmar). It had its headquarters in Rockville, Maryland, United States. It was formally established in December 1990, with Sein Win as its first prime minister. It was dissolved in September 2012.

== History ==
On 18 December 1990, in Manerplaw, the National League for Democracy (NLD) and the other opposition parties of Burma established the National Coalition Government of the Union of Burma, and elected Sein Win, a first cousin of Aung San Suu Kyi, as its prime minister.

A newer version, the Democratic Government of Burma, replaced the original structure in Bommersvik, Sweden at a special convention held there from 16 to 23 July 1995. In a press release, embargoed until 27 July 1995, the Elected Representatives of Burma issued the following communiqué:

Following the release of Burmese democracy leader and 1991 Nobel Peace laureate Daw Aung San Suu Kyi on 10 July 1995, the National Coalition Government of the Union of Burma (NCGUB) led by Prime Minister Dr. Sein Win, convened the first ever Convention of Elected Representatives from the liberated areas of Burma in Bommersvik, Sweden, from 16–23 July 1995. The representatives of the people of Burma elected in the 27 May 1990 general elections, met to discuss the drastically changed political situation in Burma and to re-organize the NCGUB into a more effective force to support Daw Aung San Suu Kyi's political initiatives in Rangoon. The Convention supported Daw Aung San Suu Kyi's call for a genuine political dialogue and called on the Secretary-General of the United Nations to implement the UN General Assembly resolution which called for him to assist in the national reconciliation process in Burma. A tripartite dialogue between the Burmese military led by SLORC; the democracy movement led by Daw Aung San Suu Kyi; and Burma's ethnic leaders; was endorsed by the elected representatives. The Convention welcomed the release of Daw Aung San Suu Kyi and thanked all who worked for her release. Daw Aung San Suu Kyi's return to politics and her determination to continue working for democracy in Burma was applauded and welcomed. The leading role played by SLORC Chairman Senior General Than Shwe in Daw Aung San Suu Kyi's release was also recognized. To give the leadership more flexibility to deal with the rapidly changing situation, the government formed by elected representatives in Manerplaw on 18 December 1990 was officially dissolved by the Convention of Elected Representatives on 21 July 1995 in Bommersvik. The Convention unanimously re-elected Dr. Sein Win by secret ballot to head the new government. The new government re-affirmed its commitment to the establishment of a multiparty parliamentary democracy within the framework of a genuine federal union. The broad-based support of the new coalition government is reflected in the make up of the cabinet. The elected representatives were joined in their deliberations by representatives from the National Council of the Union of Burma, leaders of the National League for Democracy (Liberated Area), the United Nationalities League for Democracy, the All Burma Students Democratic Front, the Federation of Trade Unions of Burma, and NCGUB representatives. The Convention was hosted by the Stockholm-based Olof Palme International Centre and the Norwegian Burma Council in Bommersvik, the training centre of the Social Democratic Youth of Sweden.

— The Democratic Government of Burma

On 14 September 2012, NCGUB was officially dissolved to aid the reform process in Burma.

== Government structure ==
=== Cabinet ===
Office held	Cabinet member name	Party
Prime Minister	Dr. Sein Win	Party for National Democracy
Foreign Affairs	Dr. Sein Win	Party for National Democracy
Finance	U Bo Hla Tint	NLD
Prime Minister's Office	Teddy Buri	NLD
Information	U Maung Maung Aye	NLD
Federal Affairs	Khun Marko Ban	Democratic Organization for Kayan National Unity
Justice	U Thein Oo	NLD
Health & Education	Dr. Sann Aung	Independent
Prime Minister's Office	Dr. Tint Swe	NLD
Social Welfare & Development	Dr. Za Hlei Thang	CNLD
Labor Minister	U Thar Noe	ALD

=== Chairmen ===
N	Portrait	Name	Term of office		
N	Portrait	Name	Took office	Left office	Time in office
1		Sein Win	4 July 1990	7 October 2000	10 years, 95 days
2		Tint Swe	2000	12 August 2001	1 year, 223 days
3		Teddy Buri	12 August 2001	18 September 2001	37 days
(1)		Sein Win	18 September 2001	18 September 2012	11 years, 0 days

== State representation ==
=== Electoral constituencies ===
Elected representative	State Elected
Teddy Buri	Karenni State
Khun Marko Ban	Shan State
Dr. Za Hlei Thang	Chin State
Tha Noe	Arakan State

== Politics and actions ==
=== The Bommersvik Declarations ===
Subsequent to the 1995 convention the Elected Representatives of the Union of Burma returned to Bommersvik in 2002. The following two landmark declarations were the product of their deliberations.

==== Bommersvik Declaration I ====
In 1995, during the first convention that lasted from 16 to 23 July, the Representatives issued the Bommersvik Declaration I with the following preamble:

We, the representatives of the people of Burma, elected in the 27 May 1990 general elections, meeting at the First Convention of Elected Representatives from the liberated areas of Burma, hereby - Warmly welcome the unconditional release of 1991 Nobel Peace laureate Daw Aung San Suu Kyi on 10 July 1995; Thank all who have worked tirelessly and consistently for the release of Daw Aung San Suu Kyi and the cause of democracy in Burma; Applaud Daw Aung San Suu Kyi's determination, in spite of having spent 6 years under house arrest, to continue to work to bring true democracy to Burma; Welcome Daw Aung San Suu Kyi's return to politics to take up the mantle of her father, General Aung San, in Burma's second struggle for independence;...

— The Elected Representatives of the Union of Burma

==== Bommersvik Declaration II ====
In 2002, during the second convention that lasted from 25 February to 1 March, the Representatives issued the Bommersvik Declaration II with the following introductory passage:

We, the representatives of the people of Burma, elected in the 27 May 1990 general elections presently serving as members of the National Coalition Government of the Union of Burma and/or the Members of Parliament Union, meeting at the Convention of Elected Representatives held in Bommersvik for the second time, hereby reaffirm - Our Mandate, Position, and Strategic Objectives - that we will never ignore the will of the Burmese people expressed through the May 1990 general elections; - that the military’s refusal to honor the election results does not in any way diminish the validity of these results.....

— The Elected Representatives of the Union of Burma

== Proposed constitution ==
The NCGUB Proposed First Draft Constitution was published by the National Council of the Union of Burma (NCUB) in December 1997 with the following preamble:

We, the people of the Union of Burma have clear aspirations on the establishment of basic human rights, the guaranteeing of democratic rights and the rights of all the ethnic nationalities, lasting peace, and in the formation of a union of multiple States that will generate prosperity and unity . We aspire to establish a representative government in accordance with a constitution which defends, protects and upholds the rights of all people, based on freedom, equality before the law, fairness, peace, and the rule of law. Based on these aspirations, we steadfastly resolve to live together in peace and harmony in this free and fully sovereign Federal Union of Burma, and we accept and adopt this Constitution as the highest law of the Federal Union.

— NCGUB

== Delist as terrorist group ==
On 8 June 2018, NCGUB was officially delisted as a terrorist group and unlawful association, along with its members by Ministry of Home Affairs.
