= Sui Khar =

Foreign Minister of Chinland

Foreign Minister of the State of Chinland
- Incumbent
- Assumed office 1 February 2024
- Preceded by: Established

Personal details
- Born: ~1962 Chin state

Sui Khar (also known as Dr. Sui or Papa Sui) is a prominent Chin scholar, revolutionist, and ethnic rights advocate. He presently serves as foreign minister of the newly formed Chin State Government, having been nominated by the Chinland Council on 1 February 2024 and as Vice-chairman 2 of the Chin National Front (CNF).

== Life ==
Born in Thantlang Chin State, Burma, Dr. Sui attended a medical school that was interrupted by a nationwide student uprising in 1988. As a student activist, he co-founded the Chin National Front, a Chin ethnic armed group on the Indo-Burma border, to oppose Myanmar's ruthless repression of student uprisings.

In 1995 and 1997, he was reported as the 'Secretary of Foreign Affairs of the CNF' and represented it at the National Council of the Union of Burma. In 2007, he was serving as the Chair of the Foreign Affairs Committee of the Ethnic Nationalities Council (ENC) and by 2012, he was serving as its General Secretary. In 2015, he was Secretary General II of the CNF. Between 2016 and 2018, he was serving as the Secretary of the Joint Ceasefire Monitoring Committee – Union Level (JMC-U) under the United Nations and as the Assistant General Secretary 1 of the CNF.

While involved in the armed struggle, Dr. Sui was active in the ethnic and indigenous rights movement not only in Myanmar but across Asia. In 2008, Dr. Sui co-wrote an article on Burma for the IWGIA. From 2008 until 2016, Dr. Sui chaired the Asia Indigenous Peoples Pact (AIPP), a group of 47 groups from 14 Asian countries. He played an important part in the establishment of the Myanmar Indigenous Peoples Network in 2013. He also served as a board member of numerous local human rights organizations.

Dr. Sui now serves as Vice-chairman 2 of the Chin National Front (CNF) and since appointment by the Chinland Council on 1 February 2024 as the Foreign Minister of the State of Chinland. In an interview with the Diplomat, Dr. Sui assesses that the Burmese Army could be defeated in the Myanmar civil war within three years. He also asserts that China's factor hinders the implementation of the BURMA Act passed by the US Senate in 2023. He also supports cooperation with the National Unity Government, a parallel government established by other insurgent groups, the National League for Democracy and other parties.
