= Great Synagogue of Vilna =

Former Orthodox synagogue in Vilnius, Lithuania

Great Synagogue
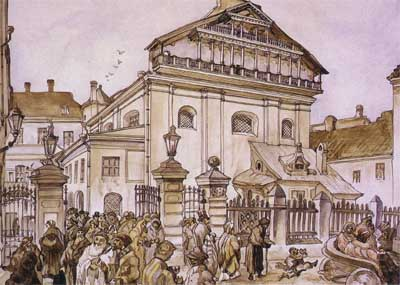
- Watercolor by Juozas Kamarauskas, 1899

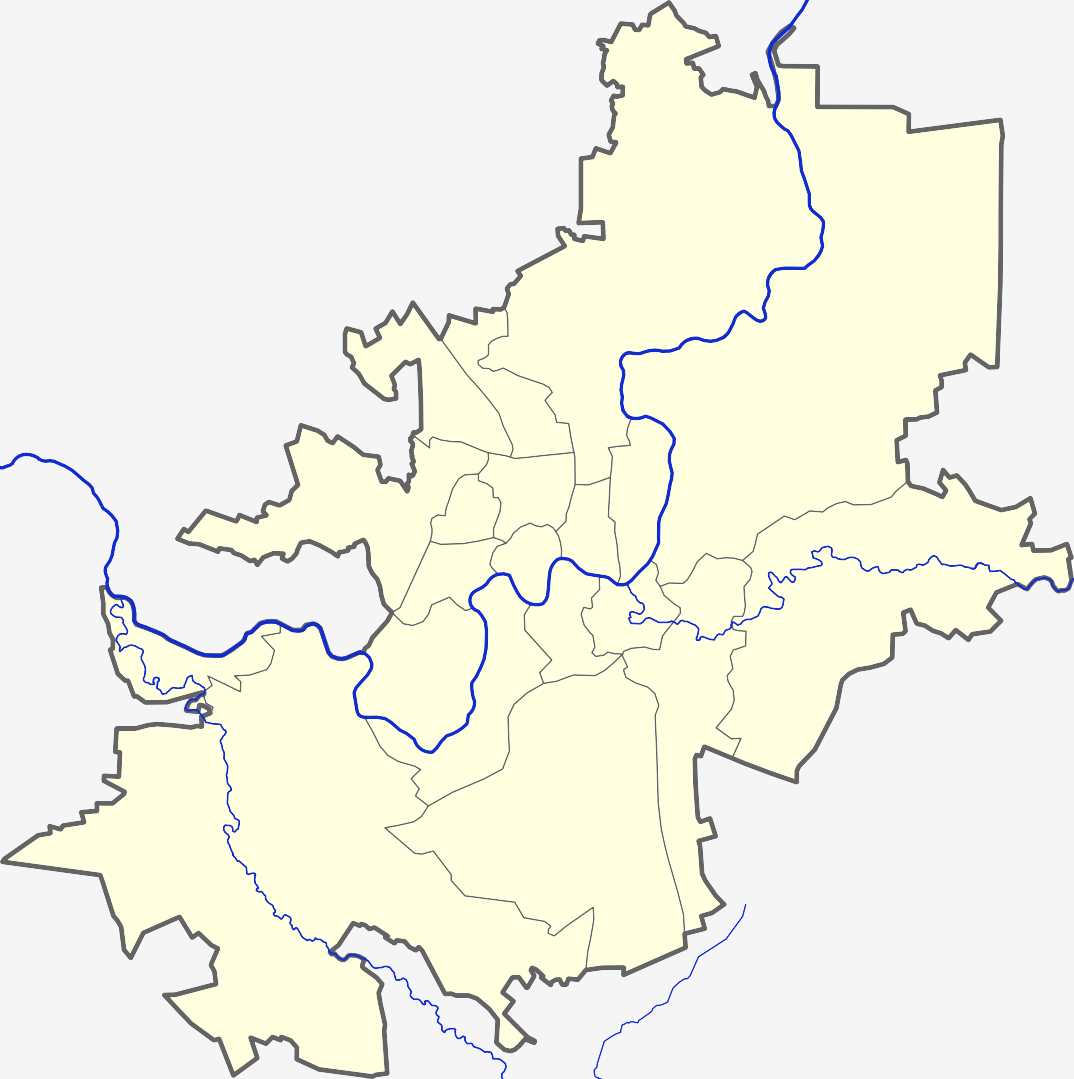
- Location of the destroyed synagogue in Vilnius, Lithuania

Religion
- Affiliation: Orthodox Judaism (former)
- Rite: Nusach Ashkenaz
- Ecclesiastical or organisational status: Synagogue (1572–c. 1941)
- Status: Destroyed

Location
- Location: I-2 Jewish Street, Vilnius' Old Town, Vilnius, Vilnius County
- Country: Lithuania
- Coordinates: 54°40′48″N 25°17′05″E

Architecture
- Type: Synagogue architecture
- Style: Renaissance; Baroque
- Groundbreaking: 1630
- Completed: 1633 (rebuild)
- Destroyed: c. 1955 – c. 1957

Specifications
- Capacity: 5,000 seats
- Materials: Stone

The Great Synagogue, officially, the Great City Synagogue in Vilna, also the Great Synagogue of Vilnius, is a former Orthodox Jewish congregation and synagogue which once stood at the end of Jewish Street (I-2) in the Old Town of Vilnius in Lithuania.

Designed in the Renaissance and Baroque styles, the stone building was completed in 1633 and operated as a synagogue until it was devastated by Nazis in 1941. In 1945, the former synagogue was still standing, although roofless. In 1946 the short-lived Jewish Museum of Vilnius tried to list the synagogue as a historic monument and thus to preserve it, but without success. In 1947 the synagogue was blasted and its ruins were demolished by 1957 and replaced by a kindergarten and a primary school. The synagogue was located on the spot of an existing synagogue built in 1572, the site had first been used to house a Jewish house of prayer in 1440.

== Structure ==
The synagogue had a number of entrances; one, at street level, consisted of a pair of iron gates that had been donated by a tailors' society in 1640; and the other entrance on the western side, added in 1800, was a bit more imposing: it had an elevated two-tiered wooden gable with a portal and wrought iron posts.

There was a heavy iron door with an original Hebrew inscription indicating it was a gift of a "society of Psalm reciters" in 1642. At the time of its building, ecclesiastical regulations common in Europe specified that a synagogue could not be built higher than a church. To obey the law, and yet create the necessary interior height, it was customary to dig a foundation deep enough for the synagogue's floor level to be well below that of the street. Outside, the synagogue looked to be about three stories tall, but inside it reached to over five stories. Another entrance with a vestibule and the "pillory" was located on the northern side of the building.

The interior of the synagogue was redesigned in the mid-18th century by Lithuanian German from Vilnius Johann Christoph Glaubitz in the Italian Renaissance style. Four massive, equidistant columns supported the vast stone-floored pile, and within them was the three-tiered ornate, rococo bimah, with a cupola, supported by eight small columns. It was built in the second half of the 18th century by Rabbi Judah ben Eliezer (commonly known as the YeSoD– an acronym of the three words Yehudah Sofer ve-Dayyan), a scribe and judge.

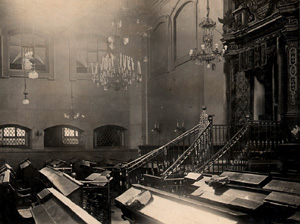
The Holy Ark

The two-tiered Holy Ark on the eastern wall was carved with gilded woodcarvings, representing plants, animals and Jewish symbols, with a double-headed eagle on top. It was approached by a twofold flight of steps, with iron balustrades, ascending from the right and the left. Hanging from the walls and ceilings there were numerous bronze and silver chandeliers. The synagogue contained a valuable collection of ritual objects. The building was repaired in the 19th century.

Formerly there was a seven-branched brass candelabrum in front of the Ark, but on the eve of the German invasion of the city during World War I, it was sent off to Moscow. There also once was a "Chair of Elijah" in the northwest corner on which the rite of brit milah was performed.

On both sides of the Holy Ark there were two-story structures, serving as the women's sections, connected to the prayer hall by little windows. Another gallery for women was situated along the north side, also consisting of two floors built by Noah Feibusch Bloch, a community elder who advanced the money and when the community was unable to return the 14,000 gulden due, he made a present of the structure.

The main prayer hall was square and could hold 300 people. The synagogue was also intended to serve as a stronghold within which the Jews could take refuge in times of danger. On the High Holy Days before World War II the synagogue held 5,000 worshipers.

In 1846, when Sir Moses Montefiore visited the synagogue, the treasurers distributed entrance tickets to the masses of people.

== Destruction ==
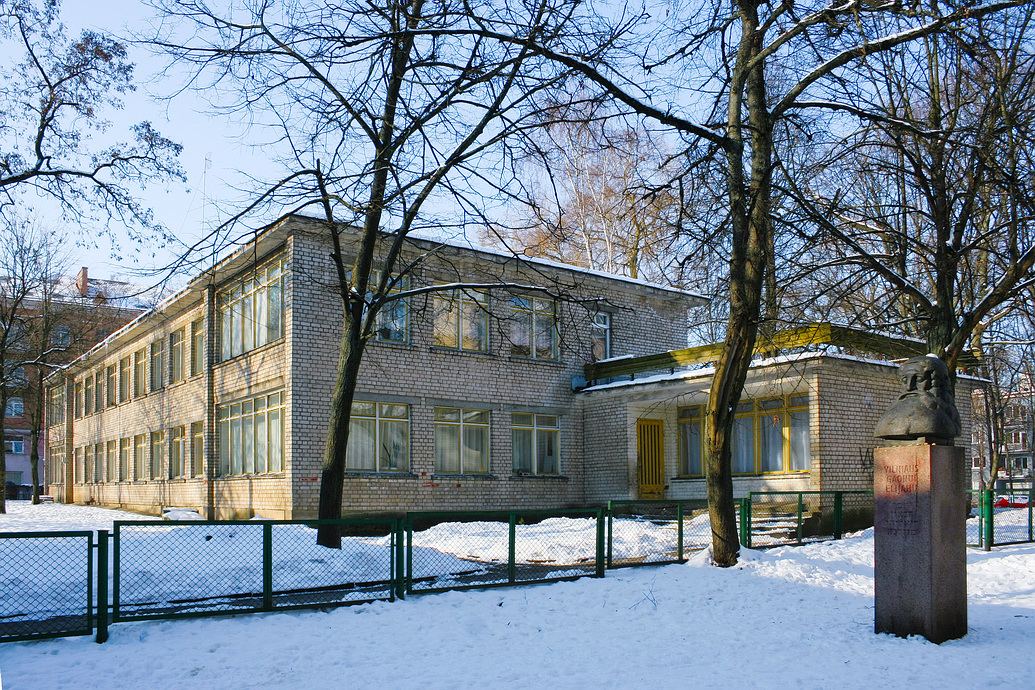
The site of the Synagogue today. The Vilna Gaon monument is at the right

The synagogue was looted, burned, and partly destroyed by the Nazis during World War II. The ruined synagogue and the whole "schulhof" complex that had grown around it were demolished by the Soviet authorities from 1955 to 1957 and were intentionally replaced by a basketball court and a kindergarten to effectively prevent any future initiatives to rebuild a cultural monument. The kindergarten was later replaced by a primary school.

Three original pieces from the Great Synagogue of Vilna survived the destruction and are now on display at the Vilna Gaon Jewish Museum: a door of the Holy Ark, a reader’s desk, and a bas-relief with the Ten Commandments.

== Plans of restoration ==
In 2011, Lithuanian Prime Minister Andrius Kubilius and Vilnius Mayor Artūras Zuokas announced plans to restore the synagogue, after successful archaeological exploration of synagogue ruins in the same year. In 2014, Israeli president Shimon Peres, who was introduced to the project during his official visit in Lithuania in 2013, was invited to join the board, together with Lithuania's former President Valdas Adamkus, Lithuanian PM Algirdas Butkevičius and the prominent architect Daniel Liebeskind for the restoration project. The project's Israeli architect, Tsila Zak, elaborated her original plans that had been already adopted by the municipal authorities of Vilnius in 1993, following an international competition in 1989–1990 in which she participated together with the Swedish sculptor Willy Gordon.

The original walls of the Great Synagogue were pinpointed by a team of archaeologists from the Israel Antiquities Authority, the Hebrew University of Jerusalem, and three American universities using ground-penetrating radar in June 2015 beneath the grounds of modern school building. Excavations began in 2016, when a group led by Dr. Harry Jol of the American University of Wisconsin–Eau Claire excavated what is thought to be a portion of the synagogue's mikveh. In July 2018, the archaeologists announced the discovery of the Baroque bimah. Vilnius Mayor Remigijus Šimašius said that the plans were to demolish the Soviet-built premises, since the primary school had moved out in 2017, and replace it with a meaningful memorial and exposition of the ruins, but not a complete reconstruction of the synagogue, to be completed by 2023.

=== Archaeological discoveries ===
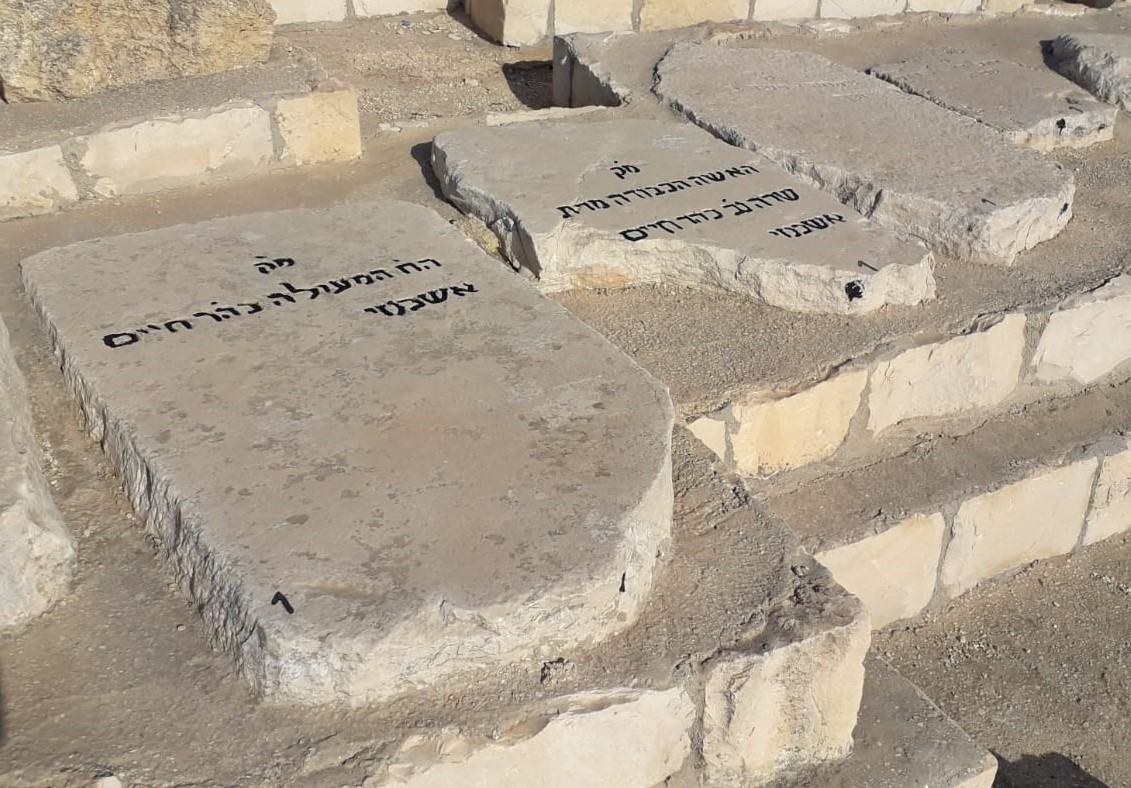
Sarah and Rabbi Haim Tombstones on Mount Olives Cemetery, Jerusalem, Israel. The couple emigrated from Vilna to Tiberias, from there they moved to Jerusalem where they died. Sarah in 1782 and Haim in 1786.

In 2019 archaeologists uncovered Hebrew inscription at the excavation of the Great Synagogue. The large and significant inscription, dated to 1796, was part of a stone Torah reading table that stood on the magnificent Bimah of the synagogue in Vilnius. The table was donated – according to the text – by two brothers – Rabbi Eliezer and Rabbi Shmuel, in memory of their mother, Sarah, and their father, Rabbi Chaim, who, according to the inscription, had emigrated from Lithuania to Eretz Israel and settled in Tiberias. It was from this table that the Torah was read to the congregants for about 200 years, until the burning of the synagogue and its final destruction by the Soviets, 70 years ago.

The inscription, which was studied together with Dr. Vladimir Levin of the Hebrew University of Jerusalem, reads:

In the year ‘Raise us with joy to our country [1796], [This Torah reading table] was donated by R. Eliezer and R. Shmuel, the sons of R. Chaim who lived in Tiberias, be it rebuilt and reestablished soon in our days. ‘And died Sarah’ [Gen. 23:2] our mother, the daughter of R. Shabbtai, on the 4th of Adar ‘I gave to Jerusalem a messenger of good news’ [Is. 41:27] [1782] and our father R. Chaim son of R. Chaim died there on the 7th of Nissan ‘arise and have mercy on Zion [Ps. 102:14] [1786].

These brief sentences point to the deep connection between the Lithuanian (Litvak) community and the Holy Land, which has existed since the days of the Gaon of Vilna until the present day. According to the preliminary investigation the donor family was one of the leading rabbinical families in Lithuania at the beginning of the 18th century.

Yehudah (Udi) Mizrahi-Tzoref, independent researcher of the Sephardic community and its burial lots on Mount Olives, Tzameret-Rivka Avivi volunteer in historical documentation of talking tombstones project, Rabbi Mordechay Motola, independent researcher of Sephardic Hachamim and of the Mount Olives cemetery, Micha Carmon, genealogist and with assistance of the information desk at Mount Olives – Jerusalem, identified and located the burial place of the couple Rabbi Haim and Sarah. The couple was buried in the ancient cemetery of the Sephardic community on Mount Olives Jerusalem. As the custom those days, their family name was not engraved on their tombstones rather the indication “Ashkenazi”, which points to their relevance origin. The tombstones were phrased by Sephardic persons, who constituted the majority of Jerusalem community at that time.

Both tombstones are adjacent to each other, which may indicate on family relation between the deceases, this is also evident based from the text on the tombstone:

Sarah tombstone writing:

M’K [mekom kevurat/matzevat kevruat [place of burial/ tombstone of burial]
The honorable lady Mrs. Sarah N’B [Nevat Beto] KeHaR [Kevod Harav] [His honorable Rabbi] Haim […]
Ashkenazi

Haim tombstone writing:

M’K [mekom kevurat/matzevat kevruat] [place of burial/ tombstone of burial]
The excellent Ha[cham] [Clever] KeHaR [Kevod Harav] [His honorable Rabbi] Haim
Ashkenazi

Haim immigrated to Eretz Israel with his wife Sarah in 1770 or 1772, together with Rabbi Azriel of Shklow – the grandfather of Rabbi Yisroel of Shklov- of the HaGra Students immigration leaders, died and buried in the cemetery on Mount Olives in the holy city of Jerusalem. The text from the Vilna synagogue mentions the names of Rabbi Haim’s two sons of– Rabbi Shmuel and Rabbi Eliezer. They can be identified as the brothers Shmuel and Eliezer sons of Rabbi Haim Shabtls, the first “Vilna's Earls” descendants of Rabbi Moshe Ravkash. The grandfather of HaGra Rayi”l Frumkin recounted that R Haim that immigrated to Eretz Israel was the son of Rabbi Haim, the son-in-law of Rabbi Shabtai Hefetz from Vilna and grandfather of Rabbi Yitzchak Elyiahu Landa. According to the text exposed at the Vilna synagogue in the archeologic excavation, conducted by Dr Yohanan Zeligman, the couple Rabbi Haim and Sarah emigrated from Vilna to Tiberias, from there they moved to Jerusalem where they died. Sarah in 1782 and Haim in 1786.

In 2026 parts of the prayer hall and the women´s atrium were uncovered by archeologists. The bimah was fully uncovered. The uncovered prayer hall floor had a colorful terazzo floor decorated with floral and geometric motifs. Also found were metal seat plaques that were originally attached to wooden seats of the synagogue with the names of the congregates, a metal plaque with the Ten Commandments and pieces of crockery, including fragments of a Passover Seder plate made by Sussman Ceramic works.

The archeological excavations were possible due to the demolition of the postwar nursery school in 2025, that was built on the site of the synagogue.

== Gallery ==
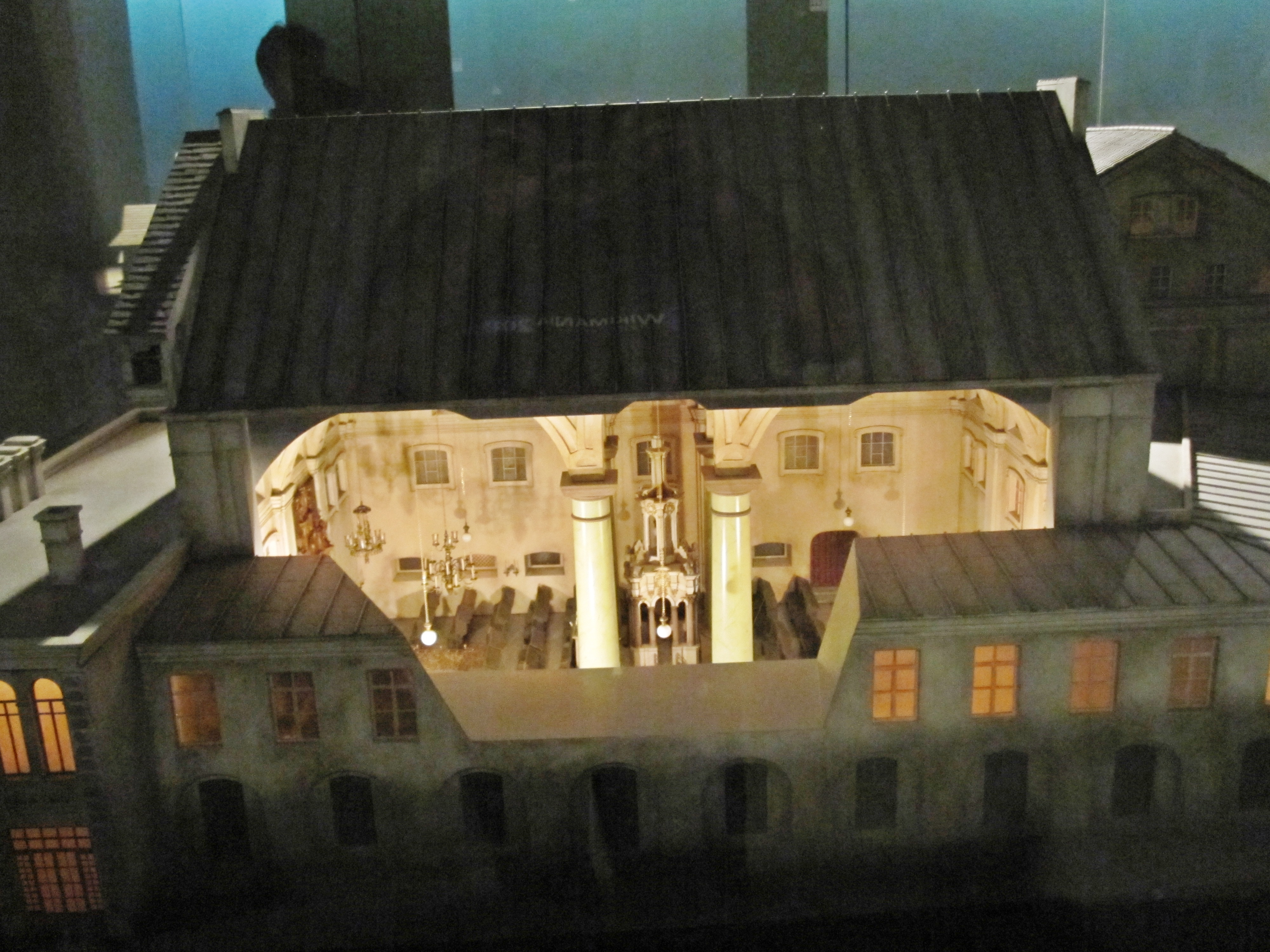
Model of the Great Synagogue at the Diaspora Museum, Tel Aviv

Postcard c. 1920

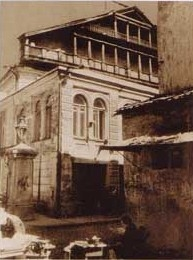
Western flank

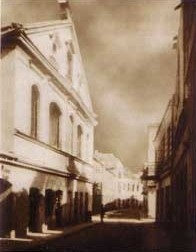
Eastern flank

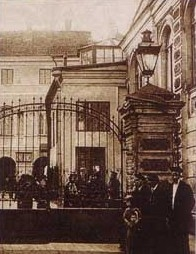
Gate to the courtyard

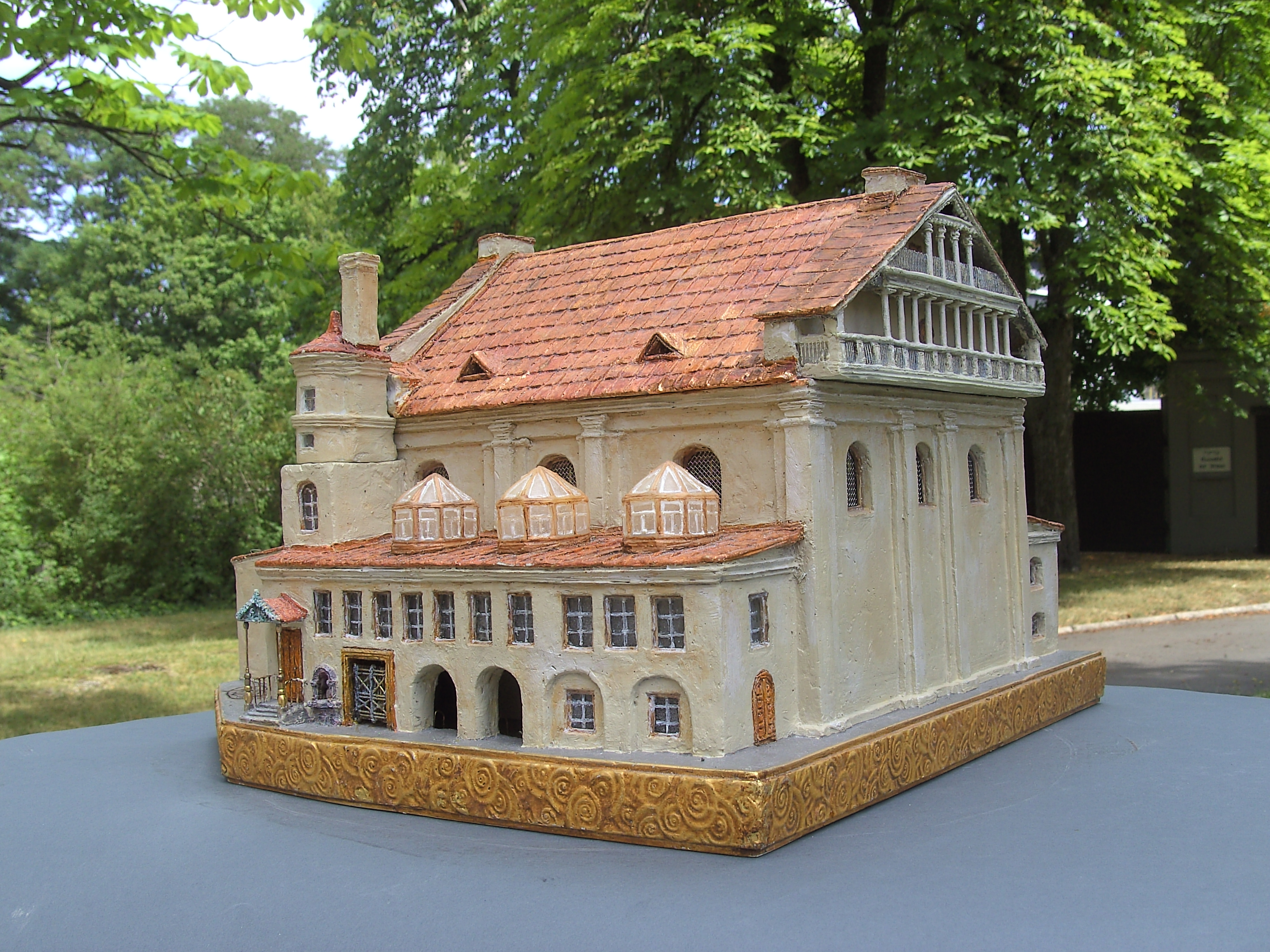
Model of the Great Synagogue, 2018

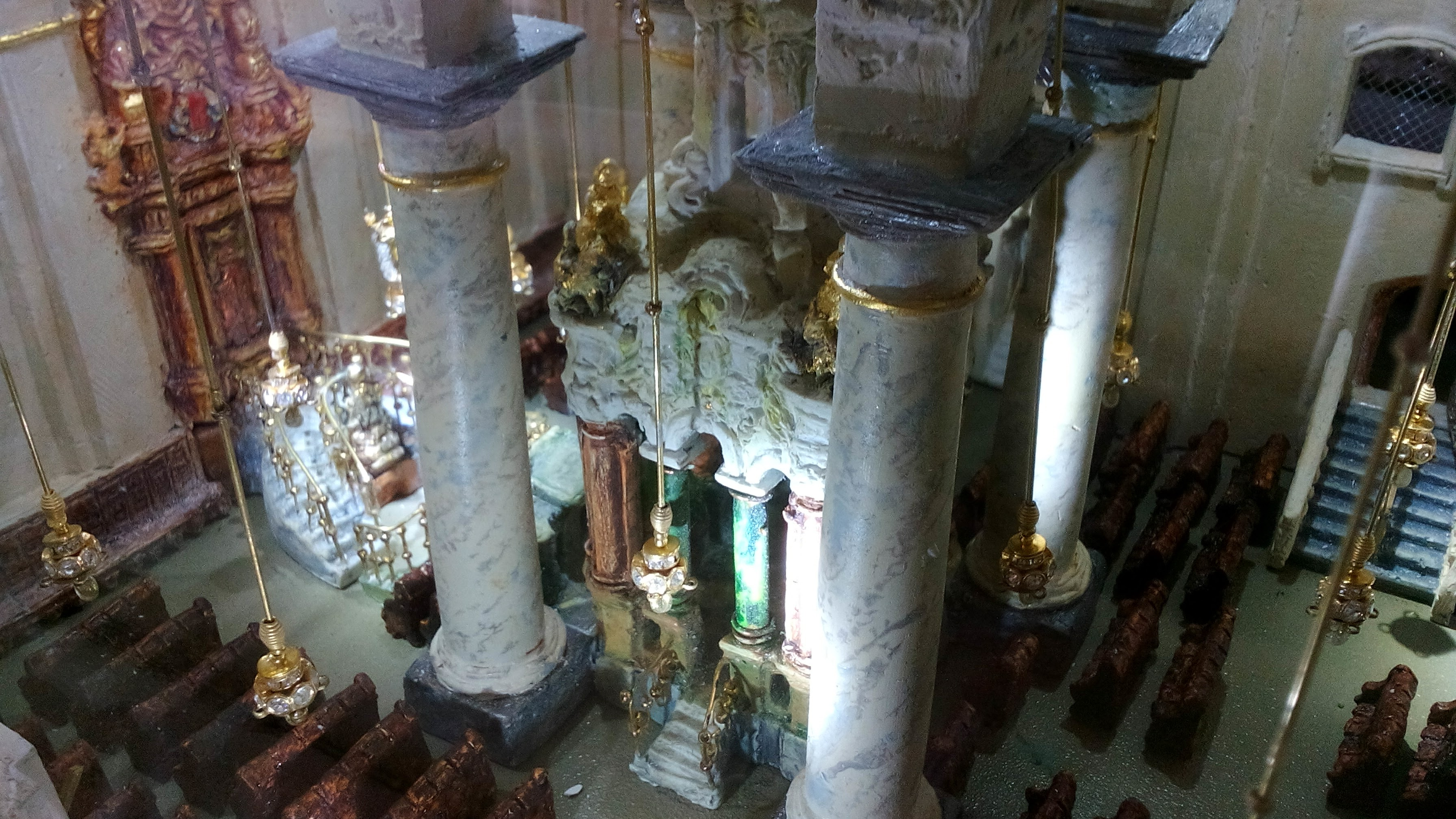
Model (interior) of the Great Synagogue 2018

== See also ==
- History of the Jews in Poland
- Lithuanian Jews
- Vilna Gaon
