= Tint Swe (politician, born 1948) =

Burmese politician

- တင့်ဆွေ
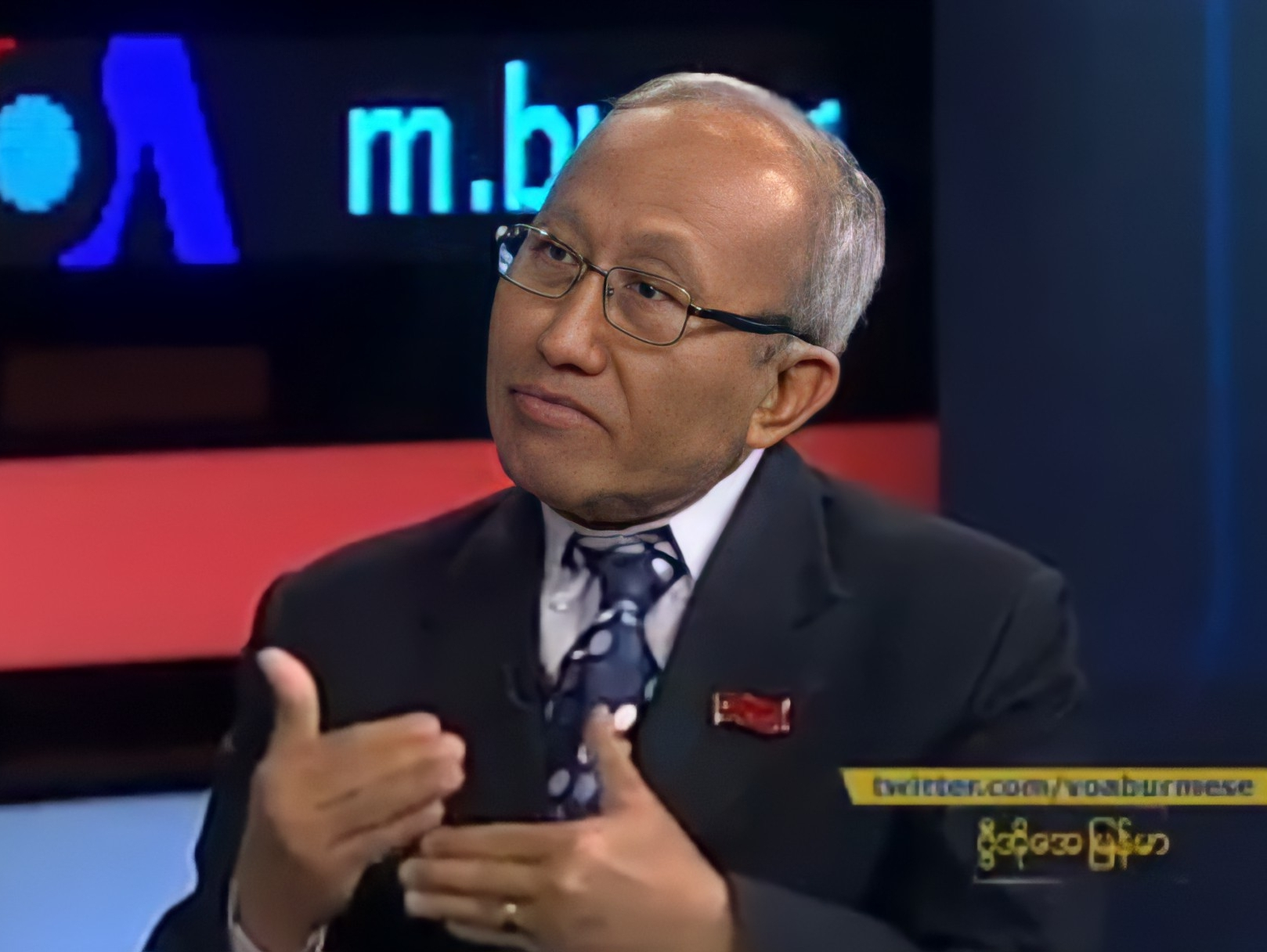
- Dr Tint Swe in 2015 at the VOA discussion

Minister for Prime Minister’s Office of National Coalition Government of the Union of Burma
- In office 7 October 2000 – ?
- Prime Minister: Sein Win
- Preceded by: Mya Win
- Succeeded by: ?

Minister for Health and Education of National Coalition Government of the Union of Burma
- In office ?–?
- Prime Minister: Sein Win

Minister for Information of National Coalition Government of the Union of Burma
- In office 23 January 2009 – 14 September 2012
- Succeeded by: Position abolished

Member-elect of Pyithu Hluttaw (1990)
- Preceded by: Constituency established
- Succeeded by: Constituency abolished
- Constituency: Pale Township № 2
- Majority: 33,195

Chairman of the National League for Democracy-Liberated Area (India)
- In office 1991–2006
- Succeeded by: U Cho

Personal details
- Born: 9 August 1948 (age 78) Pale, Myanmar
- Party: National League for Democracy
- Spouse: Mya Mya Aye
- Parent(s): Ba Cho (father); Khin Khin (mother)
- Education: Institute of Medicine, Mandalay (MBBS)

Tint Swe (Burmese: တင့်ဆွေ; born 9 August 1948) is a Burmese physician and politician who was elected MP for Pyithu Hluttaw in the 1990 election. He has served as Minister for Prime Minister's Office of National Coalition Government of the Union of Burma (NCGUB). He also served as the Minister for Information in office from 23 January 2009 to 14 September 2012, and chairperson of the National League for Democracy-Liberated Area (India).

== Early life and education ==
Tint Swe was born on 9 August 1948 in Minywa village, Pale, Myanmar to Ba Cho and Khin Khin. He graduated high school from State High School No. 2 in Monywa. He graduated from the Institute of Medicine, Mandalay with medical degree (MBBS) in 1972, and spent 15 years practicing as a medical officer in Monywa, Ngazun, Sagaing, Pale. In 1970, he married Mya Mya Aye, and he resigned from government service in 1988.

== Career ==
Tint Swe joined the National League for Democracy in 1988, after the 8888 Uprising. In the 1990 elections, he was elected as the Pyithu Hluttaw MP for Constituency No. 2 of Pale Township, Sagaing Division winning a majority of 33,195 (61.08% of the votes), but was not allowed to assume his seat. He was among the elected MPs who worked clandestinely to form the National Coalition Government of the Union of Burma.

In October 1990, he escaped from arrest and fled to India. Tint Swe joined the NCGUB and served as senior representative from 1991 to 1995. Then, he became a Sein Win's cabinet minister for NCGUB. He also served as Minister for Prime Minister's Office (West) and Minister for Health and Education. On 14 September 2012, NCGUB was officially dissolved and he retired from NCGUB.

He had served as the chairman of Burma Centre Delhi (BCD). He then founded the Yamuna Clinic in 2002, a project to offer free primary medical health care to Burmese refugees in Delhi. He lived in India for many years and pursued with the Indian media and civil society for supporting the pro-democracy movement in Myanmar. He arrived in India on 21 December 1990 and left for the USA on 18 September 2014. Now, he resides in Indianapolis, Indiana, United States.

He visited Burma for the first time after 27 1/2 years in May 2018. He stayed there for 7 weeks in Burma and returned to Indianapolis on 19 June 2018.
