= Za Hlei Thang =

Burmese politician

Dr. Za Hlei Thang
- ဇာလှေထန်း
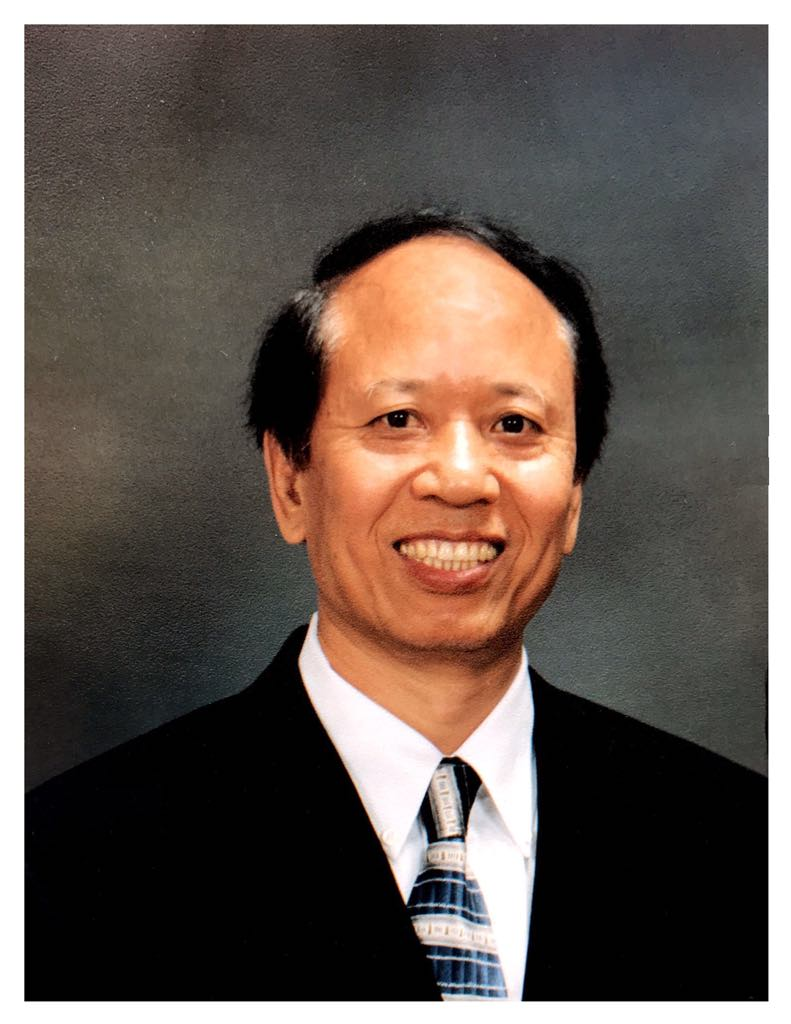
- Dr. Za Hlei Thang

Elected Member of the Pyithu Hluttaw 1990 General Election of Burma
- In office 1990–1990
- Constituency: Falam Township

Personal details
- Born: 6 April 1943 Tlauhmun Village, Falam Township, Chin State
- Died: 17 May 2018 (aged 75) Frederick, Maryland, U.S.
- Party: Chin National League for Democracy
- Spouse: Pi Ni Dong
- Children: 4
- Education: University of Medicine 1, Yangon
- Occupation: Doctor, politician

Za Hlei Thang (Burmese: ဇာလှေထန်း) (6 April 1943 – 17 March 2018) was a Burmese politician who was elected Member of Parliament as the Chin National League for Democracy candidate in the 1990 Myanmar general election. After the 1990 election, he fled Burma after the State Law and Order Restoration Council accused him of breaking the 1962 Printers and Publishers Registration Act, Article 20. While in exile, he served as Chairman of the Chin National League for Democracy, a "Chin party in exile". He also served as Minister of Social Welfare and Development and Minister of Health and Education at the National Coalition Government of the Union of Burma which is a "government in exile" led by Dr. Sein Win. He also served as Chairman of the Chin National Front which is a Chin insurgent group in Myanmar (Burma). He dedicated his life in the Chin national movement.

== Early years and education ==
Za Hlei Thang was born on 6 April 1943 at Tlauhmun Village, Falam Township, Chin State. He studied primary school at Tlauhmun village and continued to study middle school at Falam City, the then capital city of Chin Special Division (now Chin State). The government awarded scholarship to study at Myoma High School (Basic Education High School No. 2 Dagon) in Yangon. He passed his matriculation exam in 1964 and he was the only student qualified for Medical School from the school. He studied medicine at the University of Medicine-1, Yangon from 1965 onwards. He joined the Chin Literature and Culture Committee and was active in politics.

== University activities ==
On 2 March 1962 the Union Revolutionary Council led by General Ne Win staged a coup d’état’ against the democratically elected government in Burma. On 2 December 1968, The Union Revolutionary Council set up an Internal Unity Advisory Board to advise the Union Revolutionary Council on how to restore internal unity and to draft a new constitution for the country. The Union Revolutionary Council also officially invited the public to give suggestions for the Union constitution either on individual basis or in groups through a Liaison Officer appointed by the government. A Chin law student Lian Uk and his friends drafted and published the "Proposal of the Chin Youths" which demanded democracy and federalism. Copies of the document were then distributed to all Chin University students in Yangon. The Chin students were requested to read the document and sign if they agreed with its contents. The document was then submitted to the Union Revolutionary Council via liaison officer. Medical student Za Hlei Thang had great interest in the document and he was among the signatories.

He was also actively helping the Chin Democracy Party set up in Thailand, in alliance with U Nu’s Parliamentary Democracy Party to start an armed revolution against General Ne Win regime. As a result, he was arrested by the Burma Military Intelligence Services (MIS) for his role in aiding the underground movement of the Chin Democracy Party and also for signing the "Proposal of the Chin Youths". He was arrested in December 1972 under an operation known in Burmese as "Sin-Phyu-Daw Operation" which means the White Elephant Operation. After he was tortured and questioned at Bahan MI6 Interrogation Center, he was transferred to the notorious Insein Prison. There, he was put into solitary confinement for nine months. While he was in Insein prison, he met with Salai Tin Maung Oo who led student demonstration during the U Thant funeral crisis and Shwedagon Strike in 1974 and 1975 respectively. As, Salai Tin Maung Oo was a Chin ethnic, Za Hlei Thang invited him to join the Chin students’ movements. He encouraged and help Salai Tin Maung Oo to be elected as general secretary in the Chin Literature and Culture Committee. After the U Thant funeral crisis, he went underground and then returned to Yangon. When the military intelligence personnel searched to arrest Salai Tin Maung Oo, Dr Za Hlei Thang hid him at his house. Salai Tin Maung Oo was finally arrested by MIS and later secretly hanged in Insein Prison on 26 June 1976. Dr. Za Hlei Thang was released from Insein Prison in 1974 and he continued to study medicine. He obtained M.B.B.S. degree from the University of Medicine-1, Yangon in 1977. He worked as a house surgeon at Mawlamyine General Hospital from 1977 – 1978.

== Life in Tahan, Sagaing Division ==
Dr. Za Hlei Thang wanted to serve the Chin people so he moved to Tahan in 1979 and opened the Highlander Clinic. During this time in Tahan, he played a leading role in promoting the use of Chin (Lai) ethnic language in Tahan. He also founded the music group Salai-M who were the most popular music group in Kalay valley at that time. He was also the founding father of Salem Baptist Church, El-Bethel Baptist Church, Lairawn Baptist Associations and Bethel Theological Seminary.

== 1990 election in Burma ==
After the 1988 uprising, the State Law and Order Restoration Council prepared for a free election and allow political party to be formed. Dr. Za Hlei Thang then went to Falam and founded the Chin Democratic Party. He went to Yangon to register the party, however, Chin National League for Democracy (CNLD) formed by Chin students who took part during the 1988 uprising and the Chin politicians managed to persuade him to join them. He joined the CNLD for the sake of the unity of the Chin people and was selected as Vice Chairman for the party. It was the period where the military intelligence personnel were threatening and intimidating the candidates with various methods. Consequently, his house was searched several times by military intelligence personnel and seized party related documents. He was arrested and charged under the Article 20 of the Printing and Publishing Act 1962. While he was released on bail, he stood as a candidate for Falam Constituency II and was elected as Member of Parliament in the Chamber of Deputies. After the April election of the 1990, he continued to appeal his case. The Township Court referred his case to District Court, then subsequently to High Court. Due to the military pressure the High Court then referred his case back to Township Court. He realized that he had no chance of winning the case and his lawyer also advised him to flee the country before he was arrested. He left Burma for India on 17 December 1990. After he fled, the State Law and Order Restoration Council declared him a fugitive. The Election commission dismissed him as an MP on 22 February 1991. The Election commission Announcement No. 914 of 22-2-91 states

Ousted Hluttaw representative U Za Hlei Thang. While action was being taken for infringing Section 20 of the Printers and Publishers Registration Law, he absconded to Aizawl in Mizoram, India, and so the court concerned then ruled he is an absconder.

== Political activities while in exile ==
Dr. Za Hlei Thang served as chairman of the Chin National League for Democracy while in exile. He joined the National Coalition Government of the Union of Burma in 1995 and was later appointed Minister of Social Welfare and Development. He was also appointed Minister for Health and Education in July 1997. However, he couldn't serve for long as he was suffering from Toxic goiter. He later joined his family to Maryland in USA in the year of 2000. Although he was not in good health, he was an active participant of the Members of Parliamentarian Union and a member of the Chin National Council. He was also one of the founding members of the Chin Forum. He also served one term as Chairman of the Chin National Front.

== Honour ==
The Chin Community of USA conferred him "Person of the Year" award in 2005.

== Death and funeral ==
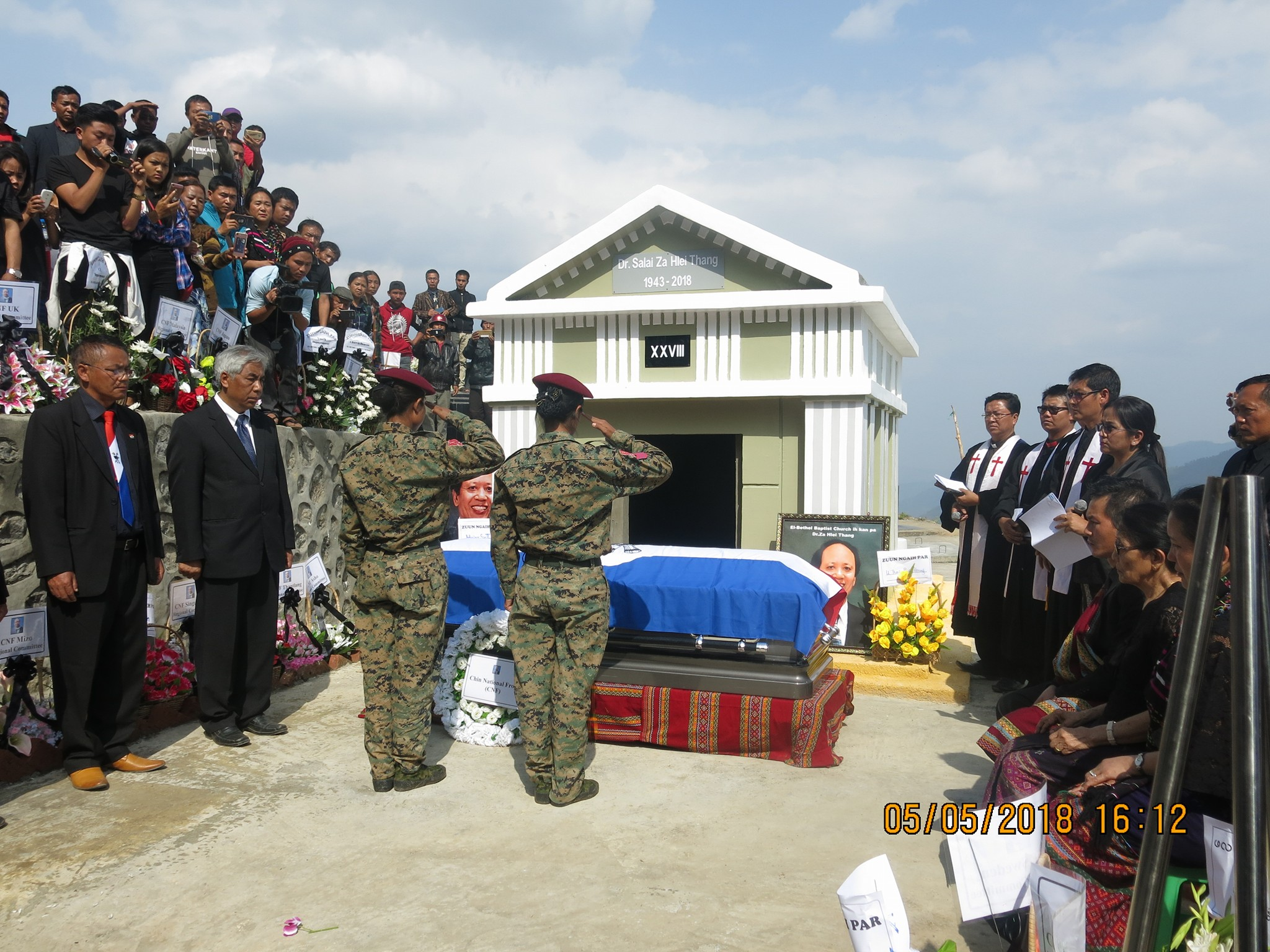
Chin National Army soldiers salute Dr. Za Hlei Thang

Dr. Za Hlei Thang died of lung disease in Maryland, USA on 17 March 2018. It was his wish to be buried in his beloved hometown of Falam. A funeral service was held in Maryland, USA on 21 April 2018. Chin politicians, community leaders, church leaders, family and friends paid tribute to Dr. Za Hlei Thang. His coffin was flown to Yangon, Burma by Korean Airlines and arrived at Yangon International Airport on 2 May 2018. He was greeted by friends, families, comrades, politicians, church leader and various community leaders. Many organizations in Yangon laid wreaths on his coffin and paid him respect.

His coffin then reached Tahan on 3 May 2018. Again, he was greeted by mass public and his coffin was placed inside the hall of Lairawn Baptist Association. On the night of 3 May, devotion was made and the hall was filled with mourners. After a brief service on the morning of 4 May, his body was then transported to Falam by column of cars.

The people of Falam in their thousands greeted him at the entrance of the city. Chin tradition flint lock guns were fired in honour of his arrival. Chin traditional songs and poem were read to honour him. His coffin was then placed overnight in the Townhall of Falam. On 5 May 2018, funeral service was held at Falam Baptist Church and his coffin was then transported to the Lampa Cemetery. At the cemetery, the Chin National Army gave him a full military honour and his body was laid to rest by the Rev. Daniel Vai Lian Zul. After 28 years of leaving his beloved country, he finally rests in peace in his beloved city, Falam, the former capital of Chin Special Division (now Chin State).
