= Bommersvik =

Union college in Södertälje, Sweden

Coordinates: 59°7′45″N 17°27′13″E

Bommersvik Logo

Bommersvik is a Union college (Swedish: Förbundskola from Förbund meaning union or association and skola meaning school or college) built by the Swedish Social Democratic Youth League (SSU) and is situated outside the municipality of Södertälje in Sweden. Parts of the college grounds encompass a conference centre and recreational facilities that are extensively used by social democratic organizations both in Sweden and abroad. An art gallery can also be found on the grounds.

== Mission ==
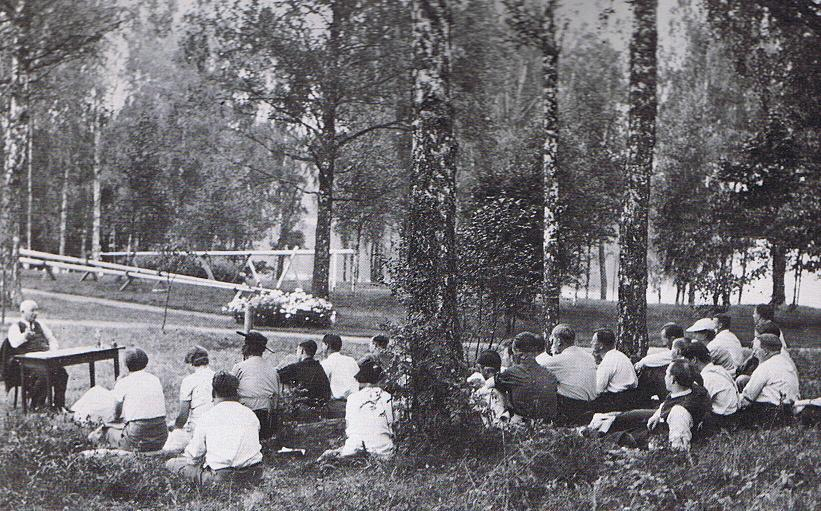
Prime Minister Per Albin Hansson lecturing at Bommersvik in 1940

The college was formed for the SSU and the Swedish Social Democratic Party to educate and train the next generation of trade union and political leaders by establishing an institution of higher learning to instruct young social democrats on political matters such as trade union agreements and laws. Today it offers many courses each year on political science. The curriculum is different from a regular political science academy in that the content of the courses is primarily focused on issues concerning the politics of the labour movement.

The backgrounds of the professors teaching at the college vary and, depending on the course, lecturers can be recruited from the party and from the unions and labour movement. Prime ministers or cabinet ministers sometimes lecture on subjects of political interest. The Swedish Prime Minister Per Albin Hansson lectured at Bommersvik as early as the summer of 1940.

Foreign lecturers also visit the college, starting with Willy Brandt who lectured on 1 December 1940 about the problems experienced by the social democrats in Nazi Germany and the occupied countries at the start of World War II.

In 2010, the college began cooperating with Uppsala University so that students from the university can now attend rhetoric classes at Bommersvik.

== History ==
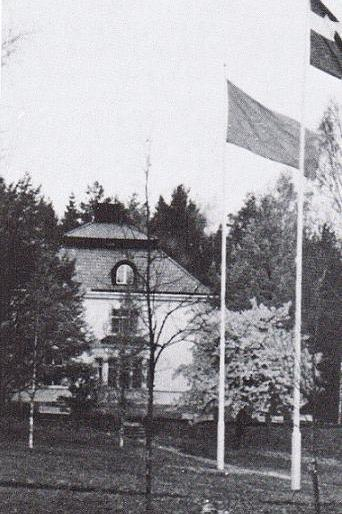
Colonel Lundeberg extracted a promise from the SSU that the Swedish flag would always be raised higher than the SSU banner. This promise has been kept by the SSU ever since.

In 1934, ideas about creating a college for the Youth League began to form after Ivan Ohlson, one of the great leaders of the Swedish Labor movement, became inspired following a study trip to the Netherlands and Belgium and in 1936 work commenced to find an appropriate building. This was familiar territory for the SSU since the association already had gone through a similar process with another school, the Brunnsviks adult education college in Ludvika. Ivan Ohlson went on a late summer day to Bommersvik, with its beautiful natural surroundings, was sufficiently impressed with the place and recommended it as the future location for the school. His recommendation was officially adopted and in 1937 the decision was formalised. Ivan Ohlson is considered to be the founder of Bommersvik and one of the school's halls is named in his honour.

It was decided, after a search, that the school would be built on the grounds of a local farm. This property was owned by Colonel Lundeberg.

Only through a fundraising drive among the members and other organisations within the Labor Movement, including the social democratic women's association, the party and trade unions etc. could the Socialist Party and the SSU find sufficient funds to buy Colonel Lundeberg's farm. The colonel, however, thought that selling the farm directly to the SSU was a sensitive matter, (since he was a military man with no association with the socialists), so, officially, Ivan Ohlson bought the farm instead, for 127,000 sek and a down payment of 20 000 which was a lot of money at that time. Colonel Lundeberg also extracted a promise from the SSU that the Swedish flag would always be raised higher than the SSU banner. This promise has been kept by the SSU ever since.

The opening ceremony was held on 14 September 1937 with about 800 SSU members and party officials on the grounds. There was also high pressure on the officials involved because, among other things, of the press coverage of the event and of the political pressure by the social democrats. Algot Andersson became the first manager of the college.

Another important event took place when Tage Erlander withdrew in 1969 as party leader and Prime Minister, and his successor in both positions, Olof Palme, ordered an honorary residence be built for him on the grounds of Bommersvik, in recognition of Erlander's valuable and lengthy service as Prime Minister of Sweden. The house is called even to this day "Erlandervillan" meaning Erlander's villa. There, he and his wife Aina lived until his death in 1985.

== Culture and art ==
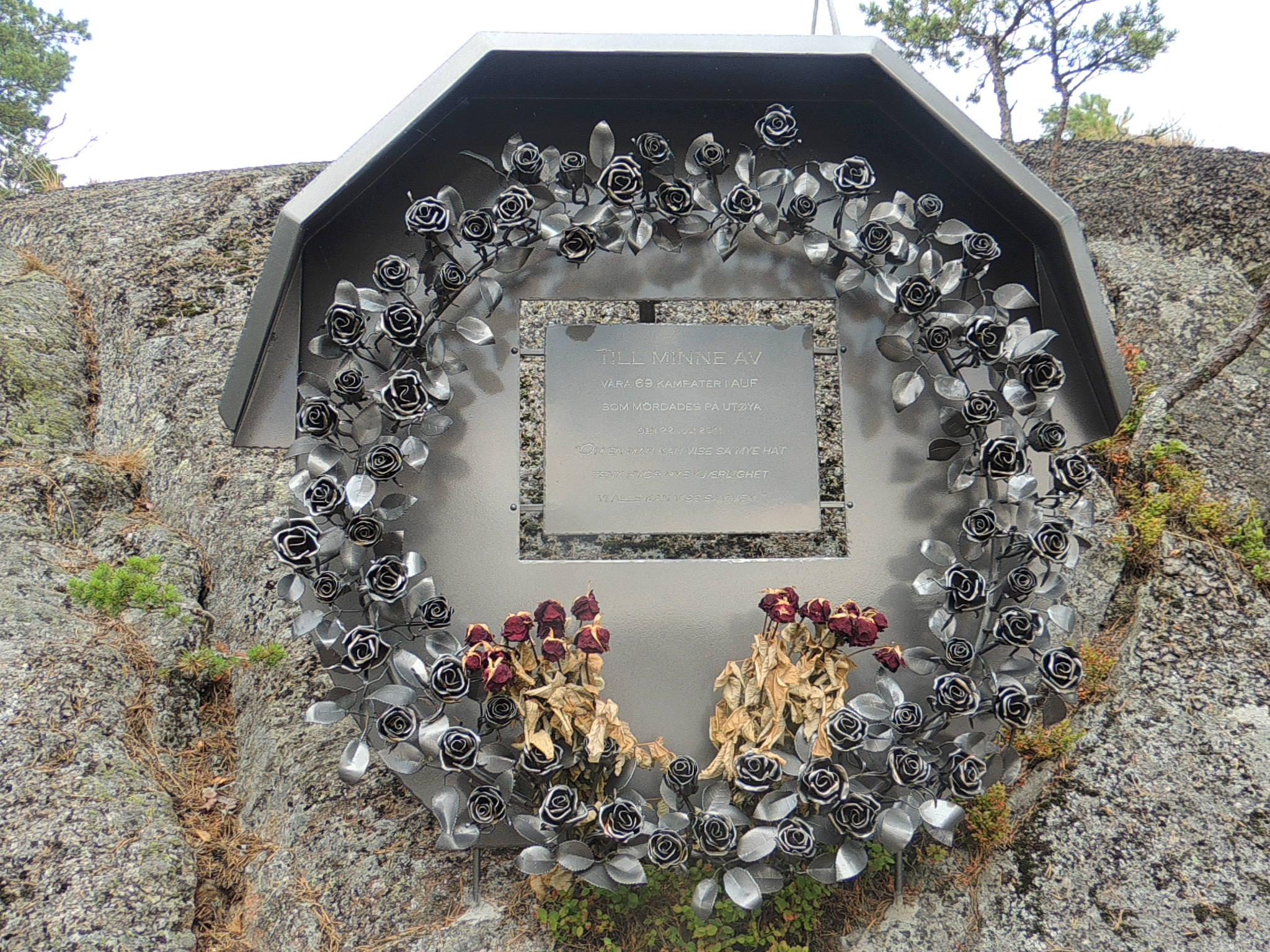
Monument on Bommersvik of Victims of Utoya massacre in 2011.

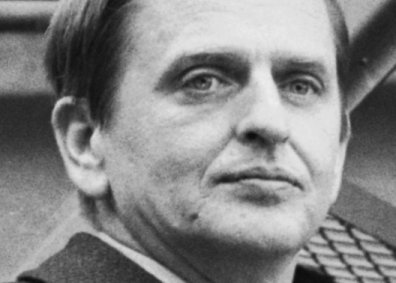
Olof Palme (pictured) donated the majority of the vases from the Ming Dynasty

Social democratic Prime Ministers have brought, from time to time, objets d'art and other curios on their travels to the college in order to enhance its culture and art collections. For example, Olof Palme has donated to the school the majority of the vases from the Ming Dynasty, the stuffed remains of a tiger and a gold statue of an Inca god. Various countries have also donated items for the school's collection. Perhaps the most controversial present was from North Vietnam, namely the part of an American airplane shot down during the Vietnam War. This piece exists as a display case exhibit at the school.

In the college, students learn about criticism of society and there also exist pictures of famous artists that created fine portraits of well-known social democrats. There is a large library with books about policy and from authors that describe the workers' lives in Sweden, the so-called proletärförfattare, (Swedish: proletär meaning proletarian and författare meaning author, i.e. authors for the proletariat), such as Eyvind Johnson and Harry Martinson who shared the Nobel Prize in Literature in 1974.

=== Significant art exhibits ===
- One of the most well-known sculptures in Bommersvik is Arne Jones's "Katedralen" (Cathedral), also featured on Bommervik's logo.
- "Torchlight processions", depicting the infamous Nazi torchlight marches, by artist Eric Johnsson. SSU received this as a present in 1937 as an indication of gratitude. Eric had among other things been forced to escape from Nazi Germany. SSU had criticized the Nazis in Germany long before the parent party did so in public.

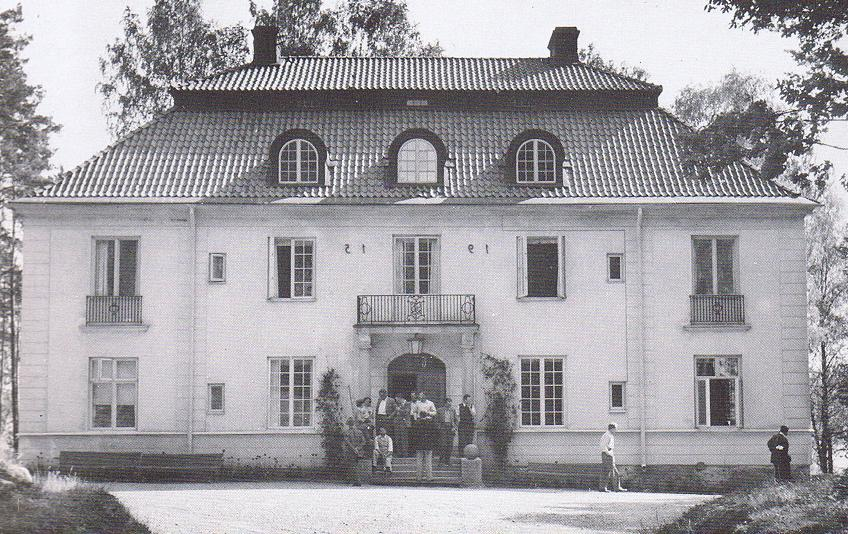
Bommersvik's main building: the Manor

- Tage Erlander and his legacy have always been important to the school and there are many portraits of him by artists such as Bo Beskow, Stig Claesson and Willem de Geer.
- The large oil painting "Proletarian fighting will" (Swedish: Proletär kampvilja the latter from kamp meaning fight and vilja meaning will) by Albin Amelin that hangs in the dining room is also a gift. The Amelin family wanted it to be displayed in a prominent place where many socialist supporters and members could view it.
- A copy of Carl Elds' sculpture “Youth” is exhibited while the original is left in the National museum.
- Folke Allards' aquarelle "Bommersvik i sommarskrud" (translated as: Bommersvik in summer clothes) is also a gift.
- "Light and mood" by Gösta Werner (painter) is an abstract painting and an attempt to expand artistic horizons and to depart from the tradition of socialist realism.
- Sculptor Willy Gordon created "The meeting" in miniature and the original exists in Östermalmstorg in Stockholm. The meeting, (Swedish: Mötet), is a controversial group of two modern sculptures representing a naked male figure bearing a piece of meat on his shoulders before a recumbent female figure.
- Ely Maoz, a well-known artist from Chile, painted a picture that hangs on a wall of the wing together with some SSU members' paintings. The painting is called "Freedom for all and Peace for the whole world". It was given to the school as a gesture of appreciation since the SSU criticized the dictatorship in Chile.

== Symbolic value ==
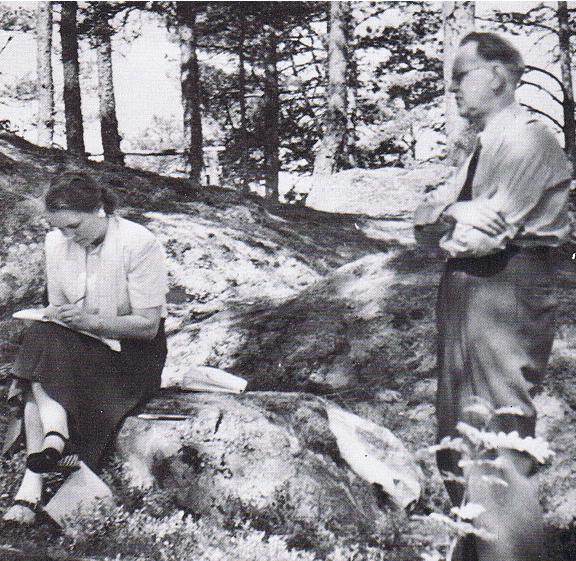
Tage Erlander ( Prime Minister of Sweden from 1946 to 1969.) dictating a letter to his secretary Maria Nyström in the natural surroundings of Bommersvik. Summer 1948.

Bommersvik possesses symbolic value for social democrats worldwide, and has become something of a socialist Mecca for them. This is also true for those who choose to tie the knot in Bommersvik. For example, two famous locals, Roger Möller and Gerd married there in 1978. Roger Möller later went on to become manager of the school. Many high echelon social democratic party officials have traditionally visited the place and many important meetings were scheduled in Bommersvik. Decisions such as, for example about ATP, have been discussed and analyzed at Bommersvik.

Bommersvik is a place that is a sanctuary and a source of inspiration for many, while also providing a recreation haven for social democrats. SSU member Lotta Axelsson described Bommersvik this way: Bommersvik inspires new ideas, and provides possibilities for recreation and strolling in a natural setting and for rest. There is actually little discussion about socialist issues during leisure activities, as visitors long for going back to nature.

Social democrat parliamentarians and government ministers come to Bommersvik when they need inspiration. For example, Ingvar Carlsson went to Bommersvik after the assassination of Olof Palme in order to relax there before presenting his new cabinet and the speech from the throne.

== International conferences ==
After the “Milan” building with its conference and lecture halls and interpreter facilities was completed in 1978 it was natural that the Socialist International organisation would now book conferences for Bommersvik. The Milan building and its facilities were inaugurated during the European Labor movement's conference in 1979, with a return engagement in 1985. Both conferences were convened by Palme, the Social Democratic Party leader. Many famous social democrats from other countries have visited Bommersvik through the years, including Shimon Peres, Neil Kinnock, Willy Brandt, Trygve Bratteli, Poul Nyrup Rasmussen, Kalevi Sorsa, Mário Soares, François Mitterrand and Bruno Kreisky. In addition, many other international conferences have also been held there, such as, for example, the 1989 congress of the International Union of Socialist Youth and the 2003 congress of the European Community Organisation of Socialist Youth (ECOSY). Anders Lindberg became the first Swedish president of ECOSY when he was elected by this congress.

== The Bommersvik Declarations ==
Bommersvik played a central role in international politics in 1995 and 2002 when the two conventions of the Elected Representatives of the Union of Burma took place and the following two landmark declarations were issued:

=== Bommersvik Declaration I ===
In 1995, during the first convention that lasted from 16 to 23 July, the Representatives issued the Bommersvik Declaration I with the following preamble:

We, the representatives of the people of Burma, elected in 27 May 1990 general elections, meeting at the First Convention of Elected Representatives from the liberated areas of Burma, hereby – Warmly welcome the unconditional release of 1991 Nobel Peace laureate Daw Aung San Suu Kyi on 10 July 1995; Thank all who have worked tirelessly and consistently for the release of Daw Aung San Suu Kyi and the cause of democracy in Burma; Applaud Daw Aung San Suu Kyi's determination, in spite of having spent 6 years under house arrest, to continue to work to bring true democracy to Burma; Welcome Daw Aung San Suu Kyi's return to politics to take up the mantle of her father, General Aung San, in Burma's second struggle for independence;...

— The Elected Representatives of the Union of Burma

=== Bommersvik Declaration II ===
In 2002, during the second convention that lasted from 25 February to 1 March, the Representatives issued the Bommersvik Declaration II with the following introduction:

We, the representatives of the people of Burma, elected in 27 May 1990 general elections presently serving as members of the National Coalition Government of the Union of Burma and/or the members of parliament Union, meeting at the Convention of Elected Representatives held in Bommersvik for the second time, hereby reaffirm – Our Mandate, Position, and Strategic Objectives – that we will never ignore the will of the Burmese people expressed through the May 1990 general elections; – that the military's refusal to honor the election results does not in any way diminish the validity of these results.....

— The Elected Representatives of the Union of Burma

== Managers ==
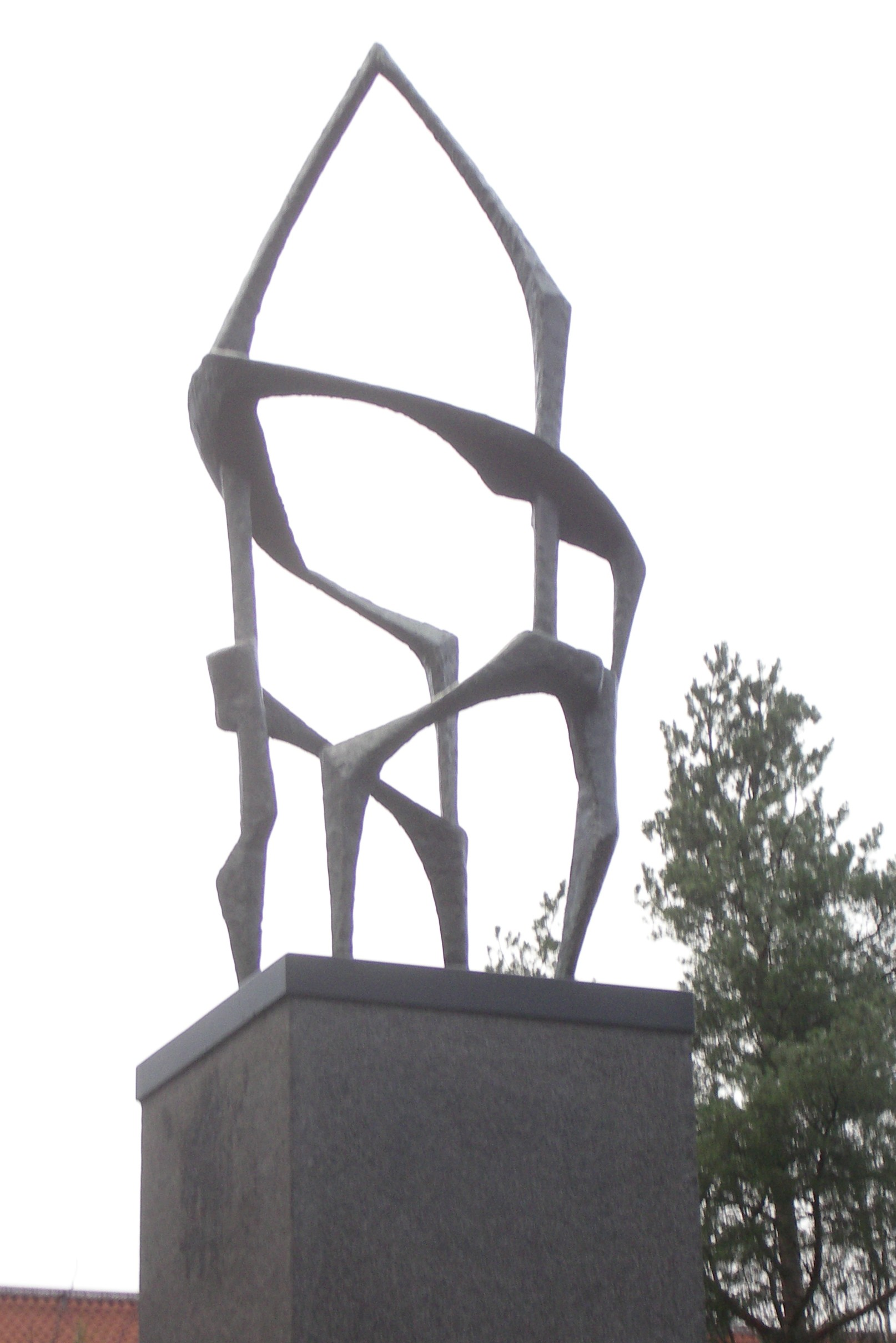
Arne Jones's Katedralen sculpture in Västertorp, Sweden. The sculpture provided the model for the school logo

Manager	Period
Algot Andersson	28 June 1937 – 30 June 1944
Stig Lundgren	1 July 1944 – 31 December 1949
Sven Erik Rosander	1 January 1950 – 31 December 1955
Kurt Ward	1 January 1956 – 31 December 1958
Kurt Axelsson	1 January 1959 – 31 October 1964
Leif Andersson	1 November 1964 – 1 October 1965
Ola Rask	1 November 1965 – 31 December 1965
Åke Edin	1 January 1966 – 1 March 1974
Bertil Stockhaus	1 March 1974 – 28 February 1981
Roger Möller	1 March 1981 – 30 September 1984
Leif Berglund	1 October 1984 -?
Niklas Renger	? – 1995
Håkan Lundberg (Now Alnebratt)	1995–1998
Mona Sahlin	1998-1998
Annelie Karlsson	1998–
