= Chin National League for Democracy =

Chin National League for Democracy ချင်းအမျိုးသားဒီမိုကရေစီအဖွဲ့ချုပ်
- Abbreviation: CNLD
- Founded: 1989
- Headquarters: Chin State
- Ideology: Chin interests
- Seats in the House of Nationalities: 0 / 224
- Seats in the House of Representatives: 0 / 440
- Seats in the Chin State Hluttaw: 1 / 20

Party flag

The Chin National League for Democracy (CNLD) is a political party in Myanmar seeking to represent the interests of the Chin people.

== History ==
Following the reintroduction of multi-party democracy after the 8888 Uprising, the CNLD contested 13 seats in the 1990 general elections. It received 0.4% of the vote, winning three seats: U.C.K. Taikwell in Falam 1, Za Hlei Thang in Falam 2 and U Shein Pe Ling in Mindat.

The party was banned by the military government on 18 March 1992, but was a member of the government-in-exile.

The party did not contest the 2010 general elections.
