= Lairawn Baptist Association =

Baptist Christian denomination in Myanmar

Lairawn Baptist Association, Kalay Valley, Myanmar
- Lairawn Baptist Association Logo
- Classification: Evangelicalism
- Orientation: Baptist
- President: Rev. Khaw Lian Hre
- Origin: 01 March 1990; Founded Place - Haikhawl Baptist Church, Myanmar
- Separated from: Kalay Valley Baptist Association
- Congregations: 62 Churches (2014)
- Members: 21,305

Lairawn Baptist Association (LBA) is a Baptist Christian denomination throughout Kalay Valley, Sagaing Division, Myanmar. The LBA mainly serves the Chin people who speak Falam dialect. It is one of the twenty eight associations of Chin Baptist Convention which is under the umbrella of Myanmar Baptist Convention (MBC). As of 2015, the association has 78 pastors and 21305 members . The association is divided into 12 areas and each area has their own by-law and constitution, but they work together with each other in unity in the context of LBA, encouraging and resourcing each other.

== Background ==
Baptist Churches were also established independently in the area as early as 1952. The then Baptist Church pastors saw the need of an association to uplift their moral and spiritual supports. Thus, they formed the Kalay Valley Baptist Association (KVBA) for all of the Baptist churches in the area, regardless of the languages. Since, there were many different dialect within the KVBA, Burmese language were used for Church services. All of the Baptist churches in the area were under the KVBA until 1989.

Lairawn also known as Kalay Valley

As more Chin people migrated and the community grew stronger, the people wanted to worship in their own dialect. The villages which the Falam people live during 1945–1955 in Kalaymyo are Thiamthi, Angteng, Vanbaal, Pamunchaung, Chaungkhuah, Myaungsone, Myaunghlah, Cicai, Sentaw, Tuanchaung, Sadaw, Cekan, Taungphila, Tahan, Hmunlai and Pinkhung. At this time, Falam people have affiliation with Falam Baptist Association.

As there are many different dialects among the Chin i.e. Falam, Hakha, Tedim etc... several associations were formed on the basis of their particular dialect. In 1990, the people who use Falam dialect broke away from the Kalay Valley Baptist Association (KVBA) and formed Lairawn Baptist Association (LBA). Hakha formed their own association called Chin Baptist Association and the KVBA remains as it was but its member were mainly Tedim dialect speakers. The LBA has just celebrated its Silver Jubilee in 2015.

== The Formation of LBA ==
=== Christian History in Chin Hills and Kalay Valley ===
The Kingdom of Burma fell under the British Empire in AD 1885. The whole Chin State also conquered by the British in AD 1890. From the beginning of 1889, the American Baptist International Ministries and Karen Evangelists came to Chin Hills to start a Christian mission. As a result, the Chin people became Christians and are growing by the tireless effort of the missionaries. When the Chin people started to migrate into Kalay Valley, the established Baptist churches independently.

=== The Formation of KVBA ===
In 1952, pastor Thuam Khan Do was sent by Tedim Baptist Association to be a minister for the Chin army in Kalay valley. At that time, Pastor Ir Lian was at Taungphila, Pastor Ngo Kam was at Thing Unau, Pastor Hrin Cung Nung was at Pyinkhonegyi, Pastor Za Kheng was at Myaungsone, and they were visiting the churches around the villages in Kalaymyo. Rev. S.T Haugo M.R.E class of 1950 from Eastern Baptist Theological Seminary, Philadelphia, Penn USA advised Rev. Thuam Khan Do "You, Tedim people, Falam people, Hakha people, who live at Kalay valley, should be forming an association. We are different, but we are one body in Christ. You, Kalay Valley, will be the strongest in that way". Rev. Thuam Khan Do then invited the churches from the area and they agreed to form an Association. Therefore, Rev. Thuam Khan Do was called the Founding Father of the association.

The Baptist churches from Chin State were affiliated with the Baptist churches from Kalay valley, Kalamyo area. Because of existing some difficult relationship with Chin State, the meeting was set up at Taungphila Baptist on January 16, 1955 for regarding to form a new association by the advice of some reliable thinkers. And then, the Chin people from the area had decided to have an association. The association consisted of the churches from Taungphila, Thing Unau, Pinkhung, Kalaymyo, Myaungsone, Cicai, Sentaw, and Varpi. The association is named as Kalay Valley Baptist Association. Most churches were administered by KVBA until 1989.

=== The birth of Lairawn Baptist Association (LBA) ===
In the late 1980s, the Falam people from Kalay Valley Baptist Association arranged to have their own association. They thought that they would have their own Bible, Hymnal books, and Sunday School lessons if they could have their own association. During the Falam Chin Literature annual meeting at Pinkhung Baptist Church on 5 April 1989, the Association Commission was formed. The Commission held a mass meeting at Haikhawl Baptist Church on 22 December 1989 to discuss the formation of a new association. Two delegates from each Baptist church in the area and all pastors were invited to the meeting. There, they agreed to form a new association called Lairawn Baptist Association. U Mang Kulh offered his house rent free for the association office for one year. The open ceremony of the office, U Mang Kulh's house, was held on March 1, 1990. Today, Lairawn Baptist Association has 62 churches in the Kalay Valley and its area is divided into 12 Areas.

LBA HQ in Kalaymyo, Myanmar

== The Founding of Bethel Theological Seminary (BTS) ==
The history of BTS and LBA cannot be separated. The BTS was founded by Rev. Billy Saw Ling and Dr. Za Hlei Thang. The idea of founding a seminary was envisioned anew by Rev. Billy Saw Ling. He discussed his vision with Rev. En Thang on the morning of 1 April 1989 which was the starting point of BTS. The matter was further discussed on 4 April 1989 at Pyinkhonekyi Baptist Church, during the annual meeting of Falam Chin Christian Literature Society. Then, a further meeting was held at Falam Chin Christian Literature Society office, Tahan-Kalaymyo on the first week of April 1989. The meeting was attended by Rev. Bil Saw Ling, Rev. Hrang Cung Nung, Rev. Bernard Luai Hre, and Rev. L. Sang Hlei Khuai and they decided to establish a Seminary. Dr. Za Hlei Thang offered his real estate in Tahan-Kalaymyo for Seminary. The proposal for the establishment of a seminary was put to a vote and passed unanimously, and Bethel Theological Seminary (BTS) was chosen as the official name. Thus, the Seminary was opened on June 13, 1989 with twenty-six students and five teachers (Five faculty members).

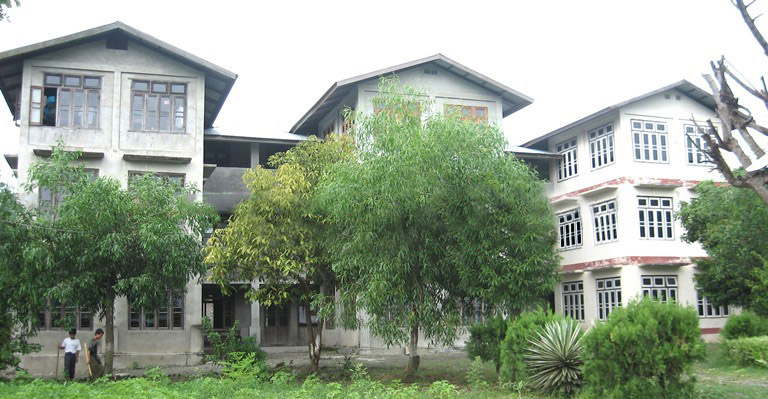
BTS Main Building

Bethel Theological Seminary started a program of Theological studies at the Diploma level in 1989, Bachelor of Theology (B.Th program) in 1992, Master level, Master of Theology in 2007, and Master level Master of Divinity program in 2010 with English as a medium of instruction. Bethel Theological Seminary becomes one of accredited member Institution of the Association for Theological Education in South East Asia (ATESEA) in 2000. In 2011, the Seminary was re-accredited by the ATESEA. The owner of the Bethel Theological Seminary is the Lairawn Baptist Association.

== The 12 Areas of LBA ==
The Lairawn Baptist Association was divided into 12 Areas as follows.

1. Angteng Pastor Area 2. Cicai Pastor Area 3. Kalaymyo Baptist Churches Area 4. Nanchaung Pastor Area 5. Kanaan Pastor Area 6. Khampat Baptist Pastor Area 7. Letpanchaung Area Baptist Churches 8. Tanphu Pastor Area 9. Taungphila Pastor Area 10. Myaungsone Baptist Pastor Area 11. Pynkhongyi Pastor Area 12. Local Churches (Tamu Zidan-7, Tamu Zidan-10, Khawhmunnuam and Htantapin)

All of the above are located within the Kalay Valley.

== The List of Former Leaders in Lairawn Baptist Association ==
=== 1990 – 1993 Officers and Staffs ===
President: Rev.R Tha Bik
Vice President: Pa Saw Hmun
General Secretary: Rev.Lian Khaw Thang
Associate General Secretary: Rev. Biak Cung Nung
Treasurer: U Ngun Nei Sawn
Asst. Treasurer: U Biak Lian Thang
CE Secretary: Rev. Than Rap
Youth Secretary: Rev. Lian Mang
E&M Secretary: Rev. Tha Nei Thang
Woman Secretary: Sayama Van Dim

=== 1994-’97 Officers and Staffs ===
President : Rev.Lian Khaw Thang Vice President : U Khuang Lian Thang General Secretary : Rev.Dr.Hrang Cung Nung Woman Secretary : Pastor Nai Ciang

=== 1998-2001 Officers and Staffs ===
President : Rev.Dr.Hrang Cung Nung Vice President : Pa Khuah Ir General Secretary : Rev.R.Tha Biak Woman Secretary : Pastor Sui Hlawn Rem

=== 2002-2003 Officers and Staffs ===
President : Rev.R.Tha Biak Vice President : Pa Lian Be General Secretary : Rev. Dr.Billy Saw Ling Woman Secretary : Pastor Thiam Hlei Thluai

=== 2004-2005 Officers and Staffs ===
President : Rev.R.Tha Biak Vice President : Pa Lian Be General Secretary : Rev.Lai Lian Sum Woman Secretary : Pastor Thiam Hlei Thluai

=== 2006-2007 Officers and Staffs ===
President : Rev.Lai Lian Sum Vice President : Pa Kap Thang General Secretary : Rev.Dr.B.Luai Hre Woman Secretary : Pastor Biak Rem Par

=== 2008-2009 Officers and Staffs ===
President : Rev.Lai Lian Sum Vice President : Pa Kap Thang General Secretary : Rev.Khaw Lian Hre Woman Secretary : Pastor Biak Rem Par

=== 2010-2011 Officers and Staffs ===
President : Rev.Lian Mang Vice President : Pa Tha Hlei Thuan General Secretary : Rev.Khaw Lian Hre Woman Secretary : Pastor Thiam Hlei Thluai

=== 2012-2014 Officers and Staffs ===
President : Rev.Lian Mang Vice President : Pa Tha Hlei Thuan General Secretary : Rev.Run Herh Ling Woman Secretary : Pastor Thiam Hlei Thluai

=== 2015-2017 Officers and Staffs ===
President : Rev.Khaw Lian Hre Vice President : Pa Za Biak Thang General Secretary : Rev.Micah Bawi Ceu Woman Secretary : Pastor Khin Than Shwe
