= Party for National Democracy =

The Party for National Democracy (Burmese: အမျိုးသားဒီမိုကရေစီပါတီ; PND) was a political party in Myanmar.

== History ==
Following the reintroduction of multi-party democracy after the 8888 Uprising, the Party for National Democracy was established in 1988. It contested three seats in the 1990 general elections, receiving 0.55% of the vote and winning all three seats; Sein Win in Paukkhaung, U Soe Win in Bago 1 and U Thein Oo in Oktwin 1.

The party was banned by the military government on 20 December 1990 after it accused Sein Win of establishing a parallel government.
