= Willy Gordon =

Swedish sculptor and artist

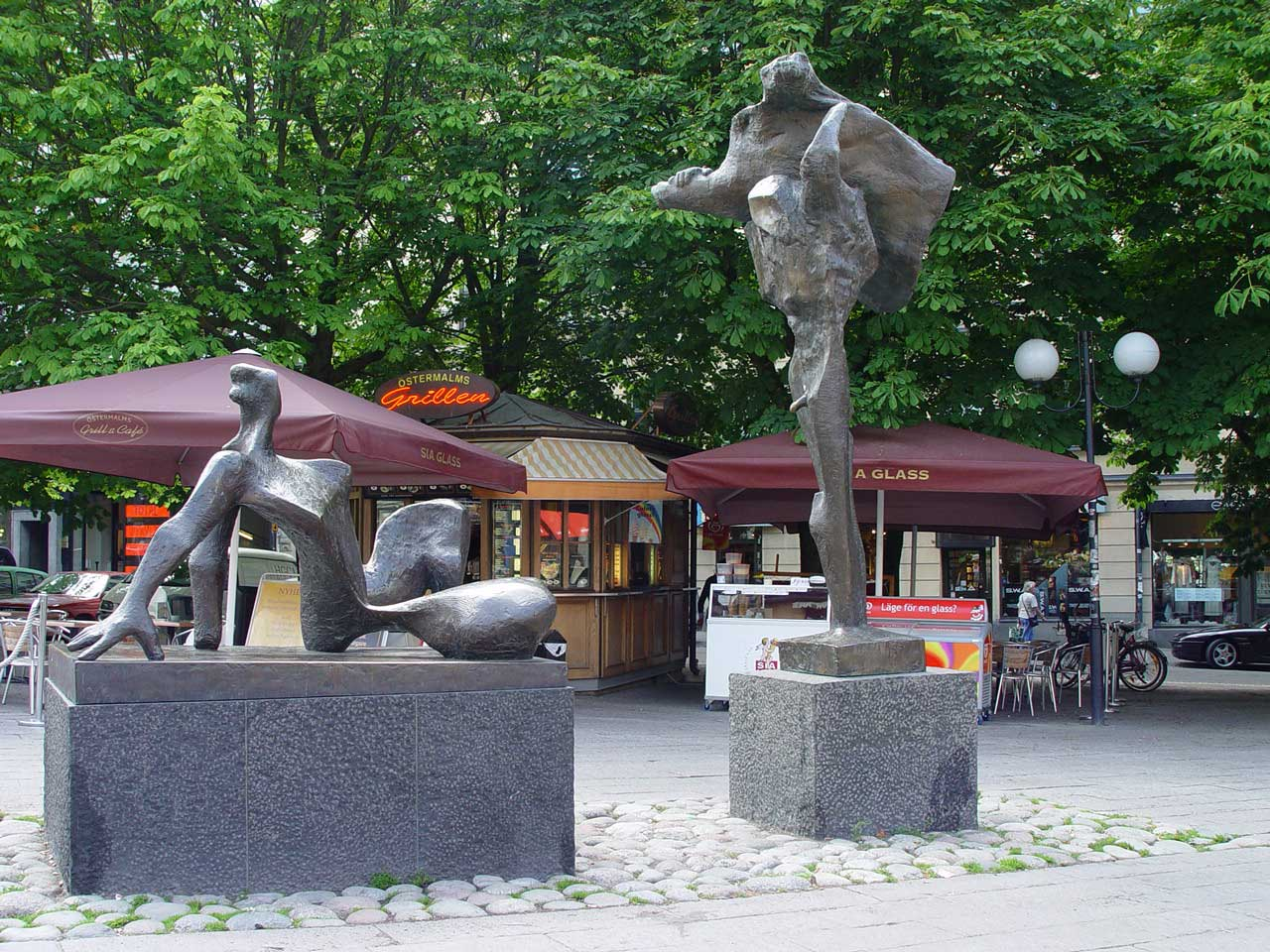
The meeting in Östermalmstorg

Willy Gordon (July 2, 1918 – July 12, 2003) was a Swedish sculptor and artist. Gordon's public artworks are displayed in a number of cities in Sweden.

== Life ==
Gordon was born at Ringen in the Russian gubernia of Courland (present day Reņģe, Ruba Parish, Saldus Municipality, Latvia) and later emigrated with his family to Malmö, Sweden when he was seven years old. He studied sculpture by Nils Sjögren, at the Royal University College of Fine Arts (Swedish: Konsthögskolan) in Stockholm and later with Ossip Zadkine in Paris.

== Art ==
=== Public sculptures ===
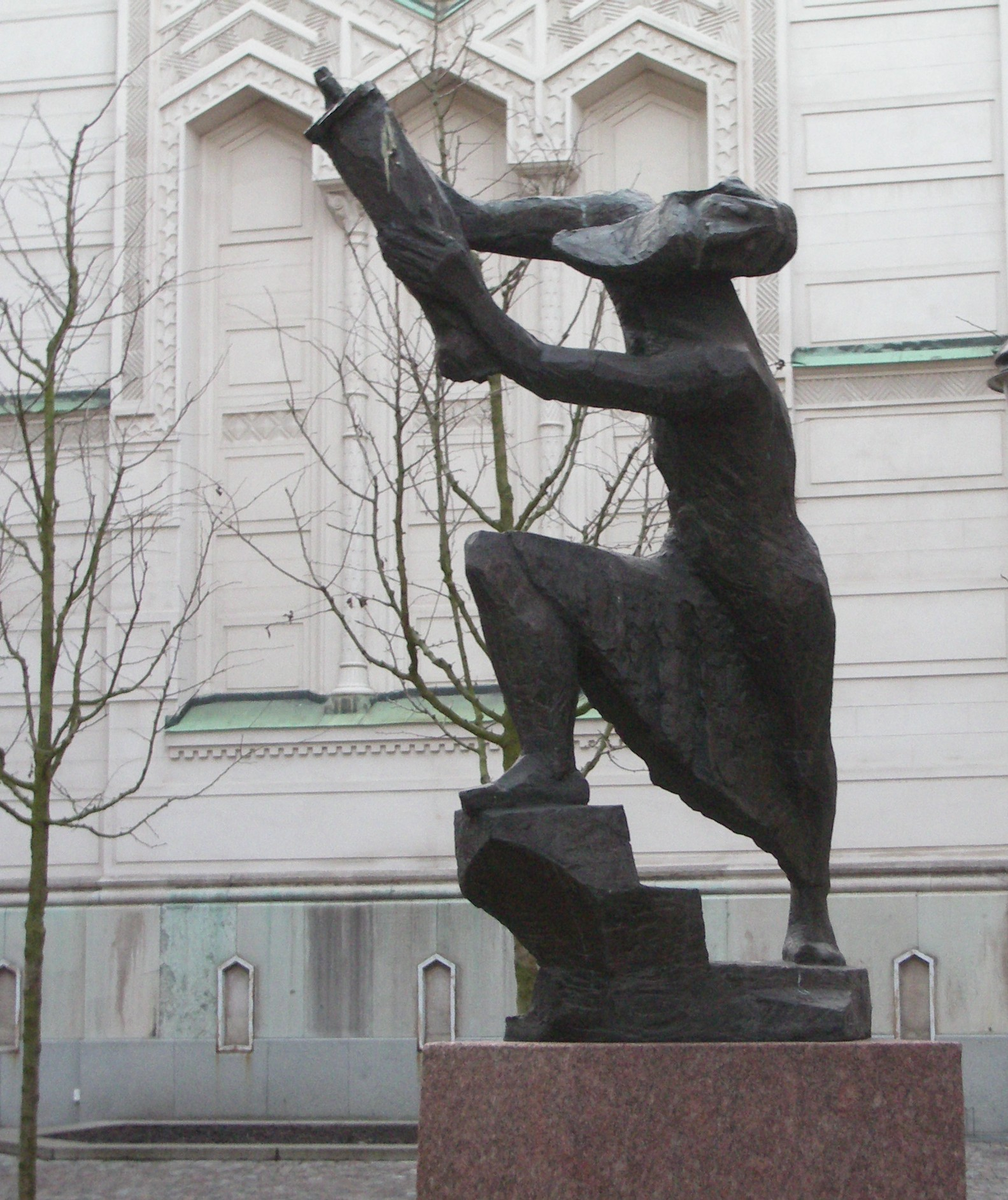
Flight with the Torah, Stockholm

Gordon was active in Stockholm for a major part of his life, and there about a dozen of his public sculptures can be found. For example, "Wives" in the Fruängen centre (1968), "Living ore" in Karlavägen street in the district of Östermalm in Stockholm, and "Flight with the Torah" outside the Great Synagogue of Stockholm.

In Malmö a monument, created by Gordon, is installed at the cemetery to commemorate all the victims of the Holocaust.

Gordon's sculpture "The meeting" (Swedish: Mötet) also known as "Man with piece of meat - lying woman" (Swedish: Man med köttstycke - liggande kvinna) is installed in Östermalmstorg square in Stockholm. It is a pair sculptures: a naked male figure bearing a piece of meat on his shoulders before a recumbent female figure. Gordon also produced "The meeting" in miniature in limited numbers. He also donated a copy to Bommersvik college in Sweden, where it is displayed in its art collection.

Many of Gordon's works such as "Mötet" are highly stylised, influenced by Zadkine and also by other sculptors such as Eric Grate and Henry Moore.

=== Portrait statues ===
He also created statues of famous people, including singer Jussi Björling that is exhibited at the Björling Museum in Borlänge, musician Evert Taube (Evert Taube playing the lute) (1990) at the Evert Taube terrace in Riddarholmen, and a sculpture of Nobel prize laureate Selma Lagerlöf called The Crystal of Pain (Swedish: Smärtans Kristall) in Farsta.

Gordon also created a monument in honour of Swedish diplomat Raoul Wallenberg on Lidingö, an island off Stockholm. Wallenberg is famous for saving tens of thousands of Hungarian Jews during The Holocaust.

=== Science ===
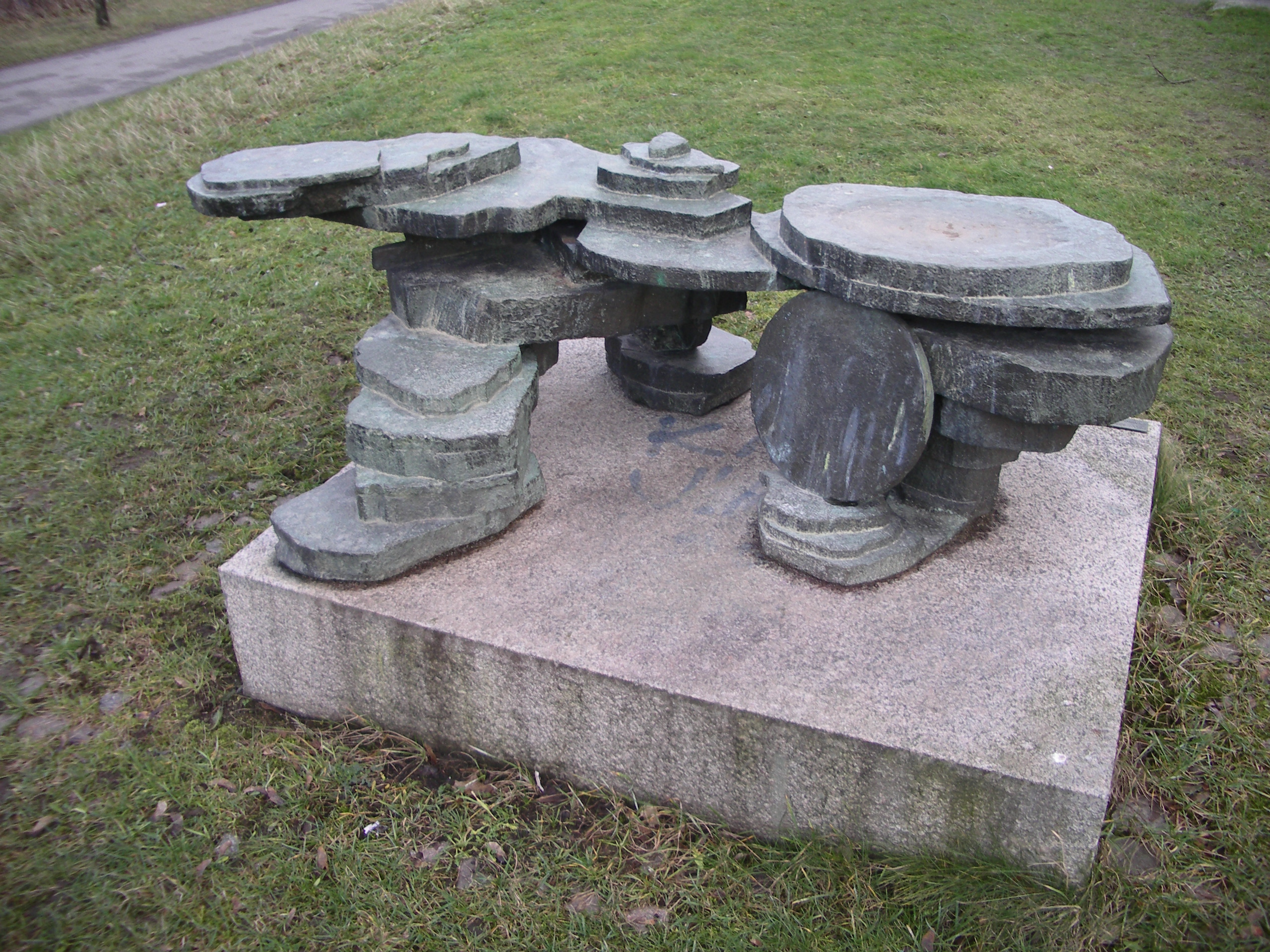
Sculpture of a protein molecule

Willy Gordon also created sculptures of a scientific motif such as crystals and molecules. For example, he created the sculpture of a protein molecule: Carrier molecule, that depicts a protein chain.

=== International recognition ===
In 1990 together with the architect Tsila Zak he won a competition for a monument in the Lithuanian capital of Vilnius for the purpose of honouring its Jewish culture. The project, The Jewish Memorial Center in Vilnius, is situated on the site of the Shulhof and the Great Synagogue of Vilna.

== Publications ==
- Willy Gordon: Willy Gordon sculpture et dessins 1941-1951, catalogue, 24 p.
- Willy Gordon (autobiography) (edited by June Rose; designed by Willy's wife Mona Gordon), Meta Bokproduktion, 112 p. chiefly ill., ports. 21 x 21 cm. c1976. Hebrew University SYSNO: 2220000.
- Gordon, W. (1976). Willy Gordon. Järna: Meta Bokproduktion, ISBN 91-85522-00-7
