= Chair of Elijah =

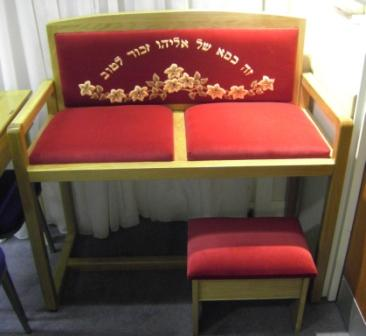
Elijah's Chair used during the circumcision ceremony

Chair of Elijah (or Elijah's chair) is a special unoccupied chair that is reserved during the Jewish ceremony of circumcision Brit milah, which according to tradition, is used by the prophet Elijah who participates in every such ceremony. Various customs and virtues have been attributed in relation to the chair's preparation.
