= Östermalmstorg =

Square in Östermalm, Stockholm, Sweden

Coordinates: 59°20′09″N 18°04′45″E

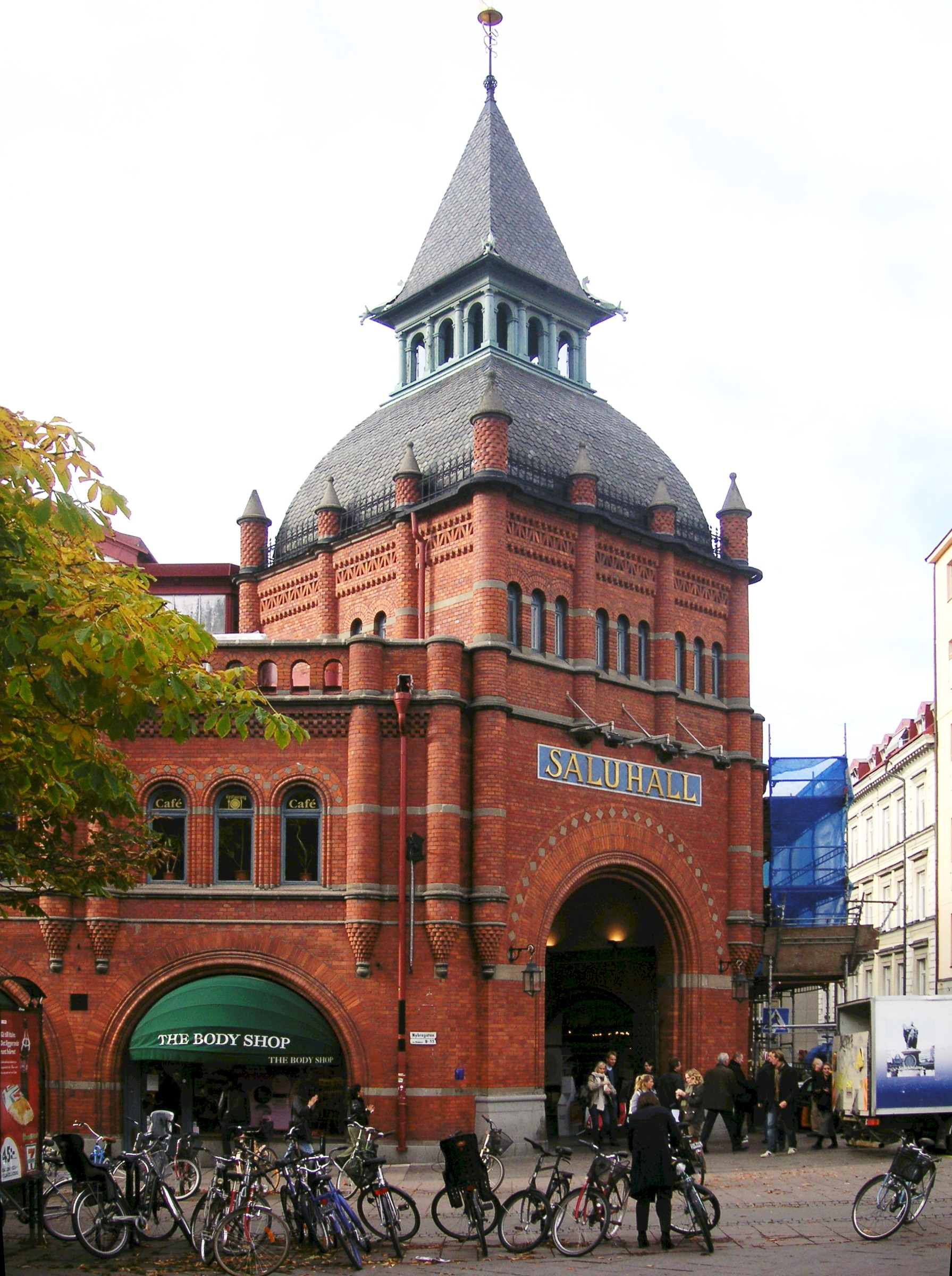
Östermalmshallen

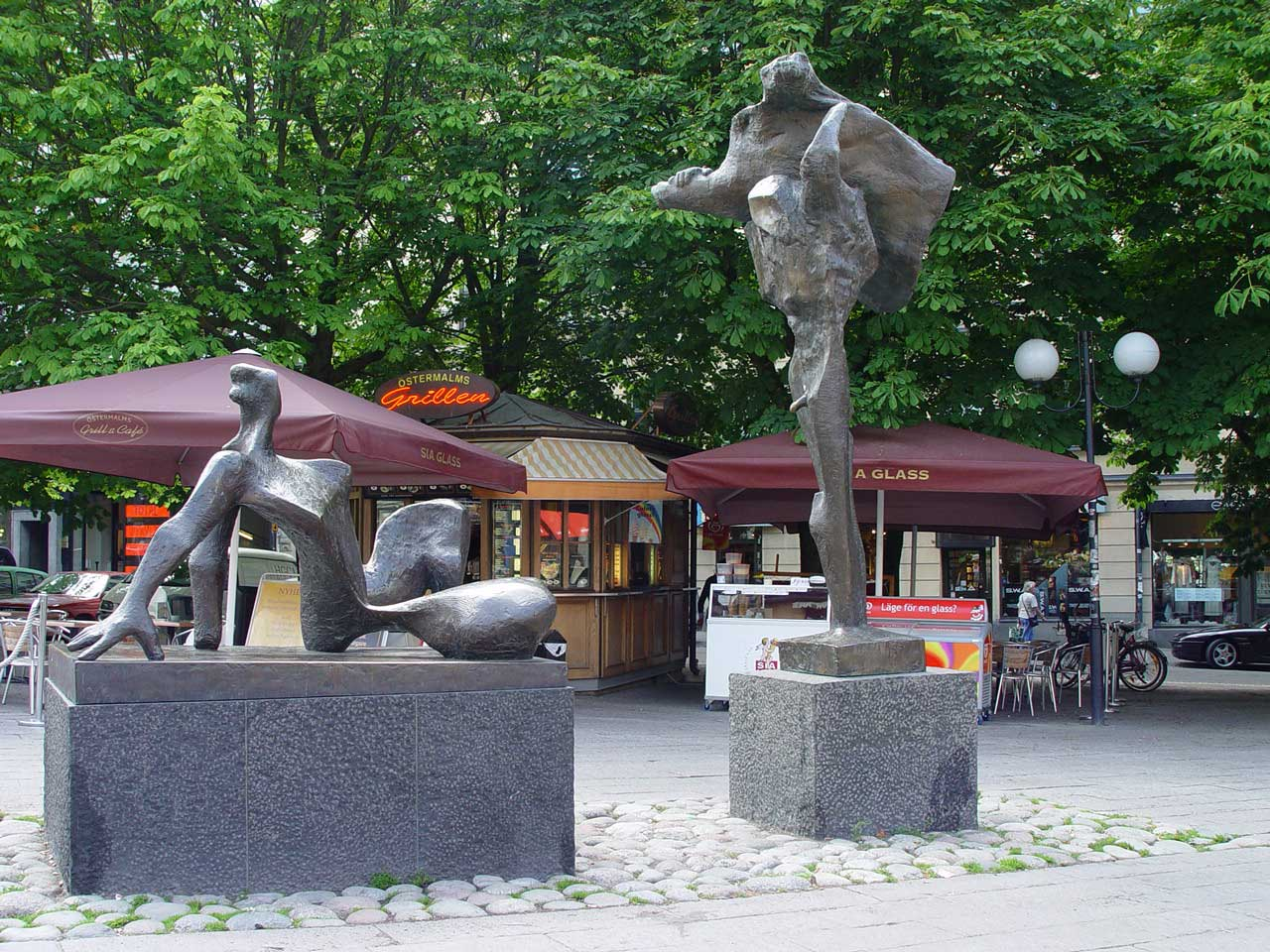
"Möte" by Willy Gordon

Östermalmstorg is a square in the district of Östermalm, in Stockholm, Sweden.

It is known principal for Östermalm Market Hall (Östermalmshallen) which first opened in 1889. Östermalmshallen's interior is a marketplace for food and related delicacies. Östermalmstorg was also the location of the first Åhléns department store which opened in 1932.

Next to the square stands the statue of The Meeting (Swedish: "Möte"), showing a naked male figure bearing a piece of meat on his shoulders before a recumbent female figure, created by the artist Willy Gordon (1918–2003).

== See also ==
- Östermalmstorg metro station
