= National Council of the Union of Burma =

Opposition organisation in Burma

Logo of the National Council of the Union of Burma

The National Council of the Union of Burma (Burmese: ပြည်ထောင်စုမြန်မာနိုင်ငံအမျိုးသားကောင်စီ; pronounced [pjìdàʊɰ̃zṵ mjəmà nàɪɰ̃ŋàɰ̃ əmjóðá kàʊɰ̃sì]) was an opposition organisation in Myanmar (Burma), composed of representatives of exiled political and ethnic groups. The organisation was formed on 22 September 1992 and aimed to achieve a democratic federal system in Burma.
