= Sein Win (politician, born 1944) =

Burmese politician (1944–2026)

Dr Sein Win
- စိန်ဝင်း
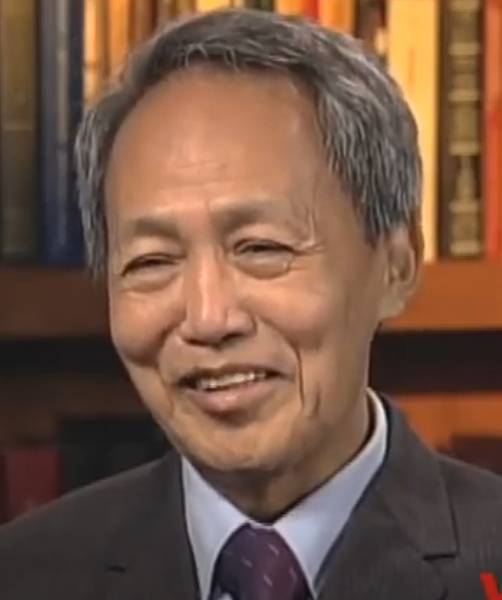
- Sein Win in 2012

Prime Minister of the National Coalition Government of the Union of Burma
- In office 18 December 1990 – 14 September 2012
- Preceded by: Office established
- Succeeded by: Office abolished

Personal details
- Born: 16 December 1944 Taungdwingyi, Magway Division, Japanese-occupied Burma
- Died: 6 February 2026 (aged 81) Bethesda, Maryland, U.S.
- Party: National Coalition Government of the Union of Burma
- Parent(s): Ba Win (father); Khin Saw (mother)
- Relatives: Aung San (uncle); Aung San Oo (cousin); Aung San Suu Kyi (cousin)
- Education: Hamburg University; University of Rangoon
- Profession: former Chairman of National Coalition Government of the Union of Burma

Sein Win (Burmese: စိန်ဝင်း, pronounced [sèiɰ̃ wɪ́ɰ̃]; 16 December 1944 – 6 February 2026) was a Burmese politician, who served as Chairman of the National Coalition Government of the Union of Burma, a "government in exile". He was made unofficial Prime Minister of the Union of Burma, on being elected by the 1990 People's Assembly known as the National Coalition Government of the Union of Burma, a former government-in-exile.

== Life and career ==
Sein Win was born on 16 December 1944 in Taungdwingyi, Magway District, Burma; he was son of Ba Win and Khin Saw. His father Ba Win, was the elder brother of General Aung San and was part of the cabinet of Aung San. Ba Win was assassinated in 1947, together with Aung San and most of the members of the cabinet, just before Burma gained independence.

Sein Win received his Bachelor of Science (Hons) degree in mathematics from the University of Rangoon in 1966. He received a diploma in mathematics in 1974, and a Doctorate of Science (Doctor rerum naturalium) from Hamburg University in Germany. He served as a tutor at Rangoon University up to his scholarship to Hamburg University and lecturer at the University of Colombo in Sri Lanka from 1980 to 1981 and at Nairobi University in Kenya from 1982 to 1984.

In the 1990 General Election in Myanmar, Sein Win ran for and won a seat representing Paukkaung Township in the Bago Region, under the National League for Democracy party label. However, as the military junta refused to recognize the results of the elections, Sein Win and other electoral winners fled towards the Myanmar-Thailand border, forming the National Coalition Government for the Union of Burma, and appointing him its first Prime Minister.

Sein Win died at Suburban Hospital in Bethesda, Maryland, on 6 February 2026, at the age of 81.

== Sources ==
- Recordings and Photos of the Prime Minister's visit to the College Historical Society on behalf of his cousin Aung San Suu Kyi in October 2007.
