= Evangelical Church of Maraland =

Christian denomination in India

Evangelical Church of Maraland is a church in southern Mizoram in northeast India. It was founded by English missionary Reverend and Mr Reginald Arthur Lorrain (brother of missionary James Herbert Lorrain) in 1907. It is the largest church among the Mara people. It is one of the three Mizoram churches pioneered by English missionaries in the 19th century; others are Mizoram Presbyterian Church and Baptist Church of Mizoram.

== History ==
Prior to his arrival in British India, the Rev. Reginald Arthur Lorrain founded Lakher Pioneer Mission in 1905 in London. Two years later he arrived in Saikao (also known as Serkawr), a sleepy town in Siaha district of Mizoram. The church began as an Independent Church of Maraland (ICM) which later split into the Evangelical Church of Maraland, India ECMI and Congregational Church in India (Maraland); his ministry oversaw all the Mara-inhabited areas of British India that included Mara people in western Myanmar, which now function as a separate church under the name of Mara Evangelical Church after the partition of India in 1947.

The church held a series of celebrations for the 100th year of the Gospel to the Mara people and land in September (26 September 2007) and November 2007.

Rev. S.T. Zawsi is the present moderator of the Synod of the Evangelical Church of Maraland.

== Association/membership ==
The Evangelical Church of Maraland (India) is a member of

- World Communion of Reformed Churches
- India Evangelical Mission
- All India Sunday School Union

The church had more than 30,000 members and 74 congregations in 2004. It also has a partnership with Mara Evangelical Church in Myanmar.

== Name ==
The Evangelical Church of Maraland (India) continues to use the word "Maraland" signifying the un-administered part of the world. Maraland was not part of any country until the British conquered the area inhabited by the Mara people in 1922, whereas the church was already founded in 1907.

== Theologians holding doctorate degrees ==
- Rev. Dr. T. Laikai, D.D (Senate of Serampore University, India), 2004.
- Rev. Dr. M. Zakonia, D.Min (United Theological Open University, India), 2002.
- Rev. Dr. Laiu Fachhai, D.Th (Stellenbosch University, South Africa), 2007.
- Rev. Dr. S.T. Zawsi, D.Min (University of Jerusalem, India), 2012.
- Rev. Dr. Setha Solo,

== See also ==
- Evangelical Church of Maraland (ECMI) Entry at MaraChristian.net
- Council of Baptist Churches in Northeast India
- List of Christian denominations in North East India
