= Together for Sustainable Development =

Non-governmental organization in Myanmar

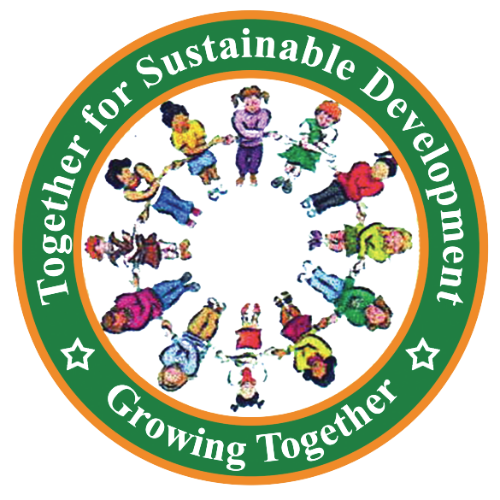
- Abbreviation: TSD
- Formation: 2017
- Type: Non-governmental organization
- Legal status: Active
- Headquarters: Lialaipi, Chin State, Myanmar
- Location: Myanmar
- Region served: Myanmar
- Services: Sustainable development, education, food security, humanitarian assistance
- Fields: Education, food security, inclusion, disaster risk reduction, humanitarian relief
- Website: www.tsdmyanmar.org

Together for Sustainable Development (TSD) is a Myanmar-based non-governmental organization headquartered in Lailenpi, in the Mara region of southern Chin State. Founded in 2017, it works primarily with Mara communities and neighbouring communities through programmes in education, food security, inclusion, disaster risk reduction, and humanitarian relief.

== History ==
The origins of Together for Sustainable Development date to 2003, when Rev. Mai Ki, described by the organization as the first woman pastor in the Maraland, joined the Service and Development Department of the Mara Evangelical Church with the vision of leading her community "to be Blessing for Others" by expanding educational opportunities for children.

Together with a small team of volunteers, she initiated community development activities including rural road construction, installation of community rice mills, women's self-help groups, and educational programmes. These activities gradually evolved into TSD.

In 2017, the organization became an independent non-governmental organization, separate from the Mara Evangelical Church, while continuing to collaborate with churches, community organizations, and international partners.

== Programmes ==
TSD organizes its work into four programme areas:

The organization supports access to education, teacher development, community learning initiatives, and continuing education programmes for children and adults in rural communities.

TSD works with farming communities to promote sustainable agriculture, climate-resilient farming methods, and livelihood development.

The organization supports women's self-help groups, disability inclusion, and community capacity-building programmes intended to increase participation among marginalized groups.

TSD conducts disaster preparedness activities, supports community disaster committees, and provides humanitarian assistance during emergencies affecting communities in Chin State.

== Organization ==
TSD is headquartered in Lailenpi, Chin State, and also maintains offices in Yangon and Sabawngpi. According to the organization, its staff are recruited primarily from communities throughout the Mara region, with an emphasis on gender balance and inclusion of persons with disabilities.

The organization describes itself as a Christian faith-based organization guided by the values of love and sharing, equality and justice, and accountability and transparency.

== Partnerships ==
According to TSD, it collaborates with community organizations and international partners, including:

- Mara Self-Help Group Federation
- Mara Evangelical Church
- Mara Students Association
- Mara Chano Py (Mara Women Organization)
- Mara Thyutlia Py (Mara Youth Organization)
- Lisu Theological Seminary
- Bread for the World
- Hildesheim Blind Mission
- Diakonie Katastrophenhilfe
- Mission East

== Impact ==
According to statistics published by the organization, TSD's programmes have supported:

- more than 2,870 students through education programmes;
- 253 farmers adopting sustainable agricultural methods;
- 750 women participating in self-help groups;
- 13 communities establishing disaster preparedness committees; and
- more than 3,000 people receiving humanitarian assistance.
