= Lutuv language =

Burmese language

Lutuv (Lautu)
- Region: Burma
- Native speakers: 18,000 (2005)
- Language family: Sino-Tibetan: (Tibeto-Burman); Kuki-Chin; Maraic; Lutuv (Lautu)

Language codes
- ISO 639-3: clt
- Glottolog: laut1236

Lutuv, widely known as Lautu Chin, is a Kuki-Chin language spoken in 16 villages in Matupi townships, Thantlang townships and Hakha townships, Chin State, Myanmar. The Lutuv Chin language share 90%–97% lexical similarity. Lutuv Chin has 87%–94% lexical similarity with Mara Chin, 82%–85% with Zophe Chin, 80%–86% with Senthang Chin. A written script for Lutuv was created in 1960 by Rev. Fr. Andre Bareights and Michael Mg. Hre Hmung.

The Chin Languages Research Project with Lutuv translator Siy Hne Paa (Sui Hnem Par) have provided translations of ten short books into Lutuv. The Chin Languages Research Project has also a YouTube Channel.

== Distribution ==
Lutuv is spoken in the following villages: Hnaring- Hnaring Town, Khyhraw-(Khuahrang), Thaw-aw-(Thang-Aw), Aasaw-(Fanthen), Chuonge-(Surngen) Tyise-(Tisen), Setung-(Sentung), Hrepuv-(Hriangpi), Saata - (Saate), Lungkyi - (Leikang), Lawthuotluo - (Longthantlang), Zingmaa - (Zuamang) Capaw - (Capaw), Pangtie - (Pintia), La-uu- (La-uu), Lyipuv - (Leipi)
