= Lialaipi =

Town in Chin State, Myanmar

Lialaipi လိုင်လင်းပီ Lailenpi
- Town
- Lailenpi
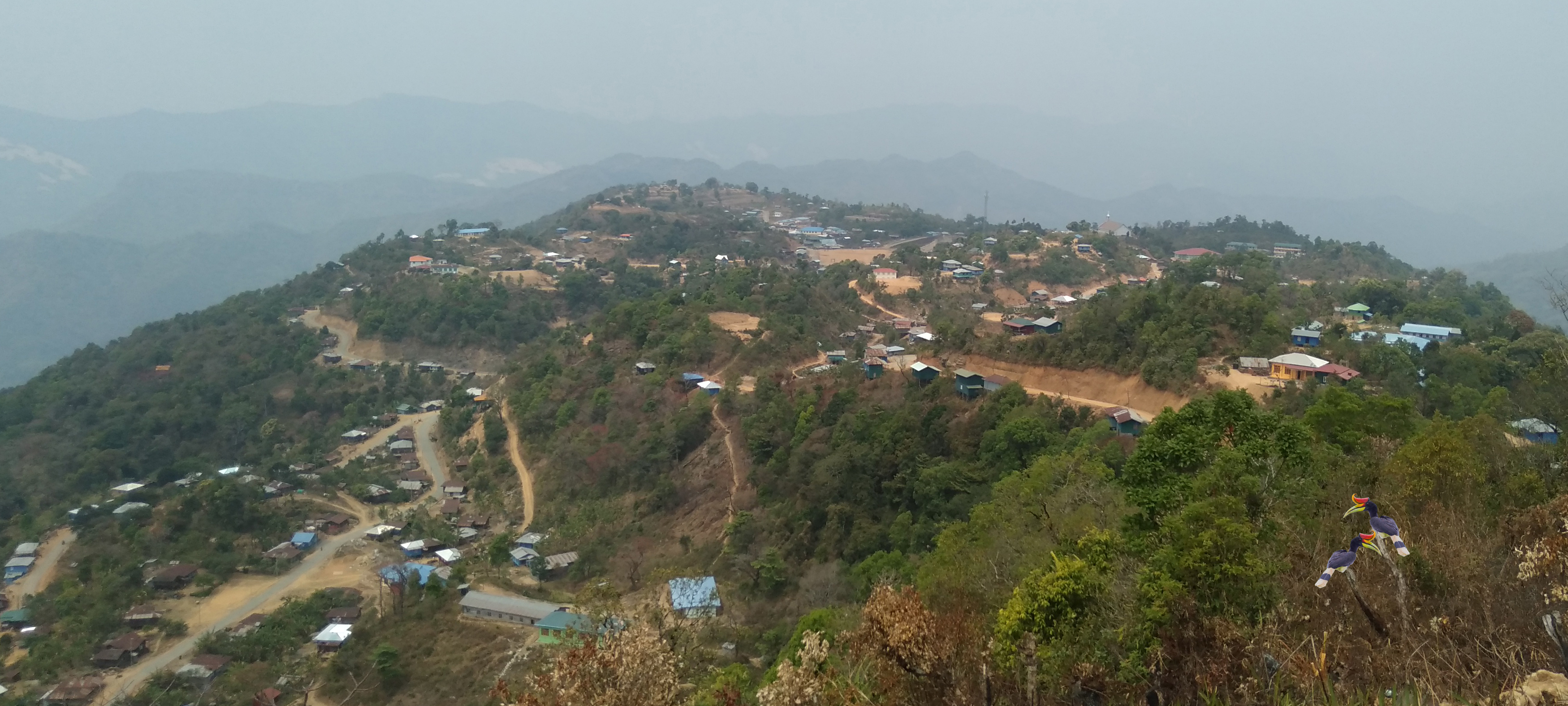

- Location in Myanmar
- Coordinates: 21.9592°N 93.1143°E
- Country: Myanmar
- State: Chin State
- District: Matupi District
- Township: Matupi Township
- Time zone: UTC+06:30 (Myanmar Standard Time)

Lialaipi (Mara Chin: Lialaipi; Burmese: လိုင်လင်းပီ, commonly rendered in English as Lailenpi) is a town in Matupi Township, Chin State, Myanmar. It is the principal town of the Mara people and serves as the administrative, educational, religious and commercial centre of the Mara region in southern Chin State. The town is one of the Assembly headquarters of the Mara Evangelical Church (MEC). It also functions as the principal service centre for the surrounding Mara villages.

== History ==
Lialaipi was established as a township subdivision in 1967 during the administration of the Revolutionary Council by grouping together Mara village tracts for administrative purposes. The township subdivision was abolished during the 1974 administrative reforms and the area reverted to village tract status.

On 11 February 2016, the Pyidaungsu Hluttaw approved the establishment of Lailenpi as a town. Under Notification No. 400/2016 issued by the Ministry of Home Affairs on 21 March 2016, Lailenpi Village Tract was officially designated as a town.

=== Origin ===
According to Mara oral tradition, the ancestors of the Lailen clan originated from Loilyn near present-day Sunthla village in Falam Township. Following a cholera epidemic during the thirteenth century, they migrated southwards through present-day Hakha Township and Thantlang Township before settling at the present site after the seventeenth century. The settlement has existed for more than three centuries.

== Etymology ==
The Mara name Lialaipi derives from the Lailen clan. In the Mara language, pi means "great" or "largest". After several daughter villages were established from the original settlement, the principal village became known as Lialaipi ("Greater Lailen").

== Geography ==
Lialaipi is situated in the mountainous highlands of southern Chin State within Matupi Township, close to the border with India. The surrounding administrative area covers approximately 1,445 square kilometres (558 sq mi), while the town itself occupies about 6 square miles (16 km^{2}).

== Administration ==
Lialaipi serves as the administrative centre for the surrounding Mara village tracts within Matupi Township. Government offices, schools and public services serving the southern part of the township are located in the town.

== Transport ==
Lialaipi is one of the most remote towns in Myanmar. Road access is frequently disrupted during the rainy season because of steep terrain and landslides.

To improve accessibility, the Government of Myanmar approved the construction of the Lailenpi Airstrip under Union Government decision No. 12/2017. The project, funded by Mission Aviation Fellowship (MAF), began in May 2019 to improve access to healthcare, humanitarian assistance, education and community development in southern Chin State. The airstrip is designed to accommodate Caravan Cessna aircraft.

== Economy ==
Agriculture is the principal occupation of the inhabitants. Local livelihoods depend on shifting cultivation, livestock farming and the cultivation of citrus fruits, pineapples, lemons and sesame. Mithun (Bos frontalis) husbandry is also an important component of the local economy.

Mission East has implemented programmes in the Lialaipi area supporting sustainable agriculture, food security, nutrition and community development in partnership with local organisations.

== Demographics ==
The population consists predominantly of the Mara people. According to local administrative statistics, the town had a population of 2,418 people living in 530 households in 2018.

== Education ==
Formal education began with the establishment of a primary school in 1942, followed by a middle school in 1956 and a high school in 1992. Since 2010, Lialaipi has served as a matriculation examination centre for the surrounding region.

The town is also home to the Centre of Maraland Education (COME), operated by the Mara Evangelical Church with support from international partners.

== Healthcare ==
A rural health centre was established in 1956 and upgraded to a station hospital in 1990. Because of the mountainous terrain and remoteness of the region, access to specialised healthcare remains limited. The construction of the Lailenpi Airstrip is expected to improve emergency medical transport and humanitarian access.

== Religion ==
Christianity is the predominant religion in Lialaipi. The town serves as one of the principal religious centres of the Mara people and hosts one of the Assembly headquarters of the Mara Evangelical Church. Following the reunification of the Mara Independent Evangelical Church and the Mara Independent Church in 1987, the MEC established Assembly offices at Lialaipi and Sabawngpi.

== Myanmar civil war ==
During the Myanmar civil war (2021–present), Lialaipi became the site of fighting between resistance forces and the Myanmar military. The conflict disrupted transportation, education and humanitarian access in the surrounding area, resulting in civilian displacement.
