= Rezua =

Rezua ရေဇွာမြို့
- Town
- Rezua
- Location within Myanmar
- Coordinates: 22°03′10″N 93°24′31″E
- Country: Myanmar
- State: Chin State
- District: Zotung District
- Township: Rezua Township

Population (2014)
  - Town: 12,265
  - Urban: 2,229
  - Rural: 10,036
- Time zone: UTC+6:30 (MST)

Rezua (Burmese: ရေဇွာ; also spelt Razua) is a town located in Matupi District of Chin State, Myanmar (Burma). The name Rezua comes from the name Razawh after the (Rezua Bawi) chief of Rezua clan moved their village from Arphaephu Chia to the present location. It is 6,000 feet (1,800 m) above sea level, located in the central part of Chin State.

== History ==
The Zotung people are one of the tribe groups in Chin State. The Zotungs are a distinct tribe of people in Myanmar. It is difficult to get historical records of these people as they didn't have a written language until the colonial period. However, their genealogy can be traced back as far as the year 1300 AD, as there are names of the places and traditional songs that reveal the time they were founded and composed. They use oral-based tradition to spread knowledge, although they are known to have drawn arts. These people are a part of the Zo people. These people called themselves Zo/Zohae (Zo/Zo plural) from time immemorial. In 1931, their language was recorded using the Roman alphabet by Hriabawi Khuamin. It is called the Zoccaw (Zo Script). Most prefer hunting animals for their meals like other Kuki-Chin peoples, while some have settled for farming. Before Western influence, the Zos believed in Pachia and Khozing as their guardian gods and prayed to them for their health, wealth, and safety from demons of the forests through Khuarum services. When western missionaries entered Chinland, the Zo people converted to Christianity and currently the vast majority of them belong to various denominations of Christianity.

Rezua has been a township since 2003. In the area of Rezua township, there are many villages tied to the township. Maraland, Lautu and various other tribes are also present.

On 29 November 2023, during the civil war in Myanmar, Chinland Defence Force units, alongside the Chin National Army, captured Rezua from the Tatmadaw military junta.
