= Darling, Chin State =

Darling or Dawlei
- Location in Burma
- Coordinates: 22°20′N 93°12′E
- Country: Burma
- State: Chin State
- District: Mindat District
- Township: Matupi Township

Area
  - Total: 3.50 sq mi (9.1 km^{2})
- Elevation: 6,125 ft (1,867 m)

Population (1997)
  - Total: 650
  - Density: 190/sq mi (72/km^{2})
  - Religions: Christian
- Time zone: UTC+6:30 (MST)

Darling or Dawlei is a Mara village in Matupi township of Chin State in western part of Myanmar (previously known as Burma). Locally, the natives called it Dawlei, but its transliteration in Hakha dialect is Darling.

== Demographics ==
In 1997, Darling had a population of 650. The village is inhabited by ethnic Mara people, who form a distinct ethnic group inhabiting a contiguous 61 villages around the area.

== Religion ==
With the arrival of missionaries to Mara people, Rev. & Mrs. R.A. Lorrain to Maraland on 26 September 1907, the people of Darling are now largely Christians. The majority of them belong to Mara Evangelical Church in Myanmar, founded by the missionaries. Christianity plays an important role in shaping their lives and especially in the field education, which is vital to the development of the people.

== Education ==
Darling has a middle school. Although a small village, Darling is known for producing many educated Maras in Myanmar.

== Related links ==
- Maraland.net: The home of Mara people on the internet
- Maraland.org
