= Mara Thyutlia Py =

- Abbreviation: MTP
- Formation: 1954
- Type: Voluntary association
- Legal status: Active Indian society
- Purpose: Heritage conservation Conservation of nature Charitable services
- Headquarters: Siaha, Mizoram
- Region served: Northeast India
- Services: Social work Community service
- Members: Any Mara above 14 years
- Official language: Mara
- President: Pakhaw Choza

Mara Thyutlia Py (MTP) is the largest Non-governmental Organisation in Maraland, Mizoram state, India. Mara Thyutlia Py literally means Mara Young Organisation/Association. It has its headquarters at Siaha - the capital of Mara Autonomous District Council. It draws members across Maraland from the age group of teen age to late 40s.

== Related links ==
- Maraland.NET: The home of the Mara People
- Mara portal in English
- Siaha Online website
