= Sasa (politician) =

Burmese politician of Chin descent

- Taisa ဆာဆာ
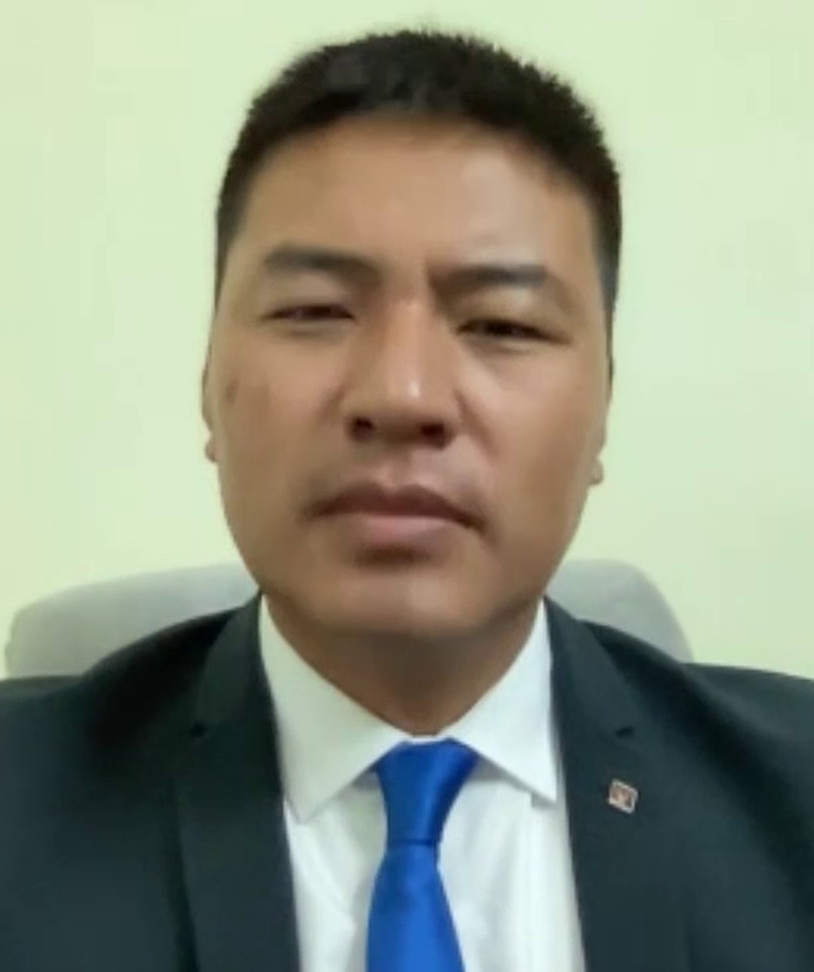
- Sasa in 2021

CRPH's Special Envoy to the United Nations
- In office 22 February 2021 – 16 April 2021

Minister of International Cooperation of National Unity Government of Myanmar
- In office 16 April 2021 – 27 November 2025
- President: Win Myint
- Prime Minister: Mahn Win Khaing Than
- Vice President: Duwa Lashi La

Personal details
- Born: c. 1980 Lialaipi, Chin State, Myanmar
- Citizenship: Burmese
- Party: National League for Democracy
- Education: Shillong College, Yerevan State Medical University
- Occupation: Medical doctor, philanthropist and politician
- Website: www.healthandhope.org

Sasa (Burmese: ဆာဆာ; Mara: Taisa; lit. 'Higher and higher'; also known as Salai Maung Taing San), known honorifically as Dr Sasa, is a Chin medical doctor, philanthropist and civil society activist who served as the Minister of International Cooperation in the cabinet of National Unity Government. He previously served as the Special Envoy of Committee Representing Pyidaungsu Hluttaw (CRPH) to the United Nations. He is the founder of Health and Hope, a Christian health organization that works with churches to promote development in Chin State and trains villagers to become community health workers. Sasa has been recognised as one of the "Tearfund's Inspired Individuals" for his contributions in Myanmar.

== Early life and education ==
Sasa was born circa 1980s in Lailenpi Town, Matupi District, Chin State. His name, Sasa, was given by his grandmother which means 'higher and higher' in Chin tradition. After he completed his secondary education from a high school in Yangon where he had to walk for two weeks to attend, he volunteered to improve education in his hometown.

Sasa was sent to Shillong College in India with the support of his community in 1996. There he applied for a scholarship through Prospect Burma from which he met with Genette Dagtoglou who sponsored him to study medicine at Yerevan State Medical University, Armenia. He is a Christian.

== Career ==
=== Humanitarian work ===
In 2007 his final year as a medical student, Sasa brought medical help and treated over 3,500 patients in towns where famine struck, including his hometown. When he graduated in 2009, Sasa started teaching primary healthcare to villagers, and founded Health and Hope Christian organization. The region's first primary healthcare service centre, Health and Hope works with local churches to train two community health workers each from 150 villages. The organization counts Charles III among its patrons.

He also managed to construct Lailenpi airstrip, the first private airport in Chin State.

=== Politics ===
In 2020, Sasa became a leading member of the Chin State NLD's election committee for the general election. A fresh face in politics, his involvement in election campaigning in Chin State in November made him known to the wider public across Myanmar.

At midnight on 1 February 2021, he was together with Aung San Suu Kyi before the coup. He fled across the border to India and evaded the arrest of the military, pretending to be a taxi driver. It was a three-day journey to get to safety.

On 22 February 2021, he was appointed as CRPH's Special Envoy to the United Nations. A few days later, on 4 March 2021, he submitted a letter to the United Nations Security Council requesting the international body to honour its Responsibility to Protect (R2P) commitments with reference to the 2021 Myanmar protests and the violent military response to them.

On 16 April 2021, he was appointed as the Minister of International Cooperation in the cabinet of the newly formed National Unity Government by the members of CRPH.

On 27 November 2025, Sasa submitted a resignation letter to the NUG according to Prime Minister's Office spokesperson, Nay Phone Latt. Once the PMO receives the resignation letter, prime minister Mahn Winn Khaing Thann makes the decision to approve it.

== Lawsuit ==
Sasa was arrested by the Myanmar Police Force in 2021. The Dekkhina District Court issued an arrest warrant on 15 March the same year. He was charged under Section 122 (2) of the Criminal Code for high treason as he had accepted the appointment of Myanmar Representative to the United Nations by the Committee Representing Pyidaungsu Hluttaw (CRPH).
