= Zotung =

Zotung or Zotung Chin may refer to:

- Zotung people, an ethnic group in Chin State, Myanmar
- Zotung language
- Zotung Traditional Dress History
- Chin Traditional Dress History
