= Khau Fo =

- Village
- Location in Myanmar
- Coordinates: 22°45′3″N 93°25′31″E
- Country: Myanmar
- State: Chin State
- Township: Thantlang Township

Area
  - Total: 0.14 km^{2} (0.054 sq mi)

Population
  - Estimate (2014): 55
- Time zone: UTC+6:30 (Myanmar Standard Time)
- Number of households: 42

Khau Fo is a village in Myanmar.
