= Arakan Expeditions =

Expeditions against Mara tribes, 1841, 1847

Shendu Expedition
| Date | 1841; 1847 |
| Location | Lushai Hills; Arakan Hills |
| Result | Stalemate; Success in 1841; Failure in 1847 |

Belligerents
| British Raj; United Kingdom | Lushai chiefdoms |

Commanders and leaders
| (British Raj) Arthur Purves Phayre (British Raj) Albert Fytche; 1847 (British Raj) Henry Hopkinson (British Raj) Lieutenant Sanders | Mara tribes |

Units involved
| Aracan Local Battalion; 1847; Native infantry | Tribal Militias; Raiding parties |

The Arakan Expeditions were two British punitive expeditions against the Khumi tribes and the Mara tribes in the Southern Lushai Hills (present-day Mizoram) in 1841 and 1847. It was led through the Arakan Hills in relations to raids on the villages in the Chittagong Hill Tracts.

== Phayre Expedition ==
In 1842, following a series of raids on villages in the Chittagong Hill Tracts by the Mara tribes, an expedition was arranged under Captain A.P. Phayre and Lieutenant Albert Fytche. The force consisted of a subedar, a jemadar, three havildars and naiks, 70 sepoys and two buglers. The purpose of the raid was to curtail the bold raids made by the tribes for a few years. Permanent peacekeeping was not considered feasible without superintendency over them. Mr Ricketts, Commissioner of Chittagong, described the Southern Lushai Hills as unhealthy, difficult and remote to penetrate or hold over. Police officers of the hill tracts would be attacked, and elephant hunters would be deterred from the tribes. Phayre was sent to the frontier with the company of the Aracan Local Battalion commanded under Fytche.

Phayre observed the village in the distance and made the detachments detour to flank the village. The Khumi people in the detachments acted as guides and cut down the vegetation for the force. Phayre described the Khumis as experts in concealment in their natural environment. The houses were evacuated by the Khumi tribesmen. As the hills were steep and required ladders to communicate and move, the Khumis withheld the ladders. As a result, the houses were burnt down and the force withdrew with no injuries apart from spiked bamboo traps.

The battalion under Phayre and Fytche reached the chiefdom of the Wa-lien on a hill 4000 feet above the valley. The village was destroyed and Phayre and Fytche were commended for their conduct. In his report, Phayre stated that the success of the expedition will go to show the tribes to expect retaliation by the British and thus curb further attempts at raiding.

== Hopkinson Expedition ==
In 1847, responding to a series of raids from the Maras, Lieutenant Henry Hopkinson and Lieutenant Sanders took an escort of native infantry via the Kaladine river. The Maras had successfully raided villages of some Chakma tribes and the Phru. The British believed that a response from the Arakan frontier would be easier and convenient than an expedition from the Chittagong frontier. The goal was to push Arakan frontier border posts deeper into the Southern Lushai Hills for more effective control over the Mara tribes and their raiding routes. Hopkinson was granted a force consisting of 50 sepoys and 122 non-commissioned Europeana dn Indian soldiers. Hopkinson moved up the hills on 24 December. Along the way, Hopkinson encountered hostile Khumi villages which fired upon the force. He also encountered the Anoo which cooperated with him. Following this he passed through further Khumi villages under the control of the British. Hopkinson established contacts with the villages and formed alliances on behalf of the British and retired due to the issue fo facing more uncivilised Khumi villages along the path. Immediately following the return of the force, the Mara began to act hostile towards the newly allied villages of the British. By 1849, raids by the Maras resumed. By this time, Phayre who was now commissioner of Arakan, preferred a punitive expedition rather than further frontier outposts. The issue dragged on until 1854 in which the government of India issued the order to contact the Maras and form alliances with them. However, according the expedition was difficult owing to issues such as food supply and drinking water. The jungles of the Lushai Hills were considered impenetrable with many insects and diseases spreading among troops. In retaliation, the Maras raided villages assumed to be aiding the expeditionary force. As a result, Hopkinson and Sanders retreated without any success.

Hopkinson based on his experiences did not believe it would be simple to contact the Maras in their difficult territory. Furthermore, the Mara tribes were disunited and would not stop all possible raids if relations with one or few were established. Hopkinson thus preferred to invade the Maras and confederate them into one administrative entity allied to the British.

Captain Hopkinson, in a report in 1856, described that the Lushai Hills and their inhabitants were considered one of the most impracticable and unable to be occupied to deal with. Multiple attempts were made for negotiations by humanizing, winning the confidence of chiefs and coordinating policy. In sixteen years as Commissioner of the Arakan Hill Tracts, Hopkinson considered the dealings with the Maras and Lushais as unprogressable. Hopkinson would suggest that superintendency and annexation would be the most practical solution to check the propensity of the raiding tribes. In the case of failure to annex the tribes, Hopkinson suggested that the British withdraw from any future interactions and circumvent their ability to raid their subjects.

== Sources ==
- Yule, H. (February 1886). "Obituary: Lieut-General Sir Arthur Phayre, C.B., K.C.SI, G.C.M.G". Proceedings of the Royal Geographical Society and Monthly Record of Geography. 8 (2): 103–112.
- Verghese, C.G.; Thanzawna, R.L. (1997). A History of the Mizos. New Delhi: Vikas Publishing House.
- Hughes, W. Gwynne (1881). The Hill Tracts of Arakan. Rangoon: Government Press Rangoon.
- Pau, Pum Khan (2020). Indo-Burma Frontier and the Making of the Chin Hills. London: Routeledge. ISBN 9780429324703.
