= Zotung language =

Sino-Tibetan language spoken in Burma

Zotung
- Zo
- Native to: Burma
- Region: Rezua, Chin State; Matupi, Chin State; Hakha, Chin State; Aika, Chin State
- Ethnicity: Zotung (Zo Minphuin)
- Native speakers: 100,000 (global) (2022)
- Language family: Sino-Tibetan: Tibeto-Burman; Kuki-Chin; Maraic; Zotung
- Early form: Proto-Kuki-Chin
- Dialects: Rezua; Lungngo; Calthawng; Aika
- Writing system: Zoccaw Roman Alphabet

Language codes
- ISO 639-3: czt
- Glottolog: zotu1235

Zotung (Zobya) is a language spoken by the Zotung people, in the town of Rezua, Chin State, Burma. It is a continuum of closely related dialects and accents. The language does not have a standard written form since it has dialects with multiple variations on its pronunciations. A written script for Zotung was created in 1933 by Paw Khaw Ming (Siabawi Khuamin).

== Phonology ==
=== Zo alphabet (Zoccaw) ===
Aa AWaw Bb Cc Dd Ee Ff Gg Hh Ii Jj Kk Ll Mm Nn Oo Pp Rr Ss Tt Uu Vv Yy Zz

=== Vowels ===
Monophthongs			Diphthongs and triphthongs		
vowel	strong form	weak form	vowel	strong form	weak form
-a	/a/~	/ɔː/~/aʊː/	-ae	/æ/~/ɛː/	
-a	/a/~	/ɔː/~/aʊː/	-ai	/aiː/~	/æ/
-a	/a/~	/ɔː/~/aʊː/	-au	/aʊː/~	/oʊ/
-aw	/ɔː/~/auː/		-awi	/ɔiː/~/oɪ/~/ʏi/	
-aw	/ɔː/~/auː/		-awe	/ʊeː/~/øː/~/œː/	
-e	/eː/~/ɛ/~	/œ/	-ei	/eɪ/~/e/~/eiː/	
-e	/eː/~/ɛ/~	/œ/	-eu	/eʊː/~	/œ/
-i	/iː/	/ɨ/	-ia	/iːɑ/~/iɑ/~	/ja/~/jɛ/
-o	/o/~/oʊː/~	/ə/	-oi	/ɔiː/~/oiː/~/ʏː/	
-o	/o/~/oʊː/~	/ə/	-ou	/ə/~/œː/~/ʌː/	
-u	/uː/~	/ʊ/	-ua	/uaː/~	/ʋa/~/uə/
-u	/uː/~	/ʊ/	-ue	/ueː/~/ʋe/	
-u	/uː/~	/ʊ/	-ui	/uiː/~/iː/~/ʏː/	
-y	/ɪ/~/ɨː/~/ʏː/				

Etymologically, the long vowel counterparts of /aː/, /eː/, /iː/, /oː/, /ɔː/, and /uː/ have mutated or shifted towards several new vowels. Vowels such as /æː/, /ɔː/, /aʊː/, /ɛiː/, and /œː/ correspond to a single vowel /aː/ or /ɒː/ in more conservative Kuki-Chin languages. For instance, where Mizo and Laizo have mál [maːl], râlkap [raːlkap], nâsa [naːʂaː], pakhat [paˈkʰaːt], and sazûk [saˈzuːk], the correspondents in Zotung would be mæl [mæːl], rolkaw [rɔːlko], náwsaw [naʊːʂɔ], can-kheit [θaːn χɛiːt], and sazúk [sœˈzuːk].

=== Consonants ===
Zotung has the following consonants, with the first symbol being its orthographical form and the second one its representation in the IPA:

		Labial	Dental	Alveolar		Palatal	Velar	Glottal (Note: The glottal and glottalised consonants appear only in final position.)
		Labial	Dental	median	lateral	Palatal	Velar	Glottal
Plosive	voiceless	p [p]	t [t]				k [k]	
Plosive	aspirated	ph [pʰ]	th [tʰ]				kh [kʰ]	
Plosive	voiced	b [b]	d [d]				g [ɡ]	
Affricate	voiceless			c [t͡s]				
Affricate	aspirated			ch [t͡sʰ]				
Fricative	voiceless	f [f]	c [θ]	s [s]	si, se, sc, sh [ʃ]		kh, h [x]	h [h]
Fricative	voiced	v [v]	c [ð]	z [z]	z, j [ʒ]			
Approximant	voiceless				hl, l [l̥]			
Approximant	voiced				l [l]	z, j [j]		
Nasal	voiceless	hm, km [m̥]	hn, kn, gn [n̥]					
Nasal	voiced	m [m]	n [n]			ni [ɲ]	ng [ŋ]	
Trill	voiceless			hr, r [r̥]				
Trill	voiced			r [r]				

C before a, aw, o, u, and y is pronounced like a dental fricative /θ/~/ð/. C and s are palatalized before e and i resulting in words like ciate [tsʲaːte] and seryn [ʃɛˈɾœn]. H is not pronounced in some dialects in certain words, for example: mango thæhai [tʲæˈʔæː]. T is rhotacized in some dialects that results in words like khate [kʰatɛ] and tukiaccu [tˠuˈkʲeðu] being pronounced [kʰaˈɾɛ] and [təˈkeirʊ]. Z has a very wide pronunciation range. It can be pronounced like the voiced fricative /ʒ/ /z/ /j/ or the English /dʒ/.

==== Digraphs ====
The digraphs in Zotung are ch-, kh-, ph-, hr-, rh-, and th-.

Ch- is seldom used in native words other than family or clan names. Ch- evolved from the palatalized soft t that preceded the vowels e and i. For example, chihno (death) was originally thihna or thihnak. Kh- in formal speech is a palatalized k sound. However, it is pronounced as /x/~/χ/ in informal speech. Hr- is a rare digraph representing /r̥/. It has evolved into /ɦ/ or /ʀ/ in some dialects. Rh- is not used in vernacular writing.

Zotung is rich with consonant clusters that have etymologically remained the same, but are written with schwas or other vowels to make a disyllable. They are found in native words such as tynkrin (firmly), cintling, ablyn (all), sparo as well as in loan words like Biathlam (Revelation), Kris (Christ), naiklab (nightclub), Griekram (Greece), and Bethlem (Bethlehem).

== Distribution ==
In 2009 VanBik lists the following Zotung villages: Aika, Lotaw, Lovaw, Ccangho, Pangva, Ramcci, Sihanthung, Zawngnak, Angraw, Polei, Vuakkhipaw, Lavoikum, Darcung, Khawboi, Setlai, Lungkhin, Leipi, Calthawng, Langly, Sensi, Khawtua, Tuinia, Rovaw, Rezua, Ccawtui, Ransae, Etang, Thandya, Tuibyn, Hrinthang, Siangaw, Lungthlialia, Thawlang, Hunglei, Raso, Tuilaw, Tingsi, Zesaw, Thesi, Lungring, Sungpi, Votui, Kailung, Belae, Lungngo, Sempi, Tuphae, Lungdua, Suiton, Daidin, Din, Voiru, Narbung.

== Grammar ==
Zotung grammar (Zotung: byazeirnázia) is the study of the morphology and syntax of Zotung, a Kuki-Chin language spoken in the Indian subcontinent and Southeast Asia. Zotung is an agglutinative language with some elements of fusionality. It has become more innovative as fusional elements have increased. Its synthetic nature allows for free word order, although the dominant arrangement is subject-object-verb. There are definite articles and a morphological indefinite article depending on the source. Subject pronouns and object pronouns are often dropped due to its polypersonal agreements found in the plural conjugation of verbs.

=== Syntax ===
The primary word order is subject-object-verb. However, almost all nouns undergo declension, resulting in a fairly free word order. For example, the sentence "Kae beikinnka hlaw kasak" (lit. 'I in church song I sing') can also be ordered as "Kae kasak hlaw beikinnka" (lit. 'I sing song in church') without losing its original meaning. Sentences in Zotung can be formed in many different ways, the most common being dative constructions. This construction uses the dative case of nominals and pronominals. Dative constructions can occur with almost all verbs. An example is given below:

Kae θu kakía / Kae kakía nynn ("I am cold")
Ynkía (literally means, "cold is to/on me")

The first example implicates that the speaker has a cold personality or a body that is cold all around, rather than feeling physically cold. The subject on the first sentence is in the nominative case. The second sentence uses a dative polypersonal conjugation without the transient copula verb thuavo. This construction is always used to mean one feels physically. It is still a productive construction that can be used with almost all verbs. Its use is a bit different in set proverbs like "namo nih kezym" ("I trust in you", lit. 'to you I have my belief').

=== Nouns ===
==== Gender ====
Some nouns have gender; however, nouns with gender are usually sex specific nouns such as animals or natural landscapes like hills, caves, or species of organisms. Most of these nouns have endings like -nung, -pi, -paw, -ly that tell if they are feminine or masculine, such as luikunung (name of a hill), saepaw (elephant), sapi (female offspring of an animal). Agreement in gender for adjectives can be observed such as with the neuter adjective ahoy—it has two other forms namely, masculine and common gender hoivo and feminine hoino; the initial a- indicates the common or neuter gender and -p- and -n- indicate masculine and feminine gender.

Animacy and inanimacy are distinguished in the various usages of certain pronouns. The third person accusative amo cannot be used with inanimate nouns so therefore the pronoun is dropped and the clitic a- conjugation is used for both the nominative and accusative cases. This is also true to some extent for the second person personal pronouns. The animate determiner pronoun hom- cannot be used for inanimate nouns. Pawmou, ymmo, and vavoma are used with inanimate nouns instead.

==== Initial a- ====
The initial a- is found in some nouns: arak (ale), amyn (scent), arran (branch), askare (wing). It is used on a very limited number of nouns that are inanimate and cannot stand alone without the prefix. When it is used with a noun that can stand alone, it denotes the genitive case and shows belonging of the object to a person, such as in arru (its bone), amitàe (its eyes), alemæ (its tail). The prefix can also be used to show definiteness in a very limited number of nouns, as in:

ar longe athinàe leitetu umkukholeilango
our inside(GEN) the-livers not(INSTR)(ACC) be-cannot-(FUT)-1PL(INCL)
Without [our] livers we cannot live/be.

The prefix is also used to form the adjectival form of verbs:

- khyapaw (to be bitter), akhak (bitter)
- niapaw (drink), anian (oily)
- thopaw (to be fatty), atho (fat/fatty)

=== Vowel harmony ===
To some extent, Zotung uses vowel harmony when endings are attached to words. For example, one of the most common endings in the language is -traw, a diminutive/comparative ending. When a word with closed and/or mid vowel uses the ending -traw, it changes to -tri as in imonuntri (newborn girl) and syntri (a little while). Some nouns with a closed vowel change to have a more open vowel. An example is zawngpo / zongpaw (ape), which changes to zuapo / zuapaw in some dialects retaining the difference. Another example is vo / vaw (stream); when the augmentative ending -pii is added, the root changes to va-, resulting in vapii (river).

=== Verbs ===
Zotung verbs are heavily inflected and are highly irregular with many exceptions. They consist of a stem or base and various conjugation endings indicating person, tense, aspect, mood, and more. One way for fusional inflection in verbs is through a process known as stem alternation (Zotung: rulenná). Each verb has at least two stems, formally named stem I, stem II, and so on. Each stem differs from each other by apophony, vowel length, consonant voicing or devoicing, the addition of a consonant, or entirely changing the lexicon. Since there has not been extensive research done on Zotung, verbs have yet to be grouped into conjugation classes.

==== Stem alternation ====
Like the other Kuki-Chin languages, Zotung utilizes apophony as a grammatical inflection. It is used for various purposes such as grammatical moods and distinction between noun and verb forms. The most common type of apophony is the Kuki-Chin-specific vowel stem alternation wherein the stem vowel of a verb changes to inflect its mode. These alternations are grouped into Form I, Form II, Form III, and so on. However, there is not a universally accepted way of categorizing them. Examples of vowel stem alternations are given below:

Vowel stem alternations
Verb	Form I	Form II	Form III
niapaw (to drink)	nia-	nei-	nek
chiapo (to kill)	chia-	chiáh	theit
bepo (to greet)	bei-	bek	beik

An example of a clause using Forms I, II, and III is given below for the verb niapaw (to drink):

Form I: Arak na nialanze, nah lubok yngaeseici.

Form II: Arakkha na nevelan khy.

Form III: Arakkho na neklei khy em?
If you keep drinking ale, your brain shall rot.

You shall not be drinking ale anymore.

You have not drunken any ale, [right]?

==== Negation ====
Negation usually follows the verb. There are many words to denote negation, the most common being lei, khy, nan, and lou. Lei is an auxiliary adverb that is commonly used as a compound negator, similar to the French pas. Khy is a simple negator used in declarative sentences such as khocci khy meaning "it is not cold". Nan is used as an imperative negator such as in innlae pae nan meaning "do not go out". Lou is used as an auxiliary as in khuara lou khy meaning "it has not rain". Additionally, some determiner pronouns in the Lungngo and Calthawng dialects have a negative form leading to some instances of double negation. An example is the word for "what"—its lemma form is pawmou in the standard language, ymmo in the northern dialects, and vavoma in the Rezua dialect; the corresponding negative forms are pawmak and ymma (this form is absent in the Rezua dialect due to a series of vowel mergers and a simplification of grammar in regions with more trade and contact).

=== Noun derivation ===
There are many endings attached to words to convey a slightly modified meaning. They may also be realized as grammatical cases. The most common are -no, -zia, -po, and -tu. The ending -no is used to nominalize verbs while -zia is for adjectives and occasionally nouns. The ending -po could be a masculine ending or an infinitive ending; when -po is an infinitive ending, the word is stressed at the last syllable. The ending -tu is used to modify verbs to become a noun in the accusative case. For example,

- riapo (v. to read) → rianaw (n. reading as in scripture)
- hmuipo (v. to see) → muihnaw (n. sight, vision)
- sei (v. to sin) → seino (n. sin)
- umtu (n. an attitude) → umtuzia (n. desired attitudes)
- phuapo / phan (v. to compose) → phuatu / phantu (n. composer)

=== Cases ===
All nouns in Zotung inflect for case. They can be inflected for the nominative, accusative, instrumental, dative, genitive, vocative, and various forms of the locative such as the inessive, intrative, and adessive. The nominative case differs between dialects based on the vowel harmony of a dialect's differing vowels. The unmarked, lemma form of most nouns are in the accusative form. The accusative can be further divided into a separate case depending on if the definite article -kha is counted as a case suffix, the definite accusative. The instrumental case can also be used to show the extent of a period of time. It is inflected for in some prepositions and postpositions such as ciate (extent of time), ryte (with), liare (by). The dative has become more common and is taking over the role of the locative in younger speech. The genitive is not required when a noun acts as an adjective, but it still is sometimes used even in the adjectival form.

	bolpen- (pen)	
	Singular	Plural
Nominative	bolpenin	bolpenàenyn
Accusative	bolpen	bolpenae
Instrumental	bolpente	bolpeten
Dative	bolpekla	bolpenàeklan
Genitive	bolpenge	bolpenàeke
Locative	bolpenga	bolpenàeka
Vocative	pou bolpen	bolpenolou

An example of the cases in use is:

Bolpenge catui rouza bolpekla ka kiza “Pobolpen yn kiccave” ka koza, bolpenin kaklan yn kir.
Pen(GEN) ink dried-up(causal) pen(DAT) 1P(NOM) return(causal) “pen(VOC) here(DAT) return(PRES)” 1P(NOM) call(causal), pen(NOM) 1P(DAT) here(DAT) returned
the pen’s ink dried up so I returned to the pen and “O pen, return at once” I called and so it returned to me (in benefit of the pen).

Bolpenga umpo bolpenge bawmtraw adipo bolpente bolpekha ka suanak.
Pen(LOC/inside) from(GEN) pen(GEN) ink-pipe-small -- pen(INSTR) pen(ACC) 1P(NOM) get-out(INSTR)
I get out the small ink pipe inside the pen using a smaller pen.

Some case endings of proper nouns and common nouns are differentiated especially in the dative and locative cases. In the dative case, proper nouns take the -lan or -lam suffix and change according to the rules of vowel gradation. For example, the village name Thesi would become Thesilam for its dative case while Siangaw would become Siangalan.

	Proper nouns Thalsi, Siangaw	
	Zero mutation	Mutated
Accusative	Thālsi / Thesi	Siangaw
Dative	Thesilam	Siangaklan
Locative	Thesia	Siangakkya

Additionally, there are other inconsistencies in how nouns are inflected. These mismatches could be further grouped into noun classes, if Zotung has any. For instance, nouns ending in -á, -aw, or -o have an irregular declension.

Case	rawko (army)	
Case	Singular	Plural
Nominative	rawko	—N/a
Accusative	rawkonyn	—N/a
Instrumental	rawkate	—N/a
Dative	rawklan	—N/a
Genitive	rawka	—N/a
Locative	rawkoeka	—N/a
Vocative	—N/a	—N/a

Some nominals have no separate ending in the nominative and dative cases. This group is mostly made up of nouns ending in -am and -an.

Case	vawlan (heaven)	
Case	Singular	Plural
Nominative	vawlan	vawramhe
Accusative	vawlanyn	vawramhe
Instrumental	vawlane	vawlare
Dative	vawlan	vawramhe
Genitive	vawrame	—N/a
Locative	vawramka	—N/a
Vocative	—N/a	—N/a

=== Agreement ===
There are two prominent numbers in Zotung, singular and plural. Each of the cases have a somewhat specific plural suffix. The usual plural suffixes for the accusative in colloquial dialects are -ae, -hae, -e, and -æ. The matter of which to use depends on the previous consonant, stem vowel, and speaker's preference. Most adjectives that describe a noun are also required to agree in number, and occasionally gender and case. Therefore, in the phrase below where the word meaning 'royalties', boinungeklan, is a feminine noun in the dative plural case, the adjective amoivaw must also be in the feminine dative plural:

amoinune boinungeklan
to the beautiful princesses

While agreement in gender for masculine, common and neuter nouns are optional, agreement in the feminine is explicitly required.

Some nouns are naturally plural and thus do not require the regular plural suffixes, such as zapii (crowd of people), mipi (people), ablyn (all that are present), and loramsa (farm animals).

=== Question clauses ===
Questions are formed with both intonation and particles. Intonation varies from dialect to dialect and person to person. Question particles also vary from dialect to dialect. The formal standard language based on the Lungngo dialect uses the question particles i, ho, khawp, tou, and mou. The particles tou and mou have different forms in different contexts. Tou is derived from ta but tou has become more dominant and ta has become a form of tou. In all, tou has four forms: tou, ta, tawh, and tan. It is used in yes/no questions. Mou is derived from mah, similar to the case with tou. Mou also has four forms: mou, mah, maw, and man. It is used in simple questions together with the noun; for example: Pawcikumou nah hminkha? ('What is [question particle] your name?')

=== Pronouns ===
In Zotung, there are separate pronouns for the nominative, accusative, dative, and genitive cases that do not reflect the usual declension found in nouns. Examples in the nominative and dative are given below:

Personal pronouns, nominative proclitic
Person	Singular	Dual	Plural exclusive	Plural inclusive
1st	Ka		Kae	Emi, Eni
2nd	Na	Nanin	Nanni	
3rd	A, ani (neut.)	Min	An, mimo	

Pronouns in the dative are marked for both the subject and direct object, also known as polypersonalism. The proclitics are used with different conjugations to achieve clarity.

Personal pronouns, dative proclitic singular
Singular	1st	2nd	3rd
1st	ku	kae	ka
2nd	nae / un	na	na
3rd	yn	ae	—N/a

Personal pronouns, dative proclitic plural
Singular	1st	2nd	3rd
1st	—N/a	kae	kae
2nd	yn	—N/a	na
3rd	oun	ae	ah

Personal pronouns, dative proclitic plural
plural	1st	2nd	3rd
1st	keu	kae	ah
2nd	oun	nanni	nan
3rd	un	ae	a

=== Conjugation ===
All verbs in Zotung have two or more forms. The different forms are used for different moods and the number of subjects completing the action. Most verbs are only inflected in the plural. Dual number is only realized when the verb is conjugated since there are not separate dual pronouns. Some verbs that are inflected in the singular change stress. However, they aren't shown in the orthography. An example of a regular verb conjugation in the indicative mood is given below.

fiapo (to go, walk); Stem I fe- conjugation
	Singular	Dual	Plural (exclusive)	Plural inclusive
1st	kae kafeih	aeni a feih	kaenin kefei	(aeni) a feio
2nd	namaw nafeih	—N/a	(nanni) nan feu	—N/a
3rd	amo a feih	an feih	(mimo) an feihe	—N/a

=== Tense and aspect ===
Tense in Zotung is similar to other Kuki-Chin languages. Verbs are inflected for in the past and future tenses. The present tense is usually either in the lemma (not infinitive) form or are used with auxiliary verbs and time descriptive words. The continuous present tense can also be shown by suffixing. Regular verbs are inflected like the following:

niapaw (to drink); 1st INC. plural stem I nek-
	Preterit	Perfective	Habitual	Continuative	Delimitative
Past	nekveo	nekove	a vaneheo	a vaneiono	a vaneoza
Present	a neko	a neboiveo	a nekheio	a nekongo	a neioza
Future	necio	niavelan	niahelango	nekoncio	nialanoza

Verbs in Zotung have around two to three infinitives and two gerunds that can be inflected for aspect and voice. The first infinitive is the one found in dictionary entries. It is formed using the stem II form of verbs plus the endings -o, -aw, or -á. This infinitive form is present in all dialects where the gerund form is used synonymously to the English -ing gerund. The second infinitive is also formed using the stem II form plus the ending -an. It can also function as a gerund and is used almost synonymously to the English to-infinitive. However, its use has been diminishing in northern dialects where it is being replaced with the future form of verbs. In dialects where both the future form and second infinitive are used, the future form is created using the stem I form plus the variable endings -no or -go. The third infinitive is formed using stem I forms of verbs with the ending -an. It is synonymous to the English bare infinitive.

Infinitive and gerund forms
	1st infinitive	2nd infinitive	3rd infinitive	future gerund form
chiapo	chiapo	chialan	thelan	theingo
sávo (to cause to fall)	sávo / sovo	sálan / solan	saglan / saklan	sagno
dókuvo (to go against)	dókuvo	dólan	deilan	doungo

== Sources ==
- Shintani Tadahiko. 2015. The Zotung language. Linguistic survey of Tay cultural area (LSTCA) no. 105. Tokyo: Research Institute for Languages and Cultures of Asia and Africa (ILCAA).
