= Maraic languages =

Group of Tibeto-Burman languages

Maraic
- Geographic distribution: Mizoram, India and Chin State, Myanmar
- Ethnicity: Mara
- Linguistic classification: Sino-Tibetan: Tibeto-Burman; Central Tibeto-Burman (?); Kuki-Chin–Naga; Kuki-Chin; Maraic

Language codes
- Glottolog: mara1381 Maraic

The Maraic languages are a branch of Kuki-Chin languages.

== Languages ==
The Maraic languages are (VanBik 2009:23):

- Mara (Tlosai)
- Duatu (Lochei and Hawthai/Levaw(Nohro & Notlia)
- Sizo (Chapi, Ngaphe and Sabyh)
- Lutuv (Lytu/Kahno)
- Zophei (Vawngtu, Leitak)
- Senthang
- Zotung (Calthawng, Innmai, Lungngo)
- Hlaipao (Vahapi [Zyhno], Heima and Lialai)

== Sound changes ==
VanBik (2009) lists the following sound changes from Proto-Kuki-Chin to Proto-Maraic.

- Proto-Kuki-Chin *-p, *-t, *-k > Proto-Maraic *-ʔ
- Proto-Kuki-Chin *-ʔ > Proto-Maraic zero
- Proto-Kuki-Chin *-r, *-l > Proto-Maraic zero
- Proto-Kuki-Chin *kr- > Proto-Maraic *ts-

Peterson (2017) groups Kuki-Chin in a peripheral/central manner. As a result, he groups Maraic and Central Kuki-Chin, as one Central Kuki-Chin grouping, and refers to the latter as "Core Central". He supports this grouping by the treatment of Proto-Kuki-Chin *Cl- in the families.
