= Tlosaih people =

Subgroup of the Mara in Northeast India

The Tlosaih are a subgroup of the Mara people community of South Asia. They inhabit the southernmost part of Mizoram, India under the Mara Autonomous District Council.
