= Zotung people =

Ethnic group in Chin State, Myanmar

Zotung
Total population
- 54,000 (2025)

Regions with significant populations
- Chin State, Magway Region, Malaysia, United States, Canada

Languages
- Zotung language, Kuki-Chin languages

Religion
- Christianity (predominantly), Animism (originally)

Related ethnic groups
- Zo, Zomi, Paite, Tedim, Thadou

The Zotung are an ethnic group indigenous to Chin State in western Myanmar (formerly Burma), primarily residing in the central and southern regions of the state. Zotung people belong to the Tibeto-Burman language family and are ethnically and culturally distinct from other Chin groups, although they share certain historical and cultural affinities. Most Zotung people are traditionally subsistence farmers and engage in hunting, like many other Chin ethnic groups. Their pre-Christian religious system, known as Lawki or Sakhua, was animistic and centered around nature and ancestor worship.

== History ==
Due to the absence of a written language until the 20th century, the early history of the Zotung people is largely preserved through oral traditions, folk tales, and traditional songs. Some songs are believed to date back to as early as the 10th century CE, based on place names and linguistic clues. The Zotung people refer to themselves as "Zo," a name also used by neighboring tribes, including the Mara people, who call them Azyu.

In July and August 2015, the Zotung region was severely affected by floods and landslides caused by heavy monsoon rains. According to the Zotung Relief Committee, 364 houses were destroyed, and paddy fields and crops were devastated. Roads and bridges were rendered unusable by landslides, leading to widespread isolation and hardship.

== Traditions ==
=== Religion (Beiknaw) ===
Traditionally, the Zotung believed in a supreme deity called Pachia, who was considered benevolent and not associated with misfortune. Malevolent spirits known as Khozi were believed to cause illness, misfortune, or spiritual imbalance (hnam). High priests conducted rituals (Khuarum) to appease the Khozi, seeking protection and prosperity. Offerings were not made to Pachia, as he was not seen as a source of harm. The belief in Khozi has diminished significantly since the widespread conversion to Christianity beginning in the early 20th century.

=== Death and afterlife ===
The Zotung concept of the afterlife included multiple realms. Commoners who died of natural causes were believed to enter michi Khua ("abode of the dead"), which was further divided into: Pucchi (or Pulthi): the resting place for those who died peacefully. Their deaths were marked by days of communal mourning and feasting. Sawchi (or Sarthi): reserved for individuals who died from violence, supernatural causes, or disease. These deaths were considered ominous. The deceased were buried without ceremony, and families performed purification rituals, including the symbolic offering of maize mixed with the blood of a hen.

Ka tungvaw’ e Sawsi hynh uibuapaw chite aemen, naedi thyte vaedi nynh pong thyasah oh lah, Khuaninpi nynh ccawkhae sala!

"Oh! The sickness inside me, be cleansed from the blood of the cock and maize. Let the sun set you also."

After a seven-day period of isolation, the bereaved family was considered purified. Those who died with honor, such as in battle or through hosting a significant festival, were believed to ascend to Hotheng, a realm of eternal feasting and joy. All deceased passed through Lunglei Mual ("Lunglei Hill"), a metaphysical checkpoint ruled by the goddess Sawnnung. She guided souls to their respective destinations after they drank from Rih Tui, a sacred lake believed to erase memories of earthly life.

=== Clothing ===
Traditional Zotung clothing shares certain features with the traditional attire of other Zo and Chin communities, while retaining its own local characteristics. Traditional garments, woven textiles, patterns, and ornaments form an important part of Zotung cultural identity. The specific names, styles, and uses of garments such as the Anki and Boei should be documented through local cultural knowledge and historical sources. According to a local oral tradition, a mythical mermaid known as Tuithangnung gave intricately patterned blankets to a man remembered as Sempi-Tho Khe as a parting gift. The story associates these blankets with the origins of traditional Zotung textiles. It is an important account of local cultural heritage, although its historical details and the extent of its influence on the wider Chin national dress have yet to be independently verified. Traditional textiles and clothing vary among Chin communities in their colours, patterns, weaving techniques, and ceremonial uses. Further research into historical garments, oral histories, and local weaving traditions would help clarify the distinctive contribution of Zotung textile heritage to the broader cultural history of the Chin peoples.
