= Lutuv =

Indigenous people inhabiting Southern Chin State in Myanmar

The Lutuv (Hakha Chin: Lautu) are an indigenous people living in southern Chin State, Myanmar. The Lutuv are widely known by other tribes as the "Lautu of the Southern independent villages", a name derived from the central dominant Hakha Lai pronunciation of their endonym. The Lutuv speak the Lutuv language, and they are predominantly Christian.

== Ethnonyms ==
The terms used to refer to the group differ between outsiders and the community itself:

- Exonym: Lautu – a name used by The Lautu and others.
- Endonym: Lutuv – the name used by the community.

== Geographic distribution ==
As of January 2017, the Lautu population was approximately 50,000. It is believed that the first Lutuv village, Tyise (also known as Tisen), was founded around AD 1450. Lutuv is spoken in the following villages in Chin State:

1. Hnaring
2. Khyhraw (Khuahrang)
3. Tho-O (Thang-Aw)
4. Aasaw (Fanthen)
5. Chuonge (Surngen)
6. Tise (Tisen)
7. Seto (Sentung)
8. Hrepuv (Hriangpi)
9. Saata (Saate)
10. Lungkyi (Leikang)
11. Lawthuotluo (Longthantlang)
12. Zingmaa (Zuamang)
13. Capaw (Capaw)
14. Pangtie (Pintia)
15. La-uu (La-uu)
16. Lyipuv (Leipi)

Many Lautu have emigrated to Australia and the United States.

== Bibliography ==
- Ling, Tial C.; Inta, Angkhana; Armstrong, Kate E.; Little, Damon P.; Tiansawat, Pimonrat; Yang, Yong-Ping; Phokasem, Patcharin; Tuang, Za Khai; Sinpoo, Chainarong; Disayathanoowat, Terd (2022). "Traditional Knowledge of Textile Dyeing Plants: A Case Study in the Chin Ethnic Group of Western Myanmar". Diversity. 14 (12). MDPI: 1065. Bibcode:2022Diver..14.1065L. doi:10.3390/d14121065.
- Carey, B.S.; Tuck, H.P. (1896). The Chin Hills. Rangoon: Government Press.
