= Mara Evangelical Church =

Evangelical church in Myanmar

Coordinates: 20°09′10.1″N 92°52′04.0″E

Mara Evangelical Church (MEC) is one of the churches in Myanmar (previously known as Burma) founded by English missionaries Reverend and Mrs. Reginald Arthur Lorrain in 1907. It is one of the oldest churches in Chin State, Myanmar. It was part of the unified Mara Church among the Mara people until it was forced to become independent after India and Myanmar attained independence from the British Raj in 1947 and 1948 respectively. The Mara Church in India became the Evangelical Church of Maraland and Congregational Church of India, Maraland (CCI-M), while the one in Myanmar became MEC.

== Headquarters ==
Mara Evangelical Church has its headquarters at Lialaipi (Lailenpi) and Sabyhpi (Khihlo) in Chin State, Myanmar. It has its mission headquarters at Sittwe, previously known as Akyab, Rakhine State. It also has an office in Yangon, the largest and former capital city of Myanmar.

== History ==
English missionaries Reverend and Mrs. Reginald Arthur Lorrain (brother of missionary James Herbert Lorrain) founded Lakher Pioneer Mission in London in 1905 to engage in mission work among the Mara people in British India, which included modern-day Myanmar. Finally, the missionaries arrived at Saikao, a village in southern Mizoram on September 26, 1907, and started spreading the gospel of Jesus Christ among the Mara people who inhabit modern-day Saiha District in Mizoram, India and the southwestern part of Chin State in Myanmar.

The church grew rapidly. In 1960 the church became fully self-sufficient. In Chin state, the area inhabited by the Mara people falls under three townships – Thantlang, Matupi and Paletwa. When India and Myanmar attained independence, Mara-inhabited areas were divided among the two nations. The church founded by the missionaries was also divided. Thus, the Mara Evangelical Church (MEC) was born in Myanmar, while the Evangelical Church of Maraland and its sister church Congregational Church of India, Maraland (CCI-M) were born in India. The Maras embrace Christianity today; 87% of Mara Christians are members of the Mara Evangelical Church.

== Association/Membership/Affiliation ==
Mara Evangelical Church (MEC) is:

- a member of Myanmar Council of Churches (MCC) since 1985.
- a member of Christian Conference of Asia since 1989.
- a member of World Communion of Reformed Churches since 1993.
- an associate member of World Council of Churches since 2001.
- a member of Lutheran World Federation since 2010.

As of 2004 the church had more than 17,200 members and almost 100 congregations in Myanmar in 2004.

As of 2021, according to its website, the church has 21,573 members, 87 congregations, and 9 preaching points with 27 pastorates. The denomination has a theological seminary and Private Mission middle school and Center of Maraland Education.
