= Hnaring =

Hnaring Khy
- village tract
- Location in Myanmar
- Coordinates: 22°11′34.9″N 93°26′3.79″E
- Country: Myanmar
- State: Chin
- District: Hakha District
- Township: Thantlang Township
- Population (2014): 1,881
  - Ethnicities: Lutuv
  - Religions: Christianity

Hnaring (Burmese: နှာဟရိန်ရွာ, MLCTS: hna ha rin rwa) is a village tract in Thantlang Township, in Chin State in Myanmar. It contains two villages- Hnaring A and Hnaring B, constituting the largest settlement of the Lutuv Chin people.

The village of Hnaring, split into an older (Hnaring Khyhlung) and newer (Hnaring Khythaa) village, is theorized to have been founded around 1660, according to Fr. André Bareigts's notes on Lutuv oral history.
