= Congregational Church in India =

The Congregational Church of India (Maraland) is located in Saikao (Serkawr), in the southern part of Mizoram Northeast India. Founded in 1907 by foreign missionary Reginald Arthur Lorrain (brother of Missionary James Herbert Lorrain) this church initially established its headquarters office in Saikao (Serkawr) and stands as the original missionary establishment.

== History ==
Before Lorrain's arrival in British India, he established the Lakher Pioneer Mission in London in 1905. Two years later, he arrived in Saikao (also known as Serkawr).

In the 1989 General Assembly, issues arose regarding the relocation of the assembly or headquarters office from Saikao (Serkawr) village to Saiha town. However, the Independent Church of Maraland Assembly Conference did not permit the shift, leading to discontent among some church members. Consequently, they rebelled from the Independent Church of Maraland and established a new church known as the Evangelical Church of Maraland in Saiha, Mizoram, in 1989. They also constructed and established their headquarters office in Saiha. However, the Independent Church of Maraland headquarters office remains in Saikao (Serkawr), Mizoram.

=== Conversation with Penge Congregational Church of London ===
Following the 1989 split, the Independent Church of Maraland faced challenges and difficulties, akin to abandoned siblings, yet persevered despite numerous obstacles. During the missionary era, communication often occurred with the Penge Congregational Church in London. Consequently, some church leaders informed Miss Nellie Fife and Reverend Dr. John Travell about the issues and hardships faced by the Independent Church of Maraland.

Years later, Reverend Dr. John Travell suggested cooperation with the Mizoram Presbyterian Church, although discussions were ongoing. Meanwhile, Travell, invited from the Australian Federation, attended the 138th Conference of the Congregational Federation in the 1990s. During this significant event, he highlighted the history, background, problems, and difficulties faced by the Independent Church of Maraland to the Congregational Federation of N. S. W. Australia.

=== Reverend Dr. F. Lambert Carter visited Saikao ===
Expressing deep concern upon learning about the Independent Church of Maraland, Reverend Dr. F. Lambert Carter, Moderator, visited Saikao in 1992 and presented letters regarding cooperation between the Independent Church of Maraland and the Congregational Federation of NSW, Australia. The church agreed to the proposal.

=== Independent Church of Maraland transformed into The Congregational Church of India (Maraland) ===
Subsequently, in 1994, Carter returned to attend the Independent Church of Maraland General Assembly at Saikao. With the approval and witness of Carter and Mrs. Violet Louise Anne Mark (the last missionary of the Maras), the Independent Church of Maraland transformed into the Congregational Church of India (Maraland) and became associated with the Australian Federation.

The Congregational Church of India (Maraland) Registration number of under Government of Mizoram was Gov't Regd. No. SR.75/95.MZ-RFS. Registered by Rev. L. Mark in 1995.

Present 2024 Leaders of The Congregational Church of India (Maraland):

General Secretary: Revd. David K. Beihrothlalo

Contact: +91 8132-931-916

Assembly Leaders:

Assembly Chairman : L. Makhu

Assembly Chairman Elect. : Simeon Nótlia

Assembly Secretary (Sr.) : KT. Meka

Assembly Secretary (Jr.) : LB. Hrolua

Assembly Treasurer : C. Siacho

Assembly Finance Secretary : J. Vabeingiachhie

Motto : Jesus Christ as the King (Philippians 2:10)

Office Address: The Office of The Congregational Church of India (Maraland), (Founded by; LPM on 26th. September 1907) Hqrs.: Saikao, Siaha District, Mizoram, Pin - 796911

________________________
