= James Herbert Lorrain =

British missionary

The Reverend James Herbert Lorrain
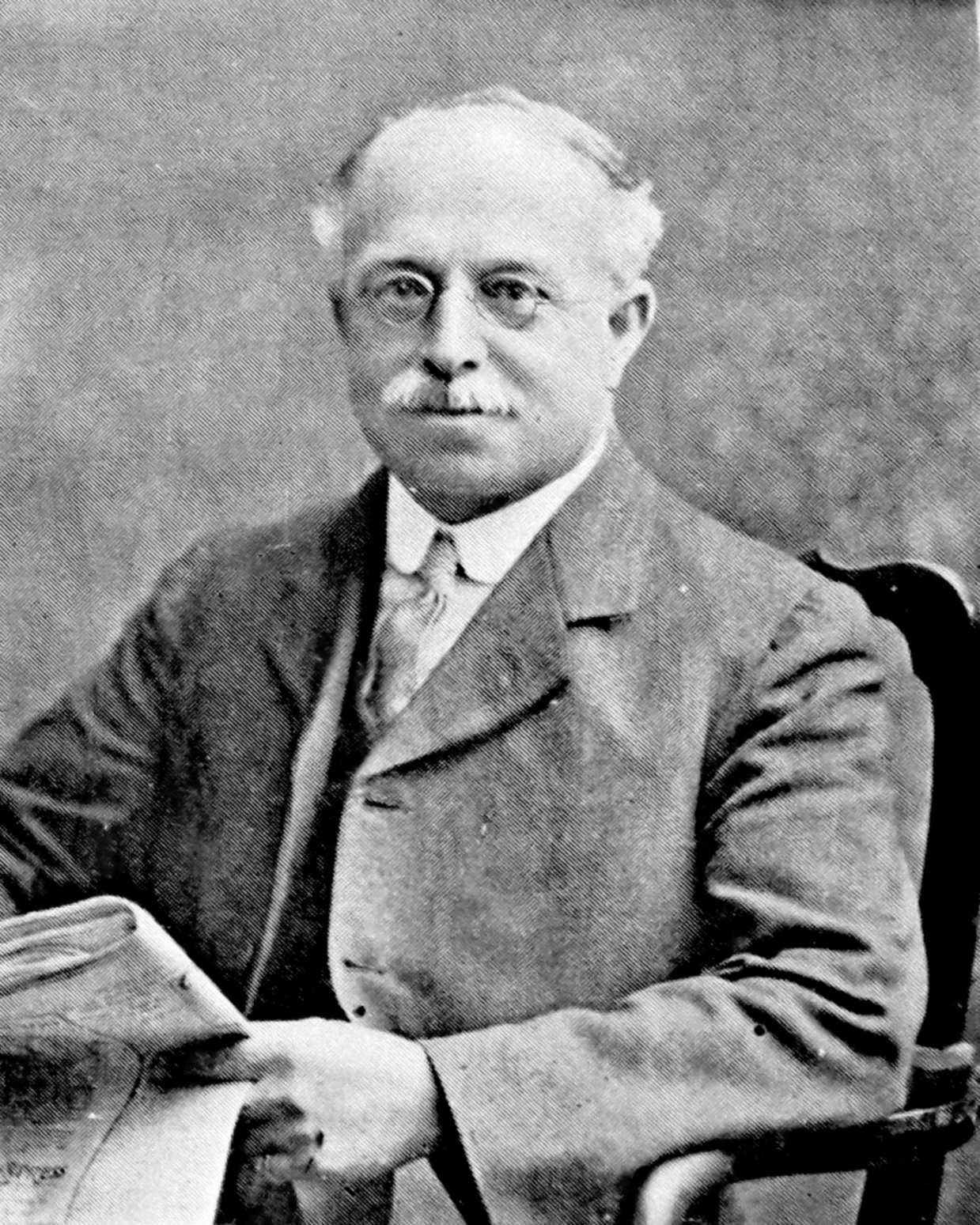
- Portrait (date unknown)
- Born: 6 February 1870
- Died: 1 July 1944 (aged 74); London and was buried in grave Lane KK, Section No. CC, Plot No. 16J in South Ealing Cemetery, 28 Chilton Ave, London W5 4RU, UK.
- Other name: Pu Buanga (to Mizo people)
- Occupation: Christian missionary
- Known for: Christianity in Mizoram, Mizo language, and Mizo literature

James Herbert Lorrain, or Pu Buanga, (6 February 1870 – 1 July 1944) was a British Baptist missionary in northeast India, including Mizoram, Assam, and Arunachal Pradesh. He and Frederick William Savidge reduced the Mizo language (known as the Lushai language under the Colonial British name), to writing—devised an alphabet using Roman lettering and phonetic form of spelling based on Hunterian system translation; compiled grammar and dictionaries for missionary activities and clerical administration.

He and F.W. Savidge were credited to the establishment of Christianity and education in Mizoram. They compiled the first Lushai grammar and dictionary. As a gifted lexicographer, Lorrain single-handedly was responsible for the origin of written language and hymns in Mizo. More popularly known as "Pu Buanga Dictionary", Dictionary of the Lushai Language became the foundation of Mizo language and literature.

== Life ==
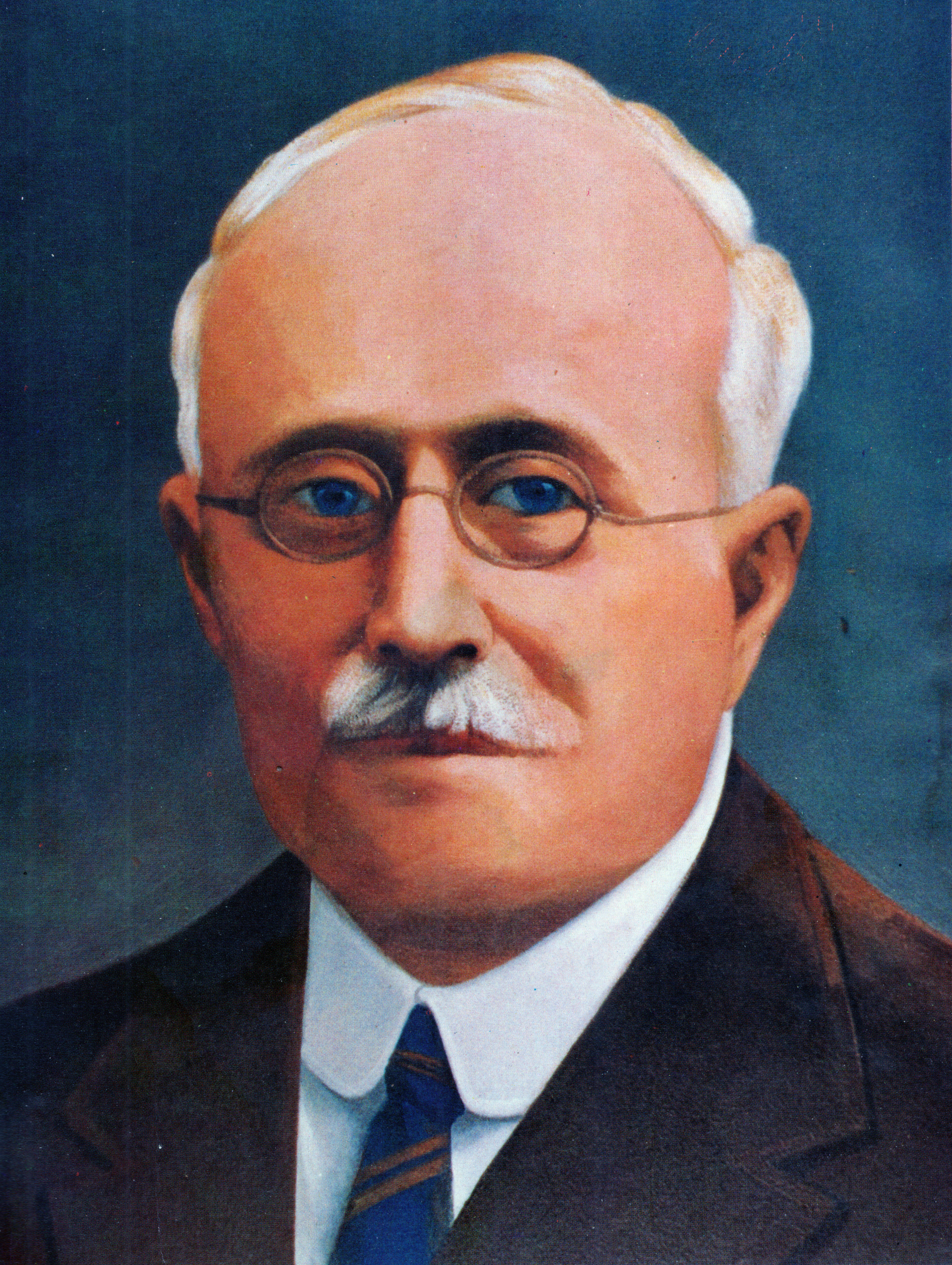
Portrait of J. H. Lorrain

Lorrain was brought up in South London as a Congregationalist. He was baptised at a young age. His father was a postmaster at London Post Office. Following his father's profession, he worked as a telegraphist in the same post office. His family was a member of London Highgate Road Baptist Church. Here he met F.W. Savidge. In 1890, story of Mary Winchester, a six-year-old British girl who was held hostages by Mizo tribes, and rescued by the British military, was a headline. When Lorrain saw a portrait the hapless girl in captivity in a newspaper, he prayed and planned to work as a missionary to the remote tribes. In December 1890 he saw the exact opportunity under Robert Arthington's Aborigines Mission. He resigned from post office and left London on 16 December 1890. His ship arrived at Calcutta on 21 January 1891, not really knowing how to proceed further for the unexplored land. He stayed in Bengal (now in Bangladesh) for a year. His future associate F.W. Savidge arrived in November 1891, and they met at an evangelical campaign at Brahmanbaria organised by the New Zealand Baptists. On their first attempt to enter Tripura they were bluntly denied by the ruler, Maharaja. Dejected they moved to Chittagong where they stayed for sometime awaiting permission to enter Lushai Hills. Since Lushai Hills was still under tribal chieftainships with constant warfare, their application was deferred and were allowed to stay at Kasalong village, the nearest possible location. Facing heavy shortage of food supply, they stayed there for a few months under constant hunger. Rangamati Commissioner had provided them with a rifle to defend themselves from any tribal insurgency. Unfortunately neither of them had any experience in shooting and could not even hit jungle fowls flogging around their hut. Then they suffered from severe dysentery. The medical doctor advised them to move to Darjeeling where a colder climate would revive them. After they recovered they stayed at Silchar for one whole year in 1893. Fortunately they could encounter some Mizo visitors from time to time, so that they could start learning their language. Finally a permit was issued and they immediately set off on Tlawng River in a canoe on Boxing Day of 1893.

Lorrain married Eleanor Atkinson in 1904. He died in London after ten years of his retirement, at the age of 73.

== Missionary work ==
=== Arthington Aborigines Mission ===
Lorrain and Savidge arrived in Aizawl on 11 January 1894 to be the first missionaries to Mizos. The day is now observed as public holiday as "Missionary Day" in the state. They made camp at Thingpui Huan Tlang ("tea garden"), MacDonald Hill, Zarkawt. The natives soon called Lorrain as Pu Buanga ("Mr. Grey", for his grey hairs), and Savidge as Sap Upa ("Old Mizo Sahib", as he was older of the two). They became known only be these new names among the Mizos. By March or April 1894, created the first Mizo alphabets based on Roman script. On 2 April 1894 they started a school. Suaka and Thangphunga became the first students, hence the first literate Mizos. However, the school was closed down in 1897 as the Arthington Mission was terminated. During their stay, they taught the Lusei tribes to read and write, translated Gospels (Gospel of Luke, Gospel of John) and Acts into Lusei language, and published A Grammar and Dictionary of the Luhsai Language in 1895.

=== Assam Frontier Pioneer Mission ===
In 1897 Arthington dissolved his mission, and handed over the mission field to Welsh Calvinistic Methodist Mission. Lorrain and Savidge were forced to return to England. After completing a short on medicine, they formed their own Assam Frontier Pioneer Mission, and they returned to India in 1899. On 16 June 1900 they arrived at Sadya, Assam (now in Arunachal Pradesh). They worked among Abors – Galo tribe and Adi people. They prepared A Dictionary of the ABOR-MIRI Language.

=== Baptist mission in southern Mizoram ===
In 1902, the Welsh Presbyterian Mission decided to split Mizoram into two mission fields, the northern and southern regions. Since mission was fledging well and the church was growing immensely, they handed the southern field to Baptist Missionary Society of London. The mission was funded under the share of Robert Arthington's will. The experienced and unemployed Baptist workers Savidge and Lorrain were immediately recruited. They arrived in Lunglei on 13 March 1903, greeted by several Christinized natives from the north. They settled at Serkawn. This marked the establishment of Baptist Church in Mizoram and Serkawn remains the centre of its administration to this day. For effective administration Savidge took up education and social works, while Lorrain pursued pastoral and translation works. They both got married during this period. In terms of statistics, evangelism in Mizoram the most successful in any BMS field in the 20th century. Between 1919 and 1924, the total Baptist community increased from 3,670 to 8,770, and church membership from 1,017 to 3,198.

=== Lakher Pioneer Mission ===
On reaching Lushai Hills, Lorrain wrote a letter to Reginald Arthur Lorrain, his younger brother, that "there is a great need of a 'wild tribe of head hunting' hills men which lay seven days' journey south of their present station, and who were known as the Lakhers, and for whom the Christian natives in Lushai Hills had been very definitely praying for sometime past, that a missionary might be sent to tell these people of the love of God and His Son, Jesus Christ." [sic] On receiving the letter and having decided to work as a missionary in Lakher 'country' [sic] (Lakherland), he approached the missionary societies already operating in those areas like Baptist Missionary Society (BMS) and Welsh Calvinistic Methodist Mission – later renamed to Welsh Presbyterian Mission. However, those missionary societies denied to extend their work to that remote region; thus, R.A. Lorrain founded the Lakher Pioneer Mission with the help of a missionary minded believers among his relatives and friends—R.A. Lorrain and his wife Maud Louisa Ulander arrived Calcutta (now Kolkata) on 16 February 1907 – James Herbert Lorrain and his wife who were in Calcutta in connection with BMS conference greeted them – they resumed their journey from Calcutta and reached Serkawn (Lunglei) on 15 March 1907, where J.H. Lorrain home was situated – in due course, R.A. Lorrain and his wife built their own mission bungalow, now called Lorrain Ville; thus, they laid the foundation of Christianity in Lakherland and first missionary station at Saikao village.

=== Progress of education ===
With assistance from Colonial British bureaucracy, the government schools and teaching staff of Aizawl division were transferred to Welsh Presbyterian Mission on 21 April 1904, while education of the Lunglei sub-division was transferred to BMSL with F.W. Savidge as the Honorary inspector. In spite of assistance, the progress of education field was very slow. In words of F.W. Savidge:

The parents do not yet see the need of education and the smallest excuse is sufficient for them to keep the children away. Those who have attended regularly have shown remarkable progress. No amount of persuasion to educate the girls seems to have any effect upon the parents, as girls are much too useful at home for general works.

Lorrain also remarked saying:

We have a very great difficulty in the South Lushai in obtaining pupils for our Girls Boarding School...Down here female education is regarded as being of very little worth compared with the works which the girls are able to do at home in helping their parents and apparently, it will be many years before public opinion alters very much.

=== Growth of church ===
In the first three decades of the 1900s, especially from 1919 to 1924, the church experienced phenomenal growth. Much of the credit goes to Lorrain and Savidge for their efforts to build on a small Christian community planted by Welsh Calvinistic missionaries. The efforts of missionaries and their education had a lasting effect on the Lushai tribes, and consequently submitted to conversion in large numbers, once their fear and dislike of aliens was overcome. By the time of Lorrain's retirement in 1932, the status of Mizoram as one of the most Christian states of modern India, was already anticipated. According to Lorrain:

A new day dawned upon the Lushai Hills, giving to the hardy inhabitants just the opportunity they needed to develop, their latent powers of heart and mind hitherto held in check by the deadening weight of the animistic belief and fears...The God blessed labour of many missionaries both Wales and English...has gradually through the years transformed this once wholly illiterate and semi-savage tribe into one of the most loyal, literate and progressive communities in Assam province.

The missionaries also laid the foundation for the development of indigenous leadership for the purpose of creating a wholly autonomous church. Their schools also imparted the prerequisite skills essential to function in the western world introduced through the British administration. In 1921, F.W. Savidge remarked on the success of mission education as:

Our old boys are to be found in all positions in their country. Among them are pastors, evangelists, schoolmasters, sub-assistant surgeons, dispensers, clerks, surveyors, soldiers and many others.

== Works ==
- The Lushai Grammar and Dictionary (with F.W. Savidge)
- A Grammar and Dictionary of the Lushai Language (with F.W. Savidge)
- Dictionary of the Lushai language
- A dictionary of the ABOR-MIRI language

== See also ==
- Hunterian transliteration
- Mara Evangelical Church
- Education in Mizoram
- Baptist Church of Mizoram
