= Senthang language =

Sino-Tibetan language spoken in Burma

Senthang
- Region: Myanmar
- Native speakers: 33,000 (2007)
- Language family: Sino-Tibetan: (Tibeto-Burman); Kuki-Chin-Mizo; Maraic; Senthang

Language codes
- ISO 639-3: sez
- Glottolog: sent1260

Senthang (Sethang Chin) is a Kuki-Chin-Mizo language of Myanmar. The Senthang dialects share 79% to 95% lexical similarity.

== Geographical distribution ==
Senthang is spoken in the following locations (Ethnologue).

- Hakha township, Chin State
- Thantlang township, Chin State (2 villages)
- Gangaw township, Magway Region (15 villages)
- Kalemyo township, Sagaing Region (2 villages)

VanBik (2009:55) lists the following Senthang villages: Buanlung, Bungluah, Bungzung, Chawncum, Cintlang, Dongva, Dumva, Hausen, Keizuan, Khuapi, Kyarinn, Langpho, Leium, Lichia, Lunghau, Lungrang, Lungtar, Phaipha, Phaizawng, Sakta, Sumsi, Surkhua, Zathal, Lungkhin, Dinlaupa, Leipi.

== Dialects ==
Ethnologue lists the following dialects of Senthang.

- Surkhua
- Sumsi
- Sakta
- Central Senthang (Bungzung, Khuapi, Lei-Um, Phaipha)
- Sonse
