= Zyphe language =

Kuki-Chin language spoken in Myanmar and India

Zyphe
- Region: Myanmar, India
- Ethnicity: Chin
- Native speakers: (20,000 cited 1994–2000)
- Language family: Sino-Tibetan: (Tibeto-Burman); Kuki-Chin; Maraic; Zyphe

Language codes
- ISO 639-3: zyp
- Glottolog: zyph1238

Zyphe (also spelled Zophei) is a Kuki-Chin language spoken primarily in Thantlang township, Chin State, Myanmar, and also spoken in India. It is spoken by 17,000 people in Myanmar and 3,000 in India. There are 2 dialects, east Zyphe and west Zyphe. A written script for Zyphe was created in 1998 by Rev. Dr. Ral Bawi and Prof. Kenneth Gregerson.
