= Mara language =

Sino-Tibetan language spoken in India and Burma

Mara
- Mara Reih (Tlosai)
- Pronunciation: [mərà]
- Native to: Mizoram, India; Burma
- Ethnicity: Mara people
- Native speakers: (Estimated over 400,000 (India, Myanmar, Malaysia, United States, and Australia) cited 1994–2026)
- Language family: Sino-Tibetan: Kuki-Chin; Maraic; Mara
- Writing system: Latin

Language codes
- ISO 639-3: mrh – inclusive code Individual code: shl – Shendu
- Glottolog: mara1382 shen1247 Shendu
- ELP: Mara

Mara (Mara: Mara reih, pronounced [mərà reɪ]; Burmese: မရာဘာသာစကား, pronounced [mərà bàθàzəɡá]) is a Kuki-Chin language spoken by Mara people, mostly the Tlosai tribe living in 30 villages of Chhimtuipui district, southern Mizoram, India; 9 villages in Thantlang District, Chin State, Burma; and several more in Matupi District, Chin State, Burma.

The Mara (Tlosai) languages belong to the Kuki-Chin branch of the Sino-Tibetan language family. The speakers of the languages are also known as Mara (Tlosais). Shendu is a colonial name.

Mara is a recognised language in the Mara Autonomous District Council (MADC) school curriculum. Mara is a compulsory subject for all schools up to class VII (middle school) under the Board of School Education, MADC.

== Written script ==
A written script for Mara was first created in 1852 by Captain S.R. Tickell. Further scripts were invented in 1869 by Captain T.H. Lewin, in 1908 by Rev. F.W. Savidge and by R.A. Lorain.

=== Mara alphabet (capital letters) ===
A, AW, Y, B, CH, D, E, F, H, I, K, L, M, N, NG, O, Ô, P, R, S, T, U, V, Z

=== Mara alphabet (lowercase letters) ===
a, aw, y, b, ch, d, e, f, h, i, k, l, m, n, ng, o, ô, p, r, s, t, u, v, z

=== Mara diphthongs ===
ao, yu, ai, ei, ia, ie, ua.

== Grammar ==
=== Plurals ===
The plural form of a noun is formed by affixing one of the following terms to the end of the noun:

- zy (zeu)
- zydua (zeu-dua)
- nawh
- sahlao (sha-hlawh)

Today the Mara language has its own alphabet; words inside brackets show author N.E. Parry's transliterations from 1937.

=== Interrogative words in Mara ===
- What: Khâpa, Khâpa e, Khâpa maw
- Where: Khataih lâ, Khataih liata
- How: kheihta, kheihawhta, Khatluta, Kheihta maw
- How much?: Khazie?
- How long?: Khachâ e, Khachâ maw?
- When: Khatita, Khatita e, Khâpa nota, nota, tita, nahta, pata Conj. thlaita, khati nota
- Why: Khazia, Khazia-e, Khazia maw, Khâpa vâta
- Why not: Khazia a châ vei chheih aw
- Whose: Kheihawhpa, Kheihawhpa he, Kheihawhpa-e, Kheihawhpa maw, ahy he maw
- Which: Kheihawhpa, Kheihawhpa he, Kheihawhpa-e, Kheihawhpa maw, ahy he maw
- Friend: Viasa
- Male Friend: Viasa Paw
- Female Friend: Viasa Nô
- Walk/Go: Sie (Phei ta Sie)
- Run: Arâ, â râ
- Sleep: Amô, Azia, Apazawh, â mô, â zia, â pazawh
- See: Mo, hmô
- Sit: Â tyuh, atyuh
- Stand: Â duah, aduah
- Jump: Â pathluah, apathluah
- Hit: Â chô, achô
- Eat: Nie
- Drink: Doh

=== Pronouns ===
Singular

- 1st person: keima, kei - I
- 2nd person: nâma, na - you
- 3rd person: ano, a or ama' - he, she, it

Plural

- 1st person: eima - we
- 2nd person: nâmo, nâma - you
- 3rd person: âmo - they

=== Possessive Pronouns ===
Singular

- Keima, ei - my
- Keima eih, kei eih - mine
- Nâma, na - thy (you)
- Nâma eih, na eih - thine (yours)
- Ama, a - him, her, it
- Ama eih, a eih - his, hers, its

Plural

- Keimo - our
- Keimo eih - ours
- Nâmo - your
- Ahyrai - anyone
- Ahy tlyma - someone, a certain one
- A tlâhpi - some . . . others
- A hropa - another, others
- Ama zydua ta - all

== Phonology ==
=== Consonants ===
		Labial	Dental/ Alveolar	(Alveolo-) palatal	Velar	Glottal
Plosive/ Affricate	voiceless	p	t	tɕ	k	(ʔ)
Plosive/ Affricate	aspirated	pʰ	tʰ	tɕʰ	kʰ	
Plosive/ Affricate	voiced	b	d	dʑ		
Fricative	voiceless	f	s			h
Fricative	voiced	v	z			
Nasal	plain	m	n		ŋ	
Nasal	murmured	mʰ	nʰ			
Trill	voiced		r			
Trill	voiceless		r̥			
Lateral	voiced		l			
Lateral	voiceless		l̥			
Approximant		w	ɹ̥	j		

- A glottal stop [ʔ] may occur in onsets as a result of morphological combinations.
- /t/ can be dental as [t̪] before /ɑ/ or /i/.
- /k/ can also be heard as uvular [q] before /ɑ/ or /i/.
- /s, z/ when preceding /i/ can be heard as alveolo-palatal [ɕ, ʑ].
- Pre-aspiration can also be heard among nasals as [ʱm, ʱn].

=== Vowels ===
	Front		Central	Back
Close	i	y	ɨ	u
Close	i̞			u̞
Mid	e	ø		o
Open				ɑ̝
Open			ɑ	

- Sounds /o/ and /ɑ̝/ can be heard in free variation as [ɔ, ɐʊ] and [ʌ].
