= Maraland =

Autonomous District Council in Mizoram state, India

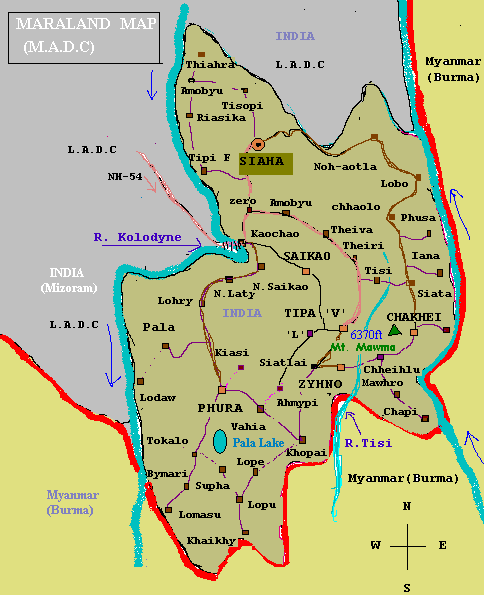
Map of Maraland

Maraland is a region in the southeastern part of Mizoram state, India. The region is one of the three Autonomous District Councils in the state.

== See also ==
- Mara Thyutlia Py
