= Thantlang Township =

Thantlang Township ထန်တလန်မြို့နယ် Thantlang Township
- Township
- Location in Hakha district (in red)
- Country: Burma
- State: Chin State
- District: Hakha District
- Capital: Than Tlang

Population (2008)
  - Total: 56,323
- Time zone: UTC+6:30 (MST)

Thantlang Township (Burmese: ထန်တလန်မြို့နယ်) is one of the nine townships in Chin State.

A variety of languages and different accents are spoken in Thantlang township, including Lautu, Zophei, Senthang, Lai and Lochei and Sizo. The western border of the township that separates it from India is formed by the Tiau River from the north, and the Kaladan River (known locally as the Boinu/Beino/Chhimtuipui River) from the south which flow together at 22°47′10″N 93°05′45″E.

== History ==
"Thlantlang" means cemetery mountain. Prior to 1995, there were many old cemeteries on the south side of the mountain above the main town, where subsequently the Burmese military build a camp and a pagoda. Briefly, in the early 2000s, a small piece of northeastern Thantlang Township, namely the village tracts of: Lungding, Tikhuangtum, Tlangkhua, Tlangpi, Tlangte, northern Vanzang (Farrawn), and Zangtlang, was transferred to Falam Township. However, in 2008, in the reorganization of Chin State townships, these village tracts were restored.

== Borders ==
Thantlang Township borders on:

- Mizoram State of India to the west and north;
- Falam Township to the northeast;
- Matupi Township to the south; and
- Hakha Township to the east

Thantlang is the administrative town of inclusive nine circles (also called mountain ranges) attributed to the geographical and dialectical arrangements of the area. They are Khualhring Tlang (Khualhring circle), Vanzang Tlang (Vanzang circle), Zahnak Tlang (Zahnak circle), Bual Tlang (Bual circle), Vailam Tlang ( Vailam circle ) Lautu Tlang (Lautu circle), Mara Tlang (Mara circle), Vailam Tlang (Vailam circle), Zophei Tlang (Zophei circle) and Bawipa Tlang (Bawipa circle). Only four circles speak Lai dialect. Zophei (Zophei and Bawipa circles), Lautu (Lautu circle), HawThai (Mara circle) speak their tribal language. The other five circles and in Thantlang town speak Lai dialect, which is the commonly use dialect in the township.

== Communities ==
Thantlang is the major town in the township, with four smaller towns (larger villages) Leitak, Lungler (Lonle in Burmese transliteration), Hnaring (main town of Lutuv people) and Ngaphepi (biggest village of the HawThai tribe). Lungler and Leitak have 16-bed hospitals (clinics). There are 37 village tracts and 76 villages in Thantlang Township.
