= Mara people =

Ethnic group of India and Myanmar

Mara people (Lakher)
Mara Chipho
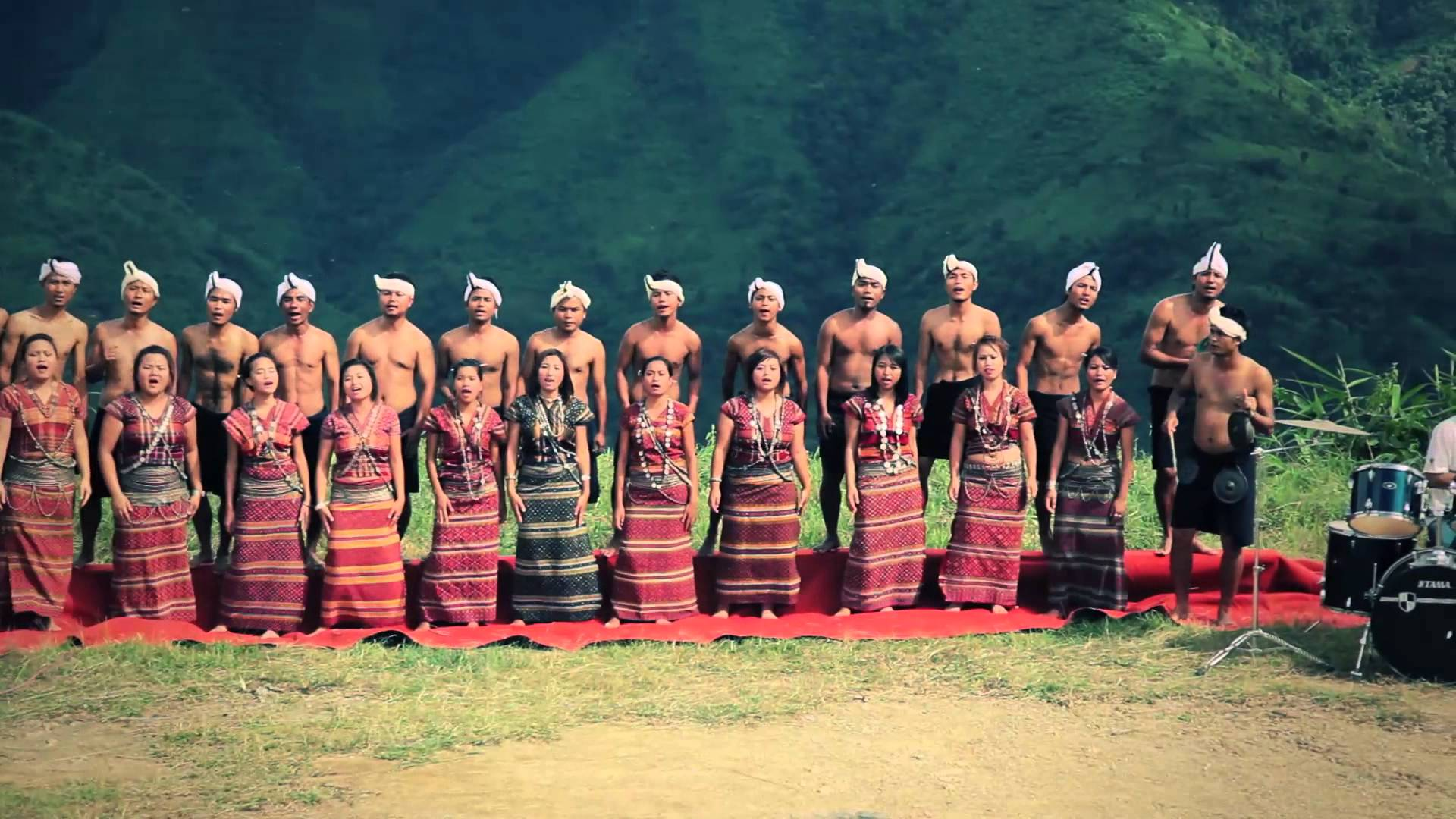

Total population
- Estimated over 100,000 (India, Myanmar, Malaysia, United States, and Australia) (2011)

Regions with significant populations
- India (Mizoram); Myanmar (Chin State)

Languages
- Mara; Maraic languages; Mizo; Burmese

Religion
- Christianity

The Mara (Mara: Mara Chipho, pronounced [mərà tʃipʰaʊ]; Burmese: မရာလူမျိုး, pronounced [mərà lùmyo]), also historically known as Lakher, are an ethnic group native to Mizoram, India, and Chin State, Myanmar.

== Ethnonyms ==
While the community refers to themselves as Mara, various exonyms have been used by neighboring tribes and colonial authorities. The Lushei referred to them as Lakher. Early British records called them Shendu before adopting the Lushei term. They were also called "Yo" (Zo) by the British, presumably learned from the Lai.

== Geography ==
Maraland is divided between India and Myanmar, straddling the international border.

=== West Maraland ===
West Maraland lies in Mizoram, India. It constitutes a distinct administrative region with its own Siaha district and enjoys autonomy through the Mara Autonomous District Council.

=== East Maraland ===
East Maraland is located in Chin State, Myanmar. It is divided into two main districts: Thantlang District (locally known as "Chha Mara") and Matupi District ("Fei Mara").

==== Thantlang District ====
There are 9 Mara villages in the Thantlang District: Locheipi (Lungcawipi), Locheita (Luncawite), Ngephepi (Ngaphaipi), Ngepheta (Ngaphaite), Lodao (Inhmunpi), Meisakotla (Fartlang), Khipilu (Khuapilu), Lelai (Lailen) and La-ao (Lau).

==== Matupi District ====
There are several more Mara villages in the Matupi District, namely: Tylai, Lochei (Luncawi), Dawlei (Teikae), Fabau(Sabyh), Khihlo (Khihlo Vasaih), Lialaipi (Lailenpi), Lialaita (Lailente), Sosai (Sungsen), Poitia (Pintia), Aru, Taubu, Teina, Chakhai, Pamai, Satu, Pasei, New Pasei, Mala and Hlomâ.

== History ==
=== Early migrations ===
The Mara people are believed to have migrated from the north due to searching for new settlement and by pressure from the east. Tlosai(Tlongsai) groups initially settled between Leitak and Leisai, eventually crossing the Kaladan River and establishing a settlement in Phusa in the Lushai Hills. From Phusa, they moved to Bykhi, where two subgroups—the Siaha and Saikao Tlongsais—emerged, each establishing new settlements named Siaha and Saikao, respectively.From Saikao and Siaha, they found new villages such as Tokalo,Amobyu, Laty, Pala, Amotlah, Thiahra, Tisopi etc . Hawthai groups, whose main village is Tisi, originated at a place called Chira in Halkha, whence came via Siata, Paimi, Niawtlang to Tisi. From Tisi , they found new villages such as Noaotla, Chhaolo ,Lobo, Theiva. Zyhno groups origanated at Hnaro in Hakha. They crossed Kaladan river and settled at their present sites today. Chapi groups origanated from Thlatla and latter migrated successively to their present sites today such as Chapi, Mawhro, Chakhei etc. Vyhtu groups, origanated near Haka, settled at Siata and Iana. It is estimated that the Mara have been settled in the Lushai Hills for approximately 300 to 400 years. (Note: Parry's book was published in 1924 and referred to the migration as occurring 200–300 years prior.)

== See also ==
- Mara language
