= Zanniat =

Chin ethnic group

The Zanniat tribe are people of western Myanmar (Burma) who are a sub-group of the Chin peoples. The Zanniat tribe has fifty-seven sub-groupings and clans. The group's existence was recorded (along with three of its many sub-groups) in Burma's 1931 census after being absent in the Chin Hills gazette of 1896. In 1943, the Zanniat tribal groups of eastern Falam Township were recorded by Henry Stevenson (b. 1903, British colonial service in Burma). The Zanniat may also be known by similar sounding names such as Zahnyiet, Zanniet, Zanngiat and Zannaing.

== Geography ==
The capital city or myo (IPA: mjó) of the Zanniat is Webula. The Zanniat tribal lands stretch from the hilly regions around the eastern part of the Manipur river to the plains of the Sagaing region and fall within Falam Township. The Manipuri River, flowing in a south-easterly direction within the Falam township, makes a clear natural boundary of Zanniat lands. The Zanniat tribal land abuts Ngawn tribal land and the Tedim township in the north The land has thick vegetation with fauna. Forests within the area include the Khuanghlum, Lianthar, and Ngalsip forests. The lands encompass thirty-nine villages and towns.

=== Towns and villages in Zanniatland ===
1. Congkua
2. Darbo
3. Farso (new Lunghawh)
4. Haitui (inexistence)
5. Hiangrun (Khua ngaingai)
6. Hlanzawl (new Khualai)
7. Hmunli
8. Kamunchuang (Cang-ai-va)
9. Kawlfang
10. Khitam
11. Khualai
12. Khuaval
13. Khumzing
14. Khupleng
15. Kimniang
16. Kuangdon (inexistence)
17. Lianrih
18. Locom
19. Lumbang
20. Lumte
21. Lunghawh
22. Maihol
23. Mualzawl (later included into greater Webula town)
24. Murang
25. Ngaizam
26. Nimzawl (also new Nimzawl village founded)
27. Pamunchuang
28. Ralum
29. Simcing
30. Thanghluang
31. Thawi/Tuphei/Zo (new Lunghawh village)
32. Thiamthi
33. Tidil (inexistance)
34. Tlangphai (also known as Kulzam village)
35. Tlortang
36. Tlorzan
37. Tulung (inexistance)
38. Vanniam
39. Webula
40. Zalang
41. Zatual
42. Zultu

== Language ==
Zanniat is one of the Sino-Tibetan languages. Ethnologue lists Zanniat as one of the dialects of Falam language.

== History ==
Zanniat are the descendants of Zanniat. Zanniat was one of the sons of Chin Lung/ Chin Dung, a Shan Sawbwa (Saopha) of Kalemyo, whose father was Kale Kyitaungnyu, the ruler of Ava kingdom of Burma (Myanmar). Zanniat, Hlawnceu and Thuankai were three brothers who left Kalay or Vingpui (meaning fort in Zanniat language) due to conflict, then moved to higher elevation, which later became known as the Chin Hills. Zanniat decided to settle down in Runral (The word "Runral" refers to the other side of a river in Zanniat language), a land which is east of the Manipur River, and it became Locom village and the name Locom means to settle in the Zanniat language. Some of Zanniat's sons were Phunnim, Sumthang, Laizo, Siahthang, Zanniat (Niat Hang) and the descendants from each son later became clans and families. Thuankai had two sons, named Hlawn Ceu and Phurh Hlum. Phurh Hlum had two wives. The descendants from Phurh Hlum's first wife are known as Nuhma family, meaning previous or first in Zanniat language. Phurh Hlum had a second wife from Locom village and the descendants from his second wife are later known as Nuhnua family, meaning later or second in the Zanniat language. One of Phurh Hlum sons was named as Zanniat, to commemorate the great-grandfather Zanniat and the descendants from this man are later known as the Zanniat clan or family, which later caused conflicts in understanding the origin of Zanniat. The descendants comprising Zanniat and Phurh Hlum, living on the eastern side of the Manipur River, are commonly known as the Zanniat people or the Zanniat tribe. Among the sons of Zanniat, Laizo descendants live around Lumbang, while Sumthang descendants live around Webulah, Hluansang descendants are Chiefly clans that settle in every Central Chin and Maraic tribal villages and in India (Mizoram) and Bangladesh (Chittagong hills tracts. Taisun [Tashon], Lerngo (Hualngo), Torr and Khualsim tribes also later settled with Zanniat tribe. Zanniat people trace their ancestry to the Chin, of Tibeto-Burman descent from origins in Mongolia. The early Chin people settled in the western plains of Sagaing when it was known as "Kauka" or "Vingpui", and later as "Kale". The word "Vingpui" refers to a type of brick fort. Thuankai had a son named Tlaisun (Tashons people) in English) who later became one of the strongest tribe, the founder of Falam or Fahlam, ruling most parts of Chin hills.

=== Taisun [Tashon] rule ===
In 1810 A.D., the Taisun tribe collaborated with Zokhua and Chuncung villages and attacked and Khualai village of Zanniat tribe resulting in the whole Zanniat tribe and the land becoming under the rule of Taisun.

=== British rule ===
The British ruled Burma from 1824 to 1948. Traditionally, Zanniat culture emphasized the importance of the rule of the head of a group of any size, from household to nation. The Zanniat did not adapt to British rule and operated a Pau Chin Hau governance avoiding centralised rule or local puppet chiefs.

== Religion ==
Traditionally, Zanniat people believed in the existence of a supernatural being called "Pathian". The people also believed in other spiritual beings known as "Khuazing", to whom they offered sacrifices in return for favours and blessings. People also believed in the existence of bad spiritual beings and demons such as "Khawsia".

The first Protestant Christian missionaries reached the Chin Hills on 15 March 1899. They were American Baptist workers, Laura and Arthur Carson. In 1906, Thang Tsin became the first Christian among Zanniat people. Roman Catholic missionaries arrived later.
