= Webula =

Coordinates: 23.0861°N 93.9167°E

- Location in Burma
- Country: Burma
- Division: Chin State
- District: Falam District
- Township: Falam Township

Population (2014)
  - Total: 1,041
  - Religions: Christianity
- Time zone: UTC+6.30 (MST)

Webula is a village in Falam Township, Falam District Chin State, Myanmar, 30 kilometres (18.6 mi) east of the town of Falam on the Tedim Road.
