= Battle of Falam =

2025 capture of Falam by Myanmar rebels

- Part of the Chin theater in the Myanmar civil war
| Date | First phase:9 November 2024 – 8 April 2025 (4 months, 4 weeks and 2 days) Second phase:October 2025– 25 April 2026 (6 months, 1 week and 5 days) |
| Location | Falam, Myanmar 22°55′00″N 93°40′30″E |
| Result | First phase: Rebel victory Second phase: Junta forces fully recaptured Falam |
| Territorial changes | Junta forces secured Kale–Taingen–Falam–Hakha road and enable to reopen supply line to Chin frontline |

Belligerents
| State Administration Council | Chin Brotherhood: Chin National Defence Force; PDF Zoland; CDF Mindat; CDF Kanpelet; Other Allied Groups: 96 Soldiers PDF; Anti-Fascist Internationalist Front; Myanmar Royal Dragon Army; Burmese Revolutionary Technical Front; Generation Z Army; Giant Revolution Force; Harmonious Northern Brother; Kalay Revolution Force; Kalay Urban Guerrilla; Myingyan Black Tiger; National Liberation Army (Myanmar); Revolution Ambulance Wolf; Sagaing Federal Troop; Yaw Defense Force; Zo Army |

Strength
| ~400+ | ~600+ |

Casualties and losses
| Unknown 100+ captured | 89 killed 500+ wounded |

The Battle of Falam (also named "Mission Jerusalem") was an offensive conducted by the Chin Brotherhood Alliance, along with other anti-junta resistance forces, to capture the Chin State town of Falam during the Myanmar civil war. The battle was reported to be the first major battle resulting in the capture of a town without on-the-ground participation from ethnic armed organizations established before the 2021 phase of the civil war.

== Background ==
Falam is the second-largest city in Chin State and a former state capital. It is strategically located on the route between the junta’s Regional Operations Command in Kale (Sagaing Region) and Hakha (Chin State).

By late 2024, rebels claimed control of approximately 85% of Chin State, with Falam remaining one of the last junta strongholds in the region.

== Battle ==
The battle began on November 9, 2024 when the Chin Brotherhood Alliance, comprising the Zomi Federal Union, Chin National Organization, Mindat Chin National Council, Maraland and Kampelet Chin Defense Forces, and Matupi CDF Brigade 1, launched Operation Chin Brotherhood.

The CNDF which is a component of the CBA is also engaged and is supported by allied resistance groups, including units reportedly assisted by the Arakan Army (AA) from Rakhine State.

On November 9, CBA forces launched coordinated attacks on junta strongholds in Falam, targeting the police station, General Administration Department, Department of Construction, and Hospital Hill. The rebels also blockaded supply routes to the town, effectively isolating Infantry Battalion 268. In response, the junta carried out heavy airstrikes, using warplanes, drones, and artillery to defend its positions.

By mid-November, the CBA had taken control of the police station and administrative offices, leaving Battalion 268 as the last significant junta holdout. Around 45 junta soldiers surrendered during this phase, and the rebels have captured approximately 130 prisoners of war since the offensive began.

Residents reported that the junta’s air force dropped over 150 bombs on Falam on a single day (Saturday) in mid-November, targeting rebel positions and civilian areas. Over the course of a week, the total number of bombs dropped exceeded 500. A Christian church in nearby Thalanzar village was damanged and over 10,000 residents were displaced to nearby villages, Kalay Township, Yangon, and India’s Mizoram state.

By December 2024, the CBA claimed to have seized 90% of Falam Township, with junta forces confined to Battalion 268.

On March 11, 2025, the junta launched a counteroffensive to break the siege, sending 40–50 soldiers to reinforce Battalion 268. The CNDF reported that the junta’s reliance on airstrikes showed its inability to mount effective ground operations due to depleted ranks and low morale.

On April 8, 2025, the Chin Brotherhood Alliance and allied forces succeeded to captured Infantry Battalion 268 (IB-268), the last remaining junta stronghold in Falam.

== Aftermath ==
The junta responded to the capture by deploying daily airstrikes with various aircraft, such as jet fighters and Mi-35 helicopters, to regain control over Falam but failed.

On 25 April 2026, Tatmadaw troops regained control of Falam. The Chinland Council attributed Myanmar Air Force strikes as contributing to the recapture.

The Tatmadaw engaged in a total of 109 major and minor clashes with the insurgents to retake Falam township and the surrounding area, capturing 19 bodies, 33 weapons, ammunition, and related equipment from the Chin Brotherhood alliance. Some Tatmadaw officers and soldiers casualties were reported according to the government press release.

== See also ==
- Ngape clashes
- Battle of Maungdaw
- Battle of Laukkai
