= Simpi, Myanmar =

Village in Chin State, Myanmar

Coordinates: 22°49′N 93°45′E

Simpi is a village in the Rallawn Village Tract in Falam Township, Falam District, Chin State, Myanmar, about 13 kilometres (8 mi) south-east of the town of Falam.
