= Zinghmuh =

Mountain in Chin State, Myanmar

- Zinghmuh Tlang
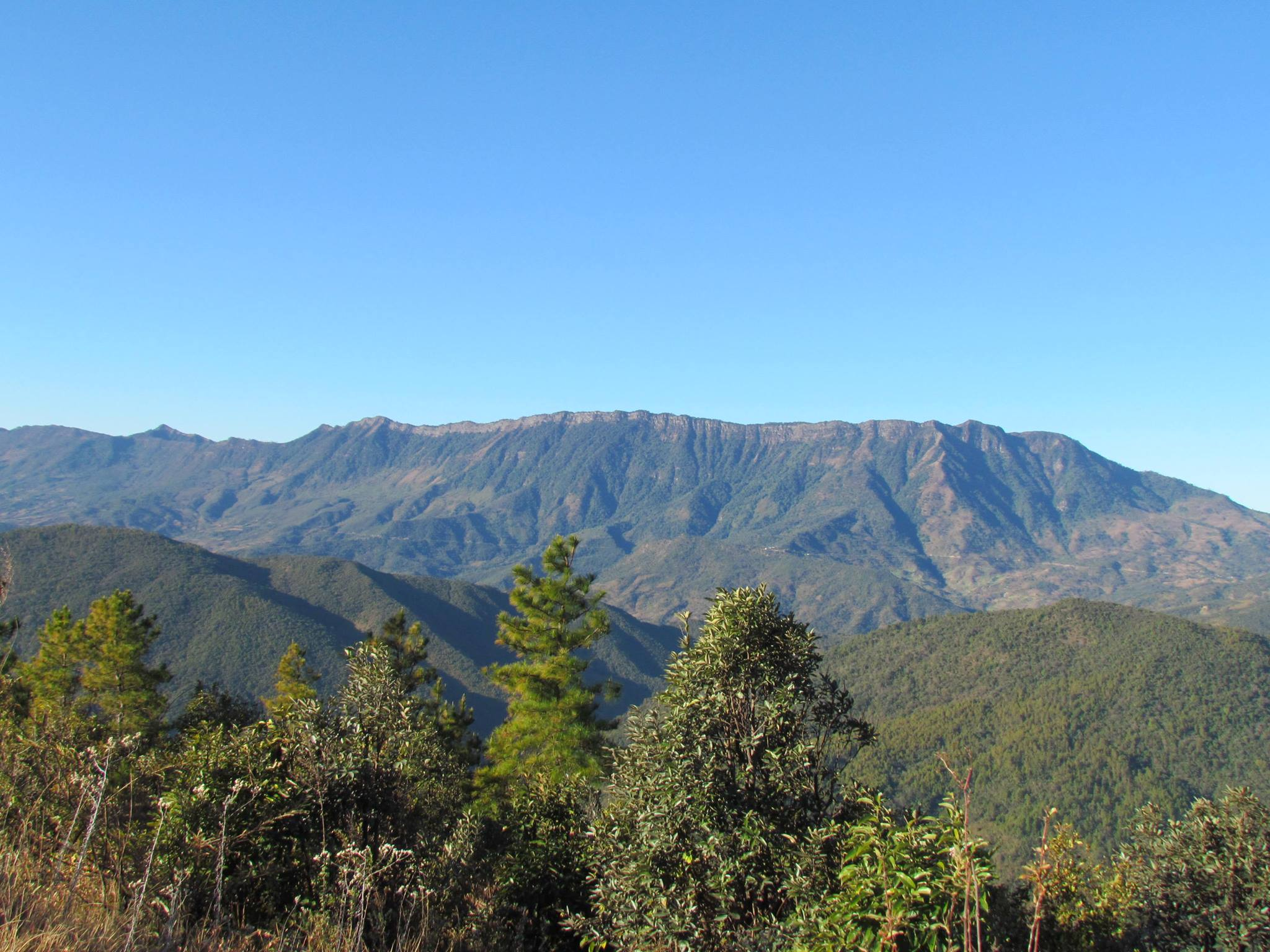
- Zinghmuh Mountain Range

Highest point
- Elevation: 2,564.5 m (8,414 ft)
- Listing: Ultra
- Coordinates: 22°47′1.6″N 93°32′53.67″E

Geography
- Location within Myanmar
- Location: Falam Township, Chin State, Burma
- Parent range: Chin Hills

Mt. Zinghmuh is a prominent mountain that ranges from Chunchung village in Hakha Township and Ramthlo village in Falam Township, Chin State. The highest peak of the range located directly above Ramthlo village is recorded as 2,564.5 m (8,414 ft) above sea level making it the third highest peak in Chin State, Myanmar, after Mt. Khonumthung (10,016 ft) and Mt. Kennedy (8,868 ft).

== Location ==
Mt. Zinghmuh lies exactly halfway between the city of Falam and Hakha. It is 22 miles away from both cities. At the foot of this great mountain, there is a village called Ramthlo where many hikers used as base.

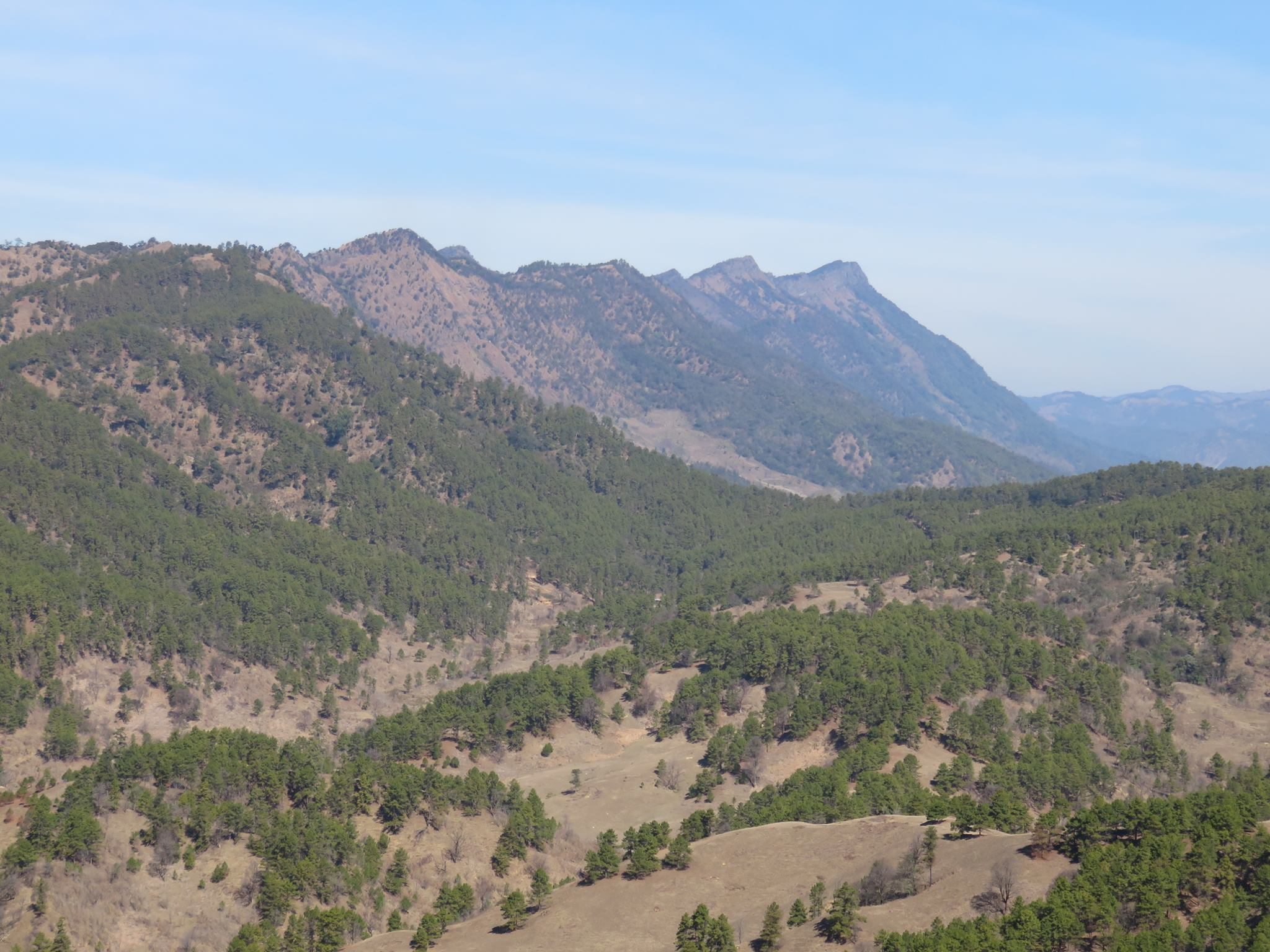
View of Zinghmuh mountain range

== Name ==
Legend has it that a man named Ram To and his wife first settled in the region circa. AD 1500. Ram To and his wife had migrated to the region from Burma, started building families and community in a place called Faifa. One day, a major landslide killed the whole community except Za Sum and his sister. They were devastated by the loss of their parent and the whole community. When they woke up the next morning, the first thing they see was the beautiful mountain of Zinghmuh which gave them hope and inspiration to live on. When they wake up in the morning, the first thing they see was this mountain. Thus, the mountain is named Zing Hmuh. Zing in a local dialect means "morning" and hmuh means "see". It can be translated as the mountain that can be seen every morning.

It is also said that the meaning of Zinghmuh is that "a place where we see the gods". Circa. AD1450, the people of Ramthlo settled in a place called "Faifa". While the men were hunting and resting near a lake called "Lai", they saw a big woman like human on top of the mountain. The next morning they prepared to go home and they took sugarcane from the lake for their children. They started their journey towards home, however, they could not reach home and came to the lake again and again. They believed that the gods from the mountain did not like them taking the sugarcane, therefore, they returned all of their sugarcane where they took it. After this, they all manage to go home. That night a villager had a dream. In his dream the god from mountain came to him and said "My father’s name is Tluang Hnin. My mother’s name is Rai Sia". The next day the Ramthlo villagers discussed about what they saw on the mountain and the dream and came to a conclusion that gods were dwelling on top of that mountain. Also, during the era of Pu Za Sum, the Ramthlo villager named Pu Lian Kar lost his beloved wife. He was stricken by grief and went to the top of this mountain hoping to contact with the spirit of his wife. When he got to the mountain he saw a large man like human and asked him "What are you doing here Lian Kar .. Please go back to the village". Pu Lian Kar was so afraid and went back to the village and told the Ramthlo villagers. Pu Lian Kar experienced had reinforced the belief that gods were dwelling on the mountain. Therefore, the Ramthlo villagers named the mountain as "Zing Hmuh". The god is locally called as "Khaw Zing" and the meaning of the mountain is that a place we see the gods or the abode of the gods. Since then, the mountain has been known as Mt. Zing Hmuh.

== Ancient cult and rituals ==
Mt. Zinghmuh was once the Chin people's favourite place for cults and worshipping gods/ spirits. It was also a highway for the souls of the dead people on their way to the dead village, locally known as Mithi Khua. Before Christianity came to Chin Hills, the Chin people believed that the souls of the dead went to a place called the city of dead i.e. Mithi Khua. It was believed that the souls of the dead had to pass along the imaginary street of Zinghmun mountain range. It was an imaginary street for living people because mortal people could not see it.

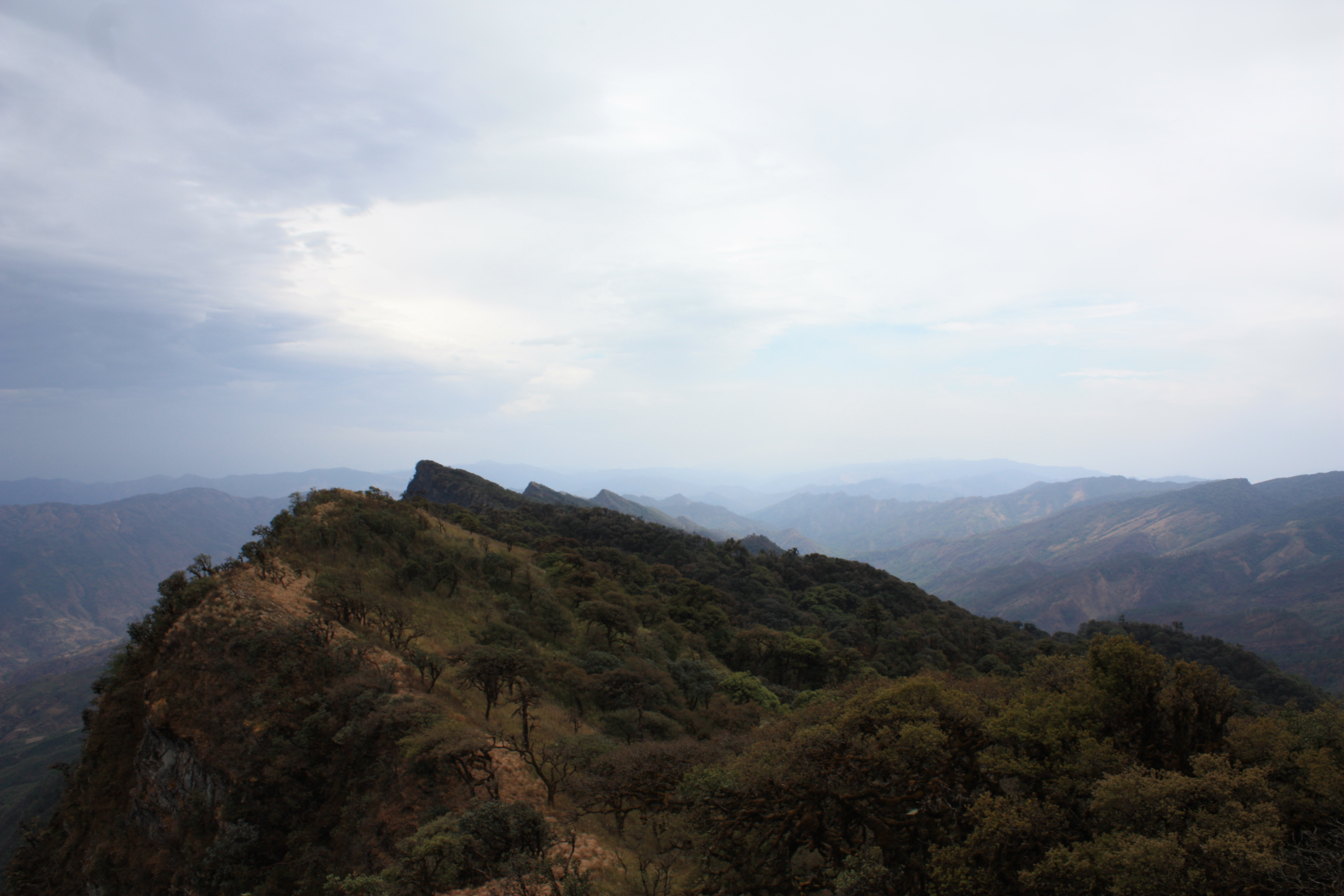
Zinghmun Range taken from the ridge

Mt. Zinghmuh also served as the abodes of the gods known as Zinghmuh, Lur, Hmar and Mehrol. Rituals was practiced to secure good cultivations, rain etc.... Rituals include the offering of 1 Mithun every three years and 1 Pig every year.

== Dar Luan and Lal Ruang folklore ==
The folklore related with this sacred mountain being a highway for the souls of the dead on their way to Mikhi Khua is known as Dar Luan and Lal Ruang. This folklore is being passed from generation to generation. There was once a powerful village chief near Mt. Zinghmuh. He had a beautiful teenage daughter called Dar Luan. His wife was pregnant at that time and he hope that a son would be born to him to inherit his wealth and status. One day, his beloved daughter suddenly fell ill and died. He was stricken with grief so much so that he could not even eat. He knew that her soul would pass along the ridge of the Mt. Zinghmuh after ten days of her actual death. It was the belief of Chin people that the soul of a dead person stays on earth for ten days and then after that goes to Mithi Khua.

On the night of the 10th day, he went to Mt. Zinghmuh and hid himself in a place where he considered to be the most likely places traversed by Dead Soul's Highway. He also placed some ashes on the path so that he could see the foot print of her daughter. Some hours after nightfall, he heard the sound of khingte i.e. "the string of tiny ornamental brass bells worn by Chin girls around their hip and ankles", coming toward him from one direction. He quickly recognized that it was the ringing of his daughter's khingte as he always heard them when she used to walk briskly when she was alive. The sounds came nearer and nearer to him but he could not see his daughter, nor could he see anything. When the sound reached the spot on the pass where he had spread a layer of ash, he saw a footprint which he quickly recognized as the footmarks of his daughter. Just before the ringing of khingte disappeared, he sprang from his hiding place and gripped the empty air. But instead of catching his daughter, he had caught a huge and fearsome caterpillar, the size of a human. Being in his arms, and the big caterpillar was struggling to free itself from his grip. But knowing that it was his daughter he refused to let go his grip, but held it still firmer. A moment later, the caterpillar turned itself into a huge serpent. Though, the serpent tried to free itself from his grip while at the same time trying to strangle him the man continued to tighten his grip. At last, realizing that there was no use in continuing the struggle, the serpent turned itself into his daughter Dar Luan.

"My dearest Dar Luan, I have caught you. You must come back to me" said the man.

"Daddy, that is impossible. You know that I have died. And the only thing left for me is to go to Mithi Khua" Dar Luan replied.

"My dearest daughter, either you must come back to me and your mother, or I will die here myself and follow you to Mithi Khua" replied the man.

"Daddy, I will tell you what we must do. Since, I have died it is absolutely impossible for me to return to you and my mother. But I will tell you of one thing that will make you very happy. In a few days my mother will give birth to a son whom you shall name Lal Ruang. This Lal Ruang will grow up to be a great warrior, a great hunter, and a great ruler, and his fame will spread to all the corners of Chinland. His worth to you will be greater than thirty big villages. Rejoice that you will be the father of such a great son. As for me, I must go on and proceed to Mithi Khua. Since living persons and dead persons cannot live together again, there is nothing that we can do, but part company" said Dar Luan.

"My beloved daughter, I would rather have you back than all the riches on earth. But since you say that it is impossible, so be it" said the man.

He then reluctantly released his grip. His daughter vanished before his eyes. He could now see her footmarks going away from him while at the same time hearing the ringing of her khingte. Her footprints went further and further away until he could see them no more. The ringing of her khingte also went farther and further away until he could hear them no more. Broken hearted, the man returned home. On the very night he reached his house, his wife gave birth to a son. Following the last instructions of their departed, they named him Lal Ruang. Lal Ruang became a great ruler.

== White cross ==
Now, the religion of Chin State is predominately Christian and cross became an important symbol for the region. A white cross now stands at its peak erected by the people of Falam and Ramthlo. Christians hold prayer services annually on and near the mountain.

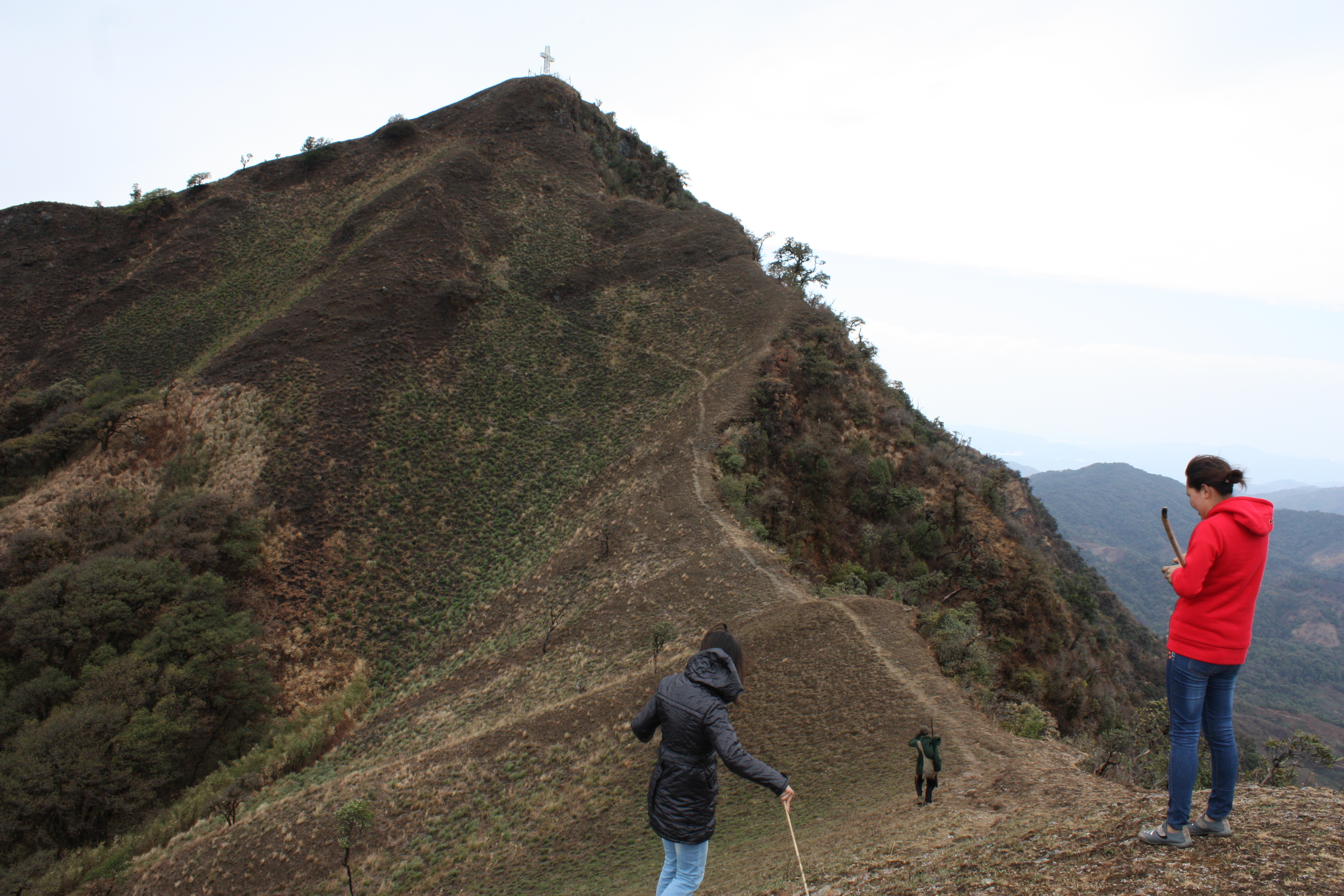
The peak of Mt. Zinghmuh

=== Survey ===
The elevation of 8,414 ft (2564.5m) was first determined by the British surveyors after the colonization of Chin Hills in 1890. During the survey, mules were used to transport supplies and materials to mark the elevation.

== Route description ==
=== Ascending ===
It can be ascended directly from Ramthlo village to the peak of the Mt. Zinghmuh. There is only one path leading to its peak which is clearly visible. The path is mainly used by hunters and locals to find woods, flowers and forest products. A steady climb until the ridge of the Mr.Zinghmuh. Just before hitting the ridge, there is a short section of cliff which is quite difficult to overcome as the cliff can be slippery. From the ridge, Hualngo Hills, Zahau Hills, Hakha District and nearby villages such as Ramthlo, Tlangzar, Dokthek can be seen. The wind can be so strong at the ridge which is 8000 ft above sea level. After the ridge, the peak of Zinghmuh with a white Cross can be seen. Along with the cross, a path is clearly visible from a distance. The distance is approximately 1.5miles from Ramthlo village to its peak. With a decent pace, it could take 2–3 hours.

=== Descending ===
Some people returned to the village following the ascended route. Many people continued to walk past the peak towards Laiva Dam and come to the village of Tlangzar. The distance is approximately 4–5 miles.

== Memorials stones ==
Mt. Zinghmuh in the northern Chin State has many different plant species and a 360-degree view of Chin Hills. There are many small memorial stones across the mountain ranges created by those who have visited.

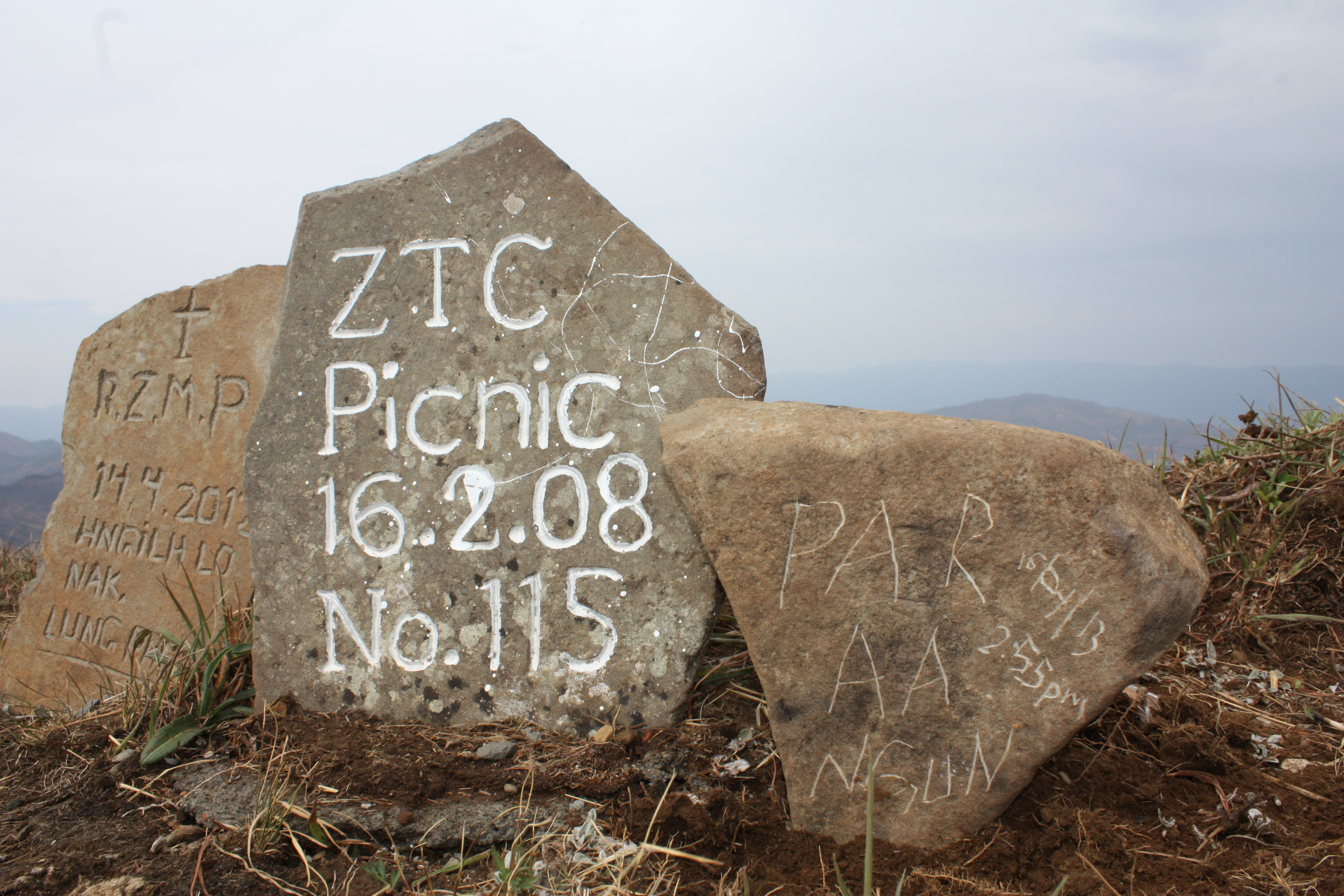
Memorial stones near the White cross

== Flora ==
Zinghmuh mountain is relative rich in flora and fauna. The mountain is home to a beautiful rhododendron, locally known as sokhlei and known by the Burmese as taungzalat. The species found on Zinghmuh mountain is known as R. forrestii. The white rhododendron can also be found near the peak. A light blue colour shape like a ball, locally known as bingbi flower, flooded the hills around April and May time. There are also many type of orchids in the mountain which the local sell it to Burma. The most famous plant on the mountain is Bergenia ligulata, known by the Burmese as natsay gamone (နတ္ေဆးဂမုန္း). Trading this species has been the main source of income for many locals.

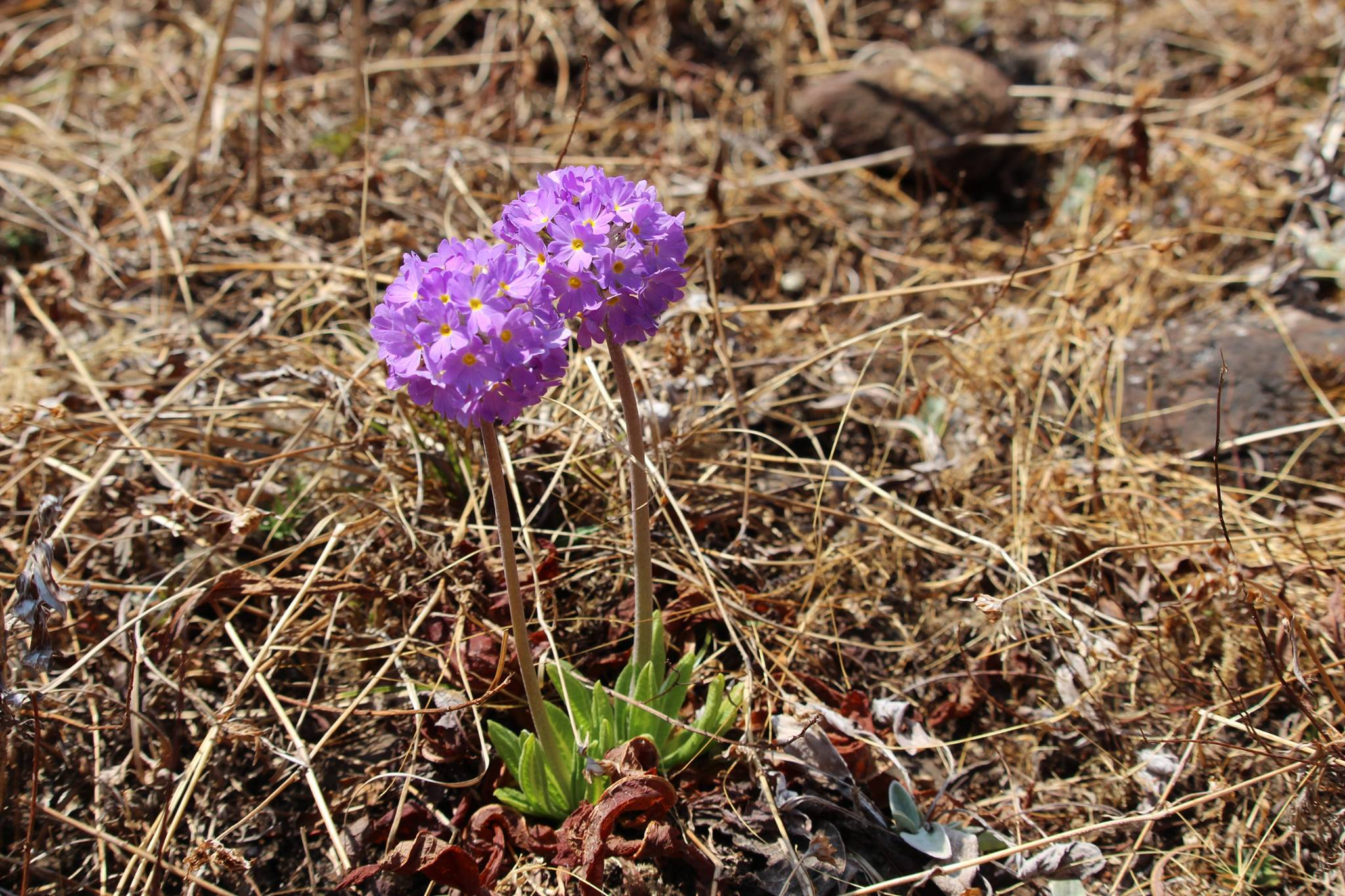
Bingbi flower found on Zinghmuh Mountain Range

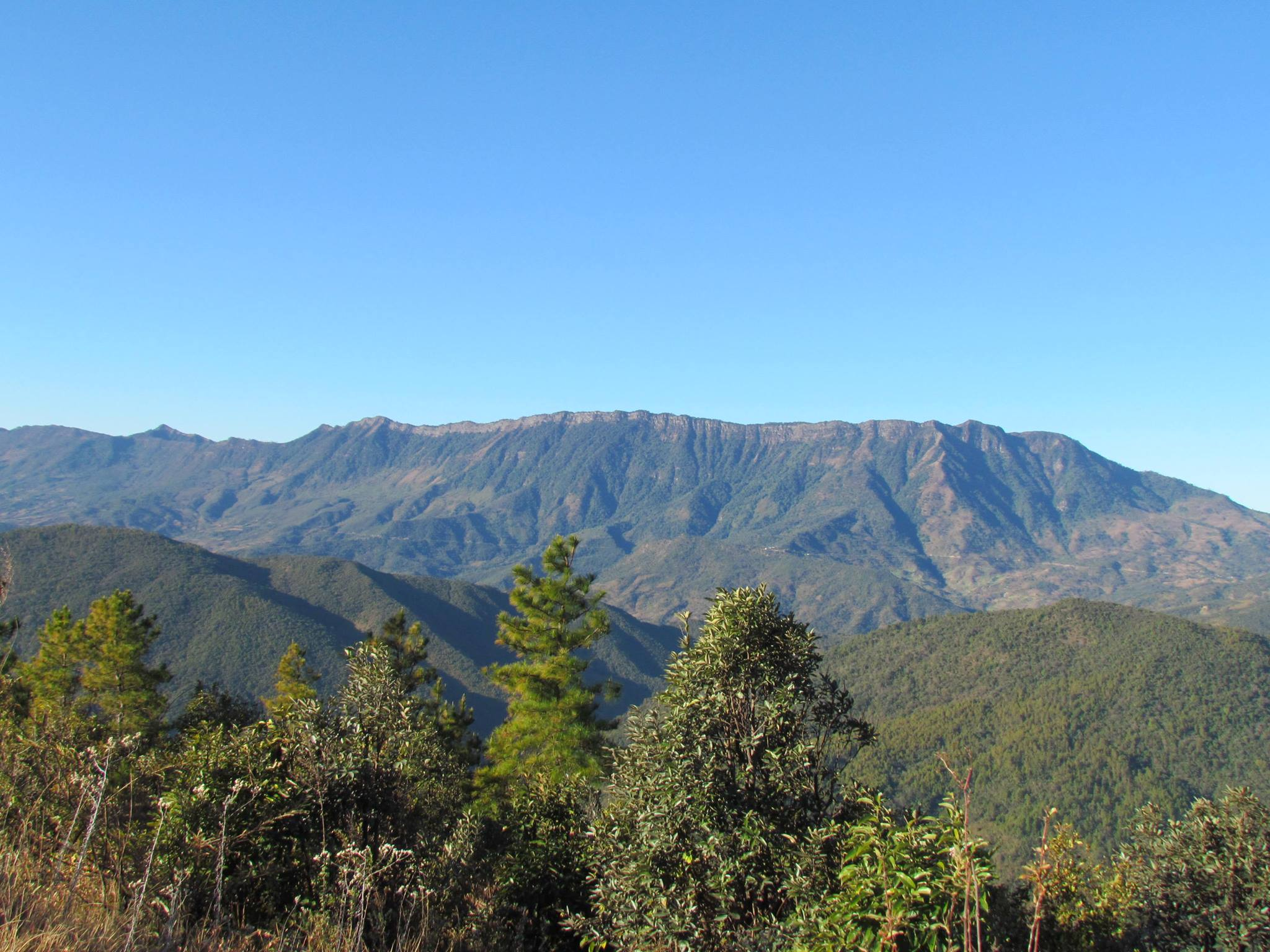

== Sanctuary plan ==
The plan for sanctuary on Zinghmuh mountain areas is yet to be implemented by the Myanmar central government. Proposal had been made, however, the plan was objected by nearby villages. As it stands, the plan for sanctuary is yet to be resolved.

== See also ==
- List of mountains in Burma
