= Ngawn people =

Ethnic group in Myanmar

Ngawn
Total population
- c. 19,000

Regions with significant populations
- Falam Township; Sagaing Region

Languages
- Ngawn, Burmese

Religion
- Christianity; animism (minority)

Related ethnic groups
- Lai people, other Chin peoples

The Ngawn people (also known as the Ngawn Chin, Ngorn or Ngon) are a Chin ethnic group primarily inhabiting 16 villages in Falam Township, Chin State. The Ngawn are also found in the Kale and Tamu Districts of Sagaing Region. They speak the Ngawn language and are one of the 135 officially recognised ethnic groups of Myanmar.

== History ==
In the 1931 Burma census, 5,119 people were cited as "Ngorn".

== Sources ==
- Seekins, Donald M. (2025). The Army-State and Spatial Politics in Burma. Bristol University Press. ISBN 9781529240467.
