= Ngawn language =

Sino-Tibetan language spoken in Myanmar

Ngawn Chin
- Region: Myanmar
- Ethnicity: Ngawn, Chin
- Native speakers: 18,600 (2017)
- Language family: Sino-Tibetan: (Tibeto-Burman); Kuki-Chin; Northern Chin languages; Ngawn Chin

Language codes
- ISO 639-3: cnw
- Glottolog: ngaw1239

Ngawn or Ngawn Chin (natively called ŋɔ̂n) is a Chin language spoken in Falam District, Chin State, and Kale District, Sagaing Region, Myanmar. There are 27 Ngawn-speaking villages in Falam township, Chin State.

Some Ngawn people also live in Tonzang Township, Chin State and Kalay, Kabaw, Sagaing Region.

== Examples ==
Ngawn Chin	English	Myanmar
Dam a cim?	How are you?	နေကောင်းလား
Tui	Water	ရေ
Pa (Pa aw)	Father (Dad)	အဖေ
Nu (Nu aw)	Mother (Mom)	အမေ
Hade	Moon	လ
Ni	Sun	နေ
Pathian	God	ဘုရား
Mei	Fire	မီး
Inn	Home	အိမ်
Lai Buu	Book	စာအုပ်

Saimun	Khawdar	Khawpual	Zawngkong	Vazang
Sihtui	Kelkong	Zawlnu	Sialsih	N.Munpi
Duhmang	Ngamual	Thutmual	Bualkhaw	Phaizawl
Farkhawm	Tuisan	New Suangpi	Valung	Khuangmual
Zawnglei	Suangdo			

Those villages are located in (Hualngo area and Zanniat area), Falam Township, Chin State. And those villages are founded by Ngawn people. Zawlpi village is a new one they founded in 2016 officially.

Lianhna	Ṭiau	
Kawlfang	Niimzawl	Zawlpi

Tuikhing	Sialthawzang	Kiimlai	Mainuai	Aungzua
Smikekwin	Thayakone (W)	Nanchaung	Pyinkhonegyi	Myaungsone
Sentaw	Santa (W)	Kalay		
