= Laiva Dam =

Dam in Chin State, Myanmar

Coordinates: 22°51′11.2″N 93°32′01.1″E

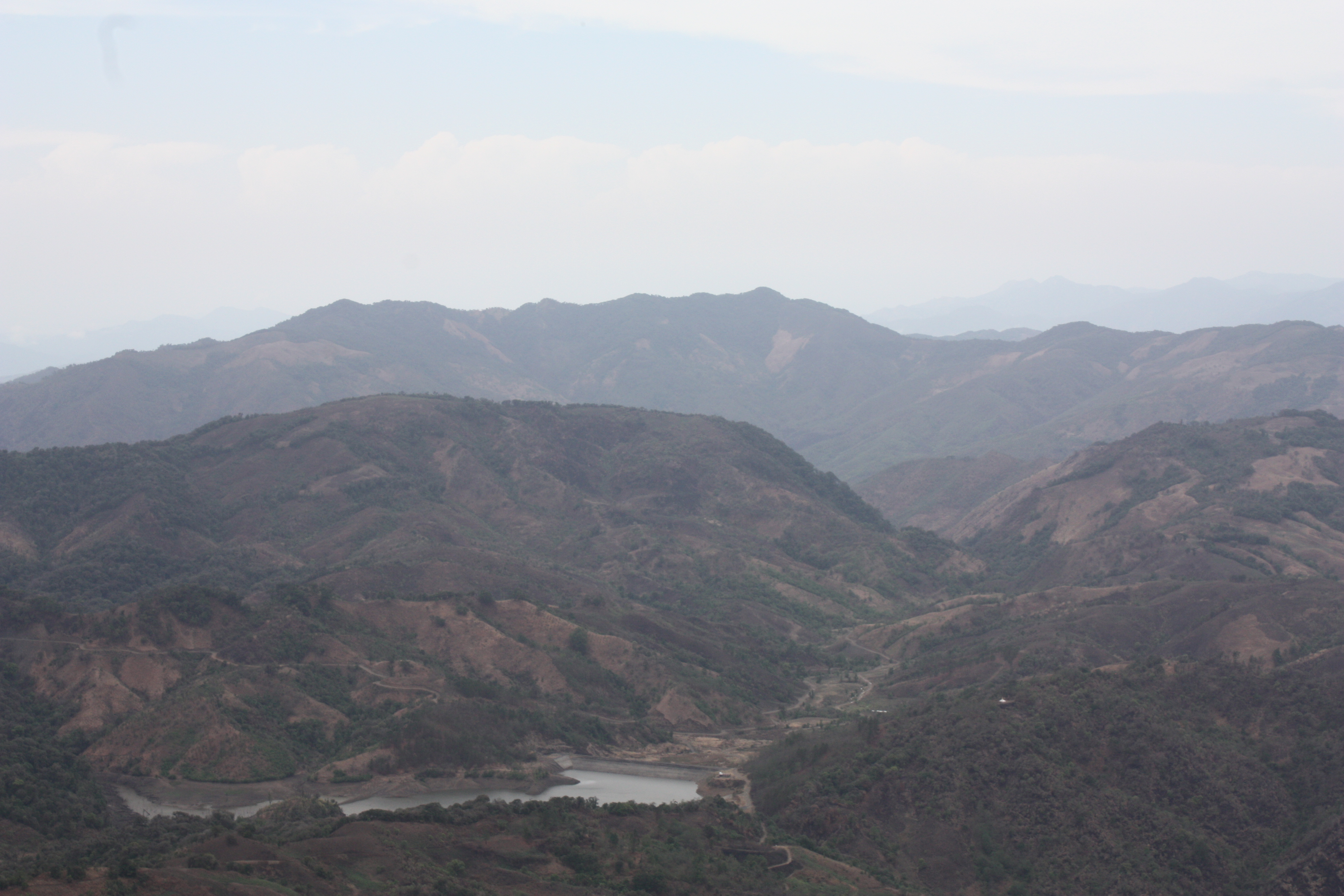
Laiva Dam and its reservoir seen from the South (2013)

Laiva Dam is a dam in Falam Township, Falam District, Chin State in Burma (Myanmar), on the Lai Va River, a west flowing tributary of the Ṭio River. The 600-kilowatt facility was built by the Chinese firm Yunnan Machinery & Equipment Import & Export Co. (YMEC). It was completed in April 1994. The dam produces hydroelectric power for Falam and neighboring towns such as Hakha and Thantlang (Thlangtlang).
