= Rinpi =

Village in Myanmar

Coordinates: 22°46′16″N 93°44′55″E

Rinpi, previously Rimpi, is a village in Hakha township, Chin State, Myanmar.

== History ==
Rinpi village is said to have been established by the five sons of Pu Ral Thang, of the Khualsim tribe. This tribe came into Simpi around 1570-1580 AD and settled at Simpi Village. The tribal chief, Pu Ral Thang, had five sons with his first wife; the eldest was Pu Hriam Ee and the youngest was Mi Ee. After his first wife's death Pu Ral Thang married a second wife, who disliked his sons. She requested that her husband either send them away or kill them, otherwise she would divorce him.

Pu Ral Thang was reluctant to harm his sons and did not know how to send them away. After two attempts to abandon his sons in the forest, from which they returned, Pu Ral Thang sadly took his five sons to the river Phauva, which, in the rainy season, is narrow and deep. It forms the boundary between Falam and the Hakha township area. At noon that day, Pu Ral Thang threw his sons into the river, but the current took them to the other side. Even though they wanted to go back home, they couldn't get back across the river and were forced to settle on the other side. A few months later, in spring, his sons still not having come back, Pu Ral Thang went to observe the area. He went to the other side of the Phauva River and met them there. They named that place Hmunhlipi. "Hmum" stands for "the place where father and sons met". "Hli" stands for "they were the sons of the first wife", and Pi means "the place they came from was Simpi".

There is a story behind the Rinpi song "Hai par thing sang cung in, hrin hniang man thlau ai u, khua hlan nu ei huat cu kan rak tuar hringhran ee". This song refers to the hardships of being abandoned. Hmunhlipi became prosperous year after year until it contained over 50 households. During this time Pu Ral Thang's eldest son Pu Hriam Ee had two sons of his own, who were named Pu Cio Kip and Pu Bawi Tiam.

== Hmunhlipi to Rimpi ==
Due to a tribal war in Chinland territory, Hmunhlipi village was also forsaken and the Hmunhlipi people had to run for their lives. Some went to the Plain area around the Kalay valley. When the situation had become more stable, Pu Cio Kip's generation returned to find their old place again. In this year he had a son which they named "Zo Kaar", which means "after passing through the deep forest and through hardships from the plain, they managed to come to their home in a cold mountainous place". They named their new settlement as "Rimpi".

The Chinland people had no literature before the British occupied the territory, so the name of the village was not written down throughout its history. In 1894, Major Newland invented "Lai literature based on the English alphabet", printed in 1897, and having over 600 pages. Subsequently, the American Baptist Missionary Authur E. Carson & Laura came to Chinland in 1899 and Chin literature was further developed. The village name was first written down by Tuck & Carey, in "The Chin Hill", Vols.1 and 2 as "Rimpi". This was the name also used by the British government.

== Rimpi to Rinpi ==
Since the Union of Myanmar, established on February 12, 1947, the village name has been written as "Rinpi", which is the closest approximation to its Burmese pronunciation. This has now become its official name.
