= Rimpi =

Rimpi may refer to:

== People ==
- Rimpi Das, Indian actress and model

== Places ==
- Rimpi, Kuhmo, village in Kuhmo, Finland
- Rinpi (formerly Rimpi), village in Chin State, Myanmar
