= National Liberation Army (Myanmar) =

Armed resistance organization in Myanmar

- အမျိုးသား လွတ်မြောက်ရေးတပ်မတော်
- Flag of National Liberation Army (Myanmar)
- Founded: 5 March 2023

The National Liberation Army (Burmese: အမျိုးသား လွတ်မြောက်ရေးတပ်မတော်; abbreviated NLA) is an armed resistance organization active in the Tamu District of Myanmar.

== History ==
Formerly part of the PDF as Tamu Battalion 3, the NLA split off on March 5, 2023 to form their own resistance organization. On March 24th, the NLA launched Operation Coucal where they performed an early morning raid on a Myanmar Police Force station in Bokkan village. Shotguns, BA-94 Uzis, BA-63 battle rifles, AK-47 assault rifles, ammunition, knives, bayonets, explosives, and police equipment were seized.

The NLA took part in the Battle of Falam.

The NLA collaborated with the Chin National Army, Kuki National Army-Burma, and the PDF to repel a Tatmadaw attack Tamu Township, Sagaing Region from 5 August 2025 to 8 August 2025.

On 20 March 2026, the NLA integrated into the People's Defence Force under the 1st Military Region.
