= Falam District =

District of Myanmar

Falam District (Red) location in Chin state

Falam District (Burmese: ဖလမ်းခရိုင်) is a district of the Chin State in Myanmar (Burma). As of 2022, it consists of one township and 445 villages. The major towns include: Fort White, and Falam.

== Borders ==
Falam District borders:

- Tedim District to the north;
- Mizoram State of India to the west;
- Hakha District to the south;
- Kale District (Kalemyo District) of Sagaing Division to the east.

== Townships ==
The district contained the following townships in the past:

- Falam Township
  - Rikhawdar Sub-township
- Tedim Township
- Tonzang Township

After the formation of Hakha District by the first Chin State Hluttaw emergency meeting No. 2/2012 on 1 June, only Falam, Tedim and Tonzang townships remain in Falam District. On May 1, 2022, Tedim District was formed with Tedim and Tonzang townships. Now only Falam Township remain in Falam District.
