= Falam Township =

Township in Chin State, Myanmar

Falam Township ဖလမ်းမြို့နယ်
- Township
- location in Falam district
- Coordinates: 22°59′N 93°42′E
- Country: Burma
- State: Chin State
- District: Falam District
- Capital: Falam

Population (2008)
  - Total: 46,883
- Time zone: UTC+6:30 (MMT)

Falam Township (Burmese: ဖလမ်းမြို့နယ်) is the only township of Falam District in the Chin State of Myanmar. Its administrative seat is the town of Falam. The population, as of 2014, is 41,457 (male: 20,350; female: 21,107). Out of this population, 9,092 live in Falam town (urban population) and 32,365 in rural areas.

Falam Township is mountainous, running east–west from the foothills above the Neyinzaya and Myittha rivers to the high peaks of the Chin Hills in the Arakan Mountain Range and down to the border with Mizoram State, India. The highest peak in the township, Mount Zinghmuh, is also the second highest mountain peak in Chin State. The Manipur (Manipuya) River runs south through the center of the township. People who travel to the city take the Kalay-Falam-Hakha Road. The township is famous for its heart-shaped lake called Hri (Rih or Yi). The township is also the location of Laiva Dam, the largest dam in Chin State. The dam produces hydroelectric power for Falam and neighboring cities such as Hakha and Thantlang (Thlangtlang).

Bridges include the Manipura river-crossing suspension bridge, 320 feet long by 5 feet wide, linking Bazan Village and Kawdah Village, and the Lonnlwe creek-crossing suspension bridge, 130 feet long by four feet wide, linking Kawdah Village and Kwabwe Village in the township.

== History ==
In the reorganization of Chin State townships in 2008, Falam Township lost its northernmost village tracts in the east to Tiddim Township, and a few of its recently gained southwestern-most village tracts were returned to Thantlang Township, but it gained a much longer border with India by the transfer of Tiddim Township's southwestern village tracts to Fallam Township.

In 2022, it became the only township left in Falam District after the formation of the Tedim District.

== Communities ==
The town of Rihkhawdar (Reehkawdar) is the northernmost town in the township. The township has 87 village tracts and 178 villages.
