= Falam, Myanmar =

Falam ဖလမ်းမြို့ Palan
- Town
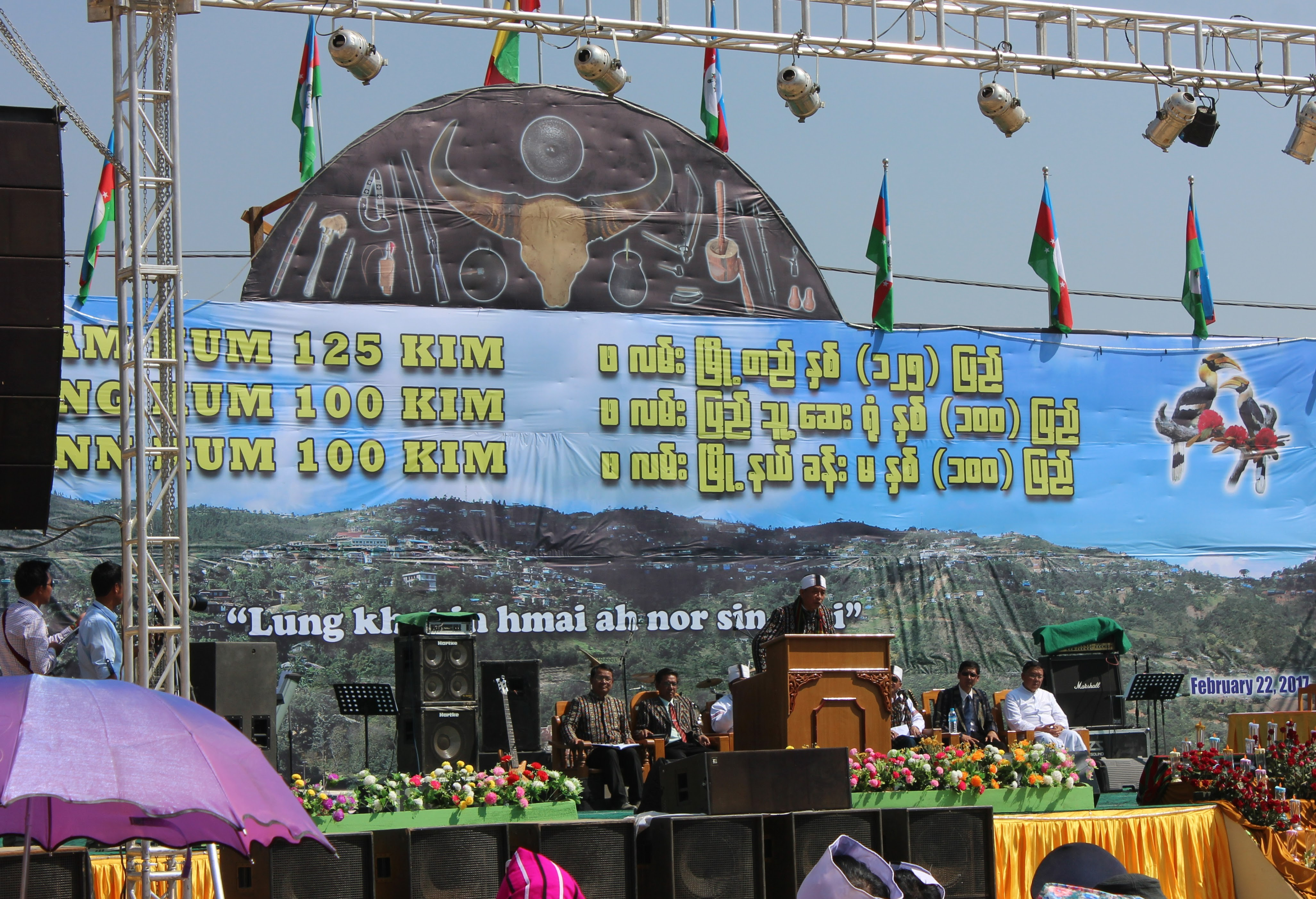
- Quasquicentennial (125th anniversary) celebration of the founding of Falam, Feb 22, 2017

- Location in Burma
- Coordinates: 22°54′49″N 93°40′40″E
- Country: Myanmar
- Division: Chin State
- District: Falam District
- Township: Falam Township
- Elevation: 5,500 ft (1,700 m)

Population (2010)
  - Total: 9,529
  - Religions: Christian 97% Buddhist 2% Others 1%
- Time zone: UTC+6.30 (MST)
- Climate: Cwb

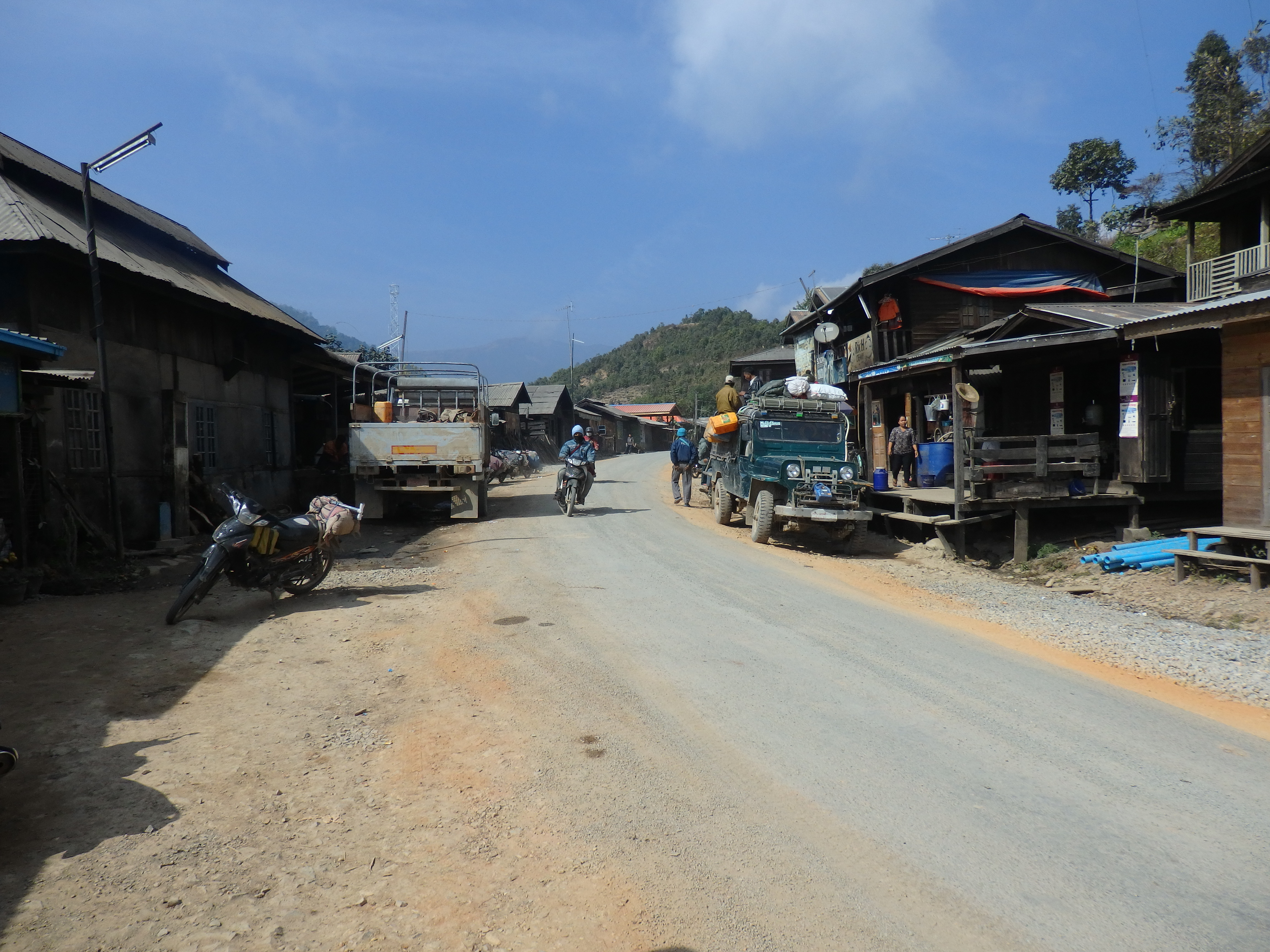
Street in Falam

Falam (Burmese: ဖလမ်းမြို့, MLCTS: pha. lam: mrui., pronounced [pʰəláɰ̃ mjo̰]) is a town in northwestern Burma (Myanmar) near Burma's western border with the Indian state of Mizoram. The town was founded by the Taisun tribe. The British arrived in Falam in 1892, and it became an important base for British rule of the Chin Hills. After the formation of Chin State, it was the capital city until the administrative offices were moved to Hakha in 1974. It is still the administrative centre of Falam District and of Falam Township. Falam is the headquarters of several important organizations, such as the Chin Baptist Convention (CBC).

The first school (National School of Ek Tu) established in Chin State is the No.1 Basic Education High School in Falam. Many of the buildings in Falam reflect the British occupation and its former status as the state capital. The main road (Kalay-Falam-Hakha) in the Chin mountains travels through Falam.

== Demographics ==
The population, as of 2014, was listed at 9,092 with 4266 male and 4826 female residents.

== Historical perspective ==
The term “Falam” is the English pronunciation of the Ṭaisun word “Fahlam,” the combination of “Fa” (children) and “Hlam” (shelter or hut). The word Fahlam refers to a safe location where the children of the Ṭaisun clan were sheltered during wars and other dangers. Ṭaisun was one of the strongest clans in the Chin Hills under the leadership of democratically elected Chief Pu Con Bik, who was wise and brave enough to collaborate with other clans against the British rule in Chin history. When the British colonisers arrived in the land of Ṭaisun in 1892, they established an administrative capital in Fahlam to govern the Chin Hills due to its strategic location.

The British soon recognised the influence of the tribal chieftain system among Indigenous clans and tribes, and introduced “The Chin Hills Regulation 1896,” which maintained the status quo of the chiefs and their clans but under their supervision. The chiefs of Laizo, Sim, Ṭaisun, Zahua, and Zanniat were known for their influence over their people and were thus incorporated into the British administration. The term “Fahlam” (also spelled “Falam”) has now become a collective name for the people inhabiting the Fahlam region. The leading clans in this region are (in alphabetical order): Hlawnceu, Hualngo, Khualsim, Laizo, Lente, Ngawn, Sim, Tapong, Ṭaisun, Zahau, and Zanniat. These clans are known as “hrinhnam,” which translates to “clan,” but they are loosely referred to as “miphun,” meaning “tribe.” Thus, the terms "clan" and "tribe" are used interchangeably in the community. Similarly, while some clans use “lal” interchangeably to refer to “tribal chief” and “village head,” some clans use “lal’ for “village head” and “Mi-uk” for “tribal chief.”

Not all the clans mentioned above had their own chiefs; instead, they lived autonomously in villages, each ruled by its respective village head. At the same time, a significant number of clans without a chieftain system lived among other clans under the jurisdiction of their respective tribal chiefs. According to Henry Stevenson, “The Hualngo and Ngawn, both fairly numerous tribes, have no chief of their own. The Lumbang (Zanniat) and Khuangli (Sim) Chiefs share most of the Ngawn, while the Zahau Chief rules the Hualngo.”

=== The Falam people (Falammi) ===
The Falam people (Falammi) primarily refer to the indigenous clans or tribes of Falamram, as previously stated, and the residents of Falam town and various places within its region, regardless of their clan or ethnic background. Even after they migrated to other areas or parts of the world, the Indigenous people of Falamram are always considered Falammi. When the British left, they left behind the servicemen and women of Chinese and Nepalis-Indian ethnicity, many of whom continued to call Falam their home for the rest of their lives. These servicemen and women, and their descendants, are, by all means, embraced by all the Falammi as their fellow Falammi. Some of them became prominent public figures of Falamram.

=== Spoken Language in Falam (Falam ṭong) ===
The “Falam ṭong” primarily refers to the language traditionally spoken in Falam town. It is not a dialect of any particular tribe, but rather a combination of the local Ṭaisun and Laizo dialects, and neighboring Sim, Zahau, Laizo, Hakha, and Hlawnceu dialects. This language is recognised as the official language of the Chin by successive Union Governments and, as such, a broadcast language for the Chins on the official Myanmar Radio and Television (MRTV). Moreover, it is very similar to the Mizo language spoken in Mizoram, India, and is easily understood by other tribes. Any Chin tribe may try to converse in a combination of two or more dialects in Falam town, and it will be considered Falam ṭong by the locals. It is a language spoken for one’s convenience. Until the late 1970s, Punjabis residing in Falam often spoke an Indianized version of the Falam ṭong. Instead of saying “In tlun lo ding maw?” (which means, “Are you not coming with me?”) in the standard language spoken in Falam town, the Punjabis would say, “Keimah rangah nangmah kha ra lo peimaw?” yet no one ridiculed or complained about it.

=== Climate ===
Climate data for Falam, elevation 1,372 m (4,501 ft), (1991–2020)
| Month | Jan | Feb | Mar | Apr | May | Jun | Jul | Aug | Sep | Oct | Nov | Dec | Year |
|---|---|---|---|---|---|---|---|---|---|---|---|---|---|
| Record high °C (°F) | 28.6 (83.5) | 30.5 (86.9) | 30.7 (87.3) | 34.0 (93.2) | 34.0 (93.2) | 32.2 (90.0) | 29.0 (84.2) | 29.0 (84.2) | 29.5 (85.1) | 30.8 (87.4) | 29.5 (85.1) | 27.0 (80.6) | 34.0 (93.2) |
| Mean daily maximum °C (°F) | 20.4 (68.7) | 22.4 (72.3) | 25.3 (77.5) | 27.1 (80.8) | 26.0 (78.8) | 24.5 (76.1) | 23.7 (74.7) | 23.6 (74.5) | 24.0 (75.2) | 23.9 (75.0) | 22.2 (72.0) | 20.6 (69.1) | 23.6 (74.5) |
| Daily mean °C (°F) | 14.3 (57.7) | 16.3 (61.3) | 19.2 (66.6) | 21.4 (70.5) | 21.4 (70.5) | 21.1 (70.0) | 20.7 (69.3) | 20.7 (69.3) | 20.6 (69.1) | 19.8 (67.6) | 17.2 (63.0) | 14.7 (58.5) | 19.0 (66.2) |
| Mean daily minimum °C (°F) | 8.3 (46.9) | 10.2 (50.4) | 13.2 (55.8) | 15.6 (60.1) | 16.7 (62.1) | 17.7 (63.9) | 17.8 (64.0) | 17.7 (63.9) | 17.3 (63.1) | 15.8 (60.4) | 12.2 (54.0) | 8.9 (48.0) | 14.3 (57.7) |
| Record low °C (°F) | 4.0 (39.2) | 4.0 (39.2) | 7.0 (44.6) | 9.8 (49.6) | 11.5 (52.7) | 12.3 (54.1) | 15.0 (59.0) | 15.0 (59.0) | 13.5 (56.3) | 11.6 (52.9) | 7.6 (45.7) | 5.0 (41.0) | 4.0 (39.2) |
| Average precipitation mm (inches) | 11.3 (0.44) | 9.7 (0.38) | 26.9 (1.06) | 68.2 (2.69) | 179.5 (7.07) | 241.3 (9.50) | 286.9 (11.30) | 272.6 (10.73) | 226.8 (8.93) | 160.7 (6.33) | 38.8 (1.53) | 12.3 (0.48) | 1,535.2 (60.44) |
| Average precipitation days (≥ 1.0 mm) | 1.1 | 1.6 | 2.9 | 6.6 | 13.3 | 19.0 | 23.1 | 21.6 | 16.8 | 12.7 | 4.2 | 1.3 | 124.3 |
Source 1: World Meteorological Organization
Source 2: Norwegian Meteorological Institute

== Ministries and government organizations ==
Many federal agencies maintain offices in Falam, such as Forestry, Health, Agriculture, Customs and Education.

== Television ==
- MRTV
- Myawaddy TV
- Myanmar International television formerly MRTV-3
- MRTV-4

== Radio ==
- Myanmar Radio National Service
