= Lushai Rising =

Anti-British revolt by Lushai chiefs (1890-1896)

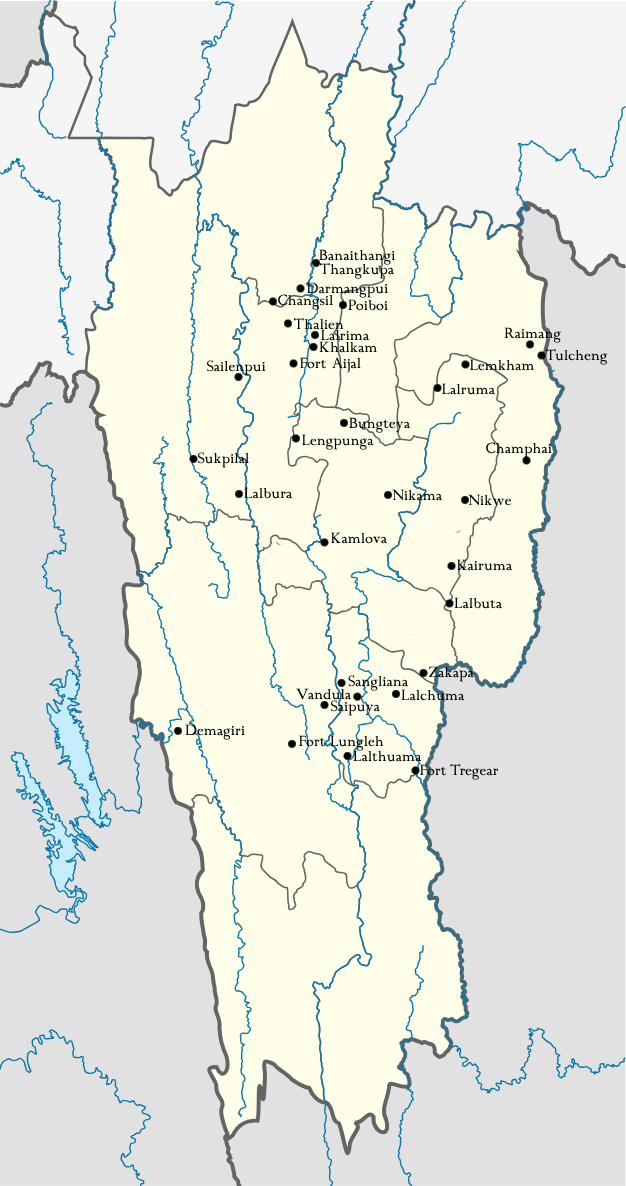
- Map of Lushai chiefs and prominent settlements 1890
Date	April 30, 1890 – 1895
Location	Lushai Hills
Result	British victory Pacification of Lushai Hills

Belligerents
British Raj	Mizo chiefs

Commanders and leaders
C.S. Murray; John Shakespear; H.R Browne †	Khalkam; Khuangchera; Lalbura; Ropuiliani; Zakapa

The Lushai Rising was the conflict between the British and the Lushai chiefs in 1890-1895, which began following the annexation of the Lushai Hills after the Chin-Lushai Expedition. It concerned the Western chiefs, the Eastern chief and Southern chiefs separately at different intervals. By 1895, the Lushai resistance and rising was considered over.

== Background ==
The annexation of the Lushai Hills saw punitive expeditions with a new goal to annex the Lushai Hills and establish a garrison to control the raiding of the Lushai tribes. However, after the expedition ended in April 1890, not all Lushai chiefs supported the annexation and influential chiefs formed organized resistances as a result. Two offices of political officers were created in the North and South Lushai Hills. The tasks were to pacify the tribes and establish outposts.

== Western Lushai Rising ==
=== Murder of H.R Browne ===
Captain H.R Browne was appointed as political officer of the North Lushai Hills on 1 April 1890. On 13 June 1890, Browne held a durbar of chiefs and announced that Lianphunga and Zahrâwka would be deposed from chieftainship for a term of four years for their raid on Chengri Valley and fined 15 guns. Lengpunga had escaped the British during the Chin-Lushai Expedition and built up new settlements instead. Browne had to choose the punishment carefully to balance the interests of not antagonising the chiefs and not showing weakness in the British occupation of the Lushai Hills.

Browne, as a political officer of the North Lushai Hills, focussed on bringing stability with the development of roads. With the inability and insecurity to import coolies to construct the road, Browne opted to request quotas of Lushai men under the chiefs to work as coolies in forced labour. Kalkhama who realized that revenue would be taken from the chiefs and their freedom to hunt their own jungles led him to cast aside his oath of fealty with Browne. Khalkam held a meeting in his zawlbuk with other chiefs. The chiefs, Thangula, Thanruma, Lenkhunga, Lalrima, Minthang and Rankupa. Khalkam who was considered the head of the Western Lushai chiefs after his father, Suakpuilala plotted to revolt against the British.

Kalkhama became antagonistic to the British as the older brother of Lianphunga. The burning of Liangphunga's villages and the establishments of outposts in the Lushai Hills made him resist British annexation. Kalkhama using his influence got another chief, Thansuma, with a war party to ambush Browne during his travels between Fort Aijal and Changsil. On 9 September 1890, Browne was accompanied by a small party of four police sepoys from Fort Aijal to his post in Changsil. In the ambush, three of his men were killed, and Browne was stabbed in the arm with 3 severe wounds and excessive bleeding. Browne was mortally wounded and died 15 minutes later after being brought to the post. Thanruma had, under a friendly pretence met with Browne and informed his accomplices of his whereabouts. Thansuma, a subordinate chief to Kalkhama, (not Thanruma, his brother) was chiefly responsible in the ambush and murder of Captain Browne. Thansuma had arranged for 300 Lushai warriors to surround Browne's small party. Only one man was able to escape the ambush and to Silchar and inform of the events concerning Captain Browne.

=== Attack on Fort Aijal and Changsil Post ===
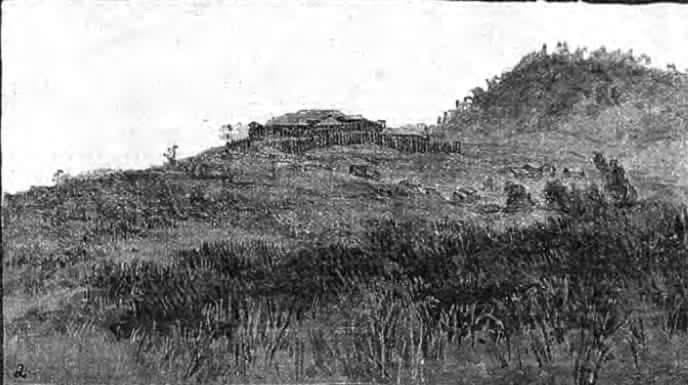
Fort Aijal, present-day Aizawl, in 1889.

Kalkhama subsequently attacked Fort Aijal and overran the British stronghold. Changsil was also besieged by the Lushais. Surgeon H.B. Melville commanded Aijal Fort, while Lieutenant Harry W.G Cole commanded Changsil Post. Melville recorded at 9am a sepoy and four coolies arriving at the fort and informing of shots being fired at their party from Thanruma's village. The survivors reported the deaths of many sepoys and coolies. The coolies had lost all these blanets and clothing. Melville made a rapid heliograph of the news to Lieutenant Cole at Changsil. Cole replied of an attack on the outpost and questioning Browne's status. Melville would repeat his lack of knowledge on Browne before Lieutenant Cole would report Browne brought to Changsil heavily wounded. Browne had been escorted and died ten minutes later. Melville immediately ordered Browne's bungalow to be evacuated with the coolies moving all of his belongings and furniture into Fort Aijal apart from heavy furniture. The Lushais would fire upon the Fort for a few hours before the coolies could properly move the heavy furniture into Fort Aijal as well with the guards withdrawn from the bungalow. Harry Cole was the commandant of the Surma Valley Military Police Battalion, which had 170 military police personnel with him. At Fort Aijal, the British were in the process of building a second stockade before being ambushed without prior warning. The party was driven out into the main stockade, which was surrounded by the Lushais, who attacked for several hours. The bodies of the Lushais revealed that the whole countryside was in revolt. The first night of the rising saw firing of volleys at the fort all night long which Melville estimated at most 200-300 Lushais. The bungalow was fired the night and completely burned down with ambiguous causaltis of the Lushai. British reports commented that it was not only Khalkam and Thanruma opposing violently but the whole of the Western Lushai Hills. Heavy downpour had stifled communication between the British and made the terrain difficult to navigate.

The Changsil Outpost was besieged on 10 September 1890. This battle involved the famous Pasalṭha, Khuangchera and his friend. During the siege, the soldiers shot and killed Khuangchera's companion. According to Mizo custom, the dead body of a friend isn't left behind or forsaken on the battlefield, and according to the Pasalṭha code, Khuangchera attempted to carry his friend's body. However, the soldiers at Changsil Fort fired at Khuangchera, leading to his death.

The following day, on 10 September, Fort Aijal's smaller fort was further fortified. Additional ammunition was brought to the fort, with men digging, firing pits, and patrolling their posts. Reports made by the senior jemadar reported the firing throughout the night expended 1500 rounds of ammunition with 30000 remaining. The same day, a missing sepoy arrived at the small fort without weapons or ammunition, which he had hidden in the jungle and escaped from the Lushais along with two coolies. The coolies in Fort Aijal were assigned to cut down the jungle around the fort. Melville records the small fort as only maintaining 34 sepoys, one havildar and one jemadar. The larger fort maintained 108 sepoys, including non-commissioned officers and three native offices. Along with 25 total coolies across both, a total of 151 people were locked down. Based on the warehouse reports, rations within Fort Aijal were specified to last for at least two months. Medical supplies also became scarce as quinine became reserved for the sepoys, with all other cases of fever to be treated with arsenic. Most men, including those within the fort hospital, were willing to fight throughout the night, while the sickest of the sepoys were made to remain within. Melville further ordered lenient rations of wine, tinned milk, and meat extract for the sick sepoys. The following morning the coolies cut more jungle and assembled logs lying outside to strengthen the structure of the stockades and make the fortifications bulletproof.

Melville continued to water the fort and maintain the defence responsibilities. Communications with Lieutenant Cole defending Changsil became obscured via heliograph after bad weather blocked the sun. Afterwards Cole heliographed that there was no response from the Sairang guards being requested for backup, and it was assumed they had been killed or overran. Melville subsequently placed the coolies into the fort hospital and moved the sick into the dispensary for better recovery. Concerns were raised over the supply of lime juice, vegetables, and fresh meat and whether the government would supply them. The threat of dysentery and scurvy was a concern. Melville utilised Brown's tins of cocoa and milk after wet and cold nights in the stockades to maintain morale among the sepoys and officers.

On 13 September, Melville reported heavy assaults by Lushai warriors in two waves. The first wave occurred from 9-11 am, with the second from 2- 3:30 am. No casualties were reported as the bullets were fired higher than the posts on the fort. Signal fires were burned in the surrounding villages which threatened a fire emergency at the fort. Melville remarked on the luck of the wind direction and ordered the fort to be unroofed and all straw mat walls to be taken down. The same order was carried out for the cook houses and the hen houses, which were dismantled. The following day, communications with Cole revealed the Sairang guard and Browne's party of sepoys to be safe.

On 16 September, firing was heard at 9:30 am. Ten sepoys were assigned to fight back, and after two volleys, the Lushais scattered once more. Lieutenant Cole, via heliograph, assured that a party of 200 sepoys would arrive to relieve Fort Aijal and questioned how much ammunition was remaining. The subedar reported that 6000 cartridges had been expended, which was used as a reply. Sailenpui's village would be deserted via an observation made by Melville on 17 September, prompting the British to assume whether he had joined Khalkam and the rising or mainly just travelled to harvest their jhums.

On 21 September, Lieutenant Cole heliographed their travel to be only a few days away. Melville would relay the state of the fort and the remaining amount of rations fit for only a week and only consisting of lentil and ghee. Singal fires observed in Thanruma, Sailenpui, Lalluia, Lalrima and Lalbura's villages were also relayed after observation. However revelations by the warehouse manager revealed the remaining lentils were defective and caused dysentery. This prompted Melville to inspect the food stock himself to properly inform Cole of the issue of rations.

The officials in Cachar sent two despatchments to relieve Fort Aijal and Changsil. The relief force sonsited of 200 men from the Surma Valley Military Police from Silchar led by A.C Tytler and Lieutenant R.R Swinton of the 44th Bengal Infantry. Mr A.W. Shuttleworth, the assistant superintendent of Police also accompanied the force. One of the detachments was attacked en-route while navigating the river to Fort Aijal. Lieutenant Swinton was killed on 26 September while navigating the force up the river to Changsil, with many men wounded. After the relief of Changsil post, H.W.G Cole and A.C Tytler marched towards Fort Aijal with Lieutenant Watson of the 40th Bengal Infantry. They reached Fort Aijal on 4 October and relieved Dr Melville's defense. Surgeon Captain Melville and Lieutenant H.W.G Cole were credited for defending Aijal and Changsil by holding out for reinforcements via the Dhaleswari river. Chief Commissioner of Assam, Quinton, commented on Melville's leadership and novelty in military affairs and handling the siege with 110 native officers and 43 individuals who suffered from the weather, food shortages and lack of warm clothing. Melville's diary stated that 5 out of 6 men had no warm clothing at all during the month long siege.

=== R.B. McCabe ===
The death of H.R Browne had led to R.B McCabe being assigned as the new political officer of the North Lushai Hills. He had been transferred from the post of Deputy Commissioner of Lakhimpur. He set out with Captain Williamson of the Commissariat and arrived in Changsil on 5 October 1890. He relieved A.W Shuttleworth, who was in command of pacification between Browne's death and McCabe's appointment. McCabe was nominated based on his past achievements in dealing with the Naga tribes. McCabe was responsible for capturing Lengpunga. McCabe accompanied the Surma Valley Police Battalion to bring about the surrender and submission of the Western Lushai chiefs. The operation occurred between 16 November to 28 November 1890. A combined movement of forces from Aijal and Changsil descended on Khalkam's capital settlement. Khalkam fled his village before the fighting began. Khalkam's settlement was overpowered, and on 23 November, he surrendered unconditionally to McCabe. McCabe would later write that pacification of the hills required the removal of influential chiefs. For the Western Lushai Chiefs, McCabe classified Khalkam as the most influential. His eldest brothers, Lengpunga, Sailenpui, Thanruma and Thangula, were classified as responsible agents. The brothers of Khalkam, such as Lengkhunga, Rankupa, Lalhrima, Lalsavuta and Lalluia, were classified as mere boys. The younger brothers, such as Tolera, Hminghthanga, Thawmpawnga, Thalien and Lenkhai, were called dependants of Suakpuilala. Sailianpuia was not punished due to his good disposition to the British. Kalkhama, Lianphunga and Thaghulha were chosen to be deported as a decapitation operation. During the pacification campaign R.B. McCabe oversaw the villages of Tanhril, Sentlang and Muthi burned.

Khalkam was sent along with his brothers Lengpunga and Thangula to Hazaribagh Jail, where he and Lengpunga committed suicide. After Khalkam's arrest, fifteen more western chiefs were captured, while some surrendered, like Khama, Tolera, and Liannkhunga. The rest of the Western Lushai chiefs(namely Suakpuilala's sons), such as Lalhrima, Sailianpuia, and Thanghulha, surrendered as well. By the end of the year all offending villages had been destroyed by McCabe. An estimated 50 Lushais were killed through the operations of McCabe's pacification campaign. Fines were implemented on offending settlements and guns were confiscated from chiefs to disarm the Lushai tribes.

Investigations after the surrender of the Western Lushais implicated Liankhunga as the conspirator who led to Captain Browne's murder and Lieutenant Swinton's death. Lalhrima was implicated on account of surrendering Captain Browne's possessions and personal property.

Western Lushai-Palian Chiefs Family Tree

Purburha
Sibuta
Chhungpaliana
Lalkhamliana
Kohzasira	Lalpuiliana
Lallula	Bantawia	Lalrihua	Bontai	Liandova
Vûta	Lallianvunga	Lalpuiliana	Mângpawrha	Pi Buki	Lalsuthlaha	Lalhmingsanga	Lal Hlun
Ruthangpi	Rûnphunga	Thâwmpâwnga	Suakpuilala	Banaitangi	Ngursailova	Dorikhuma
Thanghulha	Vanrûma	Laljachera	Bankhampui
Lalchhûnga (d.) (Note: Lalchunga died early making Khalkam the oldest. His sons were raised by Sukpilal.)	Khalkama	Lianphunga	Sailianpui	Thanrûma	Lalhrima	Lalsavunga	Hrangkhupa	Zahrâwka	Dokhûma	Tulêra	Lalsavûta	Thangvûta
Liankunga

== Eastern Lushai Rising ==
The Eastern Lushai Chiefs did not aid the Western Lushai Chiefs in their 1890 rising. It was in their interest to see the western chiefs defeated and weakened instead. During the rainy season, the British didn't make a lot of contact with eastern chiefs enabling them not to be taxed or levied for coolie quotas. In 1891, McCabe announced a house tax of one rupee per house. In response the Eastern Lushai chiefs made a bid for independence. The Eastern Lushais raided Barunicherra Tea estate with 42 people being killed with 13 captives. A follow up raid at Monierkhal was also made. The political officer of the North Lushai Hills succeeded in preventing the western chiefs from joining the rising.

McCabe recorded that two factions of the Eastern Lushai chiefs would have to be dealt with. The first faction consisted of Vanhnuailiana's family of Lalburha, Pâwibâwia, Buangtheuva and Liankhama. The only powerful chief in Vonolel's family was Lalburha. Lalburha had refused to submit to the payment of house tax or the supply of coolies and rice. McCabe had ordered Lalburha to supply 100 coolies which he refused. As a result, McCabe decided to visit the village. McCabe moved and set up camp at Lalburha's village to collect revenue and maintain a base of operations. The eastern Lushai's were not hostile to the new house taxes with the exceptions of Lalburha, Buangtheuva and Pâwibâwia. The second faction would be the descendants of Vûta. Lalburha had called a meeting of Lalvunga, Pâwibâwia, Liankhama, Buangtheuva, Lalhruma, Vanphunga, Poiboi's mother at Sesawng to plan the rising.

The British garrison forcibly entered and occupied Lalburha's village. The Lushais burnt down their houses with the intention of trapping the British into a hilly ravine. The British maintained their volleys and scattered the Lushai attackers. McCabe sent a heliographic message to G.H. Loch at Fort Aijal to inform western chiefs not to shelter the eastern chiefs. The operations against Lalburha continued from 3–17 March 1892. The Lushais would also ambush the logistics and transports of supplies to the British. Forces from Pâwibâwia, Liankhama and Buangtheuva aided Lalburha in his siege of McCabes position between 1 March and 10 April 1892. On 4 April, Lalburha and Pâwibâwia raided the Boruncherra tea estate in Hailakandi to divert the British forces in vain. The raid saw 45 individuals killed and 13 captured. Due to the nature of guerilla warfare the British found too difficult to locate the attackers head on. McCabe was reinforced from the 18th Bengal Infantry from Aijal. Lalburha's stronghold in the East would be sacked as retribution for the assaults. Before the end of May, Lalburha became a fugitive, and the resistance of Lalburha's family began to cease. Lalburha would eventually surrender in 1896 after being a fugitive since 1892. This is due to the punitive expedition against Kairûma in 1895.

McCabe began a practice of burning down villages and specifically targeting grain storages to force the Lushais to cooperate. Before attacking Pâwibâwia in 1892, McCabe wrote:

I cannot reiterate too strongly how firmly I am convinced that burning a Lushai village and withdrawing is no punishment. We must hunt the enemy down from camp to camp and jhum to jhum, destroy his crops and granaries and force them by want and privation to accede to our terms. We cannot expect the chance of a fair stand-up fight and in Jungle warfare of the type met with in these hills, we must anticipate that one's losses in actual fighting will exceed those of the enemy. Exposure and starvation are our strongest allies and with their assistance I believe that the Lushais will very shortly be craving for peace.

— R.B McCabe, Note from R.B McCabe

Military aid was approved in putting down the Eastern Lushai Rising. The 18th Bengal Infantry, under Lieutenant Colonel R.H.F. Rennick, brought a force of 300 to Fort Aijal. The force relived the military police in handling operations in the area. A 14 mile road was built from Aijal to Sonai to maintain communication with the headquarters. Rennick's force maintained logistics and supply to McCabe's operations in the Eastern Lushai Hills.

In Mid-April, McCabe and Loch with 400 military police personnel moved against the villages of Kairûma and Pâwibâwia. On the other hand, Shakespear with 200 men advanced north. Poiboi's village was stormed at a climb of over 2,00 feet. The village consisted of 722 houses. As a result, McCabe captured Pâwibâwia on 14 April. On 10 May, a column under May Captain Rose joined with Shakespear in skirmishes at Daokoma's villages. The Eastern Lushais after becoming desperate attempted to request help from the western chiefs who were historical enemies with them. Vuta's son, Kairûma sent his upa to Sailianpuia. Sailianpuia refused due to the examples made of resisting chiefs like his brothers Kalkhama and Lianphunga. On 7 May, Buangtheuva was captured. McCabe continued his pacification campaign and captured Buangtheuva, Lalhruya, Tankama, Vanphunga, and Pâeibâwi's mother. The campaign lasted from 10 April to 8 June 1892. As a result the Eastern Lushais agreed to pay the house tax and to supply coolie labour to the British.

Eastern Lushai Chiefs Family Tree

Lallula
Mângpawrha	Lallianvunga	Lalpuiliana	Vûta	Neipuithangi
Suakpuilala	Ngûra	Lalphunga	Thâwmvunga	Lalsavunga
Vanpuilala	Pâwibâwia	Lalruma	Chenglena	Vanhnuailiana	Laltheri
Lalhleia	Doțhiauva	Liankhama	Ropuiliani	Lalburha	Buangtheuva
Thangkâma	Vanphunga	Lalruaia	Lalthuama
Langthanglula	Sanglura	Lalvunga	Lungliana	Kairûma	Lalkhûma

== Southern Lushai revolt ==
C.S Murray, the first political officer of the Southern Lushai Hills were to pacify the tribes and to implement the policies of house tax and coolie quotas. Murray's conduct with a chief known as Zakapa was recorded as the beginning of the Southern Lushai revolt. Resistances were also made by chieftesses such as Ropuiliani. There was little to no fighting in the South Luahsi Hills and Johgn Shakespear with Lt. Townsey had been reinforcing the British troops in the north against the western and eastern risings.

=== Zakapa's Revolt ===
The British originally recorded that Murray demanded coolies from Zakapa, who was originally friendly to Murray. Zakapa had agreed to supply the labourers to Murray without any issues. Zakapa's subordinate chief, Daokopa, provided 59 labourers for the coolie service. On the third day of Murray's meeting with Zakapa, a disagreement escalated into violence. Proceedings of the Lieutenant Governor of Bengal ascribe more than a coolie issue for the cause of an outbreak. Murray had requested two girls from Zakapa as sexual companions for himself and Mr Taylor. Murray attempted to explain his intentions by threatening to Zakapa that failure to do so would see his wife and the wives of other chiefs be taken from them to fulfil this demand. Zakapa, in the belief of his threat, acted for the security of his wife.

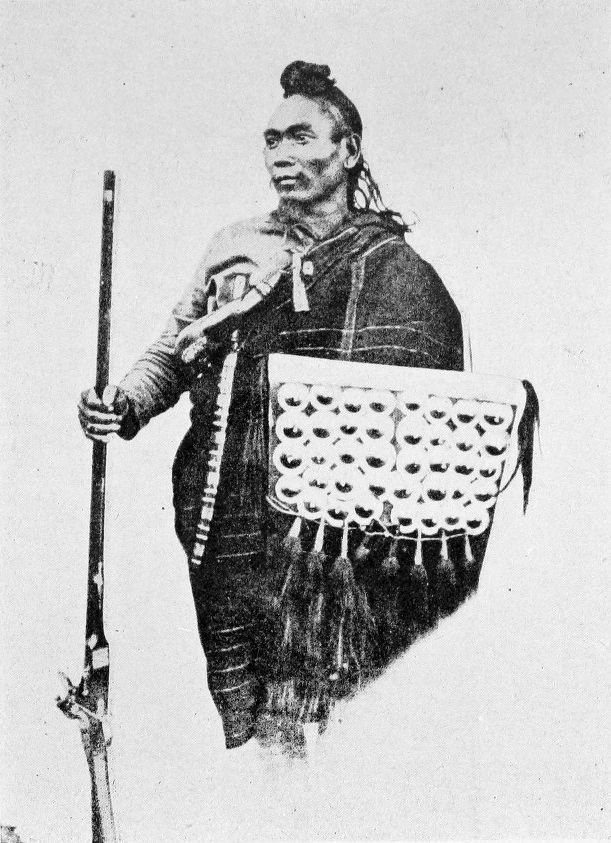
Zakapa, a Fanai chief.

The day after Murray's immoral request, both Lalthuama and Zakapa refused to meet with Murray. Murray and Taylor subsequently trespassed and entered a conference between Lalthuama and Zakapa in their zawlbûk. Murray ordered the other chiefs to leave, and Zakapa obliged despite having the power to attack Murray. Murray and Zakapa held a solitary conversation afterwards. After the conversation, Murray went to the rice stock of the village and set it on fire. This action aggravated the Lushais, who began to attack him. Murray's guards were killed due to being surrounded on all sides by Lushai gunmen shooting at them. Taylor was severely wounded in the attack while Murray escaped. Being vastly outnumbered, Murray opted to escape through a hilly stream, leaving behind his men, ammunition, money and supplies. Subadar Sangram Singh and Havildar Chandra Sing Thapa of the Chittagong F.P distinguished themselves in the skirmish with Subedar losing an arm. As a result both were rewarded the Indian Order of Merit.

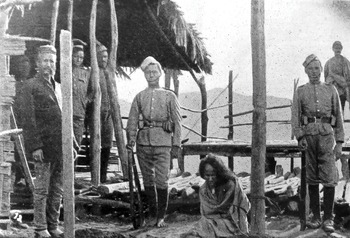
Zakapa on the day he was captured by John Shakespear.

Captain Hutchinson made an advance on the failure of Murray to pacify the settlement of Zakapa. A meeting was also intended between the political officers on 22 February 1892. On 25 February, McCabe sent a letter for Murray stating his position. Murray turned down the meeting and hence affected the administrations faith in him as a political officer. Hutchinson's attack on Zakapa's village failed to capture Zakapa. However, success was made in capturing allied chiefs of Zakapa such as Lalchuma, Dokopa, Kapchunga and Leinkhama who were arrested but liberally treated. Zakapa would be captured years later by John Shakespear.

On 16 March 1892 when C.S. Murray was removed as political officer, the chiefs led a coordinate revolt. While Shakespear and Townsey were at Lungrang and Zote the Lushais attacked them and began a skirmish at Leite as well. Shakespear and his followered had to improve a camp and fortify themselves at Chhipphir. All the southern chiefs except Vandula surrounded Shakespear and were closing in on the force until relief from Burma reinforced Shakespear.

=== Ropuiliani's Resistance ===
Another chief resisting the British was Ropuiliani. Ropuiliani was the mother of Lalthuama and the wife of the late Chief Vandula and daughter of the famous Vonolel. Ropuiliani had seen the impact of the British expedition on his relatives. Many of her sons and brothers died resisting the British. The suppression of the Chin-Lushai Expedition saw the Vandula's descendants become destitute. All of the leaders of settlements were widows with the exception of the two settlements of Aitur and Malthuna. Ropuiliani's influence spread to her son lalthuama who withheld cooperation with the British. Lalthuama withheld tributes and labour quotas. Ropuiliani ruled the village of Ralvawng. She had considerable influence on her youngest son Lalthuama who she encouraged to resist the British. An interpreter named Satinkhara who came to demand coolies and chickens for the British was insulted by Ropuiliani. She considered him loathsome as a freed bawi. Her complaints requested someone to kill the interpreter, which led to a Pasalṭha named Hnawncheuva shooting and killing Satinkhara on his next visit to Ralvawng. Ropuiliani did not pay any taxes that the British had made policies of for the Lushai Hills. She declared her land and subjects not to be obligated to pay or serve anyone else and to chase out the aliens from their settlement.

Captain Shaekespare and 80 men were deployed in August 1893 at Ropuiliani and Lalthuama's villages. A fine of 30 guns, 1 gayal, 10 pigs, 10 goats, 20 chickens and 100 maunds of rice were demanded to be brought to the Mat river to the column. Ropuiliani and Lalthuama did not comply.

Ropuiliani had been cooperating with Daokoma in a conspiracy to attack the British along with some other northern chiefs. Reports of coolies cut up also encouraged a British response. In March 1894, Captain Shakespear, Pugh and Hutchinson arrived at Ropuiliani's village in secret. They attacked the villages suddenly and swiftly. This led to the capture of both Ropuiliani and her son Lalthuama. Daokoma, who conspired with Ropuiliani, had left the village a day before the party arrived to arrange another uprising. Ropuiliani and Lalthuama were deported and their villages were fined. Ropuiliani and Lalthuama were incarcerated in Chittagong jail and leniently treated before Ropuiliani died in prison on 3 January 1895.

=== Vansanga's resistance ===
After the death of Ropuiliani in prison, Shakespear was besieged in an outpost he occupied at Chhiphir, a village he had captured from Vansanga. Captain Shakespeare was able to hold off with the loyalty and friendship of Chief Lalluauva. While Shakespear was besieged, Vansanga's mother the chieftainess of Zote, laid a trap for Shakespear by inviting him to visit her claiming to wish to be on friendlier terms. Shakespeare's interpreter, Dâra, warned Shakespear to not trust her as the chance of deceit is high. The force set out with Shakespear and were ambushed but managed to overpower the attackers and captured the settlement of Zote. Bugler Doluta saved Captain Shakespear's life by shooting a hidden musketman inside the Chief's house.

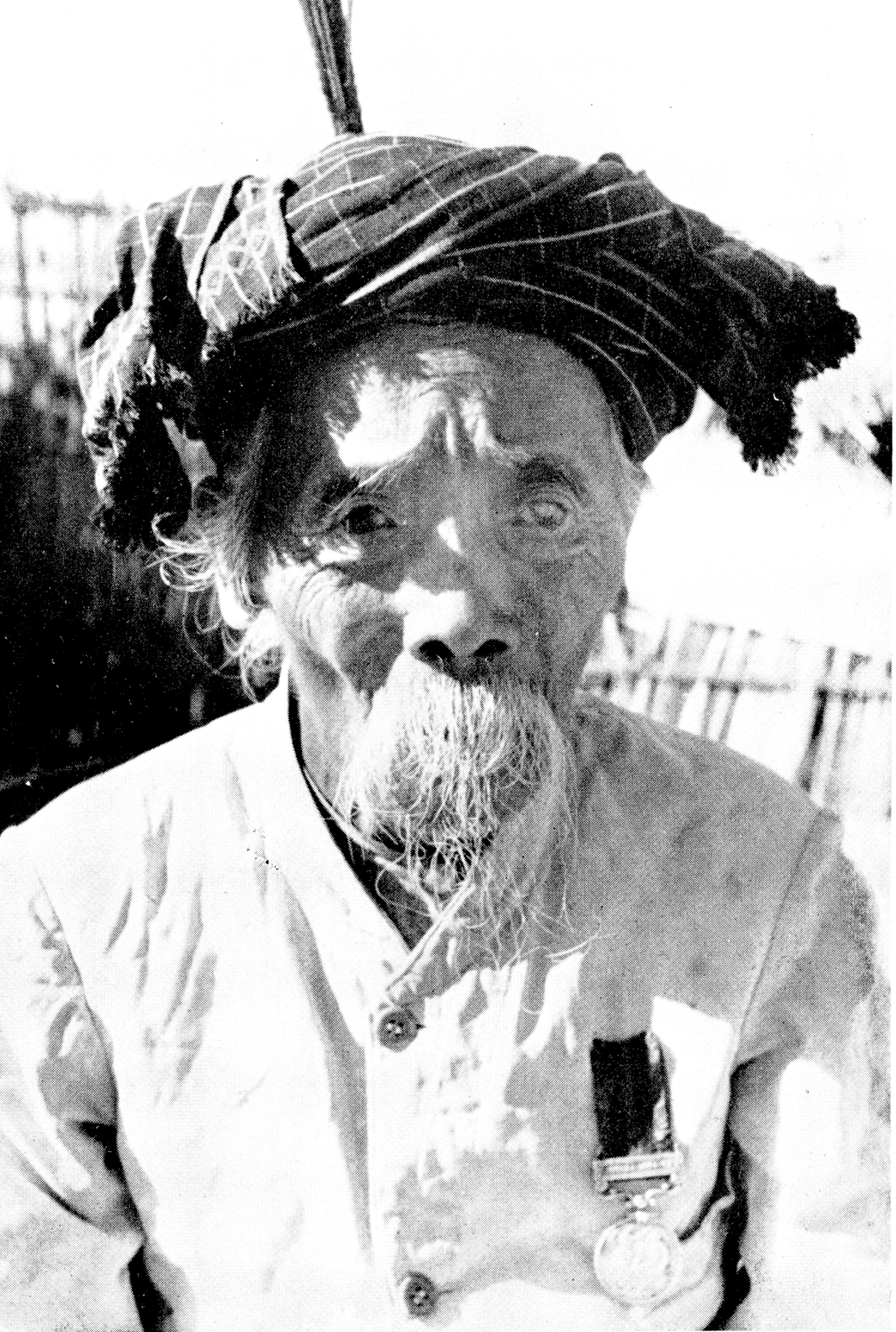
Pu Dâra, interpreter and friend of John Shakespear (British Army officer) at 90.

Shakespeare continued further where he met an older Lushai woman escaping the village of Lungrang. Lungrang had been collecting Lushais to amass an attack on Shakespear. At Lungrang village, the Lushai army had positioned itself at the top of a precipice above Shakespeare and his party. Dâra warned Shakespear to not force the attack. The Lushais continued to threaten Shakespear after he shot some rounds into the sky. Shakespeare's engineers found another approach to the rock heights to the rear while the attention was placed on the front facing section. 30 men attacked the Lushais from the rear which scattered the warriors and allowed occupation of the village. Dâra later suggested that the party capture Vansanga, the area's biggest and most elusive chief.

Shakespear and his party arrived at Vansanga's settlement Cheribawk after investigating villages for information. The party staged a nighttime ambush and captured Vansanga, who was drunk and asleep. Vansanga was bound and jailed in Fort Lungleh before being released in bad health. Vansanga later died in his village.

== Kairuma's Punitive Expedition ==
By the end of 1892, the West, East and South Lushai Hills had been effectively dealt with. Combined resistance was rendered unlikely with the responses of the British officers. Kairuma was the exception of a chief who remained unbeaten. A.N Davis feared Kairuma, who was the unpunished chief throughout the Chin-Lushai Expedition and the Lushai Rising.

In 1895, Kairuma refused to supply coolie labour and refused to pay the fine for failing to do so. As a result, forces from Aizawl and Burma coordinated an attack on Kairuma the same day. G.H Loch with Lieutenant Wilson of the 44th Gurkha Rifles and Lieutenant Clay of the 43rd Gurkha rifles and 300 North Lushai military police worked with Shakespear's column. There was no resistance. Kairuma's village was burned down with his gayal, and animals seized. Kairuma surrendered by giving up his guns and paying all his fines.

== End of the Rising ==
Superintendent of the North Lushai Hills, A Porteus, commented that the long series of Lushai expeditions had ended, and no further operations on the scale of subjugating the chiefs would be necessary again in May 1896. On Porteus' report on the history of 1896-1897, he comments that:

I leave the district with practically all the Chiefs reconciled to Government, and with, I believe, not the least likelihood of any future distrubance of the peace.... Lalbura received me in his village in March like any other chief, while Kairuma met me outside his village, no sepoys, however, being present.

— A. Porteus, Report on the History of 1896-1897

Kairuma's defiance was considered the last form of resistance to British rule as the Lushai Hills began to become influenced by their new conditions such as missionaries, written language, schools, etc.

== See also ==
- Chin Rising

== Sources ==
- Chatterjee, Suhas (1985). British rule in Mizoram. New Delhi: Mittal Publications.
- Chatterjee, Subhas (1995). Mizo Chiefs and the Chiefdom. New Delhi: M D Publications PVT LTD. ISBN 81-85880-72-7.
- National Archives of India. "Rising in Lushai Land- Excellent service uncleared by Surgeon H.B. Melville". Indian Ministry of Culture. Ministry of Culture.
- Lalthangliana, B. (2005). Culture and Folklore of Mizoram. India: Publicans Division, Ministry of information and broadcasting.
- McCall, Anthony Gilchrist (1949). Lushai Chrysalis. London: Luzac.
- Reid, Robert (1942). The Lushai Hills: culled from History of the frontier areas bordering on Assam from 1883-1941. Calcutta: Firma KLM.
- Shakespear, L.W (1929). History of the Assam Rifles. London: Macmillan and Co, Limited.
- Jackson, Kyle (2023). The Mizo Discovery of the British Raj. Vancouver: Cambridge University Press. doi:10.1017/9781009267359. ISBN 978-1-009-26735-9.
