= Lianphunga =

Western Lushai chief

- Chief of Lungtian; Lungtian Lal
- Predecessor: Suakpuilala
- Successor: Suaknuna
- Born: Reiek
- Died: 12 February 1891; Hazaribagh Jail, Bihar
- House: Sailo
- Father: Suakpuilala
- Religion: Sakhua

Lianphunga (d. 1891; English: Lengpunga) was a western Mizo chief. He was known for his raids inciting the Chin-Lushai Expedition and his participation in the Lushai Rising.

== Early life ==
Lianphunga was the second living son of Suakpuilala. During the Lushai Expedition the western chiefs including Lianphunga supported the British with informers and guides.

== Chieftainship ==
=== East-West War ===
With the breakout of the East-West war of the Lushai Hills, Lianphunga was established with a village at Parvatui. He had previously advised his father Suakpuilala to move back from Tachhip which was too close to the eastern chiefs such as Liankhama who was encouraged to attack the closely settled jhum plots. However, Lianphunga sided with his father and began to clear the jungle to settle jhum plots. Chief Buangcheuva of Hmunpui attacked and chased away the cultivators but Lianphunga resumed clearing the forest. A second attack was mounted but Lianphunga laid out an ambush and managed to shoot and kill one of them which officially began to war between the east and west Lushai Hills.

=== Anti-Sailo Rebellion ===
After villagers began to depose their chiefs, Vanphunga of Hmawngkhawn fled to Lianphunga's village of Lungtian. Panphunga declared that Lianphunga was free to take whatever he wanted. Lianphunga was accompanied by Lalhuma and visited Hmawngkhawn which was fortified by the people and armed at the entrance. Lianphunga was threatened that if he crossed the bamboo line at the entrance he would be shot. Lalhluma declared his name and stepped beyond the line. A gun misfired upon him and the villagers subjugated themselves. Lianphunga took whatever he wanted that belonged to Vanphunga and restored his chieftainship once more.

=== Chengri Valley raid ===
Lianphunga established his chiefdom on the borders of the south Lushai Hills bordering the Chittagong Hill Tracts. He was influential over his younger brother Zahrawka. The Reangs inhabiting the Chengri Valley were raided jointly by Lianphunga and his brother Zahrawka in January 1888. Lianphunga is said to have made his son Suaknuna spear the opposing chief's son after they were captured during the raid and brought back to the village. Sialianpuia, the brother of Lianphunga was also invited to partake in the raid, but upon declining cooperation was dubbed "wearers of women's clothes" for the caution.

The raid resulted in the death of 101 people and the capture of 60 captives to become bawis. The reasoning for the Chengri Valley raid was the protection of land claims and preventing the settlement of others on such land. In particular, the land was known as an elephant hunting ground, which was being converted into grassland, which the chiefs did not like. The journey saw seven captives die along the way to his village. He refused to free more captives upon British capture claiming it cost him ₹3,300 and that he would not free them until it was paid. An agent of Hill Tipperah, which took a loan from him and his subjects, failed to pay him back, and this encouraged him to raid. Lianphunga released several captives in return for money. He received ₹185 but released captives on the conditions that he would be owed a further ₹515.

Interrogated in capture, Lianphunga claimed that Zahrawka laid claim to the land of the Chengri Valley and that they assumed, since they weren't under British protection or Tripura, that they asserted their right to the land as an elephant hunting ground. After the Chengri Valley inhabitants began to hover close to the jhum plots, Lianphunga advised Zahrawka to subjugate the villagers and lent some of his warriors.

=== Chin-Lushai Expedition ===
During the Chin-Lushai Expedition, Mr. Daly arrived at Lianphunga's village before Colonel Skinner did. However, Daly was not ordered to interact with Lianphunga with any consequence as this was assigned to Skinner. Lianphunga met with Daly and promised to hand over the captives to him in return for amnesty. Daly however leaning towards an arrest led Lianphunga to argue that the interpreter told him Daly would not arrest him during personal negotiations. Daly agreed on this basis on a promise that Lianphunga would give up to Colonel Skinner. However, Skinner arrived a day earlier than expected and Lianphunga escaped while burning down his village.

=== Lushai Rising ===
After the annexation of the Lushai Hills, Captain H.R. Browne was assigned political officer of the North-Lushai Hills. He was tasked with punishing Lianphunga based on an investigation of his input in the Chengri Valley raid. Browne summoned a conference of western Lushai chiefs. Browne stated in the conference that Lianphunga was to be deposed of chieftainship for five years and that his son Suaknuna would be chief in his stead. A fine of 50 guns were imposed on Lianphunga.

Lianphunga was captured by R.B. McCabe who was sent with his brother Khalkam and Thanghula to Hazaribagh Jail. Lianphunga was deported on the basis that previous punishments were not an effective deterrent. Lianphunga had rebuilt his villages despite being deposed from chieftainship. Lianphunga was arrested under the Bengal Regulation III of 1818.

== Death ==
Lianphunga excused himself to go to the latrines with Khalkam while Thanghula stayed behind. Both had committed suicide by hanging themselves with the cloth of their dhoti. The rope was fixed around the ventilation openings of the latrines up to five feet long. The guards found Khalkam dead on arrival. Lianphunga was found struggling but succumbed shortly afterwards.

== Genealogy ==
Western Lushai-Palian Chiefs Family Tree

Purburha
Sibuta
Chhungpaliana
Lalkhamliana
Kohzasira | Lalpuiliana
Lallula | Bantawia | Lalrihua | Bontai | Liandova
Vûta | Lallianvunga | Lalpuiliana | Mângpawrha | Pi Buki | Lalsuthlaha | Lalhmingsanga | Lal Hlun
Ruthangpi | Rûnphunga | Thâwmpâwnga | Suakpuilala | Banaitangi | Ngursailova | Dorikhuma
Thanghulha | Vanrûma | Laljachera | Bankhampui
Lalchhûnga (d.) (Note: Lalchunga died early making Khalkam the oldest. His sons were raised by Sukpilal.) | Khalkama | Lianphunga | Sailianpui | Thanrûma | Lalhrima | Lalsavunga | Hrangkhupa | Zahrâwka | Dokhûma | Tulêra | Lalsavûta | Thangvûta
Liankunga

== Sources ==
- Chatterjee, Subhas (1995). Mizo Chiefs and the Chiefdom. New Delhi: M D Publications PVT LTD. ISBN 81-85880-72-7.
- Lalthangliana, B. (2005). Culture and Folklore of Mizoram. India: Publicans Division, Ministry of information and broadcasting. ISBN 978-81-230-1309-1.
- McCall, Anthony Gilchrist (1949). Lushai Chrysalis. London: Luzac.
- Reid, Robert (1942). The Lushai Hills: culled from History of the frontier areas bordering on Assam from 1883-1941. Calcutta: Firma KLM.
- Sen, Anandaroop (2022). "Insurgent Law: Bengal Regulation III and the Chin-Lushai Expeditions (1872-1898)" (PDF). Modern Asian Studies. 56 (1): 1515–1555. doi:10.1017/S0026749X21000366.
