= Kalkhama =

Anti-British Western Lushai Chief

- Chief of Sentlang; Sentlang Lal
- Predecessor: Sukpilal
- Died: 12 February 1891; Hazaribagh Jail, Bihar
- House: Sailo
- Father: Sukpilal
- Religion: Sakhua

Kalkhama (Note: Variations: Khalkom, Khalkama) was a Lushai chief of the 19th century. He is known for being the son of Suakpuilala and for being an enemy of the British, which led to the Lushai Rising. Kalkhama was deported to Hazaribagh jail after British capture, where he committed suicide with his brother Lianphunga.

== Chieftainship ==
Kalkhama inherited villages under his father, Suakpuilala, to rule with relative autonomy and independence. He was situated on the border of Cachar. His capital settlement was southwest of Changsil on Sentlung Hill.

=== First East-West War ===
In his youth, Kalkhama fell in love with the Eastern Lushai maiden named Tuali. However, Tuali was prepared to be betrothed to Liankhama, son of Vanhnuailiana. Kalkhama convinced his parents Suakpuilala and Pi Buki, to wage war on Liankhama after the marriage of Tuali. The war continued from 1864 to 1867 and weakened Suakpuilal into entering diplomacy with the British authorities. The result of the war was unsuccessful as Kalkhama failed to take Tuali.

Inpuinu, a regent to her infant son, was a chieftainess who had promised settlements to Vûta. However, she decided to grant them to Kalkhama instead. Vuta raided Inpuinu's village in 1870 but Kalkhama managed to hold onto his settlements regardless.

=== Lushai Expedition ===
To avenge the defeat, Kalkhama aided the British in the Lushai Expedition, which was targeted against the Eastern chiefs. John Ware Edgar, Deputy Commissioner of Cachar, received a visit from Kalkhama and described a path from Tipai Mukh which would make entry into the Lushai Hills for elephants more passable. The general stationed at Silchar felt that the posts established on the Sylhet-Cachar frontier were not sufficiently south to protect the right flank against Suakpuilala and Kalkhama if they united with the Eastern chiefs against the British. As a result, a decision was made to occupy a hill named Benkong and another point near Kolasib hill to have communication channels with Cachar through the Sonai and Dullesur rivers.

This decision to cooperate was made on the belief that the British would aid him in future attacks on the Eastern Lushai chiefs. However, due to the British policy of non-intervention, Kalkhama was not given help; however, for his assistance in the expedition, Kalkhama was gifted authority over Sonai bazaar. However, Kalkhama shifted his diplomacy towards an anti-British one as a result. Kalkhama was one of the few chiefs who did not meet with Major Boyd and Hari-Charan Sharma in their 1874 tour of the Lushai Hills. He even refused to meet with the deputy commissioner of Cachar the following year. Due to the souring of such relations, the Sonai bazaar was closed and in retaliation, Kalkhama raided the Changsil bazaar.

Kalkhama subsequently recruited a mutineer, Rutton Singh, who escaped from Chittagong in the Sepoy Mutiny of 1857. Rutton also held a strong anti-British view and carried out drownings of innocent women and children in the Dhaleswari, which affected Kalkhama's reputation.

=== Second East-West War ===
In early 1877, Kalkhama settled closer into Eastern territory. The jhum fields of Kalkhama began to overlap with territory claimed by Pâwibâwia. As a result, hostilities erupted over the jhum lands. The conflict would escalate into a broader East-West War for a second time. The conflict would see Lalburha attacking Suakpuilala, subsequently, before Suakpuilala and Pâwibâwia erupted into hostilities. The last encounter saw two of Suakpuilala's followers die, with some captured alongside some mithun.

The East and the West formed their coalition of chiefs upon escalation. The eastern coalition oversaw Lalburha, Pâwibâwia, Liankhama, Chunglena and Buangtheuva with Bengkhuaia. The western coalition consisted of Suakpuilala, Pi Buki, Kalkhama, Lianphunga, Sailianpuia and minor chiefs who were vassals to Suakpuilala's clan. In September 1877, Liankhama attacked Kalkhama's settlements and carried off 15 heads to avenge the theft of salt from him. In early 1878, Kalkhama captured men from the eastern chiefs at salt springs in Lengvoi and attempted raids on his Sonai bazaar. After the attempted raid on Sonai bazaar, Liankhama and Pâwibâwia raided Kalkhama's settlements and burned 10 houses, killed 10 men and took 6 captives. In retaliation, Kalkhama attacked Sengvong under Pâwibâwia and captured 5 women with one casualty.

In October 1881, Kalkhama made an abortive attack on Lalhleia. However, the war became unpopular and up to 400 settlers left Kalkhama to resettle in Cachar under the British. Both sides appealed to the Deputy Commissioner of Cachar for intervention against each other, but were refused. A second attempt was made, but for a request for meditation for peace talks instead of intervention. The second East-West War ended with the beginning of the mautam famine. Kalkhama met with Pâwibâwia and Lalhleia and agreed to a cessation of hostilities while they tried to secure food from Cachar. The peace continued until the Luhsai Hills recovered from the famine the next year.

A meeting of western chiefs was held at Kalkhama's capital settlement during the winter of 1883-1884. Kalkhama opposed the idea of attacking the Eastern Lushai chiefs on the basis that he was in the middle of migrating his settlement to a new jhum plot and was unable to commit to another war. Despite peace being established, the British closed down Sonai bazaar out of fear of war erupting in another East-West War.

=== Developments with Sonai Bazaar ===
In March 1876, the traders and merchants at Sonai bazaar caught some thieves and sent them to Kalkhama, who seized the property of the perpetrators. Kalkhama then visited the bazaar and placed a flag claiming it to be under his protection. Despite consisting of 6 shops, the rubber in the Lushail Hills had been depleted from over-harvesting during the mautam famine and a fall in prices overall.

After some skirmishes between the eastern and western chiefs, Kalkhama requested the British to move the Sonai bazaar 20 miles further. He raised concerns on the proximity of the bazaar to his settlement. However the deputy commissioner of Cachar refused as they believed Kalkhama attempted to obfuscate intelligence about his movements. The merchants at Sonai bazaar eventually left in January 1877 due to lack of profitability in the rubber trade. The merchants specifically complained about Kalkhama's upa, Rutton Singh, for extortion practices. Rutton Singh was apprehended but was released immediately to keep good relations with the Lushai chiefs. Kalkhama had believed rumours of Rutton Singh's death and had confiscated his property; however, upon his return, Kalkhama took him back. Rutton Singh did, however, alarm traders and merchants after he murdered the family of an old woman suspected of witchcraft. Rutton Singh would die from drowning in 1884.

After the closure of the Tipaimukh bazaar, Lemkham sent traders to Kalkhama's Sonai Bazaar which had reopened. They purchased salt in exchange for wax, but Kalkhama confiscated the salt from them. Lemkham retaliated through a raid that took 15 heads. Kalkhama committed himself to guarding the bazaar but the lack of profitability led to merchants closing their stalls and leaving. Further conflict with Eastern chiefs led to the shutting down of the bazaar. Kalkhama made attempts to reopen the bazaar alongside eastern chiefs, but all attempts were refused due to concerns over the security of the merchants. After Kalkhama moved east of the Sonai river, the deputy commissioner, on promises made by Liankhama and Pâwibâwia, reopened the bazaar. The merchants refused to make a start on account of a lack of British frontier guards. Furthermore, Kalkhama believed Sonai bazaar was exclusively his and declined to share the rent from the bazaar with the eastern chiefs. The commissioner closed the bazaar once more until the chiefs made a joint agreement. Kalkhama was not affected strongly by the closure of Sonai Bazaar, as he was missing out on rent, but still accessed the Changsil Bazaar close to him.

=== Chin-Lushai Expedition ===
On the morning of 13 December 1888, the village of Pakuma Rani in the Chittagong Hill Tracts was raided. The British authorities initially suspected Kalkhama to be responsible for the raid. The raid saw the chieftainess, an ally of the British, killed alongside 21 men and 15 captives. The true offenders were recognised as Vûta's sons, Nikama, Lungliana and Kairûma. Kalkhama's brothers, Lianphunga and Zahrâwka, also participated in the Chengri Valley raid, which further aggravated British hostilities. This led to the British undertaking a punitive expedition with the occupation of the Lushai Hills necessary to prevent raiding.

=== Western Lushai Rising ===
After the annexation of the Lushai Hills to the British. Kalkhama swore an oath of fealty with H.R. Browne, the North Lushai Hills political officer. However, upon realisation of the taxes and coolie labour quotas, Kalkhama conspired to rebel. Kalkhama held a meeting with many other chiefs and conspired for a rising against Fort Aijal. Kalkhama held the meeting with Thanghulha, Thanruma, Liankunga, Lalhrima, Minthang and Rankupa. H.R Browne was ambushed during a journey between Fort Aijal and Changsil. Browne was mortally wounded and died 15 minutes after reaching Changsil post. Thanruma had met Browne on his journey and informed his accomplices of Browne's whereabouts for the ambush. After the death of Browne, Kalkhama descended on Fort Aijal with allied chiefs. The British were building a second stockade before being confronted and driven into the main stockade. Kalkhama and his men attacked for several hours before reinforcements arrived from Cachar. One party of the reinforcements was ambushed en route to Fort Aijal on the river which led to the murder of Lieutenant Swinton. McCabe took office as political officer and was successful in pursuing the Western chiefs with the Surma Valley police battalion. Kalkhama was overpowered as a result.

Kalkhama surrendered to R.B McCabe on 23 November 1890. He was deported outside of the Lushai Hills with his brothers, Lianphunga and Thanghulha. During trial, Kalkhama was found guilty of the murder of H.R Browne the first political officer of the North Lushai Hills. Browne's killer was identified as Liankunga but Kalkhama was identified as the key leader. R.B McCabe recorded Kalkhama's statement on the murder of H.R Browne:

I took the oath of fealty with Browne Saheb, and he told us that we would have to pay revenue. We did not like this and subsequently when Leipung, a mantri of Lenkhunga told me (Khalkam’s deputation accused Changkunga chaprasi of giving the wrong information that excited the rising) that he had heard the Saheb was going to collect revenue from the Western Lushai first, and then from the Eastern Lushais and that we would not even be allowed liberty to hunt in the jungles. I lost my head and resolved to fight. We came definitely to the resolution about the 1st September (Khama says one month prior to the outbreak.) A meeting was held in my Jolbuk (guest house) at which representatives from Thangula, Thanruma, Lenkhunga, Lalrihma, Minthang and Rankupa were present.

— Statement of Khalkam Raja made before R.B McCabe, Political Officer, North Lushai Hills, Foreign External A Pros. January 1891, Nos. 121–134, NAI. 23 November 1890

Kalkhama confessed on the assumption that nothing was to happen and that he would be able to return to his wife and family. Kalkhama was subsequently surprised when R.B. McCabe informed him to accompany him to Aizawl.

== Biography ==
Western Lushai-Palian Chiefs Family Tree

Purburha
Sibuta
Chhungpaliana
Lalkhamliana
Kohzasira	Lalpuiliana
Lallula	Bantawia	Lalrihua	Bontai	Liandova
Vûta	Lallianvunga	Lalpuiliana	Mângpawrha	Pi Buki	Lalsuthlaha	Lalhmingsanga	Lal Hlun
Ruthangpi	Rûnphunga	Thâwmpâwnga	Suakpuilala	Banaitangi	Ngursailova	Dorikhuma
Thanghulha	Vanrûma	Laljachera	Bankhampui
Lalchhûnga (d.) (Note: Lalchunga died early making Khalkam the oldest. His sons were raised by Sukpilal.)	Khalkama	Lianphunga	Sailianpui	Thanrûma	Lalhrima	Lalsavunga	Hrangkhupa	Zahrâwka	Dokhûma	Tulêra	Lalsavûta	Thangvûta
Liankunga

=== Early life ===
Kalkhama was recorded by the British as the eldest son of Suakpuilala. This was because the oldest son was already deceased, so Kalkhama held the privilege. He was the second son of Sukpilal's eldest wife.

=== Death ===
Kalkhama was arrested under the Bengal Regulation III of 1818. The justification for Kalkhama's detention was provided on the basis that he and other chiefs were responsible for a rise in violence termed the "Western Lushai uprising". Kalkhama was found guilty of the murder of the first political officer of North Lushai Hills, H.R. Browne. As a result, Kalkhama was placed in Hazaribagh Jail in Bihar. On 12 September 1891, the foreign secretary to the government of the British Raj received a telegram from the Government of Bengal. The message stated that two of the Lushai chiefs captured by R.B. McCabe, political officer of the North Lushai Hills, had committed suicide in Hazaribagh prison. Kalkhama was found dead in the latrines of the prison. The authorities speculated that Kalkhama had managed to keep extra cloth secretly over time until enough could be used to hang himself. The guard on duty Saiphu Singh reported:

The three Lushais were inside the dormitory. After some time, the two deceased said they wanted to go to the privy to ease themselves; I told them to go and they went, the third (Thangula) remaining in the dormitory. I stood outside on the path. As they were some time I at last went down and called to ask why they were so long. They did not answer; I went in and saw them both suspended to the window. Khalkam was quite dead. Liengpunga was still struggling; I lifted him up, but he expired. I cut down Khalkam. Then I went out and met the Jailor coming up.

— Notes of enquiry into the suicide of two Lushai chiefs, C.J.S Faulder, October 1891

== Sources ==
- Chatterjee, Suhas (1985). British rule in Mizoram. New Delhi: Mittal Publications.
- Chatterjee, Suhas (1995). Mizo Chiefs and the Chiefdom. New Delhi: Mittal Publications. ISBN 81-85880-72-7.
- Elly, E.B. (1893). Military Report on The Chin-Lushai Country. Calcutta: Firma KLM Private Limited.
- Guite, Jangkhomang (September 2014). "Colonialism and its Unruly? The Colonial State and Kuki Raids in Nineteenth Century Northeast India". Modern Asian Studies. 48 (5): 1118–1232. doi:10.1017/S0026749X12000674. ProQuest 1550073156.
- McCall, Anthony Gilchrist (1949). Lushai Chrysalis. London: Luzac.
- Mackenzie, Alexander (1884). History of the Relations of the Government with the Hill Tribes of the North-East Frontier of Bengal. Calcutta: Home Department Press.
- Nag, Sajal (2008). Pied Pipers in North-East India: Bamboo-flowers, Rat-famine and the Politics of Philanthropy. (1881-2007). New Delhi: Manohar Publishers & Distributors. ISBN 978-81-7304-311-6.
- Reid, Robert (1942). The Lushai Hills: culled from History of the frontier areas bordering on Assam from 1883-1941. Calcutta: Firma KLM.
- Sen, Anandaroop (2022). "Insurgent Law: Bengal Regulation III and the Chin-Lushai Expeditions (1872-1898)" (PDF). Modern Asian Studies. 56 (1): 1515–1555. doi:10.1017/S0026749X21000366.
  - Shakespear, L.W (1929). History of the Assam Rifles. London: Macmillan and Co, Limited.
- Tribal Research Institute (1978). The Lushais 1878-1889. Aizawl: Firma KLM Private Limited.
- Woodthorpe, Robert Gosset (1873). The Lushai Expedition, 1871-1872. London: Hurst and Blackett Publishers.
- Zou, S. Thangboi (2019). "Riverine bazaars, trade and chiefs in the colonial Lushai Hills". Asian Ethnicity. 22 (4): 563–582. doi:10.1080/14631369.2019.1687284.
