= Vanpuilala =

Eastern Mizo chief ()

- Chief of Khawlian; Khawlian Lal
- Successor: Disputed regency Lalhlira
- Regent: Lalhlupuii
- Born: 1840
- Died: 1869 (aged 28–29); Khawlian
- Spouse: Chawngpuitiali
- Issue: Lalhlira
- House: Sailo
- Father: Ngûra
- Mother: Lalhlupuii
- Religion: Sakhua

Vanpuilala (c. 1840-1869) was a Mizo chief in the Eastern Lushai Hills (now Mizoram). He raised the issue of British land enterprises encroaching on traditional hunting grounds and ruled over more than 1,000 houses at Khawlian. His death lead to a competing right to regency between his mother and his wife.

== Early life ==
Vanpuilala was born to Chief Ngûra who was the son of Lallianvunga and grandson of Lallula. His mother was Lalhlupuii, the daughter of Laltuaka. Vanpuilala has been argued to be the only son by several authors with few stating that he was among eight children. Vanpuilala was born around January 1850; however, he was recorded as having married in 1861, which makes the date of birth improbable. The date 1840-1841 has been offered as a more probable date when compared with the date of his father's death in 1849 and the ascendence of his mother as regent.

== Chieftainship ==
Ngûra died in 1849 while Vanpuilala was a child and unfit to rule. As a result, his mother Lalhlupuii became regent of the villagers and ruled with the guidance of the upas. Vanpuilala was married in 1861 to Chawngpuitiali, the daughter of Lalsavunga. Vanpuilala had married prior to this with a woman named Pibuki but separated after being unable to bear a child. Vanpuilala shifted his village to Khawlian and ruled with 1040 households with as many as ten zawlbûks.

Vanpuilala was also the chief responsible for communicating to the British that the development of tea estates in Assam were encroaching on their native land. Vanpuilala had minor incidents with the British but died before it managed to escalate. Vanpuilala sent his envoys to the British officer Captain Stewart and followed Suakpuilala's policy of establishing diplomatic relations with the British. When the envoys explained the issues of the encroaching garden estates, Stewart attempted to alleviate their concerns stating that the gardens would bring them prosperity. The British considered enterprise with the Mizo tribes on this basis.

Following the raids under Suakpuilala in November 1868 on the British, Vanpuilala became a target for the failed Lushai Expedition of 1869. The Eastern Column reached Bazar Ghat on the Sonai River and met with envoys of Vanpuilala. The envoys announced Vanpuilal's death a few days before the column reached the location. Assurances were given of non-complicity in the raids, and the column thus withdrew as they could not justify any hostility to the villages. Lalhlupuii, who negotiated with the British, tendered her submission and promised to aid them in procuring the captives and refugees of the raids.

Vanpuilala was famed for his reputation as a warrior that even the King of Manipur was aware of him. His household held over 30 bawis. He ruled over mostly individuals of the Ralte clan and was given the Ralte title of Vanrawng.

== Later life ==
Vanpuilala has been assumed to have died in 1868. British ethnographers have stated 1869 as the year of his death. The cause of his death has been speculated to be poisoning by his own guest. His tomb was built as three platforms of stone where he was buried underneath. Around him heads of animals and a pony gifted from the Manipur King were hung on posts. He was buried with zû. He was buried without any human heads.

Following his death, a power struggle emerged between his wife, Chawngpuitiali, and his mother, Lalhlupuii, to become regents and rule as chiefs. Lalhlupuii in Dawlawn village claimed regency as the lalnu. Chawngpuitiali lived with her supporters at Khawlek and claimed to the British to manage the village as the sole regent. Vanpuilala's son was Lalhilira, who was recorded by the British as Lalhi. Chawngpuitiali sought the assistance of Pâwibâwia as her brother in disputes against Lalhlupuii. She further sought the help of Kalkhama and Suakpuilala.

== Genealogy ==
Eastern Lushai Chiefs Family Tree

Lallula
Mângpawrha	Lallianvunga	Lalpuiliana	Vûta	Neipuithangi
Suakpuilala	Ngûra	Lalphunga	Thâwmvunga	Lalsavunga
Vanpuilala	Pâwibâwia	Lalruma	Chenglena	Vanhnuailiana	Laltheri
Lalhleia	Doțhiauva	Liankhama	Ropuiliani	Lalburha	Buangtheuva
Thangkâma	Vanphunga	Lalruaia	Lalthuama
Langthanglula	Sanglura	Lalvunga	Lungliana	Kairûma	Lalkhûma

== Sources ==
- Mackenzie, Alexander (1884). History Of The Relations Of The Government With The Hill Tribes Of The North-east Frontier Of Bengal. Calcutta: Home Department Press. p. 321.
- Rosanga, O. (2009). "Vanpuilala". Historical Journal Mizoram. X (1).
- Sangkima (2004). Essays on the History of the Mizos. Guwahati: Spectrum Publications. ISBN 81-87502-77-0.
