= Banaitangi =

Mizo Chieftainess of Western Lushai Hills

- Chiefainess; Lal
- Predecessor: Mângpawrha
- Born: 1835
- Died: 1884 (aged 48–49); Tanhril (borough of present-day Aizawl)
- Spouse: Ngursailova (February 1865)
- Issue: Laljachaja, Van Khampui
- House: Sailo
- Father: Lalmanga
- Mother: Pi Buki
- Religion: Sakhua

Banaitangi (Note: Variations: Banaithangi, Banaitongi, Vanhnuaithangi) was a Lushai chieftainess known as the sister of Sukpilal and wife of Ngursailova. She is most known for her beauty and poetry at the time and her separation from her husband. She was the first Lushai chieftainess to venture into the plains of Bengal.

== Chieftainship ==
After Banaitangi was married to Ngursailova, she gained a positive reputation as a kind and compassionate chief compared to others. Due to the fact that Ngursailova spent time with his father, Lalchukla, who was captive in Sylhet, Banaitangi was encouraged to take an interest in public life and facets of chieftainship. She was the first Lushai chieftainess to come down to the plains of Sylhet, Agartala and Dhaka.

=== Quarrel with her husband ===
Ngursailova after marriage found Banaitangi to be an expensive wife. Banaitangi took control of managing estates and taking on roles of chieftainship in Ngursailova's absence. Laljeeka also raided Ngursailova's settlements as a revenge for Banaitangi'sa marriage rejection. In return, Sukpilal took revenge on Laljeeka and forced him to take refuge under the eastern chiefs. Due to these issues, and Banaitangi's acumen in accumulating influence over his own power, Ngursailova under the influence of Zu (rice beer) assaulted Banaitangi. Banaitangi in return swore revenge and Ngursailova ordered her arrest. In the middle of the night, Banaitangi with a few loyal nobles escaped Ngursailova's village in January 1871 and in three days managed to reach Sukpilal's village of Reiek. Petty chiefs such as Roona and Mona followed her as well. Sukpilal and her mother Pi Buki made peace with Laljeeka to invade Ngursailova's estate. Banaitangi ruled her own estates similar to before her marriage as an independent chieftainess. Ngursailova attempted to mend the separation and offer her to raise his sons but she refused and he died soon after.

=== Later life ===
Banaitangi after the death of her husband followed customary practices on widowhood. She observed widow penance known as thlahual. Upon meeting with Major Boyd in 1881 her poor health had physically aged her further than she truly was. She clad herself in a white sari during her widow years. She also conducted an interview in Bengali with Boyd's assistant Hari Charan Sharma in her settlement's zawlbuk on 3 February 1881. The interview was a surprise to British officials as the trial of her father-in-law Lalchukla had created opposition from chiefs to cooperate with the British. Due to this, she is considered the first Lushai lady and chieftainess to hold diplomatic relations with the British.

== Biography ==
Western Lushai-Palian Chiefs Family Tree

Purburha
Sibuta
Chhungpaliana
Lalkhamliana
Kohzasira	Lalpuiliana
Lallula	Bantawia	Lalrihua	Bontai	Liandova
Vûta	Lallianvunga	Lalpuiliana	Mângpawrha	Pi Buki	Lalsuthlaha	Lalhmingsanga	Lal Hlun
Ruthangpi	Rûnphunga	Thâwmpâwnga	Suakpuilala	Banaitangi	Ngursailova	Dorikhuma
Thanghulha	Vanrûma	Laljachera	Bankhampui
Lalchhûnga (d.) (Note: Lalchunga died early making Khalkam the oldest. His sons were raised by Sukpilal.)	Khalkama	Lianphunga	Sailianpui	Thanrûma	Lalhrima	Lalsavunga	Hrangkhupa	Zahrâwka	Dokhûma	Tulêra	Lalsavûta	Thangvûta
Liankunga

=== Early life ===
Banaitangi was born to Chief Mângpawrha and his wife Pi Buki in 1835. She was the sister of Suakpuilala and granddaughter of Lallula.

=== Marriage and family ===
Banaitangi was married to Ngursailova in February of 1885. She had two sons namely Laljachaja and Bamkhampui. For her marriage, Sukpilal raided Adampore and provided several Bengali maidens to serve her in her new life. Due to this, Banaitangi became fluent in Bengali. Oral history recounts Banaitangi's beauty and how high her bride price was as a result which prevented many Lushai chiefs from being able to marry her. A southern chief named Laljeeka offered to marry Banaitangi but she refused him but she was already arranged to be married to her cousin Ngursailova. However, the marriage to Ngursailova was delayed due to the expenses of conducting the trial on Lalchukla. It is said it took two years for Ngursailova to afford the bride price for Banaitangi as a result. For their marriage, Banaitangi composed her own hla (song/poem).

=== Death ===
Banaitangi died in 1885 in her own settlement. Her legacy saw a fusion and acceptance of cultural practices from the plains. She introduced Hindu melodies into Mizo hla and mixed traditional puan cloths with artistic embroideries through Muslim and Hindu accessories. However, most of her poems are lost or corrupted through village bards, largely lost to time. Her son Bankhampui became a renowned poet.

== Sources ==
- Chatterjee, Suhas (1985). British rule in Mizoram. New Delhi: Mittal Publications.
- Chatterjee, Suhas (1994). Making of Mizoram: Role of Laldenga. new Delhi: M D Publications. ISBN 81-85880-38-7.
- Chatterjee, Suhas (1995). Mizo Chiefs and the Chiefdom. New Delhi: Mittal Publications. ISBN 81-85880-72-7.
- Chatterjee, Suhas (1990). Mizo Encyclopaedia. Aizawl: Jaico Publishing House.
