= Lalsuthlaha =

Western Mizo chief (c.1795-c.1871)

- Born: Jampui Tong, Hill Tipperah
- Died: Sylhet
- Occupation: Paitu/Paitoo chieftain
- Years active: 1843-1845
- Known for: Kachu-Bari raid of 1844
- Criminal charges: murder, rioting
- Children: Ngursailova; Dukunipur
- Father: Lalrihua
- Relatives: Botai (Brother)

Lalsuthlaha, (c. 1795-c. 1871) known by the British as Lalchukla (Note: variations: Lal Chokla; Lalsuktla) was a Mizo chief of the Palian clan. He was recorded as ruler of the group recorded as the "Poitoo" (Paihtê) clan.

The term "Poitoo" was first used in 1824 in a British report applying a name to the Lushai and Kuki peoples of the eastern and northern hills, described as the most turbulent and formidable of the tribes. The Poitoos inhabited Thanghum village and numbered 50,000-60,000 on the right bank of the Surma river. The Poitoo Kukis occupied the eastern areas of Hill Tipperah and some branches acknowledged allegiance to the King. These people are now known as the Paite.

Lalsuthlaha is known for being one of the earliest chiefs to interact with the British through raiding. Lalsuthlaha was a close associate of Hill Tipperah in following the diplomacy of his father Lalrihua. Lalsuthlaha's raid of Kachubari saw British retaliation which led to him being caught. His trial was under English common law, and he was sentenced to life in captivity with deportation. Lalsuthlaha would surrender under the assumed condition that he wouldn't be held captive or executed. Upon deportation from his settlement, many Mizo chiefs viewed this as a breach of faith and a source of resistance to cooperating with the British.

== Blackwood Expedition ==
After the death of his father, Chief Lalrihua, Lalsuthlaha succeeded him in chieftainship in 1843 as the eldest son. Subsequently, on the night of 16 April 1844, Lalsuthlaha established a raiding party armed with muskets and weapons. The party was estimated to be as large as 200 raiders. The party descended upon the settlement of Kachubari In Sylhet. The resulting raid saw many individuals captured and up to 20 heads taken. Further damage included the burning of houses and the razing of the entire village. Cultivators refused to return to their settlements on the borders without an increase in police and armed forces for this reason.

The nature of the raid prompted British authorities, such as Sealy, the magistrate of Sylhet, to conduct an investigation. The results showed that Lalsuthlaha and his relative Bantawia were responsible. The British authorities officially filed the incident as a ritual to procure a chieftain's funeral, as Mizos did practice headhunting. The authorities based this on eyewitnesses who saw the ritual drying of Lalrihua's corpse in the house courtyard. Mackenzie described the reasoning as the traditional Lushai practice was for a chief to be accompanied by servants in the afterlife, which meant requiring captives from raiding to fulfil the number of heads to assure a good afterlife.

Lalsuthlaha was under the territory of the Raja of Tripura at the time. Krishna Kishor Manikya was held accountable for the misconduct of the tribes under his nominal control. Since Mizo tribes offered commodities such as elephant tusks as tributes, they were seen as tributaries to Tripura and hence responsible. British officials originally suspected the Krishna Manikya's statement that he had no control over the tribes. They assumed that Krishna Maniyka enabled the raid by Lalsuthlaha for the purpose of settling a dispute over territory. Krishna Manikya failed to answer to the British for Lalsuthlaha's crimes as the kingdom of Tripura lacked de-facto control over the Lushai-Kuki tribes. To restore the confidence of the Manipuri villagers and labourers, the British decided on a policy of urgent punishment for the raiders. Upon further investigation, despite being a tributary to the Tripura Kingdom, the British designated the Paite tribes as de-facto independent. This led to a cessation of increased cooperation with Krishna Kishor Manikya.

Both the British and the Tripura kingdom were focused on bringing the raid to justice. Krishna Kishor Manikya offered to open up a channel for negotiation and resort to armed intervention if Lalsuthlaha refused to do so. The British disagreed with the need for armed intervention. Further investigation revealed that several traders from Lalsuthlaha's village would make trips to markets and bazaars in the plains. However, the vendors and villagers would cheat and attack the traders, prompting tensions between Lalsuthlaha and the settlement. The court dismissed the testimony despite Krishna Manikya's efforts to give it weight.

Sealy encouraged a deadline by which Krishna Manikya would intervene with his forces as a punitive expedition. If Lalsuthlaha were not handed over by 1 December 1844, a military expedition would be started. Krishna Manikya voiced his concerns about the heavy rainfall seasons and the feasibility of a successful expedition, which was unsuccessful. The government of Bengal established a military expedition under Captain Blackwood. Lalsuthlaha's own cousin, Lalhmingsanga, even participated in the punitive expedition against him with cooperation from Sealy. Lalhmingsanga provided translators and guides to help Blackwood. Krishna Manikya provided coolies and logistics, such as food, to aid Blackwood's expedition. Krishna Manikya followed British orders but refused deep in the expedition when asked to aid in capturing Lalsuthlaha, preferring instead to capture Bantawia and leaving Blackwood's column to fight on their own.

As Blackwood's expedition travelled into the Lushai Hills, it met no resistance. On December 9 1844, Blackwood reached Lalsuthlaha's village. Lalsuthlaha was unprepared because he had been negotiating with Krishna Manikya and didn't anticipate the British would form a punitive expedition. Lalhmingsanga sent Lalsuthlaha his messengers with an invitation to surrender. Lalsuthlaha accepted on the condition he would surrender in his village at his zawlbûk and not the British encampment. Blackwood held little trust for Lalsuthlaha to receive him in his settlement after no resistance. He subsequently sent messengers urging him to surrender, or his houses and grain storage would be burnt down. Blackwood promised Lalsuthlaha would not be ill-treated. Lalhmingsanga intervened as a messenger and assured Lalsuthlaha that he would not be put to death or kept in captivity. However, Captain Blackwood was not made aware of this assurance. Lalsuthlaha surrendered and brought a minor girl who was the only survivor of the Kachubari raids.

Lalsuthlaha's testimony claimed revenge as his chief motivator for the raid. His father, Chief Lalrihua, had been killed by the two Manipuri princes, Ram Singh and Tribonjit Singh. The two princes were empowered by the British to check Lushai-Kuki incursions and raids. The two princes who wished to overthrow the Manipur king and take the throne overran the territory of Chief Lalrihua out of spite, who refused to help them. Lalrihua had refused requests for manpower and money to aid their campaign in overthrowing the king. In the campaign, Lalrihua was tortured and killed. Deputy Commissioner of Cachar, Edgar in his notes of a tour of the Lushai Hills, suspected that Lalsuthlaha raided on orders of Mângpawrha and was spinning a false narrative to defend him. Lalsuthlaha claimed he did not realise that Kachubari subjects were British subjects. Lalsuthlaha was advised by Blackwood to bring his raiding party and surrender in Sylhet. Lalsuthlaha agreed to come to the British authorities on the condition that his life would be spared. Lalsuthlaha was received in Sylhet on 25 December 1844 with the other raiders involved. Lalsuthlaha was charged under Regulation VIII of 1829.

In court, Lalsuthlaha stated he did not personally participate in the raid of Kachubari but did direct it to avenge the death of his father. Lalsuthlaha was charged with murder and sentenced for life. This led to Lalsuthlaha being deported from his settlement for the remainder of his life. Bantawia was set free in comparison.

== Biography ==
Western Lushai-Palian Chiefs Family Tree

Purburha
Sibuta
Chhungpaliana
Lalkhamliana
Kohzasira	Lalpuiliana
Lallula	Bantawia	Lalrihua	Bontai	Liandova
Vûta	Lallianvunga	Lalpuiliana	Mângpawrha	Pi Buki	Lalsuthlaha	Lalhmingsanga	Lal Hlun
Ruthangpi	Rûnphunga	Thâwmpâwnga	Suakpuilala	Banaitangi	Ngursailova	Dorikhuma
Thanghulha	Vanrûma	Laljachera	Bankhampui
Lalchhûnga (d.) (Note: Lalchunga died early making Khalkam the oldest. His sons were raised by Sukpilal.)	Khalkama	Lianphunga	Sailianpui	Thanrûma	Lalhrima	Lalsavunga	Hrangkhupa	Zahrâwka	Dokhûma	Tulêra	Lalsavûta	Thangvûta
Liankunga

=== Early life ===
Lalsuthlaha was the son of Lalrihua. His early life is not documented until his father's death in 1843 from a Manipuri invasion, which prompted him to inherit chieftainship. He had a sister named Pi Buki who was the mother of the chief Suakpuilala.

=== Marriage and children ===
Lalsuthlaha held concubines and wives. His eldest son was Ngursailova. After Lalsuthlaha was deported to Sylhet and mandated to live in exile in the outhouse of Zamindar Ali Amzad, Ngursailova accompanied him for the first few years.Lalsuthlaha's son would also marry the sister of Suakpuilala, Banaitangi.

=== Death ===
Lalsuthlaha's death is not recorded, but he remained in Sylhet under Ali Amzad for the rest of his life. Regarding notes recorded by Deputy Commissioner Eddgar in his tour of 1871, Lalsuthlaha was reported to be alive and in custody.

== Sources ==
- Chatterjee, Suhas (1985). Mizoram under British Rule. Delhi: Mittal Publications.
- Chatterjee, Suhas (1995). Mizo Chiefs and the Chiefdom. New Delhi: Mittal Publications. ISBN 81-85880-72-7.
- Chaudhuri, Dipak Kumar (1999). The Political Agents and the Native Raj Conflict, Conciliation, and Progress, Tripura Between 1871 to 1890. Delhi: Mittal Publications.
- Guite, Jangkhomang (September 2014). "Colonialism and its Unruly? The Colonial State and Kuki Raids in Nineteenth Century Northeast India". Modern Asian Studies. 48 (5): 1118–1232. doi:10.1017/S0026749X12000674. ProQuest 1550073156.
- Mackenzie, Alexander (1884). History Of The Relations Of The Government With The Hill Tribes Of The North-east Frontier Of Bengal. Calcutta: Home Department Press.<
- Nag, Sajal (2008). Pied Pipers in North-East India: Bamboo-flowers, Rat-famine and the Politics of Philanthropy. (1881-2007). New Delhi: Manohar Publishers & Distributors. ISBN 978-81-7304-311-6.
- Pau, Pum Khan; Mung, Thang Sian (2021). "Fragmented tribes of the India-Burma-Bangladeshborderlands: representation of the Zo (Kuki-Chin)people in colonial ethnography". Asian Ethnicity. 23 (2): 1–22. doi:10.1080/14631369.2021.1885291.
- Woodthorpe, Robert Gosset (1873), The Lushai expedition, 1871-1872, London: Hurst and Blackett
- Varman, S.B.K. Dev (2012). The Tribes of Tripura A Dissertation (PDF) (4 ed.). Tripura: Tribal Research and Cultural Institute Govt. of Tripura.
