= Pi Buki =

Western Mizo chieftainess (d.1877)

- Chieftainess of Muthi; Muthi Lalnu
- Predecessor: Mângpawrha
- Successor: Suakpuilala
- Died: March 1877
- Spouse: Mângpawrha
- Issue: Suakpuilala, Banaitangi
- House: Sailo
- Father: Lalrihua
- Religion: Sakhua

Pi Buki was a Mizo chieftainess in the western Lushai Hills (now Mizoram). She cooperated with the British and was the mother of Suakpuilala. She also challenged customary Mizo laws on women's inheritance by granting her daughters chieftainship rights.

== Chieftainship ==
Pi Buki was born to Chief Lalrihua and was the sister of Lalsuthlaha. She was married to Mângpawrha, who parted with his estate to pay the customary bride price to her and hence entitled her to chieftainship. Pi Buki managed Mângpawrha's estate diligently and allowed him to grow in power and influence. She maintained a conciliatory policy with the British, who she described as white sahibs possessing guns that could destroy villages and granaries. Following Mângpawrha's death, she met with the British officials and formed diplomatic alliances with them while maintaining the sovereignty of her family's chiefdoms.

Pi Buki mended customary Mizo inheritance laws in regards to equal shares for her son and daughters. Traditionally, only the son of the chief could inherit property, and women could not if a legitimate male descendant were alive. Pi Buki granted estates to her daughter Banaitangi and Rothangpuii alongside her son Suakpuilala. Both Banaitangi and Rothangpuii ruled their own independent villages as chieftainesses.

Pibuk was recorded by the British by participating in the trade and riverine bazaars with her grandson Khalkama where she sent ivory tusks in August 1874 to open the Sonai Bazaar.

The Deputy Commissioner, made a tour in February 1877 of Pi Buki's village and recorded 100 houses. She also had a vassal chief known as Sanga who ruled over 200 houses. Her upas accompanied the deputy commissioner along with Sanga as a form of hospitality. Pi Buki died in March 1877, and her ruling settlement was succeeded by her daughter Banaitangi.

== Genealogy ==
Western Lushai-Palian Chiefs Family Tree

Purburha
Sibuta
Chhungpaliana
Lalkhamliana
Kohzasira	Lalpuiliana
Lallula	Bantawia	Lalrihua	Bontai	Liandova
Vûta	Lallianvunga	Lalpuiliana	Mângpawrha	Pi Buki	Lalsuthlaha	Lalhmingsanga	Lal Hlun
Ruthangpi	Rûnphunga	Thâwmpâwnga	Suakpuilala	Banaitangi	Ngursailova	Dorikhuma
Thanghulha	Vanrûma	Laljachera	Bankhampui
Lalchhûnga (d.) (Note: Lalchunga died early making Khalkam the oldest. His sons were raised by Sukpilal.)	Khalkama	Lianphunga	Sailianpui	Thanrûma	Lalhrima	Lalsavunga	Hrangkhupa	Zahrâwka	Dokhûma	Tulêra	Lalsavûta	Thangvûta
Liankunga

== Sources ==
- Nag, Sajal; Lalsangpuii, R. (2024). "Reversing of Gender:Anti-colonial resistance by Women warriors in Northeast India". In Singh, Lata; Sinha, Shashank Shekhar (eds.). Gender in Modern India:History, Culture, Marginality. Oxford University Press.
- Chatterjee, Suhas (1995). Mizo Chiefs and the Chiefdom. New Delhi: Mittal Publications. ISBN 81-85880-72-7.
- Tribal Research Institute (1978). The Lushais 1878-1889. Aizawl: Firma KLM Private Limited.
