= Sibuta =

Early Lushai chief (c. 1765 - c. 1840)

- Chief of Tachhip; Tachhip Lal
- Predecessor: Darpida
- Successor: Chawngawlun
- Born: c. 1765
- Died: c. 1840; Tachhip
- Issue: Chawngpawlun
- House: Palian (disputed)
- Father: Purburha (disputed); Unknown
- Religion: Sakhua

Sibuta (c. 1765-c. 1840) was a Lushai chief. He is known for declaring independence from the sovereignty of Hill Tipperah and his cruelty as a chief.

== Early life ==
Sibuta was the adopted son of a chief. Some accounts argue him to be an illegitimate son of Purburha while another argues him to be a captive of Chief Darpida. The chief recorded as his adoptive father is disputed. Reasons for why he was adopted has varied according to different sources. However, most agree that Sibuta was the brother of the chief's daughter Darlalpuii. Darlalpuii would incessantly bully and torture Sibuta. Resisting lashing out against her, Sibuta warned her that one day if he becomes chief she will regret her treatment of him. Sibuta around the age of eight soon begot a brother under the chief who would claim legitimacy as the next chief. Accounts record that Sibuta learnt how to handle poison and mix it into his father's zu. As for his brother, Sibuta took him to the fields and killed him. He would claim that his brother fell from a tree while trying to get a bird he had killed and had died in an unfortunate accident. Sibuta thus assumed power as chief.

== Chieftainship ==
As chief Sibuta migrated into Hill Tipperah around 1794. Sibuta was married and he removed Darlalpuii and her husband from the chief's house. One time, Sibuta was visited by Lalngura, who was fond of Darlalpuii. Lalngura offered to take Darlalpuii's hand in marriage. However Sibuta simply replied that he had to complete the Khuangchawi ceremony first.

=== Darlalpuii Khuangchawi festival ===
Sibuta, as chief, was due to perform the Khuangchawi ceremony. While this normally was done with a mithun, Sibuta instead used Darlalpuii as the sacrifice. Unlike the killing of his father and brother, Sibuta wished brutality for the death of Darlalpuii. Darlalpuii was bound and marched along with the bulls without rest. Darlalpuii's mother attempted to feed Darlalpuii water but Sibuta stopped her and threw the gourd of water to the ground. The villager's quenched Darlalpuii's thirst in secret. After the march was complete, Sibuta ordered Darlalpuii's clothes to be removed and for her bareskin to be beaten with sticks and cane. Darlalpuii was tied to the seluphan (sacrificial post). In front of his subjects Sibuta killed Darlalpuii with a spiked bamboo spear into her neck. Her head was decapitated and hung up on top of the sacrificial post. The villagers, afraid of Sibuta's cruelty, did not protest him.

Lalngura heard the news and visited Darlalpuii's mother. Lalngura hearing the recounting of the event drew his dao ready to kill Sibuta. However, Darlalpuii's mother stated that the upa would support Sibuta and lead to both of their deaths for any retaliation. Lalngura however was determined to take revenge.

The next day Lalngura took his dao and made his way to Sibuta. However on the way he saw Darlalpuii's head hanging in the courtyard of the chief's gate. This enraged Lalngura. Lalngura asked the upas of Sibuta's whereabouts. Knowing that Sibuta was in danger they stated that Sibuta was at the jhum fields. Lalngura went and searched for Sibuta but could not find him.

Sibuta continued to rule however bad luck began to take on Sibuta. Sibuta began to experience a fear of ramhuai (evil spirits). Seeing this as a bad omen, Sibuta believed he was to die soon. Thus Sibuta decided to build a great monument for his legacy as a chief. A large stone was found which the villagers extracted off Tacchip mountain with knives, axes and iron rods.

The stone was too heavy to be moved by the villagers. Sibuta thus decided to appease the Gods by killing three of his subjects and smearing their blood on the rock. Through sheer effort the rock was moved. Sibuta finally placed a living subject in the pit and placed the rock on top of them. Hence Sibuta's monument the Sibuta Lung cost four lives to establish.

== Genealogy ==
Western Lushai-Palian Chiefs Family Tree

Purburha
Sibuta
Chhungpaliana
Lalkhamliana
Kohzasira	Lalpuiliana
Lallula	Bantawia	Lalrihua	Bontai	Liandova
Vûta	Lallianvunga	Lalpuiliana	Mângpawrha	Pi Buki	Lalsuthlaha	Lalhmingsanga	Lal Hlun
Ruthangpi	Rûnphunga	Thâwmpâwnga	Suakpuilala	Banaitangi	Ngursailova	Dorikhuma
Thanghulha	Vanrûma	Laljachera	Bankhampui
Lalchhûnga (d.) (Note: Lalchunga died early making Khalkam the oldest. His sons were raised by Sukpilal.)	Khalkama	Lianphunga	Sailianpui	Thanrûma	Lalhrima	Lalsavunga	Hrangkhupa	Zahrâwka	Dokhûma	Tulêra	Lalsavûta	Thangvûta
Liankunga

== See also ==
- Lalchukla

== Sources ==
- Zawla, K. (1964). Mizo Pi Pute leh an thlahte Chanchin. Aizawl: Gosen Press.
- Lalthangliana, B. (1989). Mizo Lal Ropuite (in Mizo). Aizawl: R.T.M Press.
- Verghese, C.G.; Thanzawna, R.L. (1997). A History of the Mizos. New Delhi: Vikas Publishing House.
- Hmar, Bonny. "Mizo Lal Nunrawng Sibuta". Times of Mizoram.
