= Suakpuilala =

Chief of the Western Lushai Hills in the 19th century

- Chief of Reiek; Reiek Lal
- Predecessor: Mângpawrha
- Successor: Khalkam
- Died: c. 1880; Tanhril (borough of present-day Aizawl)
- Issue: Khalkam, Lianphunga, and 10 more
- House: Sailo
- Father: Mangpawrha
- Mother: Pi Buki
- Religion: Sakhua

Suakpuilala, known by the British as Sukpilal, was a Lushai chieftain from the Sailo clan who held considerable influence over the western Lushai Hills (present day Mizoram) in the Indo-Burma Ranges. Suakpuilala conducted a series of raids in British tea plantations and entered a diplomatic relationship with the British soon after. He was also a patron of bazaars and riverines established in the Lushai Hills as the first official trade channels. A defender of his sovereignty, Suakpuilala's influence in the Lushai Hills was used by the British for mutual benefit.

== Chieftainship ==
Suakpuilala began to grow his influence by annexing neighbouring chiefdoms. Another chief known as Ngura, who was a sworn enemy of Suakpuilala, died, and his son, Vonpilal, also died, leaving Ngura's widow, Impanee, to become regent to her infant son Lalhai. This weakening allowed Suakpuilala to take over their territories and grow his influence. Impanee broke her alliance with another chief, Vuta, and gave away land to Suakpuilala's son, Khalkam, who successfully defended it from Vuta.

In 1877, Khalkom began cultivating lands claimed by Poiboi, the chief of the Eastern Lushai Hills. This feud would escalate into an east-west war. The eastern chiefs, Liankhama, Lalburha, Chungleng and Bungtey, formed a coalition against the western chiefs of Suakpuilala, Khalkam and Lianphunga. Upon the insistence of the chiefs, the British held a joint summit to meet and discuss peace, but the talks failed. Suakpuilala lost a village to the Pois in 1878. In April 1879, a party under Suakpuilala prepared the villages of Pawibawia, Liankhama and their vassal chief Chungleng. They turned back after encountering a village under Poiboi's grandmother between each other who encouraged them to turn back with friendly overtures.

=== Anglo-Lushai Relations ===
Suakpuilala worked with other chiefs to protect the sovereignty of the Lushai Hills. In October 1950, Suakpuilala, with Botai, Vonolel, Langroo and Lalpoe, held a negotiation with the British to protect them from Poi aggression. They offered tributes to the British and became ryots in order to ease the dread of the advance of the Pois. The British rejected suzerainty as they preferred to have better borders to respect sovereignty. Suakpuilala, in December, arrived at Colonel Lister alone to discuss diplomacy. In a document by Lister, Suakpuilala's statement is recorded. Suakpuilala professes that he is the chief of ten chiefs who acknowledge his authority and that many Lushai chiefs are paying tributes to the Pois who are more powerful than them. The captives from raids are traded to the Pois in return for guns and rifles, such as a 4-foot slave for two muskets. Suakpuilala offered Lister an elephant tusk and received coarse woollen cloth in return. Suakpuilala also apologized for the raids of 1849, stating that the Lushai chiefs weren't aware of which kukis were under British sovereignty. He finally highlighted how the surrender of Lalchukla in good faith led to his exile in 1844 from his village, which had made other chiefs less cooperative and trusting of the British. Suakpuilala left with a promise to return any British subjects in his possession as captives and to release them in good faith. Lister subsequently commented on Suakpuilala's initiatives as sincere.

In 1855, Suakpuilala requested assistance from the British against chiefs who had attacked him. Since he had sent elephant tusks as presents to Cachar, he argued his status as a tributary granted him the right to British protection. In response, the British reiterated their non-intervention policy regarding tribal affairs beyond their jurisdiction. In 1863, witnesses who escaped captivity described the raid of Sylhet as being led by four chiefs, including Suakpuilala. The British authorities convinced Suakpuilala to give up his captives, to restrain his raiding parties from entering British territory, and to not cooperate with chiefs that did so. Suakpuilala was given an annual money payment, and presents were given by Suakpuilala as an acknowledgement of allegiance. The following year, in 1864, Captain Stewart offered Suakpuilala aid in rice to offset the mautam famine. Suakpuilala sent his half-brother and his upa to negotiate with Stewart, to which they apologized for the Adampore raid. Stewart offered Suakpuilala a 50 rupee stipend monthly on the condition that he meet with him, bring his captives, and swear friendship. However, Suakpuilala was too ill to move and sent his son, who agreed to all the other terms.

Suakpuilala participated in raids of British territory and subjects. These actions led to the British contemplating a punitive expedition against Suakpuilala. The failure of Suakpuilala to release the captives from the raid of Adampur led to this decision. Stewart prepared a police column and planned to locate Suakpuilala's stronghold and village until a message from Suakpuilala sent a tribute to Stewart. Suakpuilala originally demanded compensation for the loss of three of his men during the attacks until he decided to act diplomatically on account of hearing of the police force being assembled. This led to Suakpuilala promising to become a peaceful neighbour to the British. Suakpuilala eventually release four captive boys. Chief Murchuilal, Sukpuilal's brother-in-law, opposed releasing any more captives to the British. This was due to their close alliance and Suakpuilala's dependence on Murchuilal to procure muskets. Another reason was that the captives were married off to Lushai subjects and, hence, unwilling to return as well.

In November 1868, reports surfaced that Suakpuilala had raided villages in Hill Tipperah and caused a chief named Rungbhoom to take refuge in Sylhet. A punitive expedition was arranged. Colonel Nuthall commanded the column responsible for capturing Sukpuilal. However, bad weather and poor logistics prevented the column and subsidiary detachments from returning with results. Sir W. Grey advocated for a show of power and military response and establishing a political officer in the Lushai Hills to prevent more hostilities. However, the government of India rejected this. Due to this, Suakpuilala's raid went unpunished.

Under the British policy of conciliation with the Lushai chiefs, the deputy commissioner of Cachar, John Edgar, met with Suakpuilala to establish better borders. This followed several raids leading up to 1969, which prompted a need to demarcate the sovereignty of chiefdoms and British territory. The government of India approached the negotiations in good faith as they wished to avoid further collisions. Due to this, past offences and reparations were not mentioned. Edgar met with Suakpuilala on 21 February 1870 to demarcate a boundary from Tipaimukh to Chatachura, which Suakpuilala agreed to on behalf of himself and the western chiefs to respect for one year. Suakpuilala entered another agreement on another diplomatic envoy of Edgar, represented the Western chiefs, and stated he had no authority over the eastern chiefs. During the agreements and negotiations for this second agreement, the raid of Alexandrapore saw the kidnapping of Mary Winchester (Zoluti) and the change in policy with the Lushai Expedition.

Suakpuilala also formed a coalition with his son and Lengpunga regarding the outbreak of the Second East-West War. Suakpuilala contacted British authorities, such as the deputy commissioner of Cachar, for help against the Eastern chiefs but was refused. Suakpuilala continued to advocate for peace channels with the British through his upas. Towards the 1880s, Suakpuilala's health began to decline. By the onset of the mautam famine, Suakpuilala died. His son Khalkam largely assumed his role as chief of the Western Lushai Hills.

== Biography ==
Western Lushai-Palian Chiefs Family Tree

Purburha
Sibuta
Chhungpaliana
Lalkhamliana
Kohzasira	Lalpuiliana
Lallula	Bantawia	Lalrihua	Bontai	Liandova
Vûta	Lallianvunga	Lalpuiliana	Mângpawrha	Pi Buki	Lalsuthlaha	Lalhmingsanga	Lal Hlun
Ruthangpi	Rûnphunga	Thâwmpâwnga	Suakpuilala	Banaitangi	Ngursailova	Dorikhuma
Thanghulha	Vanrûma	Laljachera	Bankhampui
Lalchhûnga (d.) (Note: Lalchunga died early making Khalkam the oldest. His sons were raised by Sukpilal.)	Khalkama	Lianphunga	Sailianpui	Thanrûma	Lalhrima	Lalsavunga	Hrangkhupa	Zahrâwka	Dokhûma	Tulêra	Lalsavûta	Thangvûta
Liankunga

=== Early life ===
Suakpuilala was the eldest son of Mângpawrha and Pi Buki and grandson of Lallula. His two brothers were Thangbhoonga and Runpunga. His two brothers did not possess his prestige and were subject to be subordinate to him in governance. His eldest sister was Routhangi, who lived among him as she married the upas (ministers) of her father, Mungpira. His second sister was chieftess Banaithangi, who married Murchuilal. To arrange for Banaitangi's wedding and bride price, Suakpuilala raided Adampore and brought six captives to work for her sister in her household as bawis.

Legend and oral history record Suakpuilala in his youth as having immense physical strength and skilled in lancing. At a tribal fair in Unokoti, Tripura, Suakpuilala was the champion of a javelin throwing competition. His prowess and feats were widespread among the Mizo chiefdoms and a household name in zawlbuks across the Lushai Hills.

=== Marriage and children ===
Suakpuilala married Muichuilal's sister, who had married his sister Banaitangi. He had two other principal wives apart from her. Suakpuilala also held many concubines and slave girls. As a result, Suakpuilala had many children and grandchildren. His sons were Lalchhunga, Khalkam, Lengpunga, Sailenpui and Thanruma. His daughters by his principal wives were not recorded. To his illegitimate children outside of his three legal wives, Suakpuilala did grant villages to a few of them.

=== Death ===
Suakpuilala's health began to degrade towards the late 1870s. He sent for help for the deputy commissioner of Cachar in his ailment. Major M.O Boyd did send a qualified doctor, but the lack of infrastructure and ease of travel in the Lushai Hills made it difficult and, hence, failed to save his life. His death saw a succession war over his descendants that created anarchy in the Lushai Hills. It also occurred during a time of mautam famine. Relations with the British and Suakpuilala's tribe were affected as Suakpuilala's descendants extorted bazaars and markets in Lushai territory.

== See also ==
- Mizo Chieftainship
- Mizo people
- Ropuiliani

== Sources ==
- Chatterjee, Suhas (1995). Mizo Chiefs and the Chiefdom. New Delhi: Mittal Publications. ISBN 81-85880-72-7.
- Elly, E.B. (1978) [1893]. Military Report on The Chin-Lushai Country. Calcutta: Firma KLM Private Limited.
- Guite, Jangkhomang (September 2014). "Colonialism and its Unruly? The Colonial State and Kuki Raids in Nineteenth Century Northeast India". Modern Asian Studies. 48 (5): 1118–1232. doi:10.1017/S0026749X12000674. ProQuest 1550073156.
- Mackenzie, Alexander (1884). History of the Relations of the government with the Hill Tribes of the North-East Frontier of Bengal. Calcutta: Home Department Press.
- Nag, Sajal (2008). Pied Pipers in North-East India: Bamboo-flowers, Rat-famine and the Politics of Philanthropy. (1881-2007). New Delhi: Manohar Publishers & Distributors. ISBN 978-81-7304-311-6.
- Zou, S. Thangboi (2019). "Riverine bazaars, trade and chiefs in the colonial Lushai Hills". Asian Ethnicity. 22 (4): 563–582. doi:10.1080/14631369.2019.1687284.
