= Mângpawrha =

Western Mizo chief

- Chief of Reiek; Reiek Lal
- Predecessor: Lallula
- Successor: Suakpuilala
- Born: c. 1770; Lungchhuan
- Died: Reiek
- Spouse: Pi Buki
- House: Sailo
- Father: Lalphunga
- Religion: Sakhua

Mângpawrha was a Mizo chief of the Western Lushai Hills (now Mizoram). Mângpawrha was the son of Chief Lallula and consolidated Sailo rule in the Lushai Hills.

== Early life ==
Mângpawrha was born to Lallula as the third son during Lallula's stay at Lungchhuan. His youngest brother Vûta was born in 1776 hence making Mângpawrha precede the date. Lallula continued to migrate and found new settlements and jhum locations until Lallula became old and settled in Hreichuk. During this time, Mângpawrha separated from Lallula and ruled his own village of Bedo.

== Chieftainship ==
His brother Lallianvunga was assigned the Eastern Lushai Hills and Mângpawrha was granted the right to expand westwards. However, western expansion required the confrontation of Palian and Zadêng chiefs.

=== Mângpawrha's capture ===
During this time period, the chief Palian opponent towards Mângpawrha's expansion was Lalrihua (father of Lalsuthlaha), who clashed and went to war with Mângpawrha for cultivable land. After the British annexed Kachari Kingdom in 1830 they began to invest in policies to curb Lushai raids in the new territories. Two Meitei villages were placed under authority of the Manipur's King's relatives Ram Singh and Tribumjit Singh. The British government provided guns and ammunitions to these frontier settlements. Lalrihua, the Palian chief coordinated with these frontier villages to attack Mângpawrha. The surprise attack succeeded and Mângpawrha was captured and taken as Lalrihua's captive. During captivity, Mângpawrha was coerced into making a promise to not conduct any raids on British territory. Mângpawrha was later freed after his villagers ransomed him.

=== Palian conflict ===
Mângpawrha began to scheme for revenge against Lalrihua. The opportunity came when the two frontier villages rebelled against the British to try and take the Manipur throne for Ram Singh and Tribumjit. Taking opportunity of the weakness of Lalrihua's lack of allies, Mângpawrha attacked Lalrihua. Lalrihua was unable to defend against Mângpawrha and was chased out to the northern part of the Hachhek range. After the defeat, Mângpawrha settled further west and founded Pakwachherre on the River Langkaih.

=== Zadêng confrontation ===
Mângpawrha migrated from the Hachhek range to Rulphuihlim. However, the Zadeng west of him did not allow him to gain full control of the Hachhek and Reiek ranges. Mângpawrha would often demoralise the Zadêng chiefs by composing hla (transl. song) about them. Mângpawrha used this to attract more settlers to his villages. He would sing the hla while holding a gun and shooting in the direction of enemy settlements. The Zadêngs had historically allied with the Palian chiefs to drive out the Hualngo. However, they turned on the Palian chiefs and destroyed them in 1830. The Zadêng chiefs operated on the belief that the King of Manipur would come to their aid if they were invaded. When Mângpawrha attacked the Zadêng, no help was given to them. The Zadêng became increasingly routed, and the last independent Zadêng chief died in 1857 at Chengpui. This consolidated uncontested Sailo rule in the Lushai Hills.

== Later life ==
Mângpawrha had three sons with his wife Pi Buki: Suakpuilala, Rûnphunga and Thâwmpâwnga. He also had two daughters namely, Routhangi and Banaitangi. Mângpawrha was seen as a benevolent leader who used force to achieve his goals during wartime but was endeared by his subjects. Mângpawrha died in Reiek.

== Genealogy ==
Western Lushai-Palian Chiefs Family Tree

Purburha
Sibuta
Chhungpaliana
Lalkhamliana
Kohzasira	Lalpuiliana
Lallula	Bantawia	Lalrihua	Bontai	Liandova
Vûta	Lallianvunga	Lalpuiliana	Mângpawrha	Pi Buki	Lalsuthlaha	Lalhmingsanga	Lal Hlun
Ruthangpi	Rûnphunga	Thâwmpâwnga	Suakpuilala	Banaitangi	Ngursailova	Dorikhuma
Thanghulha	Vanrûma	Laljachera	Bankhampui
Lalchhûnga (d.) (Note: Lalchunga died early making Khalkam the oldest. His sons were raised by Sukpilal.)	Khalkama	Lianphunga	Sailianpui	Thanrûma	Lalhrima	Lalsavunga	Hrangkhupa	Zahrâwka	Dokhûma	Tulêra	Lalsavûta	Thangvûta
Liankunga

== Sources ==
- Chatterjee, Subhas (1995). Mizo Chiefs and the Chiefdom. New Delhi: M D Publications PVT LTD. ISBN 81-85880-72-7.
- Hmar, Lalrinnunga (2010). "Mangpawrha's contribution in Mizo History" (PDF). Historical Journal of Mizoram. XI (1).
