= Sajal Nag =

Sajal Nag is Netaji Subhash Chandra Bose Distinguished Chair Professor in Social Sciences at Presidency University, Kolkata. He specialises in the history of modern North-East India. He has published extensively on different aspects of India's North-East

He was a professor of history at Assam University, Silchar. Earlier, and was associated with the North Eastern Hill University, Shillong, and the Centre for Social Studies, Surat.

In 2008 Prof. Sajal Nag was Charles Wallace Fellow at the Centre of South Asian Studies, University of Cambridge (UK). He was a Commonwealth Fellow to United Kingdom during 2004–2005 and a visiting senior research fellow at Queen's University, Belfast. He was senior fellow at Nehru Memorial Museum and Library, New Delhi for two years 2013–2014.

With several published books and research articles, his book India and North East India: Mind, Politics and the Process of Integration 1946-1950 (Regency, Delhi, 1998) was nominated for Srikant Dutt Memorial Award for the Best Book on North East India in 2002 and, more recently, the book Contesting Marginality: Ethnicity, Insurgency and Sub nationalism in North East India (Manohar, New Delhi, 2002) was short listed for the New India Foundation Awards for the Best Book in Non-Fiction Category. He is also the member of the Govt. of India's NCERT Curriculum Revision Committee in Contemporary Indian Politics. He has been the Oxfam Consultant for North East Indian Affairs and a part of its India Disaster Report and Violence Mitigation and Amelioration Project and a contributor to its India Disaster Report. Currently, he is an executive member of the International South Asian Environmental Historians. and Indian History Congress.

== Publications ==
=== Books ===
- Roots of Ethnic Conflict: Nationality Question in North East India, Manohar, New Delhi, 1990. ISBN 8185054932
- India and North East India: Mind, Politics and the Process of Integration 1946–1950, Regency, New Delhi, 1998. ISBN 818603076X
- Nationalism, Separatism and Secessionism, Rawat, New Delhi, 1999. ISBN 81-7033-496-9
- Contesting Marginality: Ethnicity, Insurgency and Sub nationalism in North East India, Manohar, New Delhi, 2002. ISBN 8173044279
- Pied Pipers in North East India: Bamboo Flowers, Rat Famine and the Politics of Environment in North East India, Manohar, New Delhi, 2008. ISBN 8173043116
- The Uprising: Colonial State, Christian Missionary and Anti-Slavery Movement in North East India 1908–1954. Oxford University Press, Delhi, 2016
- Bridging State and Nation: Politics of Peace in Nagaland and Mizoram, with Rita Manchanda and Tapan Bose, Sage, 2015, ISBN 978-93-515-0098-8 (HB)
- The Beleaguered Nation: Ethnicity, Conflict and Nationality Question in Assam, Manohar, Delhi 2016

=== Edited ===
- Making of the Union: Merger of Princely States and Excluded Areas with India, New Delhi, Akansha, 2007 ISBN 9788183701105
- Bridging Region and Nation: Essays in Honour of Prof Amalendu Guha: Professor Amalendu Guha Commemoration Volume, Primus, Delhi, 2016
- Playing With Nature: Essays on Environmental History and Politics with special Reference to North East India, 2 vols. Manohar, Delhi, 2016
