= Lallula =

Early Lushai chief (1729–1807)

- Sailo; Chief of Zopui; Zopui Lal
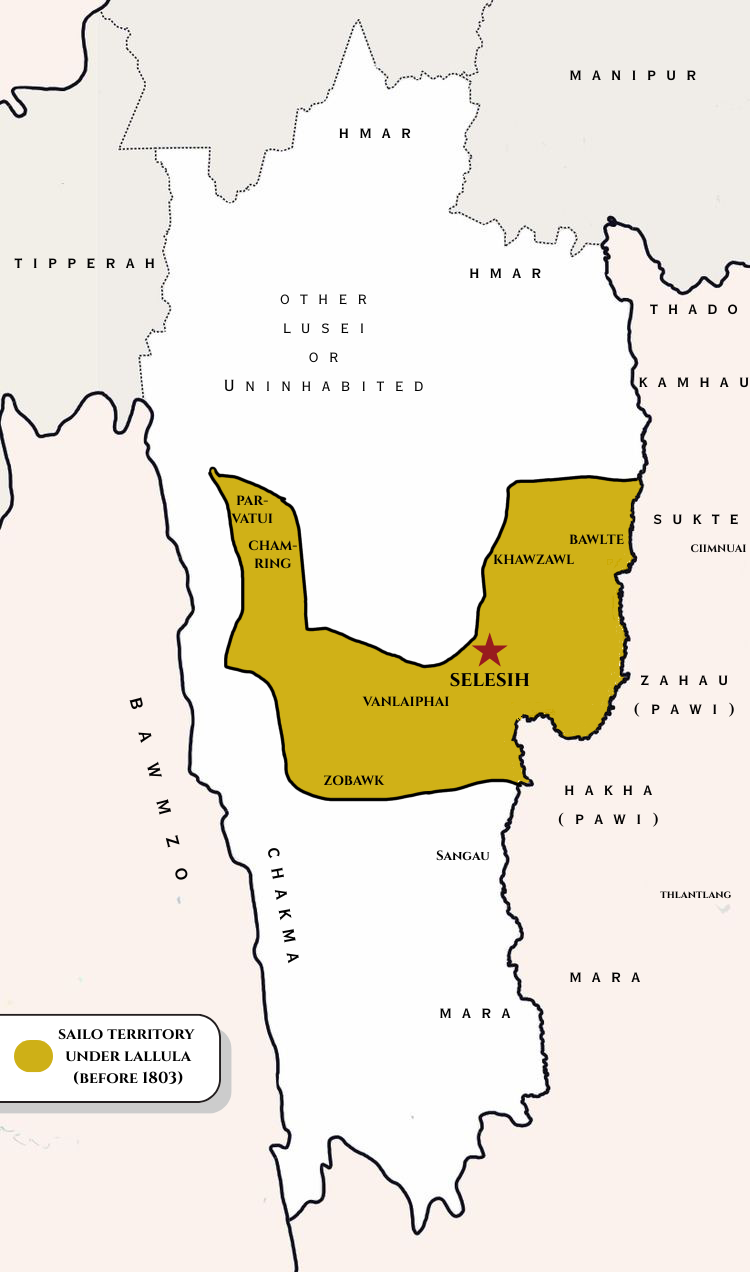
- Predecessor: Rohnaa
- Born: 1729
- Died: 1807 (aged 77–78); Zopui
- Burial: Lungphunkhua
- Issue: Mângpawrha; Lalianvunga; Lalpuiliana; Vuta
- House: Sailo
- Father: Rohnaa
- Religion: Sakhua

Lallula (English: Lalul, c. 1730 - c. 1805) was a Sailo chief who migrated from the Chin Hills in modern day Myanmar into the Lushai Hills of current day Mizoram. He resided in the settlement of Selesih which functioned as a confederation of chiefs to guard against Poi aggression. He would go on to found Zopui and expand Sailo rule in the Lushai Hills. Lallula would be known for his descendants who would culminate in Sailo's domination of the Lushai Hills.

== Early life ==
Lallula was born in the settlement of Selesih to Rohnaa, who was the grandson of Sailova. He had an adopted brother known as Rorehlova. As a young boy, Lallula took the initiative to arrange for the men from the zawlbuk to organize and respond to a village fire. He proved his leadership by getting the men to extinguish the fire. Pu Kawlha, the most influential chief in Selesih, recognised Lallula's leadership skills to organize the zawlbuk better than himself.

One time, Lallula's father, Rohnâa was performing the khuangchawi feast. When the villagers requests Lallula for water, Lallula gave the entire container (tuithawl by throwing it out through the window and breaking it into pieces. He was then asked to give a pot (bel) which he broke in the same way. Rohnâa observed Lallula's conduct and was convinced by the character of Lallula that he would become a great chief.

Eventually Lallula moved to Dungtlang with his father Rohnaa. After Rohnaa's death, Lallula would migrate and establish Zopui as a chief in his own right. He was allotted the land by Pu Kawlha which started off with 500 households.

== Chieftainship ==
Lallula wanted to grow his settlement of Zopui. After the village of Siakeng were raided by the Pawi, a party of Ralte arrived in Zopui and suggested to Lallula that they may join his settlement along with the families left behind. In 1754, he approached the village of Siakeng under Chief Mangngula, known as a brave Pasalṭha. Lallula offered Mangngula a chance to surrender and let his people come to Zopui. Upon refusal, Lallula fought with Mangngula. He overpowered Siakeng and ordered Mangngula to be alive. All individuals of Siakeng who refused to go to Zopui would be killed. However, as Mangngula was a Pasalṭha, he refused to surrender and died in battle instead of becoming a bawi. Lallula took the inhabitants captive and confiscated their property back to Zopui. The Khawlrings who used to reside in Vangchhia began a dispute with the Halkha village under the Pawi. As a result, Halkha sent Chief Maung Myata with 200 men armed with guns. As the Khawlrings did not have guns, they fled to the Lusei communities, such as Zopui under Lallula around 1756. Zopui became the biggest settlement since Selesih had been dissolved.

=== Thalnrawn Massacre ===
Lallula left the settlement of Selesih and established himself in a village he founded named Zopui. Lallula would raid neighbouring villages and chiefs and bring back captives to expand Zopui as a settlement. For this reason Lallula propelled the growth of Zopui. By 1760 Zopui was considered a large populated village. This became a cultural feature via Chai songs describing size and power of Lallula ruling Zopui.

East of the river Tiau resided a tribe known as the Thlanrawn. The Thlanrawn tribes were known for long hair tied in a knot at the top of their heads. They would regularly demand tribute and collect taxes from Zopui and other neighbouring settlements. If tributes were refused or not adequate, then the Thlanrawns would intimidate the villagers by slashing and killing the villagers with knives and swords.

Mizo:

I lal lua e, Phunthanga
Khawtinah chhiah lawr e,
Sat mai zel e aw.
English:

Phunthanga, you are too tyrannical, you collect tributes in every village; and chopping follows promptly

— Historical Journal of Mizoram, Vol IX

A brave warrior in Lallula's village known as Kawlkawlha suggested to Lallula to put an end to this. Lallula was determined to end the Thlangrawns maltreatment of the Luseis. Lallula called a meeting and formed a plan to massacre the Thlanrawns. Lallula invited the Thlanrawn chief Thanchhuma to take elephant tusks, gongs, brass and other things to give him. He also invited Thanchhuma's upas and champion. One of the upas was Phunthanga who held a cruel reputation. Another was a pasaltha known as Thanghlianga.

The dawn of their arrival the villagers pretended to carry ivory by using the cores and husks of bana trees on their heads to carry. Animals and livestock such as mithun were killed and a feast was prepared for Thanchhuma. Thanchhuma and his delegates were fed zu to the point of intoxication under the guise of hospitality. At midnight the plan was carried out by Lallula and the Zopui inhabitants and Pasalṭha. Lallula beat a gong which was the signal to ambush Thanchhuma and his delegates. The rifles of the Thlawnrawn were filled with water. The intoxicated inebriated guests were killed with the swords and weapons of the Luseis. However in the panic and struggle a few managed to escape. Kawlkawlha approached Thanglianga and threatened to kill him. Thanghlianga, who wasn't drunk, got up to fight, but his rifle was filled with water and unable to be shot. Kawlkawlha arrested Thanghlianga. However, he managed to slip his chain off and escape with a few others. Thanchhuma and Phunthanga were made captive and ridiculed and roughly treated. Lallula composed a victory hla of his victory to immortalize the event. However the event was motivation for Lallula to migrate west as the Thlanrawn were scheming to take revenge.

=== Later developments ===
Rorehlova who remained with Lallula throughout his chieftainship was made to separate. Lallula assigned Rorehlova to the east of Zopui as a buffer against the Pawis, as Rorehlova was a Fanai. Their last meeting saw them profess that they will meet in mitthi khua (land of the dead). Rorehlova informed Lallula that if his village was seen burning it would indicate that the Pawis would be targeting Lallula. However this never occurred and Lallula's settlements were safe.

Lallula travelled further west and reached Diakhai near Sialsuk. His youngest son Vuttaia was born around circa 1776 during the stay. During a scout for a new village land to establish the scouts were bitten by a tiger. From Diakhai Lallula moved to Samlukhai. Lallula's son Lalpuilena died in Bawkthlanga. Lalpuiliana was ill since a young age and Lallula had predicted an early death for him. To secure his legacy, Lalpuiliana was married off at an early age. His wife was a Pawi girl, Khuangtuali, who was known for her prowess. Their union led to the birth of Lalsavunga before Lalpuiliana's death.

In c. 1784, Lallula's cousin Laltuaka was chief of Sabualah, hosting 500 houses. Lallula was planning to migrate across the Parvatui mountains to the west, but Laltuaka disagreed. Laltuaka offered that other chiefs were here with him. Lallula initially refused as Laltuaka's village was not big and strong. However Laltuaka offered to divide up the settlement to the chiefs and their peoples and stand together against the Pawi aggression. Lallula agreed to the premise and joined Laltuaka. During his stay in Sabuala, Lallula's daughter Ridawpi died in her settlement of Serchhip.

The settlement grew with 10 chiefs in command. The chiefs belonged to either Laltuaka's family, Rolura's family or Lallula's family. They are as follows:

1. Laltuaka, Chief of Bawlte
2. Lalchungnunga, son of Laltuaka, Chief of Rallen
3. Chawngchhunga, son of Laltuaka, Chief of Bawngthah
4. Savunga, descendent of Rolura, Chief of Dengsur (Hmaker)
5. Rungnawia, descendent of Rolura, Chief of Kawlhawk
6. Hmawngphunga, descendent of Rolura, Chief of Chhipphi
7. Tlutpawrha, descendent of Rolura, Chief of Chemtum
8. Lallianvunga, son of Lallula, Chief of Sawnngek
9. Lalsavunga, grandson of Lallula, Chief of Zawngtah

With many chiefs in the settlement, Lallula proposed a raid on the pawi in c. 1792. However, Laltuaka refused, and the raid was unsuccessful. As a result, Laltuaka was labelled a fool by the other chiefs. Despite being unsuccessful, Lallula remained a famous chief. Lallula migrated back up north and resided in Darlung. He composed songs with one known as Darlung zai and gained a reputation as a musician and poet. After Darlung, Lallula established himself at Kanghmun to fight the Zadeng chiefs. Lallula's rule was expanded as the number of Zadeng chiefs decreased. Lallula proceeded to Hreichuk. His son Lalmanga was separated from him as he consolidated his rule in the western Lushai hills.

=== Marriage and family ===
Lallula would become the progenitor of the modern Sailo chiefs. His son Mângpawrha (Lalmanga) would establish himself as chief of the Western Lushai Hills, which his grandson Sukpilal would inherit. Lalpuilena and Vuta and their descendants would become the Eastern Lushai chiefs. The spreading of Sailo chiefs would standardize the Lusei dialect of Duhlien throughout the Lushai Hills and minor tribes.

Lallulla also had a daughter named Ridawpi, who was married to Lianzatluta, the son of Rolura.

=== Death ===
In old age, Lallula was given tributes from Zopuia and the Thlanrawn villages consisting of pigs and zu. Lallula died in 1807 followed by his wife in 1808. A large stone monument was erected for Lallula. The village was named Lungphunkhua after the memorial stone. He is considered the father of the Sailos. Lallula Zai is the term applied to all the songs and folk tales composed by Lallula.

== Genealogy ==
Early Lushai Chiefs Family Tree

Zahmuaka
Zadeng | Rivunga | Ṭhangura | Paliana | Rokhuma | Thangluaha
Thangmanga | Chawnglula
Chênkuala | Sailova
Chungnunga | Lianlula
Lalhlûma | Rohnâa | Lalchêra | Pu Kawlha | Dârliankuala | Dârpuiliana
Laltuaka | Lallula | Rolûra | Savunga
Lalpuiliana | Lallianvunga | Mângpawrha | Vûta | Lalngûra | Lalzika | Lalbuta
Lalsavunga | Ngûra | Suakpuilala
Vanhnuailiana | Vanpuilala

== Sources ==
- Chatterjee, Suhas (1995). Mizo Chiefs and the Chiefdom. New Delhi: Mittal Publications. ISBN 81-85880-72-7.
- Chatterjee, Suhas (2009). Frontier Officers in Colonial Northeast India. New Delhi: Akansha Publishing. ISBN 978-81-8370-168-6.
- Malsawmliana (2008). "A study of the Thangur Chiefs: With special reference to Lallula". Historical Journal of Mizoram. 9 (1).
- Khiangte, laltluangliana (2006). "The Discourse in Oral Society of the Mizos". In Muthukumaraswamy, M.D. (ed.). Folklore as discourse. Chennai: National Folklore Support Centre. ISBN 978-81-901481-6-0.
- Nunthara, C. (1996). Mizoram: Society and Polity. New Delhi: Indus Publishing Company. ISBN 81-7387-059-4.
- Lalthangliana, B. (2006). Culture and Folklore of Mizoram. Aizawl: Publications Division Ministry of Information and Broadcasting. ISBN 978-81-230-2658-9.
- Lalthangliana, B. (1989). Mizo Lal Ropuite (in Mizo). Aizawl: R.T.M Press.
- Vanlawm, R. (1989) [1965]. Ka Ram Leh Kei (My Country and I). Aizawl: Zalen Publishing House.
- Zawla, K (1964). Mizo Pi Pute Leh An Thlahte Chanchin. Aizawl: Gosen Press.
- Zokima, Reverend (1993). Mizo Lal ber Kairuma Sailo (in Mizo). Aizawl: V.L.B Press.
- Verghese, C.G.; Thanzawna, R.L. (1997). A History of the Mizos. New Delhi: Vikas Publishing House.
