= Vûta =

Chief of the Eastern Lushai Hills (c. 1800 - 1876)

Vûta Sailo
- Chief of Buanhmun; Buanhmun Lal
- Predecessor: Lallula
- Successor: Kairuma
- Born: Lalthangvuta c. 1800; Diarkhaia
- Died: c. 1876; Ruallam
- Burial: 5 May 1920; Sialhawk
- Spouse: Neipuithangi
- Issue: Langsuma; Sangluna; Lalvunga; Lungliana; Kairuma; Lalnguava
- House: Sailo
- Father: Lallula
- Religion: Sakhua

Vuttaia (c. 1800 - 1876) also known as Vûta was an eastern Lushai chief. He was born as Lalthangvuta before Vuttaia became his nickname. He was a founder of the eastern Lushai chiefs and responsible for starting the North and South war of the Lushai Hills.

== Early life ==
Vûta was the youngest son of Chief Lallula. He was born in the village of Diarkhaia. Vûta's birth date is difficult to determine, but c. 1800 is considered the most acceptable range based on his son Kairûma, who was born in 1852. After Lallula's death, Vûta left with his mother to Arte, where he would rule Hreichuk and Arte as a chief. He would be 20 years old when he first became chief.

== Vûta's capture ==
During the Lusei-Hualngo War under Vûta's brothers such as Lalsavunga, the war escalated into alliances. As the Pawi entered the conflict, Vûta was captured by the Pawi and Hualngo. He was transported and placed in the village of Rallang. Rallang village was located north of Lentlang. Zahuata's son Rodenga was assigned to supervise Vûta. Vûta and Rodenga would share songs and poetry during captivity. Vûta would get to know the Pawi and form a relationship with them. As a result, Vûta would become a tributary to the Pawi, with his son Kairûma continuing the practice until annexation by the British. Vûta's brothers raised money for his release. Rorehlova, the oathbound brother of his father Lallula was given the money. This was because he was a Fanâi chief. However, Rorehlova used the money to pay his own debts and tributes. As a result, the money was reduced when offered to the Pawis for Vûta's release. The Zahau chiefs refused the money. As a result, the money and goods were raised once more. Laltuaka's son Chawngchhunga, who was considered a selfish man, refused to give his wealth to Rorehlova to pay off the Pawis for Vuta's release. Vûta would be released two years after his capture, before the Pawi let him go. Upon release and hearing of Chawngchhunga's attitude, relations soured between Laltuaka and Lallula's family.

== Chieftainship ==
In the northwest was a Rivung chief, Vanhnuaithanga, who had died in 1850. He was succeeded by his young inexperienced son Tiamlova. Vûta raided Tiamlova's mother and captured lots of cattle and valuable goods. However, on the way back, the war party was stopped by Chawngchhunga's men, who demanded the bulls they had captured from Tiamlova. When Vûta heard of this from the men he became angry. Vûta went to his brother Mângpawrha (Lalmanga). War erupted between Chawngchhunga and Vûta. Chawngchhunga's villages were weak and could not even occupy the villages ofVûta. Chawngchhunga was captured by Vûta. Vûta further occupied Thingsaiah and Khawriah.

Vûta would move to Arthlawr in Phulpui from Arte. From Arthlawr, he moved to Khumtung before settling in Hualtu. he built a large house at the time as a sign of his prestige.

=== War of North and South ===
Rolura was the cousin of Vûta's father, Lallula. Rolura's grandson Lalpuithanga began to expand westwards. Despite being family, the importance of land led to tensions. Lalpuithanga was the bravest and most powerful chief from Rolura's family. Lalpuithanga prided himself on being able to stop the northern Sailo chiefs while his brothers could not. Vûta was trying to establish the village of Buanhmun to move from Hualtu. Before he could return to Buanhmun, Lalpuithanga occupied it. In anger, Vûta led his men towards Buanhmun. Lalpuithanga, hearing this, retreated from Buanhmun and went back to Vanchengte. Vûta then composed a mocking song about Lalpuithanga's retreat from Buanhmun. The song reached Lalpuithanga, which further raised tensions between the northern and southern Sailos.

Vûta then went to retrieve a gun that Lalpuithanga had in his possession. He took his nephew Thâwmvunga, who was the son of Lalpuiliana and known as a brave pasaltha. Lalpuithanga, in fact, concealed a plan to beat and humiliate Vûta. In the chief's house, Lalpuithanga confronted Vûta about the mocking song made about him. Vûta became afraid of the confrontation as a guest and claimed to mean something different from the song. Thâwmvunga became angry at Vûta's fear and began to swing his sword and dance in a threatening manner with it to subdue the Lalpuithanga and his upas. The upas were unable to beat Vûta and instead made excuses to go home. Thâwngvunga took the gun from the wall and left the chief's house unceremoniously. The Zadêng upas followed him and caught him and tried to stop the gun from being taken. Thâwmgvunga struggled with the upas until he sawed off the rifle and began to run with Vûta and the gun. However, a volley was shot at them as they departed, which was a signal of declaring war.

This began the war between the North and South. The north saw Vûta, Vanhnuailiana and Thâwmvunga, with help from Mângpawrha and Suakpuilala, fought Lalpuithanga's family. Vûta and Vanhnuailiana attacked Vanchengte under Lalpuithanga. After heavy fighting, the northern Lushais beat Lalpuithanga. After the occupation, Vûta and Vanhnuailiana recalled their men, but Vanhnuailiana's men in the rear were shot dead as a result. Despite this, Lalpuithanga's daughter Zathawma invaded Hmuntha in the north. However, their attack failed due to prior knowledge of their movements. Zathawma was wounded in the nose before retreating.

The war saw the northern pasaltha Nghatebaka and the southern champion Chawngbawla also participate in the fight. Vûta sent his allies, the Pawi and Fanâi, to invade the village of Khawlung under chief Thuama. Thuama was the brother of Lalpuithanga. Vûta utilised his relations with the Fanâi and acquired the help of Khawtindala. He also enlisted the Halka Pawi (Haka Chin). Vûta's sons Lalvunga and Lalnguava (Lalkuma) were sent to carry out the invasion. Vûta informed them before departure that if they didn't kill the enemy, they shouldn't come back to him. Khawnglung was a fortified village accessible via a rope bridge. When the rope bridge was left without being detached, the soldiers snuck into the village. They entered the zawlbuk and killed all the men asleep or who tried to get up in the chaos. The fighting men were eradicated, and Thuama's wife and his son Lalhleia were made captives. The Sailos, including Vûta, weren't happy with the capture; however, Vûta became responsible for Lalhleia while Thuama's wife was taken by the Pawi. The event was considered one of the most violent massacres of the time. Vûta attempted to stop the Pawis from taking the captives by forbidding them to cross Lentlang. However, the Pawi simply stated that they were taking whoever they possessed. Most were turned into bawis, with some killed. The event was immortalised in a song.

== Later life ==
After the north-south war, Vûta temporarily intervened and mediated the conflict between the Fanai and Zahau. He moved his village from Buanhmun to Rullam. In 1876, Vûta would die in Rullam, and his skull would be buried in Sialhawk.

== Genealogy ==
Eastern Lushai Chiefs Family Tree

Lallula
Mângpawrha	Lallianvunga	Lalpuiliana	Vûta	Neipuithangi
Suakpuilala	Ngûra	Lalphunga	Thâwmvunga	Lalsavunga
Vanpuilala	Pâwibâwia	Lalruma	Chenglena	Vanhnuailiana	Laltheri
Lalhleia	Doțhiauva	Liankhama	Ropuiliani	Lalburha	Buangtheuva
Thangkâma	Vanphunga	Lalruaia	Lalthuama
Langthanglula	Sanglura	Lalvunga	Lungliana	Kairûma	Lalkhûma

== Sources ==
- Zokima, Reverend (1993). Mizo Lal ber Kairuma Sailo (in Mizo). Aizawl: V.L.B Press.
- Liangkhaia, Reverend (1938). Mizo Chanchin (Mizo History) (in Mizo). Aizawl: L.T.L Publications.
- Lalthangliana, B. (2005). Culture and Folklore of Mizoram. India: Publications Division.
