= Sakhua =

Ethnic religion of the Mizo people

Mizo religion
- Sakhua
- Type: Ethnic religion
- Classification: Animism
- Theology: Polytheism
- God: Pathian or Pu Vana
- Divine force: Khua
- Region: Mizoram, India
- Language: Mizo
- Members: 1,367
- Other names: Lushai animism, Khua worship

Sakhua (lit. "deity divine force"), also known as Mizo religion, Lushai animism or Khua worship, is a traditional polytheistic ethnic faith practiced by the Mizo people prior to the widespread adoption of Christianity during the British annexation of Mizoram. As of the 2001 census, 1,367 people in Mizoram continued to practice this indigenous faith.

== Etymology ==
Various arguments have been provided on the meaning of the syllables Sa and Khua. Lalbiakthanga provides a literal translation denoting Sa (transl. meat) and Khua (transl. village). Expanding upon meanings, other authors such as Liangkhaia argued that Sa refers to the origin of which a person individually belongs by birth via the clan, tribe or family they descend. Liangkhaia argues khua component represents Khuavang/Khuanu regarded as the watcher or keeper of the khua term representing village. In placing the interpretation of Sakhua within the context of Pathian, Sa is seen as the root and origin of men and their clans and khua as the representation of Pathian as sustainer, protector and benefactor of human destiny.

Khua is strongly identified with the concept of fate. Terms such as Khuarel (transl. destined by Khua) holds the equivalent usage of God's will in the Chrisitan context of Mizo society.

== Definitions ==
Vanlaltlani defines Sakhua as the worship of a benevolent unseen God, Pathian, who resides in heaven and acts as the creator, protector, and benefactor of all creation. She also considers that animism was just one element of the Sakhua belief system.

In contrast, Saiaithanga states that Sakhua does not involve the worship of Pathian or the Ramhuai (spirits dwelling in forests and lands). Instead, it focuses on Khuavang, regarded as the spirit that provides protection and blessings.

Rev. Liangkhaia explains Sakhua as rooted in spirit appeasement, involving sacrificial rituals led by a priest (Sadâwt) to honor the Ramhuai. He further interprets "Sa" as signifying a clan and "Khua" as the village's protector. Zairema shares this view, considering Sakhua the guardian spirit representing a clan's identity.

== Stories ==
=== Creation of the Earth ===
Khuazingnu was considered as the benevolent deity who created the earth and everything on it. It was assumed that she also created the environment that surrounded all creation. This included the land that encompassed the entire earth. Finally, Khuazingnu solved the problem. She'd open the skylights. After that, she would fling water from these exact windows out of the sky and onto the barren dryness of the soil, all to keep the greenery that was slowly but surely dwindling. To this day, many Mizos shout that "the goddess of the heavens is dousing us with water."

Then, Khuazingnu placed a representative couple from each human tribe and animal species in a cave. And once everyone was inside, she blocked the cave with a massive boulder known as Chhinlung. After generations were born inside the cave, Khuazingnu lifted the Chhinlung rock, believing that enough people had been born to repopulate the earth. The many clans emerged from the cave in large numbers. When the Ralte clan, noted for being loud and boisterous, emerged from the cave, Khuazingnu decided to reposition the Chhinlung rock over the cave's mouth, believing that the Ralte clan's huge noise had drawn enough people out. Till today, the Ralte clan is known as "Ralte bengchheng," which translates to "noisy/rowdy Ralte."

== Deities ==
=== Pathian ===
Pathian is considered the supreme God who created the world and all that there is in it. The tribal Mizos worshipped Pathian as it was believed that Pathian was kind-hearted and would always help those who sought it. It is believed that Pathian bestows the righteous with blessings and good fortune and punishes the wicked with calamities and misfortunes.

=== Pathian's personalities ===
Despite these forms of Pathian and aspects represented, the Mizos traditionally did not pray to or worship any of the other forms.

Pu Vâna (transl. God in Heaven) is a benevolent spirit who was the Pathian family's grandfather and most likely the father of Pathian. He is worshipped as the god of nature. As he is endowed with the power of thunder and lightning, he can be compared and seen parallel to Indra of the Hindu religion.

Vanchungnula (transl. Heaven's maiden) was believed to be the damsel in the family of Pathian and is the goddess of rain and water. It is said that she is Pathian's daughter and would pour water whenever humans require it.

Vanhrika is the God of science and magic.

=== Khuanu ===
The Mizos revered the feminine deity Khuanu, meaning 'mother of nature'. She is the wife of Pathian and is a benevolent Goddess who blesses humans as a matriarchal figure. Khuanu is assumed to be a representation of Pathian's loving nature.

== Spirits ==
=== Benevolent spirit ===
Khuavang are benevolent spirits who have never caused harm to people but rather help in their difficulties. They are seen as glittering fairies. They are thought to live in high places, such as mountains or hills. Khuavang are a symbol of kindness and abundance. It is believed that the Khuavang bestow many children and long married lives on humans.

Lasi is a hunting spirit. She is classified as a naked fairy of all jungle life. Her blessings were needed for successful hunting expeditions. Their main inhabiting location is described as the Vanlaiphai ranges.

Khaltu is known as the guardian spirit. The Khaltu spirit is associated with people's lives and well-being. Every living creature is thought to have a thla (soul), and as long as the soul remained in the body, the person was considered to be alive. If a person had a terrifying experience, such as being mauled by wild animals or captured by an enemy, the soul was similarly terrified, and a sacrifice was required to restore proper and normal relations with the "khaltu." If the experience was further intensified, a goat was sacrificed; the tail was severed and tied around the neck with a string. Breaking this string was a serious offence for the Mizos, possibly as serious as breaking the sacred tread for Hindus.

=== Ramhuai ===
Ramhuai were believed to be of queer varying shapes, sometimes resembling humans or grotesque representations much larger and colossal in relation to human size. Some ramhuai possessed curly hair, or eyes in a vertical line down the centre of the brow. Some were believed to have massive bosoms hanging downwards or have one leg. The forms of ramhuai are omniscient and took on any shape. Furthermore, traditionally no Mizos claimed to have witnessed a ramhuai for it would lead to social ostracization. The exception for witnessing are dreams where one can have contact with one.

A ramhuai was typically found in natural locations such as high mountains, caves, under water, cracks in rocks, large rocks, holes in the earth, water springs, waterfalls and large trees.

Phung is a spirit that was a large and dark creature of colossal size. They were thought to frequent roads and paths, causing humans to suffer from insanity and epilepsy. Convulsions or spasms in children were also thought to be caused by the "phung's" displeasure.

Khawhring was a spirit responsible for sadness and grief by ruining a person with a curse of an evil eye. The spirit was seen as consumed by greed to possess the riches of others. It would watch people's food and drink with evil eyes. As it was believed these spirits possessed food and drink, the Mizos would offer a portion of their food to the evil spirits before eating and drinking. If someone was thought to be possessed by "khawhring," it was almost legal to kill that person.

Hmuithla was an evil spirit that was thought to afflict both humans and animals as a forerunner of death. This spirit roams the night, looking for humans and animals on the verge of death. It would sometimes produce eerie noises as it hovered around the house of one that was dying. if one were to approach the Hmuithla it would disappear at will and unable to be approached. This was similar to "Yamraj", in Hinduism.

Pheichham was a spirit who would grant wishes and rewards for a heavy price. The price for receiving from the pheichham would often be actions of sinister or hostile nature. It was described as having only one leg and was hasty in that if its wish was not fulfilled quickly it would depart quickly. In some cases it would punish individuals with sickness and misfortune.

Maimi was a hypnotising spirit or disturbed others during sleep. As it was a harmless spirit, children would sleep in gardens outside in an attempt to communicate with it. Rawt was a spirit known for frightening people. The rawt would scare people working in the fields and were considered powerful without an appearance. Taumeichher Chhi was a spirit similar to the will of the wisp phenomenon. Chaum was the spirit that instigated crab poisoning. Taul Hik was the spirit known as the skinner of heads. Khaumu was a spirit that kidnapped humans. The people who went out to travel would be taken by Khaumu and disappear without a trace. Dengsuru was a demon who threw stones at people. The Dengsuru typically live in trees in caves and are known to go as far as to beat people.

Tulum is a spirit which inhabits a corpse. Much like a zombie, the spirit enters both animals or humans and reanimates them. The Tulum do not harm living beings. A tulum inhabits an individual who dies from exposure to the elements, such as snow or rain.

Sikhuai was a ramhuai that caused sickness to humans who consumed water from clear looking springs. Sacrifices would be placed around springs and special sacrifices made so that any hunting attempts of animals would not be disrupted around the spring.

Hautaii was a ramhuai who would trouble women and their duties. The spirit would cause wood loads to topple, baskets to fall, rice to overboil and objects becoming lost. To deal with the Hautaii's hijinks, a chair fit for Hautaii's mother would be made to appease it.

== Priesthood ==
An individual who carried out a religious activity was known as a puithiam. There were three types of puithiam.

A sadâwt was a village priest who belonged to the Chief. Each clan of the Mizos had their own sadâwt but they weren't as influential or important as the lal sadâwt (transl. high priest). The lal sadâwt handled all ceremonies and rituals conducted by the chief himself. The priesthood of sadâwt was hereditary with some elements of selection and discretion of appointment. The village chief has the power to place confidence in a sadâwt or remove him. For their service, a sadawt could claim taxation for the rituals with the left foreleg of an animal. Most sadâwt were descended and part of the Hauhnar clan of the Lusei tribe.

A tlahpawi is a helper or assistant of the sadâwt. The tlahpawi held equal hierarchy with the sadâwt as they could take over the role of a sadâwt if they couldn't carry out the rituals. A tlahpawi was essentially compulsory for a lal sadâwt. A tlahpawi carried out prayers related to divination and often acted as a fortune teller or soothsayer for individuals participating in rituals. They were appointed by the chief and tended to be a friend or ally of the chief, and were removed by the chief if they lost confidence. Only the Lusei claim of the Mizos had a tlahpawi.

A bawlpu was a priest who officiated rituals for common people. Their status was notably lower in hierarchy than a sadâwt or tlahpawi. Whenever an individual was sick, a bawlpu would be summoned as a physician or sage to assess the cause of illnesses. He would assess the pulse of the sick and prescribe a sacrificial ceremony for the family to appease the suffering and trouble caused by spirits. The family were obligated to follow the orders of the bawlpu. The sacrifice would occur on the outskirts of the village referred to as Bawlhmun or Bawlmual which every village had. The profession of a bawlpu was hereditary and the incantations were kept secret as they were passed down through family generations. A son would only take over when the father became too old to continue duties. The bawlpu were entitled to collecting tax of rice paddies formthe villagers. A whole basket of rice was common rule of remuneration in most villages which was called fawng. For each ritual, the person undergoing ritual would also pay the bawlpu a half basket of rice paddy for doing the ritual known as faidam.

A bawlpu would also fight against dawisut (transl. witchcraft). Jobs in fighting witchcraft received a large payment of a whole sial (transl. gayal), which soon became standardised to ₹40 after the introduction of currency. Most bawlpu came from non-Lusei tribes such as the Hmar clans. The qualification for becoming a bawlpu was learning the incantations.

== Rituals ==
=== Sabiak ===
Sabiak (lit. 'to hold conversation with') refers to worship. Each Mizo clan had its exclusive Sakhua which was performed by a sadâwt (transl. priest). Sabiak encouraged various stages of an individual to advance spiritually until becoming a Thangchhuah.

=== Sakung ===
Sakung is a religious obligation for a newly married person in a separate house from their parents to perform. The first male pig known as vawkpa sutnghak were reared for this ritual. That particular pig was prepared for the purpose of Sakung. The sadâwt would conduct the worship and declare the Sa as whom our forefather and foremother had worshipped. After three days, the Sabiak made a man independent of his father's Sakhua and attained his own family religion. A sadâwt (priest) would perform it in the house in the evening. It would consist of sacred chants and the sacrificing of the pig with a bamboo rod. The sharp end of the bamboo rod would be pierced to the region opposite of the pig's heart. The bamboo weapon would then be hanged in the outmost post of the hast and tied with bamboo split with the pointed side downwards. The sadâwt would tie the bamboo rod and the pig's head with some pieces of meat in the back corner of the house along with the weapon. This would be repeated and the remaining meat would be cooked and eaten. Sakung would be done for three days. The family were not allowed guests, to work, visit public places, eat sour fruit and attend funeral meetings. After three days the sadâwt would chant religious rites known as thian which would conclude the ceremony and allow the family to live normally.

=== Chawng ===
The next stage of Sabiak was to work towards Chawng/ Chawngfang. This ritual required a man to host a community feast with two male pigs, one female pig and forty ngans of Zû. The pigs were killed as a Sabiak by the sadâwt. The ritual would be identical to Sakung. The priests assistant (tlahpawi) would be responsible for conducting divination for each individual member of the house. The tlahpawi ceremony would allow one to see their future. This was done with the priest using bamboo splits and breaking them by pulling on them with force. If the breaking was smoothly cut then it was considered a bad omen. An uneven breaking were preferred instead for good luck and prosperity. Upon completing the Chawng ceremony, the man would earn the title of Chawngpa and his wife would gain the title of Chawngnu.

=== Dawi no chhui ===
The third stage was known as Dawi no chhui. This required multiple feasts to be performed. However, the ability to continuously hold the feasts depended on the wealth and capacity of the Chawngpa. These feasts were limited only to the family of the worshipper and required a sadâwt to offer the animals required of the feasts. Each of the festivals required three days of preparation and restrained the family members from speaking to strangers or hosting strangers in the home, eating sour fruit, weaving or sympathising with those in mourning. This stage would be repeated on an regular basis. The festivals for the Dawi no chhui were Hnuiate, Hnuaipui, CHung, Vausen and Lasi.

In Hnuiate, the Lasi was the spirit worshipped, which was believed to stay around the house, and would give blessings. A female piglet would be offered with an incantation.

In Hnuaipui, a fully grown female pig was sacrificed to a spirit known as thuah hrat. The thruah hrat were believed to be spirits deep within the earth. The earth was believed to be ten layers and the tenth layer was known to be filled with spirits called thruah hrat.

Chung was a sacrificial ceremony for the spirit who had power over the sun and rain by offering of a piglet.

Vansen was a ceremony for the worship of a spirit who lives on the clouds and abundantly blessed humans. A cockerel would be offered. The cockerel would be cooked and eaten at a temporary hearth and water storage place. The sadâwt kept a part of the meat (Saserh) on the ceiling of the water storage. The saserh typically was every outer part of the cockerel apart from its liver and kidney.

Lasi is known as the spirit of hunting and possessed controls over animals. The lasi was worshipped with a female piglet for the blessing of becoming a successful and skilled hunter.

=== Sedawi ===
The fourth stage is Sedawi/Sedawi chhun which was a practice of spearing a sial (transl. Gayal). A young male sial would be chosen which was supposed to have pairs of horns and ears of equal length. Special timber posts (seluphan were erected to fix the skulls of the sial and pigs.

The sadâwt would travel with the worshipper and five men into the forest to select the appropriate tree to carve the post out of. One of the five men was expected to be a close friend or relative of the worshipper. When the sadâwt found the tree they would spit zû from their mouths onto the tree three times and chant an incantation. This would be followed by another ritual of throwing pellets three times at the upper end of the tree as the men chanted "Akhum e,, (transl. The pellet flied over the tree). The sadâwt would then stab the tree with his dao (transl. dagger). The rest of the men would strike until the tree fell. Upon being felled the sadâwt would declare ka arhlui khuangin a thai thluk e (transl. the fall was caused by my crowing cock). The sadâwt would with a hen in hand, chant as incantation as the tiber was being cut and formed.

Upon reaching home, the sadâwt would make a hole in the ground by drawing a circle with a porcupine quill and chanting an incantation. He would strike the ground once as if a hole was made before the rest of the men would dig it out. Upon making the post, it would be planted in the front yard of the worshipper. The sadâwt placed an egg at one end of the forked tree before entering the house and reciting more incantations. The sadâwt would place zû into a gourd and place the gourd in between the outermost post to set aside for the hnuaipui spirit and would be repeated for the chung, vansen, hnuaite and lasi.

The sadâwt would chant incantations and use the names of each family member to bless them. These blessings were known as Thlahual. The incantation was followed by slaughtering a pig. Another ceremony of tlahpawi would be carried out to determine the good and bad omens of each family member of the worshipper's family.

Members of extended families and other villages would be invited for drinking and feasting. The day before the feat, the animal to be speared would be held down and tortured for the whole day. The animal would be bound by the neck and tethered and pulled in many directions by people until it was close to fainting from exhaustion. The day of the festival required a spear (sefei), a porcupine quill, four feathers of a hen, five chestnut leaves and a small quantity of zû. The sadâwt would construct a small temporary house and perform a prayer over the leaves and spear. The day of the feast began with a sakhua made in the jungle by the sadâwt to invoke a blessing and long life for the family of the worshipper. The sadâwt and assistant (tlahpawi) would splash zû three times, then from their mouths onto the animal three times while it was tied to the sacrificial post (seluphan) with an incantation. The zû would finally be splashed on the location of where the animal was to be speared. The worshipper was made to recite an incantation and accompanied by the sadâwt back into the home without turning back to cause bad luck. The worshipper then spears the sial in the armpit just to make a scratch, and then the veteran killers hack the animal to death and then cook and feast on its meat. However, this sabiak didn't address sakhua but directly invoked Pathian and the sacred names associated with him. A fattened pig would be directly sacrificed to Pathian. The celebration lasted for a week.

However the ritual lasted as long as three months. The ritual would officially end three months later with the sacrifice of a young pig in a ritual known selulawh. The skull of the sial would be removed from the post and taken to a special place with a spear and zû. The spear was placed near the post and the container of zû known specifically as zupeng for the ritual was left near the post. An egg was broken by the sadâwt and rubbed on the spear with an incantation. The sacrificer then kills the male pig with the same incantation form sakung ritual. The head of the sial was removed from the post with an incantation and kept as a trophy thus ending the ritual of sedawi.

=== Sekhuang ===
Sekhuang, also known as Mitthirawp lam, was a ritual to make three small drums out of hollowed out wood, producing three different notes or tones known as talkhuang. The drums were to be kept at the seluphan post used for the sedawi ceremony. Led by a sadâwt the worshipper would go to the jungle to spot any of the two trees allowed to be used for the ritual. The sadâwt took the dried skull of a he-goat to hit the tree with before it was cut. While striking the tree with the skull, the sadâwt uttered "Be, B, Be, Hei kei ni kihthluk in ni lo va, kel pa sil thluk in ni e" (transl. you fell not because of us but because of the hit of the goat.) Once the drums were made, they were entitled to be played by feast goers to the upcoming thangchhuah festival. The mitthirawp lam ritual would also see cotton effigies of the worshipper's ancestors as far back as they can be remembered and having meat offered to them.

=== Khuangchawi ===
Khuangchawi was the highest festival and the final stage for an individual to enter pialrâl. This festival was rare and only performed in the month of October known as Khuangchawi thla (transl. month of Khuangchawi) where the mmon is brightest and there wasn't work to be done on their jhums. The requirements for the ceremony were two fully grown sial for khua, one mother sial for the children and two male pigs for the sa. Preparation of the festival took around three months. The father-in-law of the worshipper assumed most responsibility for arranging the celebration. Guests from other villages would enter the village hosting the ceremony in a dance known as Khuallum led by the val upa (transl. leader of zawlbuk). The young villagers would enter with zû pipes all the way from their village with drums, spears and guns. After the feast, the closest relatives carried the feast host and his wife in a special box (khuanghlang into the courtyard of the chief. The hosts would throw some brass vessels, gongs, guns and other luxuries to the villagers. After the feast seven days would be kept with restricted activity. Three months after the feast sedawi would be performed. After completing the festival, the worshipper now attained the title of thangchhuahpa or Zahzawzo which enabled him to make windows in his house, a raised veranda, and a front room. The thangchhuahpa was known as a inlama changchhuahpa for hosting the khuangchawi festival. This was opposed to the alternative way to earn the title which was to hunt a variety of animals and become an accomplished hunter. Above the title of Thangchhuahpa was the title of Zaudawh which required three rounds of khuangchawi. However only one chief ever managed to attain this title in oral history of the Mizos known as Vuta.

The alternative way of becoming a thangchhuahpa was a ramlama thangchhuah via hunting. It required the killing of barking deer, sambar deer, bear, wild boar and a wild gayal. Each hunt required an ai ceremony for the animal killed which required expensive feasts of domesticated animals. A ramlama thangchhuah was believed to be accompanied by all the animals they had slain in the afterlife and thus be granted the prestige of entering pialrâl.

== Afterlife ==
The Mizos believed that all living beings had spirits. Upon death, the spirits go to two possible places. The first is mitthi khua (transl. village of the dead). Mitthi khua is separated by pialrâl (transl. heaven) by a river known as Pial. The way to mitthi khua passes through Rih Dil in present day Myanmar. Seven roads lead to mitthi khua. On the route to Rih Dil, the spirit cross the mountain called Hringlang tlang which has a view of the mortal world to take a last glance of the material abode. The spirit then drinks Lungloh tui (transl. water of feelinglessness) and plucl a hawilopâr (transl. flower of no-turning back) onto their ear and proceed.

The roads then converge where Pu Pawla judges the spirit. Pu Pawla is the first man to have died and is armed with a pellet bow who strikes and wounds spirits who haven't earned his respect. Only a still born, a man who has taken three virgins or been with seven women, or a Thangchhuahpa will avoid being struck by Pu Pawla. No women is ever exempt from Pu Pawla's shot. Individuals who are shot are wounded for three years and made to travel to mithhi khua while those who are spared are allowed to progress to pialrâl. In mitthi khua, life requires labour and is considered miserable. Pialrâl however is a paradise where one can consume food and zû without any labour.

== Revival ==
Hnam Sakhua is a modernized traditional Mizo religion that places a special emphasis on the Mizo culture and seeks to revive traditional Mizo values while opposing the influence of Christianity on the Mizo people.

== Sources ==
- McCall, Anthony Gilchrist (1949). Lushai Chrysalis. Calcutta: Firma KLM. p. 202.
- Nghakliana, T. (1983). Mizote ramhuai hriatdan [Mizo people's knowledge of demons] (in Mizo). Lunglei: Makedonis Printing Press.
- Sangkima (2004). Essays on the History of the Mizos. Guwahati: Spectrum Publications. ISBN 81-87502-77-0.
- Shakespear, John (1912). The Lushei and Kuki Clans. London: Macmillan and Co., Limited. p. 44.
- Vanlalchhuanawma (2007). Christianity and Subaltern Cuture: Revival Movement as a Cultural Response to Westernisation in Mizoram. Delhi: Indian Society for Promoting Christian Knowledge. ISBN 81-7214-901-8.
- Zarzoa, Lal (2014). "Traditional Religion of the Lusei (Mizo) Tribe in the Premodern Age". The International Journal of Religion and Spirituality in Society. 4 (1). Granada: Common Ground Research Networks: 1–10. doi:10.18848/2154-8633/CGP/v04i01/51079.
