= Lister Expedition =

Punitive Expedition against Mora (1850)

Date	13 January 1850 - 23 January 1850
Location	Lushai Hills
Result	British Victory; Subjugation of Mora; Release of 400 captives

Belligerents
(British Raj) British Raj; United Kingdom	Lushai chiefdoms

Commanders and leaders
(British Raj) Frederick George Lister	Mora

Units involved
Sylhet Light Infantry	Tribal Militias; Raiding parties

Strength
200 men	

The Lister Expedition was a punitive expedition in 1850 against Lushai chiefs such as Ngûra who raided Cachar. It is referred to as the Lister Expedition, which was headed by Colonel Frederick George Lister.

== Background ==
In November 1849, the Magistrate of Sylhet reported a series of raids on the Simla River within British territory. A party of wood-cutters had been attacked. Another attack had followed up on a village of Halams (a class of Tipperahs), which had been cut up and destroyed. Reports from Cachar stated that the Lushais, under Chief Lalianvunga and his son Ngûra, had attacked a Kuki settlement ten miles south of Silchar belonging to Seyahpow. The raid saw 29 people killed and 42 captives taken. Lallianvunga and Ngûra would subsequently attack the village of Chief Leelong and burn it down before withdrawing back.

== Lister's Expedition ==
The government resolved on a strong response. The King of Hill Tipperah, Ishan Chandra Manikya, was ordered to summon the guilty chiefs and their warriors to release the captives. The British warned him that if he was unable to fulfil the demand, the British would march a force into his territory to enforce justice.

Colonel Lister, the commandant of the Sylhet Infantry and Agent for the Khasi Hills was made responsible for the expedition. Lister was instructed to not heed to any land disputes or claims by the King of Tripura in regards to British holdings. Inquiries showed that the Sylhet raid was far within British territory along with the Cachar raid. Friendly Kuki scouts reported that the attacking party belonged to Khojawal or the Kachak tribe. The settlement was established two days march southeast of Chutterchoora. The Kuki scouts offered to join the expedition to the settlements of the tribe.

On 13 January 1850, the expedition was preparing for departure when another raid occurred. In Sylhet, a boundary point in dispute of the King of Tripura known as Thannah Latoo was raided. Originally the responsibility was assigned to the targeted tribe of the expedition before it was realized that Tripuri subjects had done it. The enquiry was not followed up afterwards.

Colonel Lister's force marched from Silchar on 4 January 1850. The expedition consisted of 200 men. Mules and elephants limited the party's ability to penetrate the Lushai Hills. The road was dangerous due to small rivulets and dense jungles. He was helped by Chief Salpoe who supplied coolies. Salpoe also contributed to the force with food and ryots.

On 14 January, Lister arrived at a village belonging to a chief called Ngûra. Ngûra built his capital settlement at the top of a high mountain. The expedition sounded their bugles which echoed across the hills but no shots were fired. It was assumed that the warriors had undertaken a hunting party trip or another raid while the expedition had reached the village. The expedition was also considered to be a surprise as most Lushai chiefs didn't expect the British to be able to locate their settlements. Salpoe's coolies and auxiliaries in Lister's force provided the information required to achieve this. The settlement possessed 800-1000 houses full of grain, cotton and other resources. On 16 January, Lister entered the village with no resistance as Ngûra had retreated to his settlement at the top of the hill. The force managed to free 429 captives. Lister was cautious on account of Salpoe's kukis' advice and didn't ascend the mountain with his smaller force. Lister had observed the capital settlement with a telescope and observed a well fortified position on an uphill incline to reach it. On 16 January, Ngûra's settlement was burnt down, and Lister retreated after its destruction. Lister would return on 23 January. When questioned on cutting the expedition short, he reasoned that severe damage would have occurred to the force if he had delayed.

== Lister's report ==
Lister prepared a report on the details of the expedition to the secretary of the Bengal Government on 2 February 1850 from Cherrapunji. He stated the expedition began on 4 January 1850 with a detachment of 200 men. The road was dangerous due to the small rivulets and dense jungles. Elephants and supply caravans with great difficulty overcame the terrain of the Lushai Hills. After Mora's village's destruction, the journey was taken from 17 to 23 January. As a result, for the report, the government of Bengal readily agreed to the suggestions and appointed him Frontier Officer to ward off the Lushai raids. With this, the interference of British authorities from Sylhet became restrained. Lister was reassigned from Sylhet to Cachar as a result. Lister's report on the expedition is also considered one of the earliest analysis and observations of the Lushai Hills prior to widespread communication and familiarization. Chatterjee argues that the quarrels of British bureaucracy between Tripura and Sylhet shifted the focus away from understanding the Lushai Hills and the threat they carried in their raids. The British failed to see the new Sailo chiefs descended from Lallula take over the Lushai Hills in the north and West. Lister's report is provided below from Alexander Mackenzie's 1884 book on British relations with the Northeast Hill Tribes:

The Lushais are a very powerful tribe under the Government of six sirdars, of whom one is the acknowledged chief. They all have their separate cantonments with a number of dependent villages attached. In these cantonments the fighting men reside; in the dependent villages are located their ryots, who are merely used as coolies, and for tilling the soil. They consist, in many instances, of the captives they have brought away in their different expeditions, a great part of them probably taken as mere children and gradually reconciled to their captivity.
The fighting part of the Lushai population are composed, first, of Lushai who appear to be a cross between the Kookies and Burmese; secondly, of a certain number of true Burmese, entertained for the purposes of warfare; and thirdly, of refugees and outlaws from Manipur and our own frontier.
The chief who is now at the head of these tribes by name Barmoeelin is said to have 300 Burmese in his service. His headquarters, which lay to the south-west of Mora's village, I could see plainly with a telescope. It appeared to be a cantonment laid out with the utmost regularity, and containing, I should say, not less than three thousand fighting men, and from what I saw, and the information I have received, I do not consider this beyond the mark. The Burmese portion of the force are armed with muskets and dows, the remainder with spears and dows.
I have before remarked that the Lushai are a cross between the Kookies and Burmese, and this opinion is strengthened by the belief universally prevalent that a part turned to Ava, but settled in the jungles south of Cachar. Almost all the other kookie tribes are migratory in their habits, changing their residence every two or three years but from ther substantial way in which the Lushai villages are built, I cam convinced they are a stationary tribe, and this stamps them as different from the other Kookies, who one and all entertain a great dread of them.
His honor will remark on the facility with which I gained possession of a large village in the face of this powerful people. But to explain this, I have only to state that with very few exceptions, the whole fighting population of this village were absent on one of their marauding excursions, added to which they were taken completely by surprise, as the path by which I approached the cantonments they believed to be known only to themselves; and as all their lookouts were posted on the main road, they were in utter ignorance of my movements.
On reaching the village, however, and discovering the description of country I had got into, the distance from any supports, and the difficulties of the road, I considered I should be compromising the safety of my detachment by remaining a longer time than would suffice to give the men necessary rest.
The nature of the country is such, that a few stockades thrown up at certain points would serve to cut off all communication and these, expert as the Kookies I heard from my spies that Barmooelin's village was full of men, and they could have intercepted me at any point along the road. Indeed, although I was only one night in Mora's village, yet in that intervene they had commenced stocktaking the direct road, with a view of cutting me off, though probably not anticipating my so speedy return, the works were not complete and no attempt was made to defend them. No doubt a short delay on my part would have enabled them to raise the whole country to intercept my line of march. Even as it is, I have some reason for thinking they expected me to return by the path I had taken in going, and had I chosen that route I should probably have met with some opposition. it is not their muskets or other offensive weapons that are to be dreaded, but their expertness in the use of the dow, and the facilities in which their jungles afford, both in materials and position for throwing obstacles in the way of an advance or retreat.
There can be no doubt that Mullah was the chief whose people committed the outrage on the Roopa Cherra in November last, and to confirm this, an abkaree perwannah was found in his house, bearing the name of a man belonging to the Tripoorah village, which was plunged on that occasion and dated 1849. Lalpoo the chief who conducted the expedition into Cachar, had died a few days before I reached the Lushai country.
One gratifying circumstance attending the expedition I have now to record, which is that during the confusion caused by the destruction of his cantonment, 429 captives made their escape from the villages dependent on Mora and succeeded in finding their way to Cachar. This, and the loss of consequent on the destruction of all his property, will probably cripple him for some time, but he is only one of the petty chiefs, and I cannot feel assured that my expedition will have had little real effect on the tribe at large, further than shewing them that is it possible for us to penetrate their jungles.
I am of opinion that to put down these people effectually would employ a well appointed force of not less than three thousand men. From 500 to 1000 of these would be required for keeping open the road from Cachar and protecting the various reports (since there are several bypaths leading on to the main road easily passable for the Kookies), and the remainder for carrying on operations in the country. A portion of this force ought to consist of Europeans, as a great deal of stockade work might be expected from the great abundance of materials and the ease and rapidity with which these people run up stockades, to which may be added the well known character of the Burmese for this kind of warfare.
From the nature of the country (all the ranges of hills running north and south), I feel convinced that an attack from any other quarter, except Cachar, would be attended with the greatest difficulty and, indeed, is in my opinion impracticable. Towards the Chittagong side the ranges rise higher and higher and both from that direction and from Sylhet or Comillah numerous ranges of hills, as well as difficult swamps and unfordable rivers, would have to be crossed; whereas from Cachar a good chain of hills runs down unbroken into the enemy's country, and along this a good practicable road might be constructed by a couple of companies of pioneers aided by builders and Kookies to cut the jungle. The road might be commenced on the 1st of November and it could be completed in a month. Depots for provisions would have to be formed along the road. All supplies must come from Cachar and very extensive Commissariat arrangements would of course be necessary.
It will be for his honor to decide whether such considerable operations should be entered upon. I can only state my views that, unless something decisive is done, the whole of Cachar south of the Barak and probably a great extent of country south of Sylhet will become a desert. The Lushais have been getting bolder, and extending their ravages further every year, and I feel convinced they are the authors of all the massacres committed on the frontier from year to year.
Even allowing that small detachments could penetrate into their country from time to time and destroy one or two of their villages, this would be at very considerable risk and would only have the effect of inciting them to fresh outrages from a spirit of revenge. Unless their independence as a powerful tribe is quite broken, the frontier will never be free from their attacks.
That they acknowledge no allegiance to the Tipperah Raja is certain; but whether as is reported, he or his ministers have any means of communicating with them, I cannot say. Certainly he must be powerless to prevent their ravages. Should he, however, have any means to his disposal, I think that he as well as the Raja of Manipur should be invested to co-operate in whatever measures my be taken for effectual putting down of these miscreants.
As a temporary measure, I venture to suggest the arming with muskets of a few hundred Kookies (could they be got to serve) under a young, active and enterprising European officer. These I would have taught to fire with accuracy; nothing more; and I would post them in stockards along the frontier at the most frequented passes into Sylhet and Cachar. Many of the Kookies who accompanied me expressed their willingness to take service and said that armed with muskets they would have no dread of the Lushais.
I would further suggest that all condemned muskets belonging to the Sulhet Light Infantry should be handed over to the Superintendent of Cachar for distribution among the frontier villages, and I would recommend that that officer be authorized to indent for ammunition, to be served out at his discretion.

— Frederick George Lister, Lister's Report on the Expedition to Secretary of Bengal Government, History of the Relations of the government with the Hills Tribes of the North-east Frontier of Bengal, Alexander Mackenzie, 1884

== Sources ==
- Chatterjee, Suhas (1985). British rule in Mizoram. New Delhi: Mittal Publications.
- Chatterjee, Suhas (1995). Mizo Chiefs and the Chiefdom. New Delhi: Mittal Publications. ISBN 81-85880-72-7.
- Chatterjee, Suhas (2009). Frontier Officers in Colonial Northeast India. New Delhi: Akansha Publishing House. ISBN 978-81-8370-168-6.
- Chatterjee, Suhas (1990). Mizo Encyclopaedia. Aizawl: Jaico Publishing House.
- Griffin, Charles. "8th Gurkha Rifles:44th Sylhet Light Infantry". The British Empire.
- Mackenzie, Alexander (1884). History of the Relations of the government with the Hill Tribes of the North-East Frontier of Bengal. Calcutta: Home Department Press.
- Shakespear, L.W (1929). History of the Assam Rifles. London: Macmillan and Co, Limited.
