= Mizo chieftainship =

System of indigenous cultural administration of the Mizo people

Lushai Chiefdoms Mizoram
- c. 1540–1954
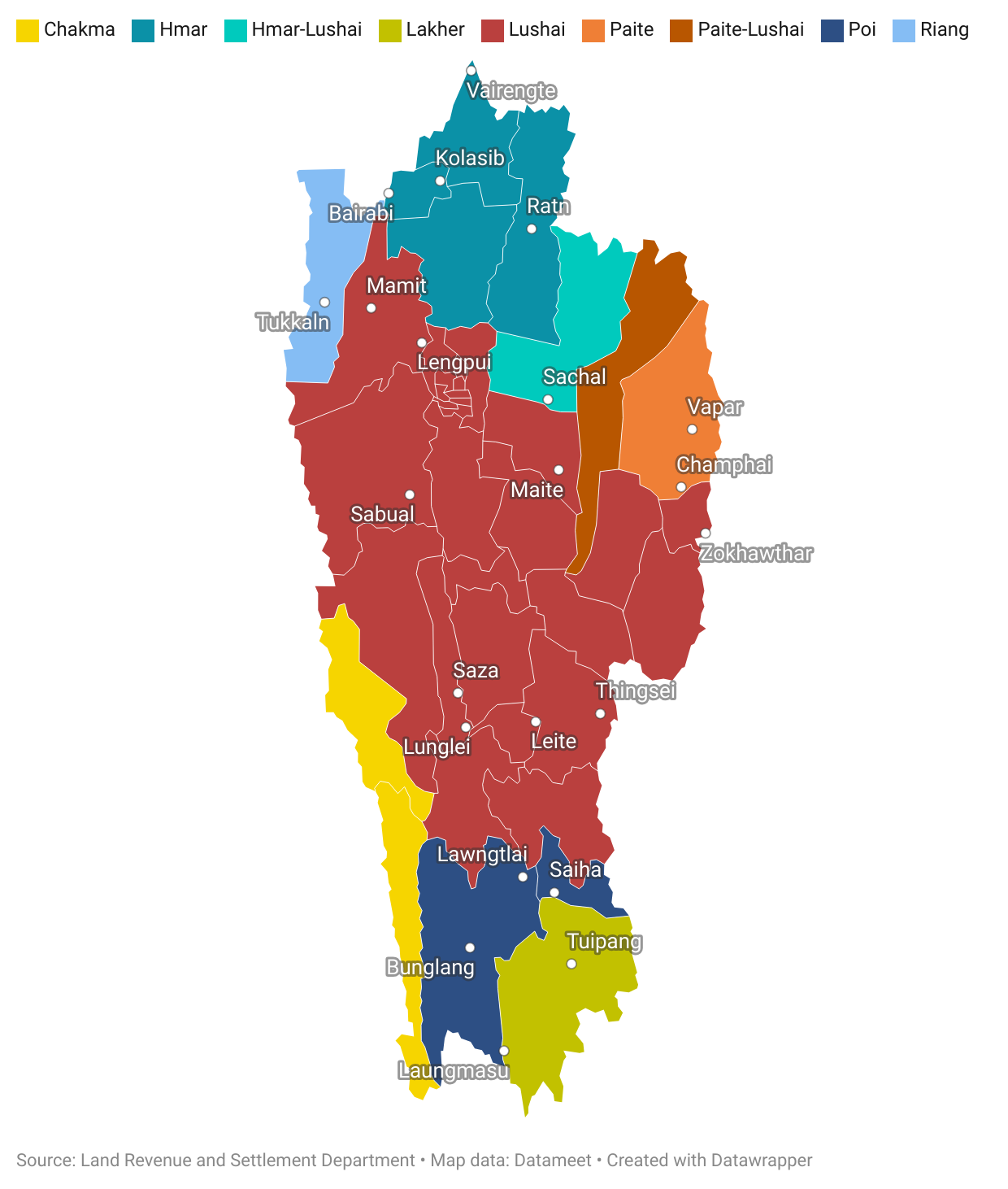
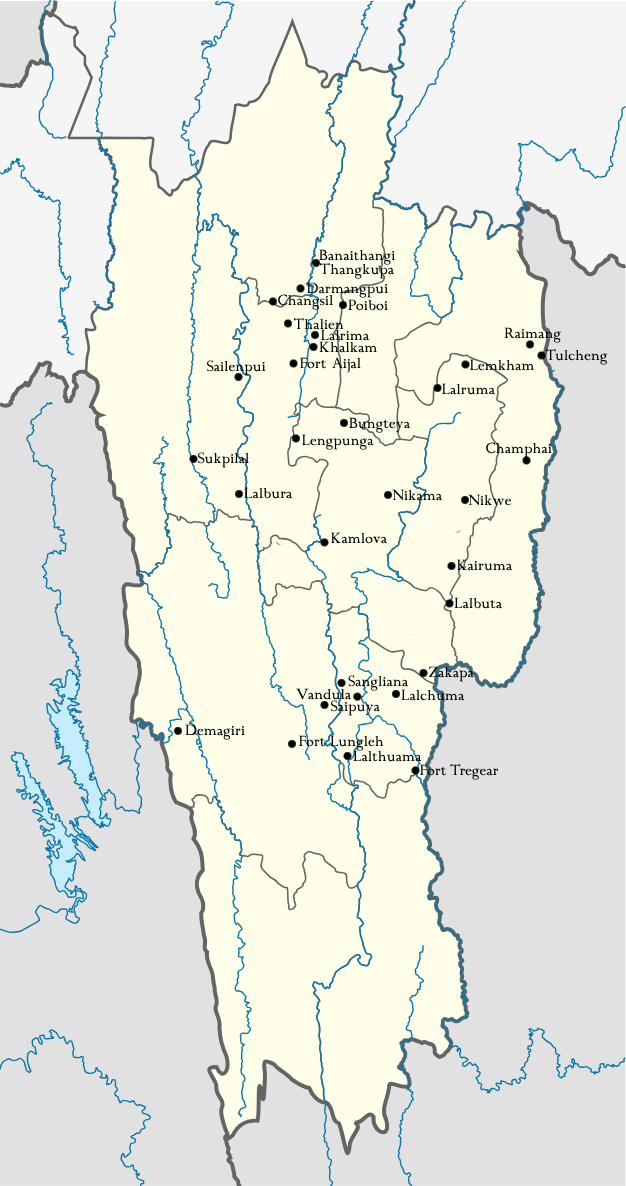
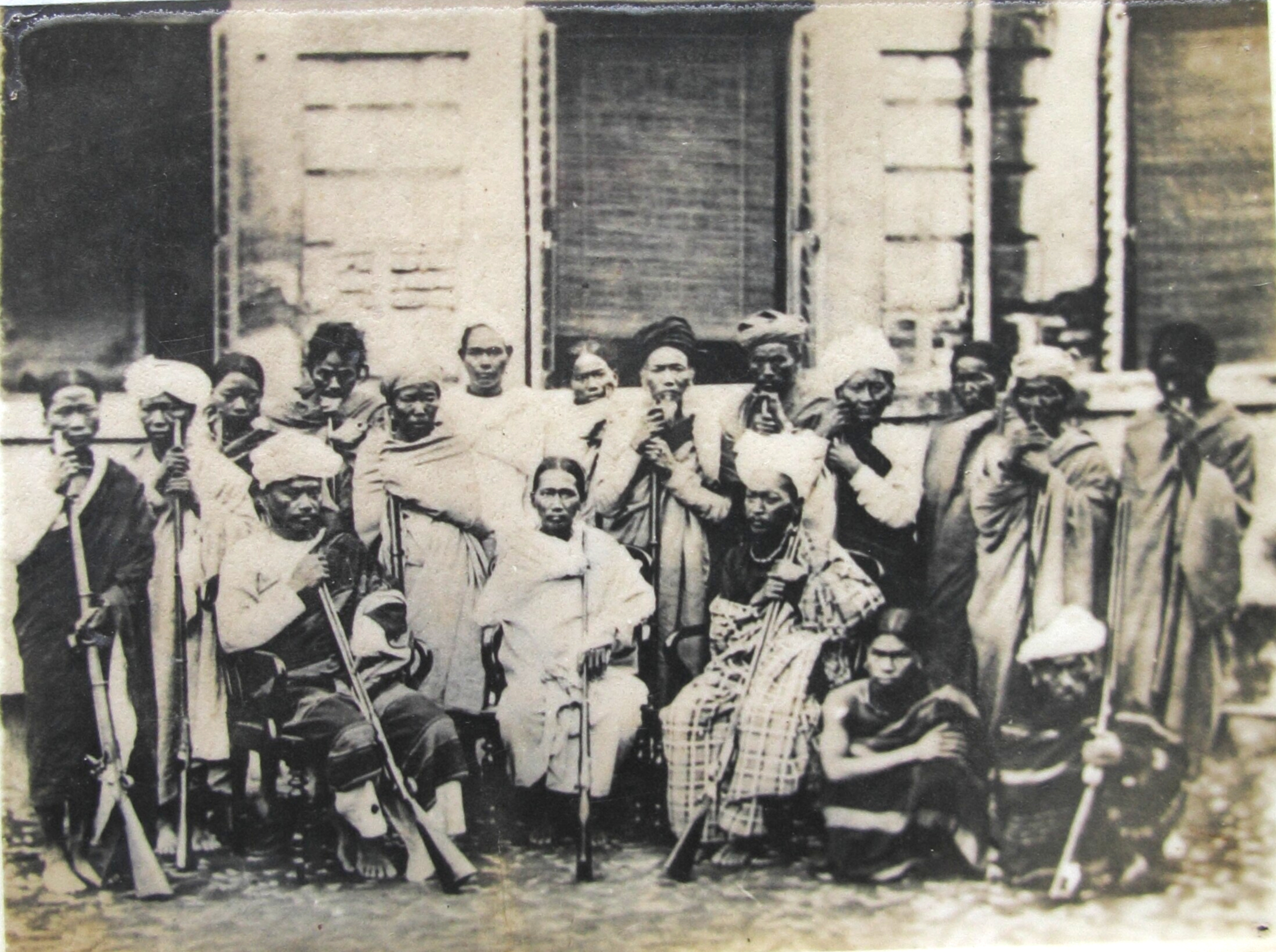
- Map of Lushai Tribes distributed in Mizoram Map of settlements of Lushai chiefs 1890 Lushai Chiefs in 1872 at Calcutta
- Status: Tribal Chiefdoms
- Capital: None; Fort Aijal (Aizawl)
- Common languages: Kuki-Chin languages
- Religion: Mizo religion Christianity (after 1891)
- Demonym: Mizos
- Government: Stateless (before 1890); British protectorate (after 1890)
- Lal
  - ??–1954: Numerous
- Historical era: Precolonial era; Colonial era
  - Immigration from Kabaw Valley: c. 1540
  - Settlement in Lushai Hills: 1724
  - Lushai Expedition: 1871-1872
  - Establishment of British Lushai Hills: 1888-1889
  - Abolishment of Chieftainship: 1954
- Currency: None; British Indian rupee (after 1890)
Preceded by	Succeeded by
Zo Tribes	British rule in the Lushai Hills
- Today part of: Mizoram
- Aizawl became a capital under British rule. Christianity came under the continuation of Chieftainship under British rule.

The Mizo people of the Lushai hills historically organized under hereditary or seniority-based tribal chieftainships. The chieftain system persisted among the various clans and tribes from the precolonial era through to the British colonial period and Indian independence briefly. The Mizo Union advocated for abolishing chieftainship in Mizoram. The chieftainships of Mizoram were eventually disbanded with the Assam-Lushai District ("Acquisition of Chief's Rights") Act in 1954.

== Society of Mizo Chiefdoms ==
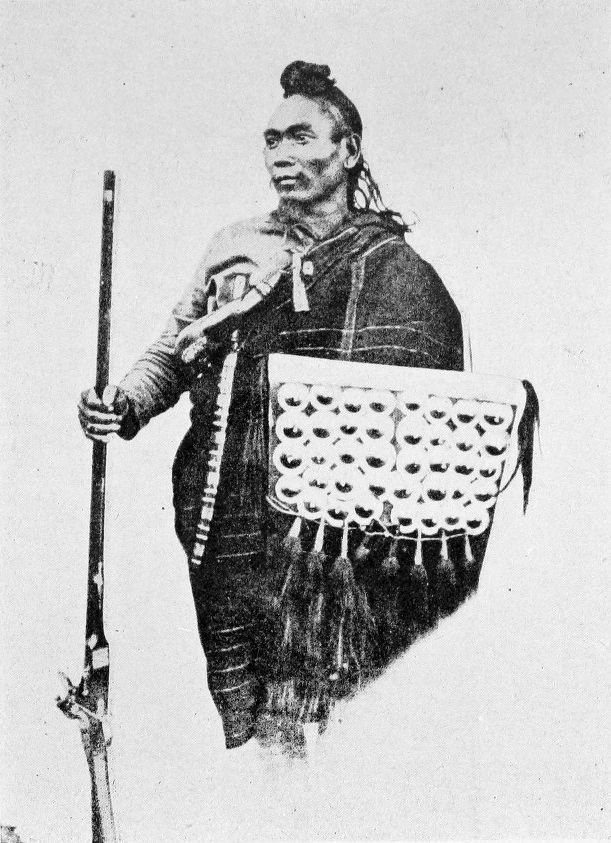
Fanai Chief Zakapa depicted by John Shakespear.

In the administration, the chief would cooperate with various individuals to achieve his duties. Among the most important of these individuals were the chief's elders, also known as Lal upate or upa. The chief could choose who to appoint to this position and how many individuals could fit this capacity. The elders did not possess the ability to question decisions or criticise the chief and typically held meetings at the Chief's house while drinking zû (transl. rice beer). An upa who became favoured by the chief for their conduct would be granted permission to set up a hamlet near the village known as a khawper. Upa who are given headmen positions act as lesser chiefs known as Belrawh mualkil and if they're granted privileges like sachhiah (transl. meat tax), they are known as sangal khawnghrang. The most important upa is known as upamin and is perceived as the chief's deputy. The upas would also help the chief to adjudicate cases in which they would receive a portion of the salam (transl. fine of the losing party).

The brothers of the chief would also enjoy prestige by association if they did not rule any village. They were exempted from paying the rice paddy tax known as fathang. They would be given the first choice on choosing plots for jhumming and cultivation.

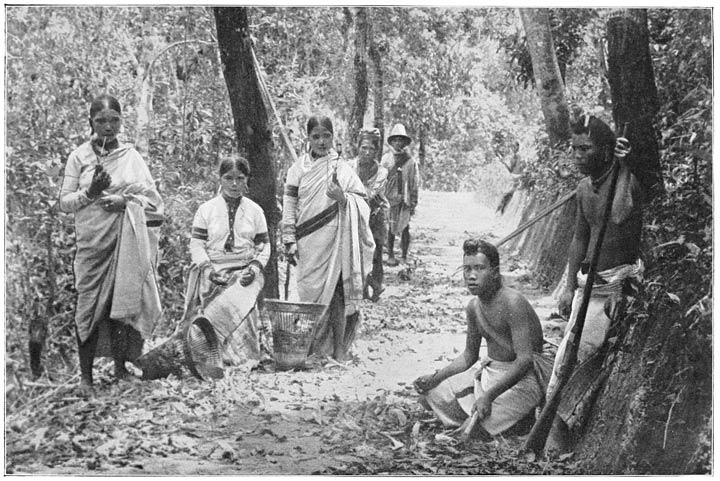
Lushai and Poi villagers on the path to the Jhum field.

Influential cultivators known as ramhuals would also get the right to choose cultivation plots before other people, although they would have to give double fathang. These individuals were appointed by the chief on account of their agricultural output in order to collect larger paddy tributes. Ramhuals would select a hill suitable for jhumming (slash-and-burn cultivation) in the year. This process allows the chief to make the first choice over his jhum plot. Ramhuals were second in the privilege to choose their jhum plots, often reserving the best and paying a larger paddy tax. Zalen were families exempted from paying the paddy-tribute due to their specific obligation to help the chief if the food supply declined.

The village blacksmith was known as thirdeng. This craft and skillset would be passed down hereditarily. One of the village blacksmiths would be chosen by the chief to as a personal blacksmith. The chief's blacksmith would take part in the administration with the chief and elders. Their responsibilities would include repairing tools for agriculture and other daily work. Due to this, they could also claim Thirdengsa, which is a small share of any wild animal killed by the village hunting party. The thirdeng would get remuneration by being given a basket of paddy from each household in the village. The thirdeng would also have a separate workshop known as a pum. A unique social function of the pum outside of blacksmithing was the storing of heads of enemies brought from war.

The puithiam was the priest of the village and had authority over rituals and spiritual matters. A sadawt was a private priest for the chief and was granted the ability to be shared by multiple chiefs of the same clan. The sadawts were in charge of festivals and ceremonies with knowledge of the practice of witchcraft. The sadawt typically has an assistant known as a Tlahpawi. A Tlahpawi was typically a friend of the chief. Their most common task would be scraping the skin of pigs with bamboo to file off the hair. A bawlpu was assigned to cure sicknesses and procure medicine. The bawlpu would typically prescribe animal sacrifice, which would be brought with debt or offered if already owned. The incantations used by bawlpu were closely guarded and were only imparted to the next prospective bawlpu either due to their inability to carry out their tasks or being close to death.

The val upa played an important role in traditional Mizo society. They were not appointed by the chief but elected by people based on reputation and merit towards community contribution. Their powers included managing all matters with children and young men. They operated as spokesmen to the chief on matters pertaining to bachelors in the [[zawlbuk|zawlbûk]]. They also regulated and assented to decisions made by young men and opinionated common policy.

The Tlangau was a village crier. Their responsibility was to proclaim the chief's orders and assign what tasks or work were to be done the next day. The crier was repaid with a basket of rice from each family. The crier would often essentially function as a servant of the chief with little status in the chiefdom. While assault was punished in Mizo chiefdoms, hitting the crier for bearing bad news or tedious work was an exception with no fines.

The bawis were slaves in Mizo society under the Bawi system. There were typically four categories of slaves: Inpui Chhung Bawi, Inhrang Bawi, Chemsen Bawi and Tukluh Bawi. Inpui Chhung Bawi means a slave within a big house. This term was applied to individuals in poverty, sickness or distress who sought protection under the chief. An Inpui Chhung Bawi was expected to work within their physical capacity but would gain privileges under the chief regarding food, rice-beer and meat taxes. After being married for three years, a bawi would be considered an Inhrang Bawi (transl. separate house slave). A Chemsen Bawi, which means a red knife slave, was anyone who had killed someone in a village and had sought sanctuary under the chief. A Chemsen Bawi was not obligated to work under the chief but the chief would assume paternal responsibility for the murderer's children as punishment for the criminal. Tukluh Bawi were slaves captured from war with neighbouring tribes through raids and battles. These slaves were relatively free and were allowed to live in separate houses. Mizo customs provided that these Tukluh Bawi would purchase their freedom by paying the chief a Mithun or an equivalent.

The khawchhiar is the village writer. This occupation emerged under the British administration and the influence of literacy with Christian missionaries' efforts. The khawchhiar is appointed by the superintendent and represents the British administration. Their responsibilities typically consisted of statistic registers, listing of village houses, rostering of coolie labour and supervising the list of guns in the village. All khawchhiar were exempt from coolie labour and house tax.

A Thangchhuahpa was a privileged status in the Lushai chiefdoms. To attain this status there were two distinct ways. One way was an individual was expected to throw numerous feasts known as khuangchawi for the whole community, which would make them known as Inlama Thangchhuahpa. Another way is to hunt and kill a specific number of wild animals according to customs and practice to become known as a ramlama thangchhuahpa. The animals typically required include a wild mithun, barking deer, bear, wild boar and an elephant. The killing of the animal was accompanied with an Ai ceremony (with the puithiam) to accompany him in death one day. The ramlama thangchhuahpa did not have all the privileges such as windows and shelves or the special cloth. For their prestige, these individuals would be appointed as upas, the elders who would guide the chiefs. Privileges of being a thangchhuah include a special pattern of striped clothes to denote their status, the right to build a window in their house, erect a shelf by their bed and a beam on their veranda. These privileges extended to a thangchhuah's wife and their children, who had the right to wear a thangchhuah cloth. In Lushai animism, a thangchhuah was believed to enter pialrâl or heaven straightaway.

A Pasalṭha was known as a hunter or warrior in Mizo society. Their roles were significant and central to the security of the village. Villages with many pasalṭha held more privilege and power, which would also deter raids. A pasalṭha held privilege in Mizo society and were typically granted the first sips of zû during a drinking ceremony with the chief. Under Chief Vanhnuailiana, his famous settlement of Tualte consisted of 12 famous pasalṭha. These were Vana Pa, Chawngduma, Keihawla, Tawkthiala, Zampuimanga, Chhunkeuva, Darbuta, Chalkhenga, Darruma, Darphawka, Darkuala and Zabiaka. Another famous Pasalṭha was Khuangchera who participated in the Lushai Rising.

=== Village Layout ===
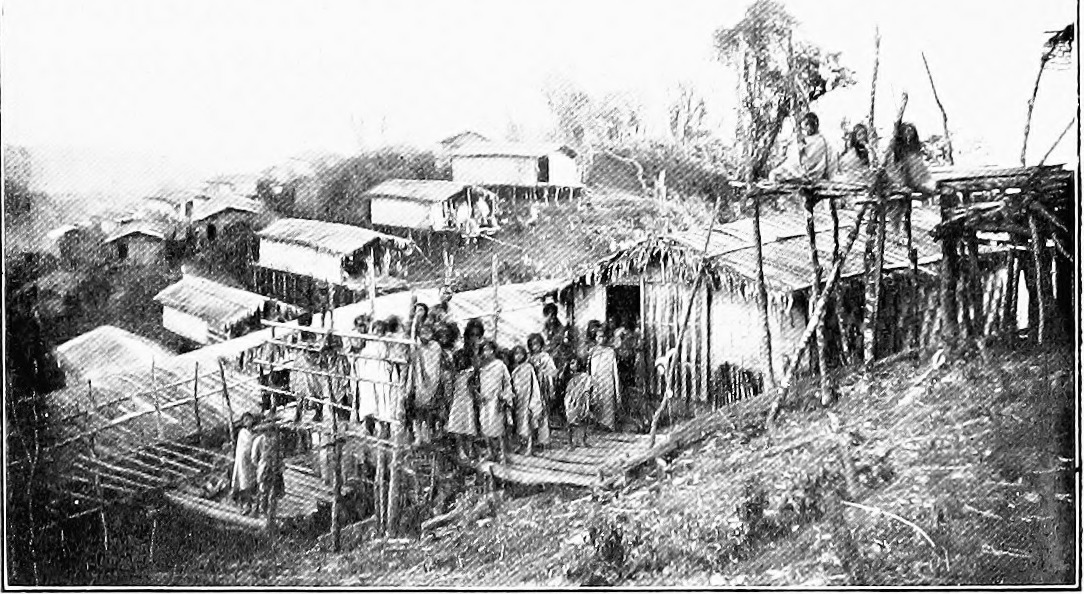
Mizo village built on hillside and hilltops

Mizo villages were typically built on hills for fortification purposes from other warring tribes. To protect from high winds, many structures would be built on a slope on the hill as protection. Houses would not be built in a valley or the base of a hill, but raised three-four feet off the ground as protection from wild animals and draining of water. A house would be built of materials such as timber for walls, bamboo matting for floor and thatched grass for roofing. Each village was surrounded with a line of stockades consisting of wood and bamboo spikes on the outside. The village would have two-three principal gates made of large slabs of timbers. A block house would be built at each gateway and other locations to spot enemy parties. The village youth and men of the zawlbuk would be responsible for upkeep and repair of the stockade. Villages widely varied in sizes with the smaller villages reaching 300 households and bigger villages having as much as 3000 houses.

Houses would be arranged in rows along the ridges or facing each other with streets running between them. The chief's house was traditionally built in the centre of the village with a zawlbuk to be constructed nearby. Another house for the upas was made close to the chief's house. No person in a village was permitted to build a house higher than the chief's.

A standard house was traditionally not built to last due to the Mizos being a migratory tribe for their jhumming practices. A house was raised 3–4 feet off the ground and held with bamboo or saplings as posts. For the roof they used leaves of local trees known di, thilsek, siallu, laisua. Walls would be made of timber and bamboo would be used for floor matting. Outside of the house was a platform known as leikapui which was treated as a resort for the family. Sometimes a screen will be added for shade so that women can weave and stitch.

A standard house would have decks with hollow basins designed for rice husking at the front, which would be worked with long wooden pestles. At the back of the house was a small enclosed deck serving as a storeroom. Interiors were fitted with a hearth fitted with mud or flat stones. Above this hearth was a suspended larger wooden square of grains, herbs, jerky and cured bacon. Next to the hearth was the main bed known as a Khumpui where the parents of the household sleep. This was respected and only the parents could sit or lie on it. Young unmarried men would typically sleep in the zawlbuk, a bachelor's barrack. A final section was also cleared to store water with bamboo pipes and pots, where individuals could take a bath behind a bamboo wall in a corner of the house. Windows were not built unless an individual had performed the khuangchawi ceremony, a public feast given by chiefs to well-to-do Mizos, or it was believed to bring bad fortune.

==== Chief's House ====
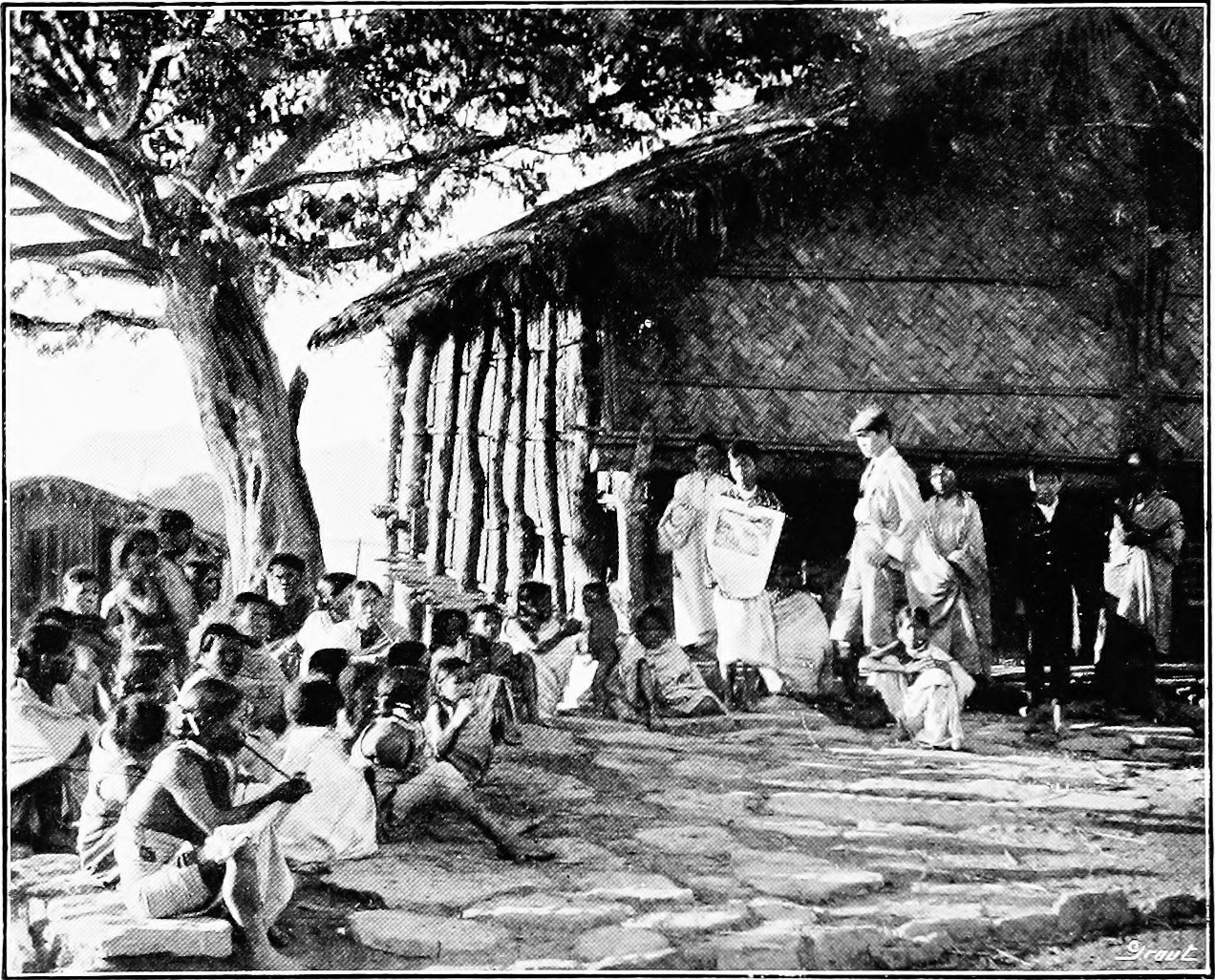
Mizo villagers sitting in the lal mual outside a Zawlbuk.

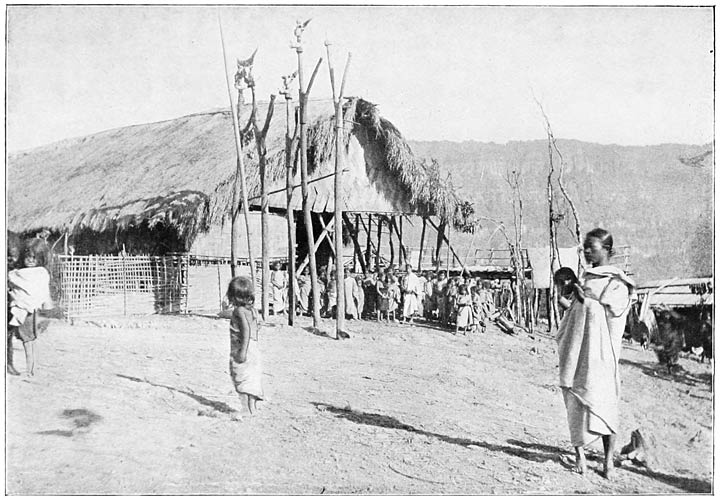
Chief's House in a Lushai Village

The chief's house is generally situated in the heart of the village. A large space in front of the house was the village square known as Lal mual. The chief's house was built to accommodate various resources and activities, often with a community effort. The chief's house would consist of a front verandah with a wooden mortar for husking rice known as a sumhmun. Several rooms known as vanlung were established as slave quarters for families captured during raids. Through the vanlung you would enter the spacious area known as dawvan. The dawvan held a fireplace and was known to be the meeting room for discussion, dispute settlement and administrative work.

==== Zawlbuk ====
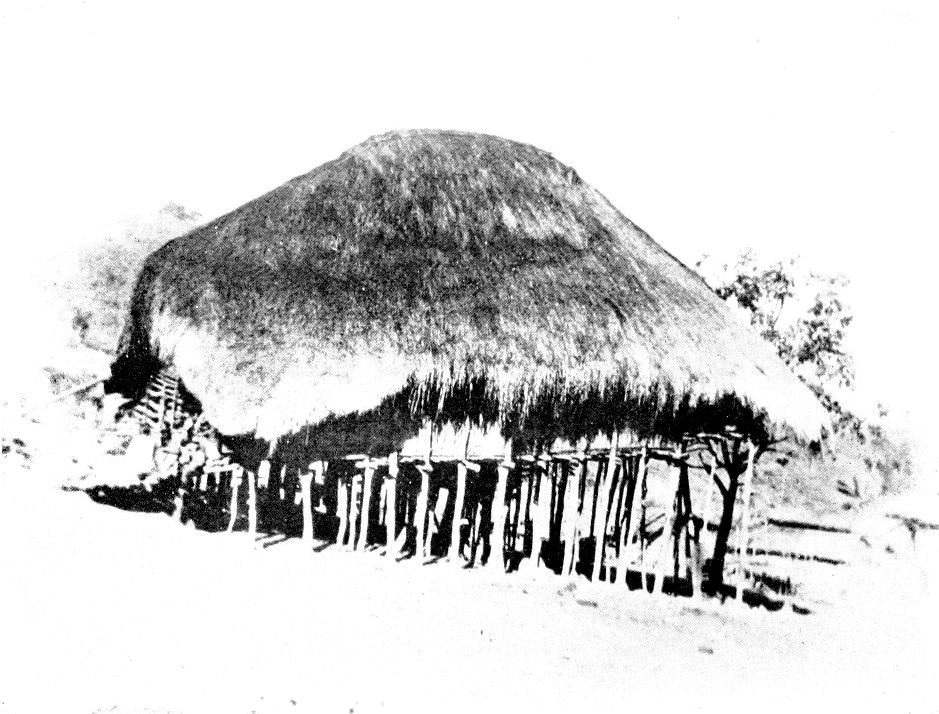
A Zawlbuk to be used by the village's young men.

A dormitory for bachelors known as a zawlbuk would be provided to the young men of the village. The zawlbuk would have young men concentrated in a single building for emergencies and quick decisions. Responsibilities of the men in zawlbuks could include organising hunting parties, warfare and raiding missions, or cohesive policies decided by the chief. The boys would be divided into two groups based on age. The young men were known as tlangvals while the boys were known as Thingfawm Naupang. The boys typically did the firewood duties alongside washing clothes, doing errands and carrying materials for grave preparations.

A zawlbuk was built and operated by the village community. To access the zawlbuk, which was a raised building, there were logs on the uphill end. The zawlbuk would have a large fireplace or hearth in the centre, which would be continually lit throughout the night and day. Beside the hearth was a large open space for wrestling and dancing.

Villages that were larger or more diverse in terms of clans would possess multiple zawlbuks in subdivisions known as veng. Each veng would possess one zawlbuk.

=== Legal system ===
Before the arrival of British legal doctrine and laws handling offences under the superintendent, the Mizo people operated under a separate, unfixed legal system. The chiefs would have customary practices and rules.

In the case of murder, the family of the victim has the liberty to take revenge and kill the murderer. This led to a practice in which a murderer would run to the Chief's house for protection. By clinging to the foundation post of the Chief's house, the perpetrator achieves 'Lal sutpui pawm which binds a chief to protect the murderer. This protection would ward away revenge-seekers due to fears of confronting the chief. If the perpetrator seeks out the chief, they become a lifetime slave to the chief. For other serious crimes such as rape, the offender would have a portion of nose and ear cut off. This disfigurement would become an emblem to the offender's crime allowing the villagers to treat them as an outcast.

A special procedure for the chief was available known as kut silna which means the washing of hands. This would allow a chief to take revenge on any individual who captured or detained them during war or a raid. This was a customary practice approved by all the chiefs and no higher authority held them questionable by it.

Due to lack of locks and other features of security, traditional homes were unguarded and a wooden pole was placed at the door to show the home was empty. Punishment for theft led to punishments known as sial and salam. Sial was a fine of the biggest domestic animal known as Mithun, while a salam was a swine. Both of these would go to the chief and other elders for a feast.

The punishments for crimes were expressed through the ornamentation of the chief's spear. A piece of red cloth on the spear signified "blood", while a cane attached signifies "beating". A capsicum on the spear indicates the punishment will be hot and pungent. Two pieces of bamboo tied crosswise is a demand for blackmail with the number of mithuns demanded counted on the bends of the bamboo. If the cross is charred or burned, great urgency or danger is denoted.

=== Economy ===
Historically, Mizo chiefdoms were based on subsistence, with very few economic activities outside of this range. However, historically the tribes and chiefdoms had been linked to ancient trade routes connecting Yunnan with the Bay of Bengal, which passed close to the mountain ranges of Mizoram. Later on, chiefs would utilize tributes from subjects of neighbouring kingdoms in the plains through force and demand regular payments. They would also have traders known as karbari. Karbari, meaning 'men of business' , typically were associated with Mizo chiefs in south Mizoram. They functioned as a bridge between foreigners and the chiefs in procuring goods. They were skilled in jungle routes, customs of the clans and knew a bit of Mizo or communicated in Bengali as a lingua franca. Under the British, the chiefs traded and established bazaars normally in agreement to protect the business interests of the merchants.

==== Taxation ====
Regular payment by villagers would typically be made with a share of their harvest known as a fathang or paddy tribute. Animals procured through hunting were bound to a due known as sachhiah, which was the animal's left foreleg. If the animal was already dead upon collection, it was exempt from sachhiah. Failure to pay the sachhiah would lead to a fine. Procurement of salt springs would have an entitlement known as chikhurchhiah if it fell within his territory. Khuaichhiah is the collection of portions of honey collected by villagers of the chief's land and territory. If the honey was collected by one person the chief would claim half, for any other group, the honey was divided with the chief in count. If a villager sold a mithun or disposed of it to a person in another village then a tax known as Sechhiah would be in effect. Sechhiah consisted of paying a young pig to the chief. This was argued to show the chief's possession of all village assets and property. Lal Insak is less of a tax but a labour quota used by chiefs. It consists of exacting free labour form the villagers to construct the chief's house. Chiefs also held the authority to demand property from their villagers without backlash. The only resolution for such an injustice would be for a villager to move to another village. Mizo people were traditionally allowed to freely migrate to other villages, which Parry argued was a check on the arbitrary powers of a cruel chief. In reality the lack of roads, rough terrain, and the chief's seizure of property for anyone who was migrating made it difficult for individuals to make on foot journeys to other villages. Another risk is that neighbouring villages may reject him even another chief if they hold good relations with the former chief. A.G McCall describes that many items and other treasures "often found their way to the chief's house by shameless distraint". The complete seizure of all property of a misbehaving subject was known as ram which forced a family to migrate to another village known as pem. Vanlaldika argues that pem functions less on people's choices but the chief's choices.

==== Land ====
Land or ram was controlled by the chief. It operated both as communal ownership and private peasant ownership. It was unlike other forms of land ownership in that there was no right to ownership or right to transfer. The chief would claim his own land known as Keimahi ram and entitle himself to economic privileges. These privileges would also be distributed to blacksmiths, headsmen and priests as a feudal resembling system.

The chiefdoms in the central Chin Hills had a two-category land classification system. Namely Bul ram (private land) and Kland ram (community land). Bul ram gave the individual the right to cultivate, forage, hunt, and customary law of a right to inheritance.

==== Currency ====
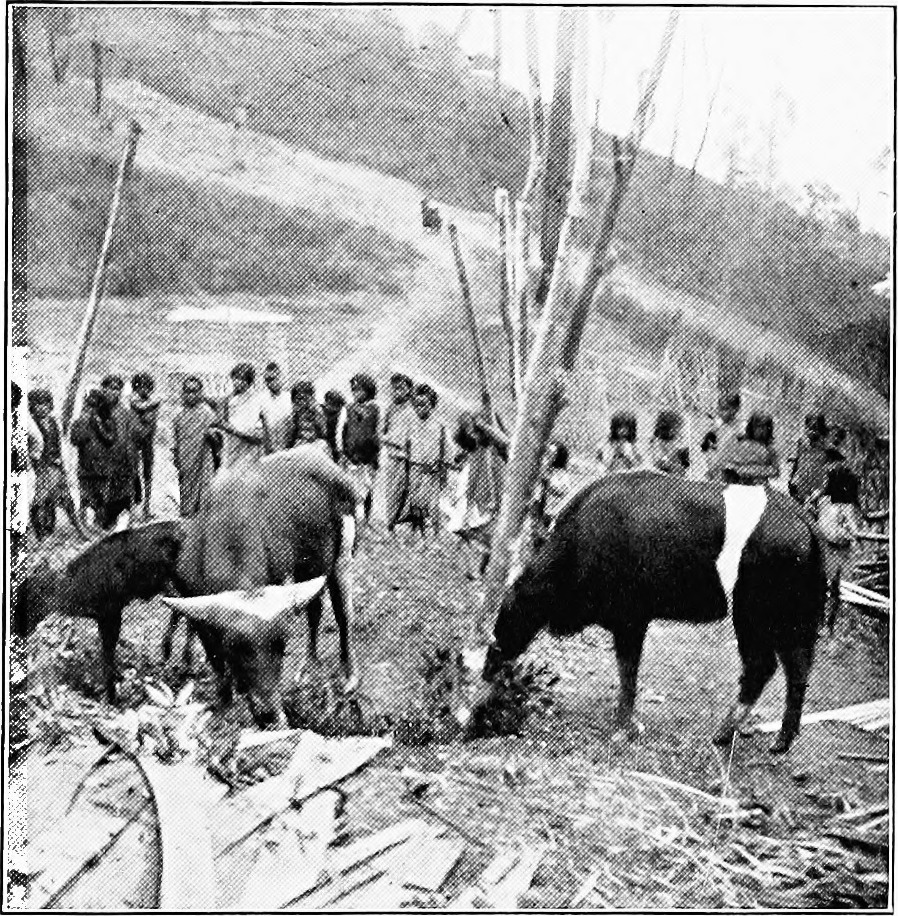
The mithun of the Lushai Hills villagers.

Mizo chiefdoms and villages engaged in the barter system. Larger transactions required a medium of exchange known as 'mithun (tame bison). Mithun would function as a measure of wealth for the chiefs. In the legal system of Mizo chiefdoms, mithun would also function as the currency of compensation or fines for offences. Elephant tusks were also an acceptable chiefdom currency. While using a barter system, the Mizo chiefs possessed a system of units of sorting by weight. The number of buckets varied in size and shape for commodities such as rice. There were fawng (U-shaped), Dawran (lengthy), tam em (big) and empai (medium).

==== Raiding and slavery ====
Raiding formed an important part of the economy regarding trade and financing. Raids were formed with a coalition of chiefs against a more prosperous chief. Guns were highly valued in raids and held as trophies by chiefs. Raids, in general, were associated with a chief's funeral custom or the marriage of his daughters. A successful raid would oversee the looting of valuables, men and women. Individuals taken during raids would become slaves of the chief and traded for profits. Reasons for raiding have been varied. In certain cases it would be a form of enrichment to take resources from the plains or other chiefs. At certain times, a chief may conduct raids to collect tributes from neighbouring entities and establish influence around them. The nature of Mizo chiefdoms also relied heavily on manpower, which meant that procuring more labour could be achieved with the capturing of individuals. Women and concubines were also signs of prestige for a chief and his influence. Raids were also a way for the Lushais to procure rare resources such as steel. The practice of headhunting is attributed to burial traditions associated with chiefs.

Men would be valued upon their age and physical qualities, usually amounting to three mithuns. Female slaves were valued depending on age, beauty and physical fitness, usually amounting to five mithuns. Good-looking female slaves would typically become concubines to chiefs. Chiefs were also responsible for the marriage of their slaves, which increased demand for female slaves. Tribal women would not only meet this demand but also Bengali women working on tea estates.

Raiding would typically not consist of open formations. Most Lushai war parties functioned on a code of ambushing. Auspicious times would be selected for good luck in their operation. An example is if the crescent moon has a star on its left side it was regarded a constellation of a head being carried. Upon killing of their enemies and targets the victor had to put his feet on the corpse or stand near it with a victory shout. The victor repeats their own name three times and sings a bawhhla (battle song). This was due to the belief that the spirit of the slain would become a servant in the afterlife upon doing so.

After the proceedings of victory, the heads would be collected, if the journey back home was considered too far then the scalp of the head was taken instead with the hair attached. The war party were not allowed to return with the heads in daytime as it was considered a taboo. After dusk when courtship would occur the war party would enter the village and celebrate with bawhhla and firing shots to announce their victory and procured heads. The village maidens also would make Arkeziak a white spun cotton yarn not boiled with rice and hence tied around the neck, ankle or wrists of the warriors. The wealthy elites of the chiefdoms would give rewards of precious stones instead. Looted objects could also be purchased by family members and relatives. After the welcoming ceremony the heads would be kept in the thirdengsa (blacksmiths forge).

==== Riverine trade and bazaar ====
The forest offered resources that Lushai chiefdoms took advantage of in trading. Elephant hides and bones, which were available in the Lushai Hills, fetched demand from Sylhet merchants under the Mughal Empire. This was due to the hide being used in making shields for infantry and cavalry of local kingdoms and Mughal officials. The Elephant bones were used in making luxury goods or parts of swords. For this reason, Lushai chiefdoms used ivory as their treasury measurement.

Lalchukla is the first recorded chief to come into contact with Bengali merchants in Sylhet who sold goods such as rice, salt, rubber, sulphur and flint glass in 1838. Lalchukla also raided Kachu Bari, which was attributed to a headhunting tradition for his father's funeral. However, British inquiry revealed that Lalchukla took revenge with a raid on the plains merchants who had 'cheated and beaten up' Lushai traders. An issue with the proliferation of tea estates led to a conflict with elephant hunting traditions and subsequent trading of the Lushai chiefdoms with the plains. Furthermore, the British Raj's policy to establish elephant kheda competed with and declined the value of Lushai ivory. This would become a motivator for raiding of tea estates aside from a fear of British encroachment.The chiefdoms would typically begin to sell products such as rubber, ginger, ivory and elephant bones and purchase newer products such as tobacco and clothes.

Mizo chiefs also cooperated in the Bepari Bazaar on Sylhet and Kassalong. Bengali traders set up a marketplace in Changsil on the Tlawng River. In the winter months, the Lushai tribes sold jhum products such as big fish and crude rubber. Certain merchants were also allowed to operate in Lushai chieftain territory by offering protection. These merchants offered rent as a permanent income for chieftains. T.H Lewin, superintendent of the Chittagong Hill Tracts, supported the development of trade marts and bazaars along the Lushai frontier.

The Lushai Hills possessed naturally occurring forests of rubber trees. This was attributed to the heavy rainfall and soil salubrity that helped the rubber species' vegetation. The rubber trade flourished as Lushai chiefdoms tapped rubber from the trees, providing it to increasing demands. This Indian rubber was used for products such as wire, pencil, and sulphur and for critical infrastructure purposes. Government markets to handle the rubber market were established in 1868, with regular markets following along British outposts in 1871–1872. The Mizos failed to realize the market price of rubber. Any Mizo could tap rubber with the permission of their chief. Due to frequent migrations under the practice of jhumming, rubber trees were not replanted. Global rubber prices fell in April 1876 which affected the profit margins of merchants purchasing rubber from the Lushai chiefdoms. Rubber was traded directly for one mound to a quarter mound of salt. Later on Lushai traders travelled beyond bazaars in Lushai territory to Cachar and sell rubber at more competitive prices. Rubber was ultimately depleted due to lack of management and wasteful overlapping coinciding with desperate trading for famine relief. The British recorded that in 1898, there was no trace of rubber forests in the Lushai Hills.

The increase in trade in Anglo-Lushai relations led to the adoption of currency in rupees. Lushai villagers no longer converted excess crops into rice beer and sold them to generate a profit. Three bazaars were established at Tipaimukh, Sonai, Sairang and Changsil after the Lushai expedition. Traders from Sylhet and Chakma investors provided capital for the marketplaces and bazaars in Lushai territory. The increase in markets led to fewer hostile actions, such as raiding and plundering. The Mizos used their coins and savings to purchase cattle from the plains during the winter months.

The Sonai and Changsil bazaars were within the territory of Suikpuilal, who taxed the bazaar unfavourably before readjusting with the advice of the Deputy Commissioner of Cachar. The Sonai bazaar provided market access for the western chiefs and was patronised by Khalkam. The Changsil bazaar was patronised mainly by Suikpilal. The Tipaimukh bazaar was within the territory of Poiboi. It was located in the eastern Lushai Hills and was accessed by southern chiefs as well. However, Suikpilal also wished to move the Changsil bazaar with the intention of depriving southern chiefs of market access. In 1875, Changsil oversaw 18 shops, with three shops at Tipaimukh and two shops at Tuirial.

The bazaars were opened with the approval of the chiefs, who permitted Bengali traders and merchants to open their own shops. The chiefs were obligated to protect the traders from any threat and collect rent money from the traders. Establishing inner-Lushai marketplaces alleviated British fears of the uncertainty of Lushai traders or raiders arriving on British land. The rules around the riverine bazaars stated that subjects of Lushai chiefs could not trade with the markets of another chief' or beyond their chief's assigned market.

Each bazaar had its own issues that wouldn't allow it to last through to British annexation. Southern chiefs threatened the Changsil bazaar due to Suikpilal's gatekeeping of access. The Sonai bazaar was threatened by Eastern chiefs. The Tipaimukh bazaar was threatened by Paite and Sukte chiefs in Manipur and the Chin Hills. Poiboi failed to protect Tipaimukh from raiding chiefs such as Lengkam and Chunglena, leading to merchants closing their businesses for a whole year. Poiboi took the initiative in making deals to share rent revenue with the eastern chiefs and made the offending chiefs apologize to the British for the misbehaviour. The elders of the Lushai chiefs gathered and pleaded for merchants to return to Tipaimukh bazaar, which was granted after they paid a fine to compensate the traders.

Poiboi looted the Sonai bazaar, and the salt held by the merchants was confiscated by force. The British temporarily stationed a guard of twelve sepoys, after which the merchants closed their shops and left on withdrawal of the force. On the other hand, the Changsil bazaar was looted by their patron chief, Suikpilal. The looting of goods and cash held by merchants led to merchants closing shop and leaving the Lushai Hills. The British punished Suikpilal with a large fine for his misconduct. After the death of Suikpilal, his descendants charged excessive rental rates and extortion. Tipaimukh bazaar under Chief Khalkam had no fixed rent rate, which led to frequent disagreements. Merchants frequently closed shops in the bazaar to the point that only two shops remained open in 1884. British officials attempted numerous times to fix new contracts between the two parties. The deputy commissioner of Cachar even suggested a subsidy system which would be deducted and penalized for misconduct with the bazaars. The government rejected this idea, citing it was unsuccessful with other tribes such as Aka, Bhutia and Dafla.

Tipaimukh bazaar continued to be threatened by Sukte raids from the Chin and Manipur hills. Poiboi rejected the British's effort to provide security to the bazaar by citing that the action didn't represent his sovereignty. The withdrawal of the force led to the complete abandonment of the bazaar. Sonai bazaar had merchants return in 1889, but the interests of both Khalkam and Poiboi to collect rent frustrated merchants who left the Sonai bazaar permanently despite the profitable rubber trade. Changsil Bazaar survived the longest with no British security force stationed, as Suikpilal and his descendants prevented foreign raids. The closure is attributed to the fact that the Changsil bazaar declined due to the depletion of rubber from overlapping. The merchants found more profit in Silchar and British territories, which led to its closure in 1890.

=== Socio-Cultural Traditions ===
==== Tlawmngaihna ====
Due to mautam and recurring famines, a communitarian philosophy known as tlawmngaihna emerged in the Mizo tribes. Ideals of honesty, courage, self-discipline, mutual help, and readiness to organize were stipulated in this philosophy.

==== Sa Aih Ceremony ====
The Mizos also had a ceremony related to the remains of hunted animals. Whether these animals were hunted in self-defense or to procure meat a ceremony was done over them. This ceremony was compulsory if a Pasalṭha managed to kill a sa hrang (a large animal) such as an elephant, a tiger or a wild boar. While a barking deer was smaller it was considered auspicious to perform the ceremony. The ceremony had no time limit and could be done immediately or delayed for several days. The ceremony required the mithun or boar to be killed and feasted upon by the village. If the Pasalṭha couldn't afford to undertake such an expense, then the ceremony was excused.

The ceremony consisted of drinking zu (rice beer) all day with music and dance. The mithun or boar would be killed in the evening. There were no special rites except an uttering of an incantation by an elder. The hunter would have Thing-sia (castanopsis tribuloides) planted in front of their house. If the hunter had performed the ceremony several times with many boughs planted then the boughs would be tied together and attached with creeper plants. The skulls of their animals would also be displayed on their verandah and posts along their house. These skulls would also be decorated on the graves of the hunters which were turned into monuments dedicated to their successful prestige.

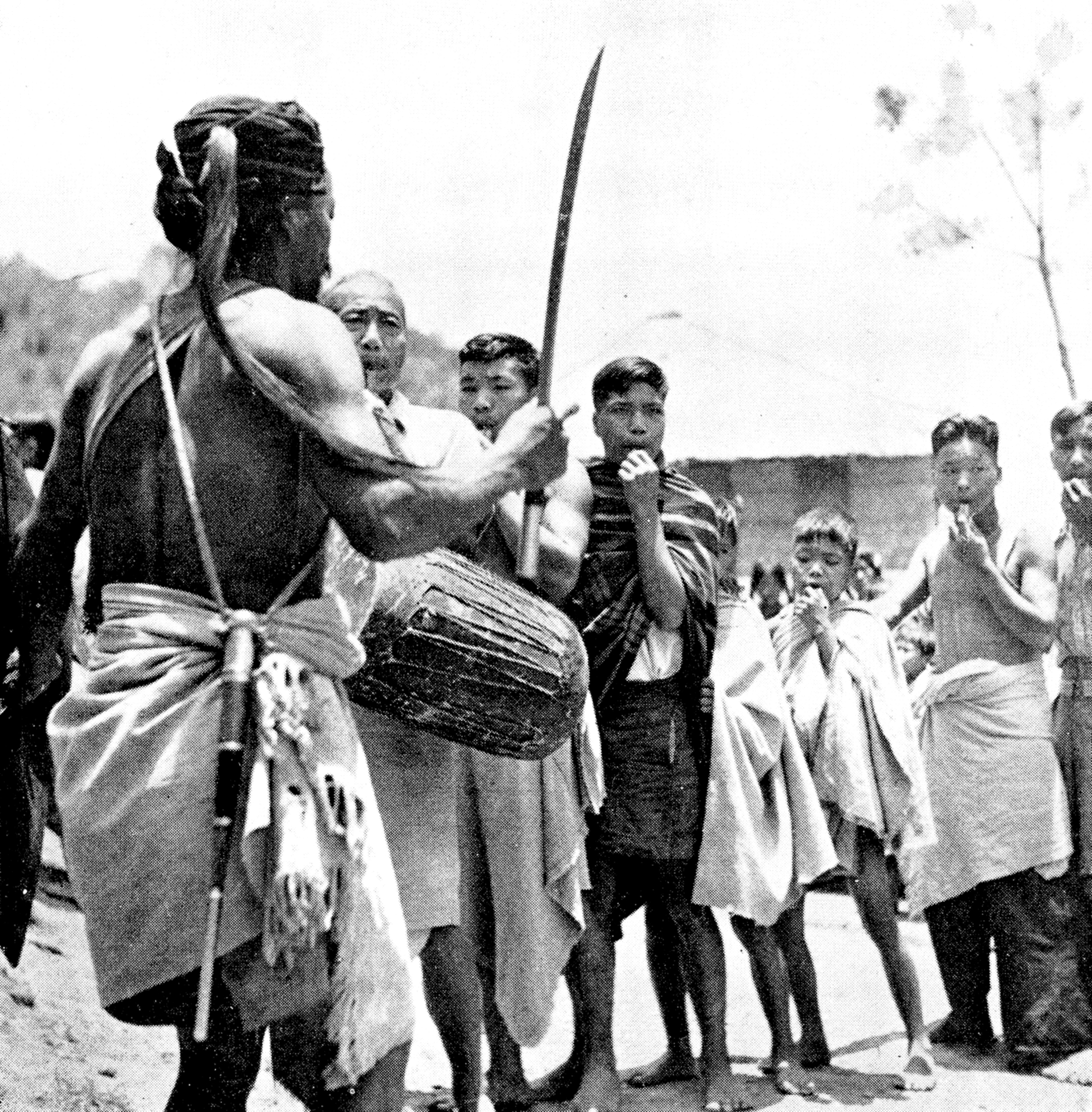
The performance of an Ai ceremony after successfully hunting a tiger for it to serve the hunter in the afterlife.

The tiger Sa Aih ceremony was considered the most sacred. A tiger was known as sakei but it was taboo and inauspicious to utter the true name out loud. A tiger was considered a khuavang a guardian spirit. A tiger would know all the sins of an individual and upon its judgement choose to harm or spare an individual. A tiger was not allowed to be hunted due to its status as a guardian spirit. For this reason, Mizo culture did not allow individuals to admit they killed a tiger but lie that it had been struck by lightning moving horizontally. A lion's carcass was never taken home. Among the Lai tribes, the death of a tiger was mourned.

On the Sa Aih ceremony of a tiger, the killer of the tiger was not allowed to sleep. On the day of the ceremony no activities such as farming and hunting were permitted. It was believed that other tigers would attack and maul anyone who ventured into the jungle. The hunter would hold a cotton spindle to twist threads together; it would be rubbed and spun to swing and hit the tiger's corpse. This would occur three times. The man would also carry a pipe full of ash and blow hard to spill the ashes on the tiger. The tiger would then be mocked and scoffed at by being fed a pebble and the hunter eating a boiled egg. The tiger's head would be struck with his sword and the tiger would be shot at point blank. This was believed to scare other tigers who would see the bravery of the hunter mistreating the tiger. If the tiger had mauled or wounded a human before its eyes were gouged out with a stick. The hunters would then end the ceremony and retired to the chiefs house as the carcass was thrown out.

==== Nula-rim (Traditional Courtship) ====
In traditional Mizo custom, young men would leave around 6-7pm to the house of the girl they were courting to sit down and talk. Commitment would entail the young man suggesting to help each other more in farm work of jhumming to prepare for marriage. Cooperating with farm work would allow the girl to accept or reject her suitor based on their conduct and work ethic. To guard against false defamation, a boy known as a puarak observes the couple's courting as a definitive witness for sexual relations. On the puarak's testimony, if sexual relations were declared, then the girl can't claim compensation for defamation if it has been publicized. The nature of courting in general did not hold penalties for sexual relations unless the girl got pregnant. In the case of pregnancy during courtship the man responsible pays a sawn man.While men sneak to meet their courtships at the girl's house, they will have to avoid being caught by their parents, or else they will be forced to pay khumpuikaiman or marry the woman.

Once successful and committed, a palai would be sent to work out marriage terms. A palai is an envoy typically selected from the boy's family for the purpose of marriage discussion. The discussion would entail the bride price and the date of marriage. Unlike a dowry system; a bride price would simply be paid to sell the girl into the boy's family. Traditionally a bride price would be placed at two mithuns, while a chief's daughter would demand or fetch as high as ten mithuns. Physical intimacy was permitted upon marriage agreement in a tradition known as zawl-puan-phah which means preparing the lover's bed. If the marriage does not take place after the consummation of the relationship, then the boy is fined four mithuns. Typical marriage age did not have much age difference with men at 22 and women at 19.

==== Marriage ====
Marriage typically entailed a feast where the bride's father would slaughter a mithun, and half were given to the groom's family. The bride would redistribute a portion of the bride price, and a special sum known as pusum was given to the bride's favourite uncle. The uncle receiving the pusum was placed under the responsibility of caring for the family of the newly married couple. All others who received a portion would give a hen in return which would contribute to the settling of the couple. After the feast the bride would return to her house and is returned to her husband's house in an act known as Lawi That (permanent entry). Divorce for marriage was equally available for men and women and provided on the grounds of physical cruelty and unfaithfulness. In certain circumstances portion of the bride price would be refunded or given up. Chiefs practiced clan endogamy for the purpose of maintaining their dignity and social status by not marrying the commoner class known as hnamchawm. Marriage alliances were a common relationship between chiefs. If a member of the chief's family married a commoner then that individual would lose all privilege and status. The children of these marriages are also not considered part of the chief's clan nor worthy of retaining chieftainship. In some cases if a poor man were to pursue the daughter of a chief then the murder of the said man would not considered an act of cruelty. Such an example is made of Laltheri, the sister of Vanhnuailiana and daughter of Lalsavunga. Her lover Chalthanga was executed and the incident was immortalized as a song.

There are five types of marriage in Mizo society. Lungvar is marriage through negotiation and is the most common type. After paying the bride price the bride goes to the groom's house which is called lawi. Fan is when a man goes and lives in a girl's house as her husband. This practice is considered disgraceful for the man. Luhkung is the practice of a girl living in the man's house as a wife before marriage and this is also disgraceful. Sazumeidawh is a marriage without bride price. This agreement is made with both parties consent and allows the man to leave and divorce her at any time without penalties. These marriages are rare but common for daughters of widows and this custom does not require a palai.

==== Inheritance ====
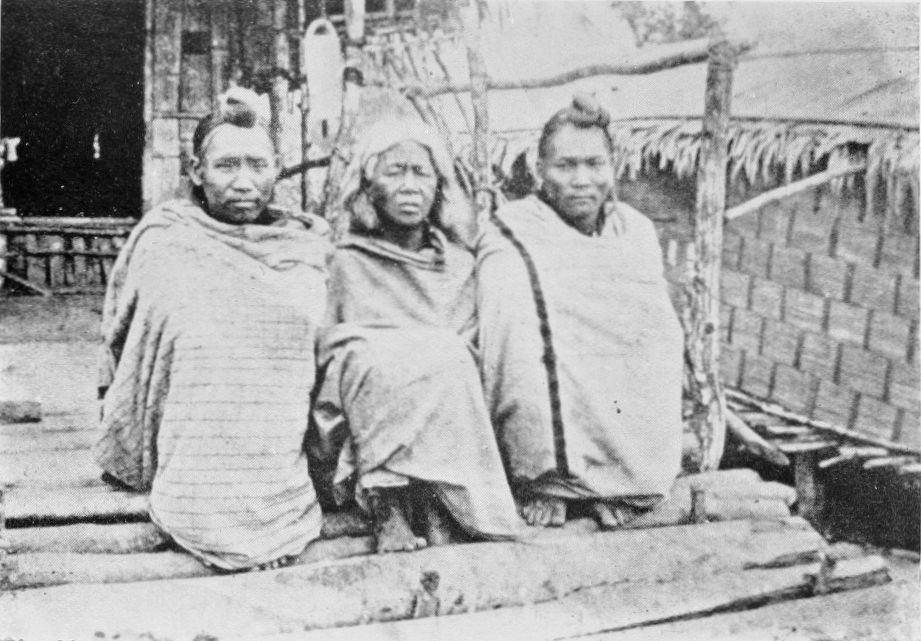
Fânai chieftainess Darbilhi, depicted by John Shakespear.

Traditionally, a chief would have a wife and concubines. The wife of a chief was granted privileges such as immunity from punishments and often treated with semi-divine status. However, she was still expected to take on the roles and work like other women. The wife of a chief also had little to no political influence on their decisions. The concubines are known as hmei and their children hmeifa are considered illegitimate for inheritance. The oldest sons would typically be granted a village as a headsman and answer to the decision of their chief father. The youngest son would stay with the chief and inherit the chiefdom as a result. With the arrival of British administrations, the superintendent approved who would inherit chieftainship and typically awarded it to the eldest sons. The chief also had power to set up new villages under his administration and influence, but this power was restrained with British oversight of the Lushai Hills. The oldest sons would shift a fraction of the settlement's population with him to a new location. The son was not expected to pay any tribute or tax to his father, who was chief. The older sons were left to themselves to secure and consolidate authority as a chief in their own right. The older sons were still morally obligated to aid their father in terms of hardship and distress. In cases where a father chief lived long, and their older sons gained power and prestige, the decision to abandon loyalty was also able to be pursued. Lewin argues that the right to succession of the chief was limited to sons who were potent and gifted with capacity. In the case of the son being a minor, the wife of the chief was permitted to act as regent and possess the powers of chieftainship.

==== Funerals ====
Upon the death of a chief, a ceremonial announcement is made to the village through the tlangau of the chief's death and the successor to the chiefdom. The wives of the chiefs would observe a widow's penance for three months to a year to appease the soul of the deceased. The penance period did not permit any fun activities, meeting new people or travelling to a new place. The chief's corpse was laid to rest on a platform in the courtyard of the chief's house. To prevent the decay of the body, the body was placed in smoke for a whole year before the final burial. Customary Lushai tradition also preferred a chief to be buried in prestige. This was done by burying the chief with the heads of enemies to work as slaves for the chiefs in the afterlife. The highest status chiefs would be accompanied by up to 100 slaves. Other objects buried alongside chiefs would include food and drink, weapons such as their favourite gun, human heads of animals and slaves. Many of the raids before the British annexation were considered to be caused by this practice of headhunting. After the British annexation and halting of raiding traditions, the chiefs were buried with the heads of animals.

Vonolel's Tomb illustrated in James Grant's "Cassell's Illustrated History of India, Volume 2"

The smoking process would consist of a wooden coffin placed near a wall in the chief's house with a hearth built near it. A bamboo tube is run up through the floor of the house and it is fixed through a hold underneath the coffin. The hearth is lit on fire and the corpse slowly dries as a result. The coffin is opened monthly to check the drying process and turned around to spread the effect evenly.

The chief's body would be taken in a procession to the monument site. All the relatives of the chiefs would follow while singing hla (ballads) praising the chief. The puithiam would chant charms and offer the final prayer for the chief. The ceremony would end with a beating of drums and shooting of muskets before reconvening in the chief's house.

Illustration of Chief Vonolel's tomb.

The graves were built as monuments, which were also decorated with the skulls of mithun. The monument would consist of mud, bamboo, stones and logs of wood. Spikes would be planet around the monument with animal and human heads implanted at the tips. The site of these monuments were selected by the upas and preferably placed on the hilltops or the slope of a hill. Some monuments would be made in the courtyard of the chief's house to protect desecration by enemies.

== Precolonial chieftainship ==
=== Origins of chieftainship ===
One account discusses the origins of chieftainship among the Mizos through the Lusei clan. The earliest records of chieftainship among the Mizo tribes are dated to Zahmuaka and his six sons in the 16th century. Zahmuaka was the descendent of Chhualawma, who was adopted after being captured in a raid from the Mizo Tedim wars in the late 16th century. After the death of Chief Chhanpiala of the smaller tribes living in Khawrua and Tlang died, Zahmuaka was nominated by the people to become their chief. His wife, Lawileri played a role in this acceptance. After accepting the role, Zahmuaka became fedup with the chief and attempted to return to his old life as a commoner. The villagers persuaded him to remain chief by offering a basket of paddy annually from each house under his rule. This was the establishment of fathang. Fathang remained as an institution of chieftainship until being abolished in the 1950s. The six sons of Zahmuaka are known as Zadenga, Thangluaha, Thangura, Paliana, Rivunga and Rokhuma.

The sons of Zahmuaka established themselves between the Manipur and Tiau rivers in the early 17th century. Thangur's dynasty became the most well known to the point that the other chief dynasties identified themselves as being related to Thangur. By the 18th century, chieftainship was established into a consistent form which would last till the British annexation of their territories. Originally chieftainship was fought for, but the institution became hereditary through the youngest son, who would remain with the chief while the elder sons would gain their own villages.

While living between the two rivers, the cultivation of crops was not easy. The land on the Chin Hills were not productive as the soil wasn't fertile, and the slopes were too steep. Crops grown during this time were millet, wheat, arum and sweet potato. Lalthangliana argues that poor cultivation of crops was one of the factors responsible for the migration of the Mizos into the Lushai Hills in the 17th century. The agricultural tools were also not efficient. Lalthangliana recognises poems from oral history describing the use of deer horns as hoes for fieldwork. For this reason, it is speculated that iron tools were rare or expensive. In terms of dress, men wore Hnawkhal, which was made of hemp. Women wore similar attire known as Siapsup.

When the Mizos moved west to the Len range and the Tiau Valley on the modern international border, there were changes to living conditions. The Mizos developed knowledge of weaving with hand looms and developed cloth and attire. The pattern of the cloth was white and black stripes. Men and women wore big iron pins, sometimes with ivory beads or accessories. This fashion remained until the 1890s with the British annexation. In terms of weapons, wooden clubs were used traditionally with rare iron swords. The longsword was introduced by the Burmese during the Kabaw Valley settlement era. The bow and arrow were widely used and adopted upon migration to the Len range and Tiau Valley. Early warfare was conducted with duels of the champions of the settlements. When the best warrior was defeated in the duel, it was considered a defeat for the parties. With the introduction and adoption of the bow and arrow, the duels of champions became obsolete. For armour, the Mizos sometimes used copper helmets with goat hair dyed red fixed as an accessory and a cloth wrapped around them called Tawllohpuan (no retreat). A typical Pasalṭha carried a quiver, a staff and a sword.

=== Scholastic Interpretation of chieftainship ===
The social system during the Mizos inhabitation in the Chin Hills was of an egalitarian nature. There were no chiefs to rule a particular clan or group at the time as the population was scattered across well defendable landscapes. However, despite such a social nature, the villages continued to fight for supremacy but only through their best warrior or champion. A duel would take place between the strongest of the warriors of each party and the winning champion would see proclaim victory for his party and their interests. The evolution of warfare coincided with the introduction of bows and arrows among the tribes. As a result, there was an endless struggle for supremacy in the Mizo tribes between the Run and Tlang rivers. After the rise of Zahmuaka the egalitarian system of the Mizo tribes began to decline. The right of chieftainship originated via the strongest individual in the art of warfare who could declare himself as a leader. The right of chieftainship was acquired by might or force before becoming hereditary with the Sailo dynasty. With the proliferation of chiefs a desire for supremacy led to the origination of politics regarding chieftainship. Nag argues that chieftainship emerged in the application of force for power which is almost akin to the force theory of the origin of the state.

=== Migration of the Clans ===
Zahmuaka's son, Thangura, became the most powerful chief among the six sons and was the last to migrate into present day Mizoram. Population increases and increase of chiefs, many smaller and weaker chiefs originally began to migrate west. The descendants of Zadenga were the first to migrate and managed to reach as far as the Chittagong Hill Tracts. Migration was followed starting with Palian and continuing with Rokhum, Rivung, Chenkual and Thangluah descendants. Thangur's grandson Sailova was a famous chief whose name became eponymous to the Sailo clans. Sailo clans also oversaw cooperation with the Ralte, Fanai and Lushai clans.

==== Zadeng chiefs ====
The Zadeng chiefs originally settled in the Champhai area and cooperated with the Ralte chief Mangkhaia's father, Mangthawnga and his brother Thawnglura. Thawnglura guided the Zadengs towards Tualbungah and Zampui. The Zadeng had a chieftainess known as Pidari who ruled the Kawrthah mountain. The Zadengs declined under Lalchungnunga in Mualthuam and Juahzawl. When Lallula's son, Vuta, was captured by the Pawi. The Sailos collected ransom to free him, but Lalchungnunga and the Zadengs refused to pay. The Sailo chiefs Mângpawrha, Lallianvunga and Lalsavunga jointly attacked Lalchungnunga and captured his son Ngura as a hostage. Lalsavunga took the bawis, guns and weapons of the Zadeng chiefs. Lalchungnunga and his chiefs provided their property to ransom Ngura and were forced to migrate westwards into Hill Tipperah.

==== Palian chiefs ====
Palian's son, Lianpuia established himself in Khuanglenga in the northern Lushai Hills. The area was occupied by Hmar tribes and chiefs who had established several areas. The Palians gathered in Dungtlang under the chiefs Pu Buara and Bulpuia. Dungtlang was situated in northeast Mizoram near the current border of Myanmar. Dungtlang existed between 1670-1680 with as many as three thousand homes. When the Sailo chiefs migrated west, Pu Buara moved to the southwest as far as modern day Bangladesh. Dungtlang was prestigious that chief Lallula had initially thought to join it before being convinced by Laltuaka to establish their own coalition.

Buluia's son Huliana migrated to Thinglian, Sialhauvah and Arthlawah before settling in Chipui. Chief Sibuta was known as a prominent Palian chief who erected a large stone for his grave. The Palian chiefs were defeated by Lalpuithanga, the southern Sailos who pressed them. Sibuta's descendant Lalsuthlaha was arrested by the British in the Blackwood expedition in 1844 after a raid.

==== Distribution upon British annexation ====
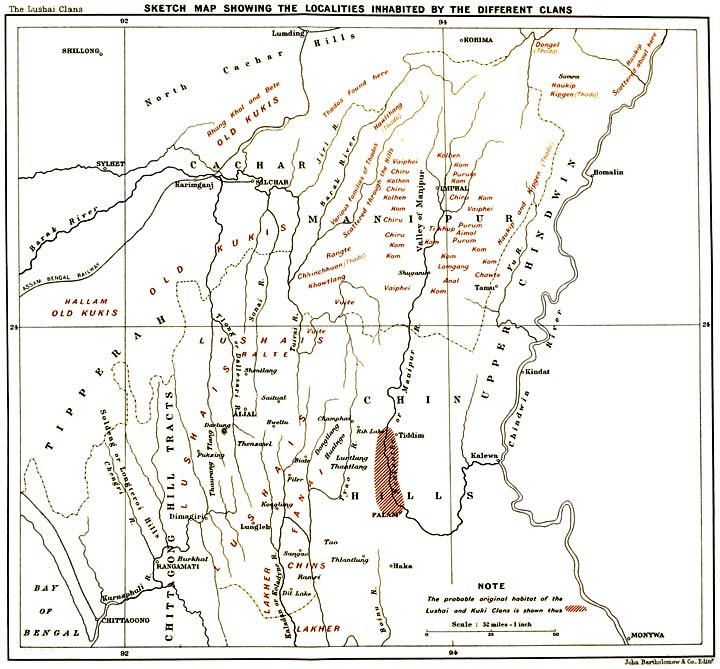
Map of distribution of Lushai-Kuki Clans

By the time of British annexation, the chieftains of Rokhuma were largely integrated and left no traces of their settlements apart from oral history. The chiefs descending from Zadenga, Thangluaha, and Paliana had been severely weakened and had ruled a few petty settlements that were protected by the British. Rivung chiefs settled in Hill Tipperah and were one of the earliest kukis to be recorded by the chief of Chittagong in 1777. The Sailo family under Sailova, son of Thangura, became the predominant tribe in the Lushai Hills. The arrival saw the non-integrating tribes such as Khawtlang and Khawchhak flee to Thadou chieftains in Manipur. Clans that were not part of the Lusheis, saw their languages lost in favour of Duhlien. Apart from the Hmar and Paite who managed to preserve their dialects, the Vanchia, Kohlring, Nennte, Powtu and others eventually adopted Duhlien.

=== Sailo migration ===
The Mizo tribes also migrated into the Lushai Hills due to Chin aggression. The chins were known to the Lushei as poi or pawi. A long-term feud led to a great war that led to the defeat of the Lushei tribes. The large battle between the Mizos and Pawi led to a victory for the Mizos initially. However, during a celebration of Chapchar Kut the Pawi staged an ambush which lead to the destruction of Suaipui inhabited by the Ralte. The event was immortalized in a hla (poem). The chiefs evacuated their villages and settlements to the east of the Tyao river. In 1883, the Lushei attempted another attack against the poi but failed once more by over extending themselves in enemy territory. Up to 40 men were lost in the ambush and the remaining survivors were chased and escaped through the dense jungles back to their homes.

After crossing the Tiau river, the two sons of Sailova, namely Chungnunga and Lianlula established themselves and their sons under Pu Kawlha's village of Selesih. Sailova had died before the migration while the Mizos lived east of the Tiau river. Chungnunga and Lianlula migrated sometime in the early 18th century. Selesih was the largest mizo settlement at the time and was functionally a confederation of chiefs and tribes. It consisted of multiple tribes and clans and petty chiefs ranging from the five major tribes and the 12 minor tribes without feuds. Chungnunga's sons, Lalhluma, Rona and lalchera cooperated with Lianlula's sons, Pu Kawlha, Darliankuala and Darpuiliana. The main purpose of Selesih was to deter attackers such as the Poi in the east. The prestige and attractiveness of the settlement drew many settlers. Both Chungnunga and Lianlula died in Selesih. Eventually Rona's son, Lallula would leave Selesih and spread out across the northern Lushai Hills. His descendants would establish themselves as the dominant power and clan. Selesih eventually dispersed due to the fact that jhumming requires regular migration in order to feed the population.

Early Lushai Chiefs Family Tree

Zahmuaka
Zadeng	Rivunga	Ṭhangura	Paliana	Rokhuma	Thangluaha
Thangmanga	Chawnglula
Chênkuala	Sailova
Chungnunga	Lianlula
Lalhlûma	Rohnâa	Lalchêra	Pu Kawlha	Dârliankuala	Dârpuiliana
Laltuaka	Lallula	Rolûra	Savunga
Lalpuiliana	Lallianvunga	Mângpawrha	Vûta	Lalngûra	Lalzika	Lalbuta
Lalsavunga	Ngûra	Suakpuilala
Vanhnuailiana	Vanpuilala

Lallula established the settlement of Zopui upon leaving Selesih and wished to expand it. As a result, c. 1754 Lallula approached the village of Siakeng under Chief Mangngula. An ultimatum was given to surrender and join his village but Mangngula refused. As a result, Lallula raided the village and took the captives to settle in Zopui. With the growth of Zopui, Lallula turned his focus to the Thlanrawn in the east, who were demanding tributes and threatening raids. Lallula invited Chief Thanchhuma of the Thlanrawn under the false promise of tributes with their delegates and champion warriors. Under the hospitality of zu, the Thlanrawn chief and delegates were intoxicated and asleep. At midnight, Lallula sounded the gong and massacred the defenceless, drunk Thlanrawn warriors. He captured Thanchhuma and his upa Phunthanga, paraded them in shame and humiliated them. The Thlanrawn massacre was immortalized in song by Lallula, who composed it himself. However, the event led Lallula to fear reprisal from the Thlanrawn, and he migrated west. Migrating west, Lallula placed his adopted brother Rorehlova as a buffer chief between the Pawi and him, who was a Fanai. Lallula eventually, during migration, joined his uncle Laltuaka in his village of Sabualah. The settlement grew with 10 chiefs of 3 families. Lallula organized a raid on the Pawi. However, Laltuaka and his family objected, and the raid failed. Lallula returned north and fought with the Zadeng chiefs. His rule was expanded, and the Zadengs were severely weakened as Sailo rule emerged in the north and central Lushai hills. As a result, the Lusei dialect of Duhlien became standardized in the Lushai Hills.

Hmar groups established in Eastern Mizoram were pushed Northwards by the Palian and Sailo chiefs who migrated away from Chin aggression. Other established clans, such as the Pangs, Dawlawng, and Mirawngs, were scattered. The legacy of Hmar settlements is seen in eastern Mizoram, where villages are named after groups such as the Biate, Zote, Dawngawn, Khawbung, Vangchhia, Khawzawl and Thiak. The Lushai clans managed to assimilate smaller clans such as the Chawte, Chongthu, Hnamte, Khiangte and Ngente while other clans like the Fanai, Ralte, Paite and Rangte maintained individualities. Other groups such as the Thadou were forced to migrate north to Cachar. One reason the Lushai Hills area was easy to settle for the Mizo tribes is attributed to the cyclical phenomenon of mautam. By the 18th century, when Mizo tribes migrated into the Lushai Hills, previous settlers had moved on due to the bamboo flowering famines.

=== Internal Conflicts of the Chiefs ===
Lalulla was purported by deputy commissioner Sir John Edgar to be the first Sailo chief to live in Mizoram despite the Sailos entering Mizoram half a century before. Yet, Lalulla was the first Lushei chief to be known to foreign administrations. He led a migration from Myanmar into the western hills. Lalulla's descendants moved westwards and became neighbours to the Zadeng chiefs who considered themselves strong enough to wage war. However, the Zadengs faced defeat and were forced to accept seek alliances with southern chiefs. Lalulla's descendants consolidated their control over northern Mizoram eventually with the absorption of petty chiefs. By 1840, Lallula's son Manga had expanded towards Chatterchoora and had expelled the Paite chief that had previously occupied the hills on each side of the valley of the Gootur. Lallula's other son, Lallianvunga, was situated east of the Tlawng and had pushed the Thado tribes out. Lalsavunga, the grandson of Lallula and son of Lalpuiliana, pushed further east and struggled against the Singsol Thado tribes to conquer the Champhai valley and the hills north of it.

==== Expansion under Lallula's lineages ====
The eastern chiefs, Lalsavunga, Lallianvunga and Vanhnuailiana prospered as the non-Lusei chiefs were pushed out of the Champhai valley and occupied the northern ranges. After the death of Lalsavunga, Lalpong became chief of Sellam with smaller villages placed under his son Poiboi. Vanhnuailiana became the most powerful chief in the eastern Lushai Hills and made Poiboi subordinate to his domain. Vanhnuailiana was described in British reports as waging constant battles and wars and for the most part winning them successfully. He was known for fighting against the Pawi and Sukte, who upon being defeated, he would resettle them across his chiefdoms and villages. The British discovered hundreds of Sukte families resettled among the Lusei tribes. Vanhnuailiana had captured them from the Kamhow chief of Molbehm. Lallianvunga was the second most influential chief in the eastern Lushai Hills. He pushed out the Thado chiefs from the Rengti and Noongari hill ranges. He settled his own capital village near Peak Z. The village was larger than Vanhnuailia's village reportedly. Lallialvunga prepared to occupy thee sites from the northern Thado villages before his death in approximately 1849. The death of Lallianvunga saw his son Ngura (recorded as Mora/Mullah) wage battles against the Thados of Kaimong.

==== Lister Expedition ====
However, an issue was raised when it was discovered the Thados had retreated to Cachar, which was now British territory. Two gongs were stolen from them during the raid, as claimed by the Lushais. The British assigned Lieutenant Colonel Frederick George Lister to investigate the incident and the boundary of British sovereignty. After deliberation the Lister Expedition was arranged under F.G. Lister. He utilised Kuki guides and crossed the terrain into the Lushai Hills. He surprised Ngura's village whose fighting men had gone on another mission. Lister and his men burnt down Ngura's village but retreated out of the Lushai Hills.

==== Post Lister Expedition ====
Ngura would die shortly after the Lister Expedition. He would be succeeded by his infant son Vanpuilala whose mother Lalhlupuii would become regent. Lalhlupuii moved Lallianvunga's original village from Peak Z to a site named "old Kholil". The original intention to settle the northern Thado villages was abandoned. Instead, the Lushais established frontier villages to control the entry of woodcutters and traders. This would, in a British report, be recorded as a mistake as for years after Lister's Expedition, there would be little to no intelligence gained on the Lushai Hills and their inhabitants.

Suakpuilala (recorded as Sukpilal) ascended as chief of the western Lushai Hills. He cooperated with Lalhlupuii who granted consent to Suakpuilala to expand towards the Sonai. When Lalhlupuii's son Vanpuilala came of age, he couldn't assert his claim to the Sonai any longer as he was surrounded by the Suktê, Pawi and Haulawng tribes.

Eastern Lushai Chiefs Family Tree

Lallula
Mângpawrha	Lallianvunga	Lalpuiliana	Vûta	Neipuithangi
Suakpuilala	Ngûra	Lalphunga	Thâwmvunga	Lalsavunga
Vanpuilala	Pâwibâwia	Lalruma	Chenglena	Vanhnuailiana	Laltheri
Lalhleia	Doțhiauva	Liankhama	Ropuiliani	Lalburha	Buangtheuva
Thangkâma	Vanphunga	Lalruaia	Lalthuama
Langthanglula	Sanglura	Lalvunga	Lungliana	Kairûma	Lalkhûma

==== North-South Wars ====
Further developments saw a north–south war between Sailo chiefs in the 1850s. Vuta in the north was in a dispute with Lalpuithanga, Thangdula and Thuama in the south. The possession of land was in dispute, and the composition of a mocking song. Vuta had defeated the Zadeng tribe and had established many villages before deciding to settle further south in Buanhmun. Vuta claimed the land by building a temporary hut to develop a village around. Lalpuithanga, in the agitation against Vuta's encroachment, moved in and settled the land instead. Vuta, in retaliation, deliberately led his people to migrate to Buanhum. Lalpuithanga conceded and migrated back to his hometown of Vanchengte. Vuta then composed a song mocking lalpuithnga for backing away from Buanhmun. This was the foundation for the divide between the North and South chieftains.

Before Lalpuithanga moved out of Buanhmun, he took a gun which belonged to Vuta's village. Vuta brought his nephew Thawmvunga, a renowned pasaltha, to a meeting with Lalpuithanga. Lalpuithanga's upas, who mostly consisted of Zadeng tribesmen wanting revenge, had planned to ambush Vuta during the meeting. Each of them concealed a stick. When confronted about the mocking song, Vuta became fearful. However, Thawmvunga waved his dao around in anger. This subdued the upas of Lalpuithanga, and Thawmvunga was able to take the gun back unceremoniously.

Lalpuithanga's upas then further chased Thawmvunga and attempted to take the gun back. In the ensuing struggle, Thawmvunga sawed off the barrel of the rifle with his dao. When Vuta and Thawmvunga ran off, Lalpuithanga's upa fired a volley after them and missed. This signalled a declaration of war. This led to incessant raids on each other.

Vuta had allied with Chief Khawtindala (Son of Rorehlova) of Khuanglum against Chief Thuama (Son of Lalpuithanga) of Khawlung. Vuta's son accompanied the Fanai of Khawtindala and planned to raid Khawlung. The bridge to access Khawlung was left assembled allowing the party to reach the village in secret during the night. The party killed all the men in the Zawlbuk as they woke up. With no defense, the raiding party massacred Khawlung and killed many individuals. Many women and children were taken captive. The massacre was ingrained and immortalized as a song. The original North-South War lasted six years. The south managed more successful raids but the raid of Khawlung cemented the victory into northern hands. However, no peace settlement was reached and hostilies finally ceased with mautam famine.

According to the British, such as John Shakespear, the north–south war concerned the descendants of Lallula in the North, who were embroiled in a fight with the family of Rolura in the South in 1856. The north–south war occurred between the chiefs who belonged to the same family and had settled their villages closely. The point of contention concerned the territory of Piler Hill. It was so close that their jhum cultivation lands would also touch each other. Due to this, the chiefs agreed not to ambush cultivation of their jhums as opposed to traditional warfare. After the Khawnglung massacre, the war practically ended in the capture of Thuama's wife and son. Thuama's wife was ransomed for necklaces by the Pawi who were allied with Vuta. Meanwhile, Thuama's son, Lalhleia, was raised by Vuta. After the war chiefs united against Poi and Sukte aggression. Due to this Pois failed to maintain a permanent settlement in Sailo territory.

==== East-West Wars ====
The Sailo chiefs lost unity once more as Sukpilal, the head of the western Sailo chiefs, and Lalsavunga, the head of the Eastern Sailo chiefs, grew tensions. This was due to the lack of help to the eastern chiefs in migrating east against the Chin. The western chiefs preferred to strengthen and defend their own dominion and expand west and north instead. War emerged between the east and west chiefs after a dispute over a marriage candidate of a fallen chieftain's daughter. The Lushai expedition eventually cooled the internal tensions of the Sailo chiefs. Khalkam, the son of Sukpilal, wanted to marry an Eastern Lushai woman named Tuali. Tuali was already settled to be betrothed to an eastern chief named Lenkhama. Upon her marriage, Khalkam sought help of his grandmother Pibuk. Pibuk and her son Sukpilal waged war on Lenkhama. Another eastern chief, Laljeeka, who was refused betrothal to Sukpilal's sister Banaitangi, joined Lenkhama in exacting revenge. The war continued from 1864 to 1867.

A second east–west war formed due to a dispute over the jhum land. In 1876–1877, Sukpilal's son, Lengpunga and Savunga's son, Laljeeka, undertook an expedition against the Sailo village of Pugrying. The village was plundered and the inhabitants were taken captive. Similarly, Khalkam began a quarrel with Poiboi because he was cultivating crops on jhums claimed by Poiboi. A coalition of chiefs formed in the west consisting of Sukpilal, Khalkam and Lengpunga against the coalition of eastern chiefs consisting of Lemkam, Lalbura, Chungleng and Bungtey. Sukpilal attempted to involve British authorities against the Eastern chiefs which was refused. In November 1877, Sookpilal sent his upas to request the British to mediate peace. In January 1878, Lengkam's upas compensated traders of the Tipaimukh bazaar and requested the British for peace mediation. The British offered Cachar as a meeting place. Upas from western and eastern chiefs met up on the 8th of December. They expressed the unpopular nature of the war and how shameful it is to express peace first. The deputy commissioner recommended simultaneous advances based on his advice. However, this did not lead anywhere.

In April 1879, Sukpilal's sons Labruma and Lengpung planned an attack on the villages of Poiboi, Lemkam and Chungleng in retaliation for the burning of jhum huts. However, on the way, they encountered Poiboi's grandmother in her village between each of them, who turned them away with friendly overtures. In July 1879, new plans were made for a raid on Poiboi but were abandoned after they were leaked. The onset of the mautam famine began to make Lushai individuals come to the British in want of food. Around the onset of the famine, Sookpilal died unrelated to it from his own illnesses. This doused hopes for a peaceful resolution in the east–west war. In early 1881, the eastern chiefs began to increase the raiding of villages such as Chief Thangula's. The unpopularity of a war during famine times saw up to 400 people leave Khalkam for Cachar. The pressure of famine led the chiefs Poiboi, Khalkam, and Lalhai to meet and agree to cease hostilities and obtain food together from Cachar.

=== Famine ===
The synchronous bamboo flowering in the ecological cycle has been recorded as a cause of famines in Mizo history. In 1860, oral history records a mautam famine. This phenomenon extended beyond the Lushai Hills to Cachar and southern Manipur, recorded by British administrators like Colonel McCulloch, purporting how a flowering of bamboo had led to a boom in the rat population and social chaos.

The following 1881 famine led to an estimated 15,000 deaths in the Lushai Hills. This weakening of the tribal economy, which relied on manpower, headhunting, and slavery, weakened the chiefs. Some chiefs turned to cooperation with the British or sold their weapons in return for food relief. It also showed an intensification of attacks and raiding as other chiefs began to take food by force from the plains, up to 500 people were also taken captive to supplement their lost labour and manpower or simply killed during raids.

Labour had to be conserved and was stretched thin, which would mean hunting parties could not be established because traditionally, hunting parties would deprive the villages' ability to defend against a raid if a neighbouring village were to take their resources during the famine. The most common way of dealing with an incoming famine was to save rice from previous years with kaka which consisted of crop millet that can be preserved in the long term. In the western Lushai Hills, the villages would practice wet rice cultivation if they had land in the plains region. The western Lushai Hills had access to the knowledge of wet rice cultivation and this would drown the rats or deter them from eating the paddies. Crops such as tapioca and Colocasia were harvested as the rats did not consume them. In terms of foraging, the rats tended to spare the sago in sago palm and wild yam. Cotton seeds were devoured by rats, so the economic opportunity to import food was also impacted as no goods could be produced to effectively trade, such as Lushai cloth and handicrafts. Another traditional solution was to consume the rats by drying them over a fire; however, the large supply of rat meat made it aversive. Individuals from the tribes also left the chiefs and became refugees to the British for food and shelter. The refugees explained the situation of the mautam famine, which was corroborated by karbaris who validated the claim. Mass migrations of Lushai tribespeople caused fear in plains workers who saw the people as fierce and savage raiders. Migration were seen in bordering frontiers such as Cachar, Tipaimukh and Jalnacherra.

The British provided famine relief by sending 18,000 maunds of rice and 2000 maunds of paddy from Cachar and local traders. As the famine didn't intensify many Lushai refugees returned to their villages and distressed refugee seekers ceased by June–September 1882. The chiefs would also sell their ivory jewellery and valuables to raise money for food. Economic developments such as rubber tapping became overtapped to fund their food supply. The willingness to trade their guns and rifles for food signalled to the British a weakness and imminent capitulation. The chiefs also urged the establishment of trading posts that can supply grain and agreed to pay out loans with their jhum harvests.

=== Foreign Relations ===
==== Tripura ====
The Lushai clans held relations with Hill Tipperah as mercenaries and vassals. Lushai chiefs would supply warriors in exchange for goods or money. Achyut Charan Choudhury in his works covered how the Radharam, a ruler in the pratapgarh Kingdom, staged the revolt of Radharam with aid from Kuki and Lushai mercenaries.

In the mythology of Tripura's adoption of Hinduism concerning Shiva, the chronicles detail how the Kukis stirred trouble in the celestial realm. The mythology details how Shiva fell into passion for a Kuki woman in the king's retinue when he visited the realm. As a result, Shiva's consort Parvati was said to have broke the woman's neck via a divine kick.

Kishen Manik, the last Tripura king appointed by the Mughals died in 1780 and was succeeded by Rajendar Manik. The Mizo tribes raided the territory of Tripura but was punished by Rajendar Manik who successfully made an inroad towards the hill territories. However, Rajendar Manik created a succession dispute through his two sons, the crown prince Durgamoni and the second in line Ramgunga. Ramgunga seized the throne on Rajdenar's death and propelled Durgamoni to gather forces to expel him. The British intervened to stop the outbreak of violence allowing Ramgunga to remain in power. Ramgunga's oppression of the Poitoo Mizos enabled several of the chiefdoms to readily join the side of Durgamoni to attack him in 1808. Durgamoni retook the throne with British recognition in 1809.

In 1808, the British conducted investigation of the Tripura economy by the Special Commissioner. It divided the demographic into an asian descended Hindu population and the Kukis. The Kukis of Tripura were categorized into ranks. The chief men among the Kuki tribes were called Roys, Senaputty, Chuppiahs and Gaboors. 3000 Kukis armed with spears and bows served their chiefs answering to the kingdom alongside 1000 Hindu Tripuris armed with matchlock rifles. Throughout the history of Tripura, the British recorded that many of its kings expanded their borders aggressively towards the Kuki tribes. The Tripura kings would conduct "desultory warfare" against the tribes and reduce villages to subjection and vassalage. Tripura historically did not admit any definite limit to its territory to the eastern Lushai Hills. The invasions of Mizo chiefdoms would emboril conflicts with deeper tribes raiding British assets.

The Tripura Kingdom also held a dispute with Manipur regarding the territory of the Khongjai Kukis residing in Cachar. The king claimed Thanghum in order to establish a thanna. This was motivated by fear of the Poitoo Kukis, who numbered 50,000-60,000 and were reputed to be formidable and turbulent. Many roads connecting Tripura with Manipur and other princely kingdoms would be longer than needed in an effort to avoid Kuki territory and the hills. The king attempted to invade the Thanghum despite a Manipur chief establishing a Thanna there. The British refused to let the king march and retake the settlement.

The Kuki and Mizo tribes would visit the plains in Tripura to trade and barter resources. The British recognised the King's claim to the east but assumed that the king was too weak to force any tribes to pay tributes. The zamindars and merchants of Tripura would annually gift the tribes several gifts as an appeasement or to encourage trade of forest products. Woodcutters would pay passage tax to chiefs when procuring timber. In 1826, a party of woodcutters were massacred by a Mizo chief known as Buntye. The magistrate sent messengers to visit the village and discovered that Zamindars had withheld annual presents and tributes. Two of the messengers were detained by Buntye and one was sent back with the head of a woodcutter to induce the zamindar to comply with the demands. The government authorised payment but also closed all markets and trade with the Kukis.

The Tripura king, in reporting to the British, also claimed sovereignty in the eastern territories extending towards the Lushai Hills. The British assumed that the Tripura King could not derive any profit from the tribes. After the raid by Lalasuthlaha, the British demanded that King Krishna Kishore Manikya hold his subjects accountable, as the chief was a tributary to Tripura by offering of elephant tusks and other commodities like other Mizo chiefs. The British assumed that the king enabled Lalsuthlaha to raid to settle a territorial dispute. After failing to enforce his authority over the tribes, the British participated in the Blackwood Expedition and declared the Mizo tribes as de facto independent of the King.

==== Manipur ====
Another instance was when two fugitive Manipuri princes, Ram Singh and Tribonjit Singh, requested the aid of Chief Laroo to capture the throne of Manipur. Laroo declined because the king of Manipur at the time was the father-in-law of the King of Hill Tipperah. In due time, Lushai chiefdoms in Manipur faced rigid political control, while in Hill Tipperah, the gradual decline and political vacuum made the frontiers of the British East India Company insecure.

Willaim McCulloch in a report in 1861 stated that the Lushais were considered powerful to the south of Manipur but were on friendly relations. McCulloch established Kuki villages in southern Manipur and armed them in a policy he termed as Sepoy villages. The purpose was to allow the kukis unrestricted cultivation in return for scouting the movements of raiding parties of Mizos.

In the succession disputes for the throne of Manipur, various raids by royal family members were made up until 1866, when they ceased. The raids were attributed to the cooperation of the Mizos. The Manipuris further participated in punitive expeditions such as the Lushai Expedition. In 1870, the British established the policy of dealing with the Mizo tribes, which followed appeasement by restraining the Manipur King and Kuki subjects in Manipur to refrain from unprovoked aggression.

In 1873, the Mizo chief Damboom settled his chiefdom into the territory of Manipur. The Manipuri authorities kept it a secret until the British summoned him on realization. The political agent Dr. Brown inquired the interest of the British and Manipur to remain at peace and to encourage trade and free communication. Dr. Brown considered a tour of the Lushai Hills and was supported by Damboon. Damboom ventured to inquire with Mizo chiefs but was detained in the Lushai Hills and unable to return. Dr Brown was informed to require permission to make any journey into the Lushai Hills with the express invitation of the chiefs to do so.

In 1877, the Mizo chiefs, Lalburha, Pawibawia and Liankhama, repeatedly raided the villages of Nagas in Manipur territory. The Manipuri guards were overrun in the raids and unable to protect the Nagas. As a result, the villages were evacuated with the Nagas resettling in Cachar or further north. The Manipur king sent a deputation to the three chiefs to conciliate them. The Manipur king offered gifts and tributes to Liankhama and Pawibawia via deputations at Tipaimukh. The deputations ventured further in defiance of official orders and were received well by Pawibawia. However, Pawibawia dissuaded them from going further to meet with Liankhama despite providing men to escort them which offended Liankhama. However, the presents led to an agreement to maintain a truce with the Nagas.

In the case of Manipur and Tripura, the Lushai chiefs would see the surrounding kingdoms as powerful chiefs. For the British, the Lushai chiefs referred to them as white chiefs. Thomas Herbert Lewin, superintendent of the Chittagong Hill Tracts, was named Thangliana as an exonym and recognition as a chief. Lushai chiefs would cross boundaries and appeal to British authorities for protection at times and even offer gifts and tributes, which were declined.

==== Chin Hills ====
Chieftains would also give tribute to other chiefdoms. This was recorded in 1895-1986 when the British realized that the chief of Falam were taking tribute and making demands of the Lushai chiefs such as Kairuma and some nearer to Aizawl. The political officer of the North Lushai Hills made notices to not pay these tributes anymore.

=== British Appeasement ===
After the Lister Expedition, the chiefs began to understand the true capacity of the British on their frontier. Captain Stewart, the deputy Commissioner of Cachar held a meeting with Suakpuilala to open up relations between the Lushais and British. Using bags of rice, Captain Stewart succeeded in bringing more chiefs to meet with him. These were namely, the delegates of Vanhnuailiana, Vuta and Vanhnuailiana's brother, Lalphunga. They met in Silchar and discussed the possibility of becoming ryots to the British. This was due to the pressure of the Chins and the Burmese who were heavily armed with firearms. The chiefs were willing to pay tribute to the British for protection from the Chins instead of paying tribute to the Chins directly. The meeting revealed that the raids were a result of a need of bawis to trade to the Chins for firearms.

In December 1850, Suakpuilala met with the divisional commander of Cachar with his followers. Suakpuilala's two Pawi followers held firearms which were examined to be of American origin named G. Alton. Suakpuilala would send apologies to Stewart in Cachar for his participation in the Adampore raids as he needed bawis to buy muskets. Stewart offered Suakpuilala to meet with him personally to swear friendship and that he had his word that he would not be harmed or detained. Suakpuilala himself was under pressure from his brother-in-law Ngrusailova (son of Lalsuthlaha). Suakpuilala's sister, Banaitangi left Ngursailova and thus he demanded bawis as compensation. Ngursailova was an enemy of the British due to the fate of his father, Lalsuthlaha, and thus wished to take revenge via raiding.

During negotiations, the new ruler of Tripura offered to cooperate in attacking Suakpuilala and Ngursailova, but the British declined due to their policy of appeasement. However, the negotiations did not gain progress. Suakpuilala offered tribute via elephant tusks which Stewart offered woolen cloth in return. The tribute was made to request the British to declare war on the Pawi tribes but the British refused to intervene. During this meeting Suakpuilala also informed Stewart of the lack of trusts chief's had in the British after the injustice of the Blackwood Expedition and Lalsuthlaha's fate.

Stewart was soon succeeded by Sir John Ware Edgar. Edgar formed a successful treaty with Vanlalpuia, the son of Ngura whom Lister targeted. Vanlalpuia agreed to commit no more raids nor cooperate with chiefs intending to raid.

=== Anglo-Lushai relations ===
Before the British, the only records of the Mizo tribes were from local merchants who would enter the Lushai Hills, known as karbaris. They would subsequently provide information and insight into the nature of the Lushai chiefs, their language, and the privilege of accessing their territory. Amidst the internal conflicts, the chiefs also engaged in raiding, headhunting and kidnapping of British subjects working in tea plantations. The Lushai chiefs attacked and raided Sylhet in 1844, Hill Tipperah in 1847, and Sylhet and Cachar in 1849, continuing sporadically to 1862 and 1868. The British sent their first expeditionary force in December 1844 against these raids. A chief named Lalsuktla had raided Kochabari, a Manipuri settlement in Sylhet, to collect heads to commemorate the passing of the previous chief, Lalrinha. Twenty people were killed, and six were captured. Lalsuktla was defeated and apprehended, but this didn't stop further raids. Another expedition was prepared in 1850 to strike against Chief Mulla who had razed a Kuki village in Silchar tolling twenty-nine deaths and forty-two captives. Mulla's village was burnt down but was forced to retreat against a bigger force of 5000-7000 being mobilized. The 1849 raid in Cachar saw a despatch of Frederick Lister with Sylhet light infantry. His report advocated for an expedition of 3,000 men to control the roads and depots of trade. The Bengal government rejected the offer, preferring military outposts and Kuki mercenaries to counter Mizo aggression.

The British employed a Policy of Conciliation for Northeastern chiefs between 1850 and 1870. This oversaw chiefs releasing captives and participating in exchange for gifts. Some chiefs allied with the British due to these advancements. One of the expeditions against a chief called Suikpilal was put off in favour of a declaration of friendship. The expansion of tea estates however remained to threaten the sovereignty of chieftains. This led Chief Vonpilal and other chiefs to launch an official complaint and objection to British encroachment. Captain Steward, the superintendent of Cachar, attempted negotiations and assured that tea estates were beneficial. This failed to reassure the chiefs who united to jointly resist the British encroachment.

In 1850, Chief Suikpilal cooperated with the British by sending an emissary to Cachar about the fear of Pawi attacks in the South. The British assured non-interference if British borders were respected in return. During this period, some Lushai labourers left the hills and worked in tea gardens and timber industries. The British authorities such as the Lieutenant Governor of Bengal decided on a policy of leaving chiefs undisturbed in the administration of their territory. Relations soured in 1860, after Chief Rothangpuia razed a village in Tipperah. The tensions lead to chiefs withholding their men and labourers from working on British tea estates. Suikpilal also participated in a raid in 1862. The deputy commissioner of Cachar negotiated terms for tribute to the British in return for payment. Proposals for a punitive expedition were rejected because of the failure of attempts before and the expenses required. A policy of obtaining political control was preferable.

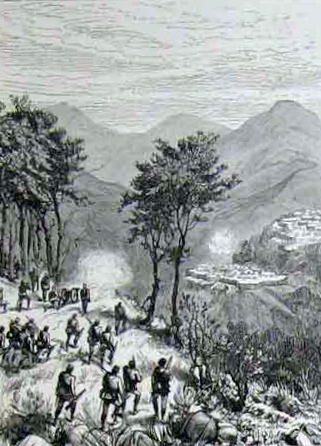
First Shell Fired At Howsatta's Village - ILN 1889

The British tried another agreement between chiefs to agree on the border of Cachar and their territories. A deputation of chiefs with Deputy Commissioner Edgar met to renew amicable relationships. Edgar took a tour of the Lushai Hills and granted the chiefs charters defining their duties and terms of relations with the government as well as defining a fixed border. The chief's rights to toll traders in their territory and settling of new villages would not be opposed. However, the kidnapping of Mary Winchester by Chief Bengkhuaia led to the British intervening in the Lushai Expedition. The incident was followed by other chiefs, such as Lalbura attacking the Monierkhal outpost and Thanranga raiding Nugdigram. The British replaced their Policy of Conciliation with the Forward Policy. Some Chiefs began to cooperate with the British and participated in their markets. Lalbura surrendered in his village when expeditionary forces reached Champhai. He was forced to grant the British their peace demands. The demands included granting free access to his village, providing three hostages to the force, seizure of arms and heavy fines. The fines consisted of elephant tusks, a necklace, a war gong and several animals. The force then recovered Mary Winchester and subdued numerous chiefs. Peace was established with the chiefs until 1888 when large-scale raiding resumed. The results of the Lushai expedition saw administrators like Edgar prefer a humanitarian approach of trade, barter and education versus T.H Lewin, who advocated complete subjugation of the tribes. The government's policy of non-intervention decided to ban British subjects from entering the Lushai Hills to potentially agitate raiders and chieftains.

=== Anti-Sailo rebellion (Lal Sawi) ===
In the 1880s, the Mizo people began to dethrone their chiefs and their upas. The rebellion began in 1885 in the village of Lalkhama, the son of Vuta. It spread further to the village of Hmawngkawn under Vanphunga. The villagers rounded up the chief and upas and made them hold burning firebrands in their hands. They brought the chiefs and upas to a trough of water and forced the chief to immerse the burning end of the firebrand and repeat a vow stating: "Just as this firebrand is extinguished, so let my chieftainship be extinguished". The upas were made to recite a similar oath: "If I back up, align myself, or side with the chief again, I will be doused and extinguished like this!".

The rebellion continued and many more villages followed suit in dethroning their chiefs. Many of Vuta's sons were stripped of their authority, power and chieftainship in an overthrow. Vanphunga fled to Lianphunga's village of Lungtian and requested him to take anything from his village to restore order. Lianphunga arrived to Hmawngkawn with Lalhluma. The villagers had placed a bamboo at the entrance and were armed with guns. They threatened to shoot anyone who would try to enter. Lalhluma declared his name and stepped over the bamboo line in defiance. No one shot at Lalhlume except for Luahmanga who missed Lalhluma. The individuals hence surrendered and accepted chieftainship once more. Lalhluma and Lianphunga confiscated whatever they wanted from Vanphunga and allowed the bad chiefs to restore their rule over the villages once more.

=== Chin-Lushai expedition ===
Within the peaceful years between the Mizo and the British, bazaars were established on the borders to encourage trade. The Lushai chiefs would barter rubber, ivory, and forest produce in return for salt, iron utensils, and tobacco. Internally, the Sailo chiefs engaged in the east–west war and encountered an anti-Sailo rebellion aimed at dethroning the chiefs, which was crushed. Depite the policy of non-interference, the British did intervene in the internal conflicts of the Lushai Hills. The British supplied help to Chief Lalngura against his enemy, the Howlong Chief Bengkhuaia. Help was provided to the Eastern chiefs conflict between Laljeika and Lalngura in 1881. After the death of Suikpilal, a close cooperator and prestigious chief, the succession wars over his descendants began, intensifying the anarchy in the Lushai Hills. The mautam famine also occurred in the 1880s; due to this, traders were encouraged to provide aid in rice under police protection.

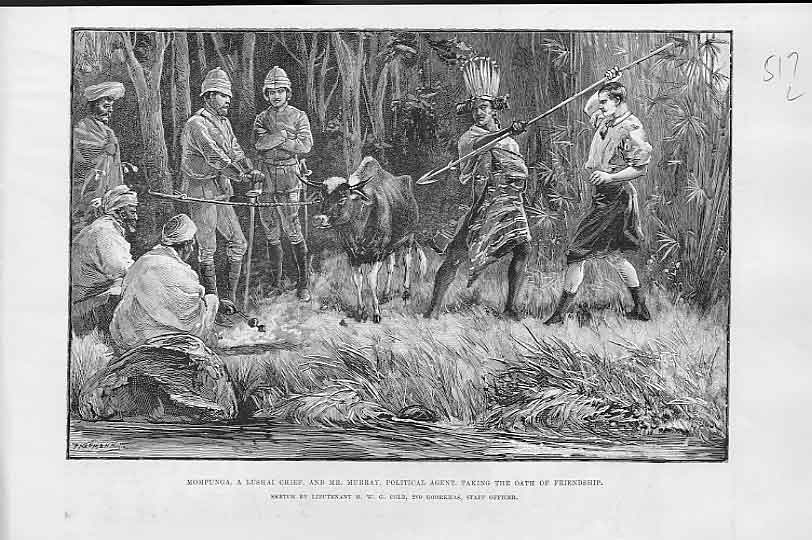
Mompunga, a Lushai chief, and Mr. Murray, Political Agent, taking the oath of friendship - ILN 1890

By 1888, Sailo chiefs and a Pawi chief began to resume raiding British plantations and killing British subjects. Two expeditions were held in close succession in 1889. The first 1888 expedition oversaw exacting punishment to chiefs responsible for raiding in the south. A fort was established at Lunglei, and the force burnt down the offender, Housata's village. The second expedition, known as the Chin-Lushai Expedition of 1889–90, did not meet resistance from Mizo chiefs and saw the establishment of Fort Aijal. Captain Browne of the North Lushai Hills was responsible for disarming the tribes of guns but was ambushed fatally. The British eventually burned down several villages of the western chiefs who tried to attack Aijal. The eastern Sailo chiefs did not resist the British.

=== Lushai Rising ===
The chiefs continued to resist after establishing the North and South Lushai Hills. This was exacerbated by the policies of a house tax and coolie labour quotas. By 1895 the situation became stable in the Lushai Hills and chiefs no longer resisted the British militarily.

==== Ropuiliani ====
Ropuiliani was a Mizo chieftainess. She was the wife of a prestigious chief, Vandula in the South Lushai Hills. When her eldest son Dotawna died with only minor sons, Ropuiliani took over as regent and chieftainess. She continued her husband's policies of non-cooperation and resistance to British power. Negotiations were rejected, and taxes, labour levies, and rice demands were all withheld from the British. The settlement of the British at Lunglei led to Ropuiliani instigating her allies Zakapa and Dokapa to confront the British, attempting to disarm the chiefs. This is what led to the killing of H.R Browne. Ropuiliani and her son Lalthuama did not attend the Chief's Durbar held in 1890. She refused to attend all three durbars. The British efforts to let Ropuiliani's brothers Seipuia and Lalluava convince her also failed. The British even sent an interpreter known as a Rashi, which frustrated her to the point a warrior named Hnawncheuva executed the interpreter.

The British decided to raid Ropuiliani's village upon hearing of the execution. The raid was organized under Captain John Shakespeare and R.H.S Hutchinson and Pugh. It was discovered that Ropuiliani, Lalthuama and a northern chief, Doakoma, planned an uprising against the British. An ultimatum was given to pay a fine of several guns, pigs, fowls and rice. After some resistance, the British captured Ropuiliani and her son Lalthuama, which left the settlement leaderless. Ropuiliani was carried in a palanquin claiming she was unable to walk with her captors. In jail she was offered the opportunity for peace and freedom if she submitted to British rule which was rejected once again. Ropuiliani and her son were eventually moved to a prison in Chittagong Hill Tracts out of fear of her influence.

Ropuiliani's old age and health was reason of concern to free her from jail. Before she could be released, she died in confinement on 6 January 1895. Her death ultimately decentralized coordinate efforts to resist British takeover of the Lushai Hills. Guns amounting up to 100 in Ropuiliani's village and 500 in allies settlements were seized subsequently.

== Mizo chiefdom in modern history ==
=== Chieftainship during British Rule ===
The first political officer of the North Lushai Hills, H.R Browne, was killed by resisting chiefs in 1890. The succeeding officer R.B. McCabe took action to punish the chiefs by burning down villages in the eastern hills and destroying crops. Rebellious chiefs such as Kalkhama, Lianphinga and Thanghula were deported. Another uprising in the South Lushai Hills was also crushed in 1891 led by Zakapa. Chiefs that resisted militarily to the new policies of house tax and coolie labour quotas had the villages burnt down subsequently. By 1895, Shakespeare of the South Lushai Hills decided that gentle civilian rule could be established rather than constant military responses. Outposts and forts were decommissioned for financial and budget reasons, and the British let the chiefs manage the internal administration of the villages.

During the British colonial era of Mizoram, the British pursued a gradual policy of weakening the power of the chiefs. The British allowed the chiefs to continue their rule in accordance with aligning to British interests and authorities such as the superintendent and administrators. A number of rights and privileges exercised by the chiefs were permitted to remain unaltered. This paled in comparison to the erosion of the prestige of chieftains and their traditional roles. In 1901 the British introduced the circle system administered by chiefs. The circle system would see regulations on the practice of jhumming by restricting it to the circle administered by the particular chief. British interest in cash crops such as coffee, cotton, potatoes and oranges was also introduced under private ownership policies, further changing the traditional doctrines of land distribution under chieftainships. Around this time the British also began to offer chieftainship to non-noble persons. The earliest and most prominent example being Chief Dâra of Pukpui.

The changes in chieftainship under British intervention can be seen as standardizing indirect rule of the Lushai tribes by limiting the power of the chiefs but granting autonomy in standard administration and chieftain rights. The land was under the government but effectively treated as a hereditary possession of chiefs who could exercise reasonable rights on it. The British also diluted the power of traditional chiefs by proclaiming and granting chieftainship on individuals who would not ordinarily be granted such a right under the traditional system. The British also extinguished certain rights of chiefs such as:

- The right to order capital punishment.
- Right to seize food stores and property of villagers who wishes to transfer allegiance to another chief.
- Right to tax traders doing business in the jurisdiction of the Chief.
- Right to freedom of action in making their son's chief of their territory or jurisdiction.
- Right to attach the property of their villagers when they wished or deemed fit with or without fault of the villager.
- Right to freedom of action in decisions involving bawis (slaves).

Customary Mizo law continued to be exercised by chiefs but serious crimes such as murder, rape and sodomy were to be put under British jurisdiction in courts at Aizawl and Lunglei. Novel responsibilities for chiefs included maintaining routes between villages, reporting epidemics, heinous crimes, serious accidents, and the presence of foreigners.

During this era a new privileged class began to emerge with British modernisation and Christianity. This privileged class would challenge the power of chieftainship in the Lushai Hills. The increase of employment in government jobs and rise of salaried employment allowed for the cultivation of material wealth which would afford social mobility. This increased opportunities for education beyond the free primary course which would require extensive agricultural cultivation to afford for traditional communities. This privileged class was described as an intelligentsia that did not belong to indigenous Lushai society. It dominated in fields of medicine as doctors, agriculture as experts and nurses which was increasingly pushed back upon and unappreciated.

The British also employed a policy known as non-interference. Non-interference saw that the British would rule and administrate the lands of the Lushai Hills through the Chief's and their existing institutions. The British tended to also confer chieftainship to anyone they felt that would be helpful as a collaborator, hence increasing the number of chiefs drastically through the years of administration. The British policy of sanctioning Chiefs to carry out administrative duties led to a pattern of autocratic tendencies in tribal leadership. The British also enabled the system of Bawis and headhunting, as these two factors determined the power of a chief and did not wish to curb these privileges. Tribal groups requested for a new administration and policy through democratic representation in a memorandum submitted to the Governor of Assam in December 1933. However, the memorandum was rejected by the governor on suspicions of conspiracy and objection to increasing representation for scheduled tribes.

In 1935, the Young Mizo Association (YMA) formed and voiced their issues during the latter era of the British colonial period. Their concerns particularly focussed on the lack of democratic institutions in Mizoram and the privileged positions of chiefs and their councils. R. Vanlawma, a member of the YMA, founded the Mizo Commoner's Union to oppose and abolish chiefly rule. Its leadership and political direction was to emerge in union with India as this would entail the disbandment of the institution of chieftainship. The party split into left-wing and right-wing factions. The right wing was dominated by chiefs who rejected the union with India. Some members of the Mizo Union right wing supported a union with Burma to form a separate province in Burma. This led to the establishment of the United Mizo Freedom Organization. However, with little time to campaign and having a reputation as privileged elite chiefs, support for the party was small and ineffective to secure any political goals.

In 1937 under Superintendent Anthony Gilchrist McCall, a new set of rules regulating the power and rights of the chiefs were standardised:

1. A chief was responsible for control of all villages under him in all respects.
2. A chief should know his subjects personally, understand their difficulties, their living conditions and should encourage them in all ways.
3. It was his duty to allot lands for cultivation to his subjects to ensure self-sufficiency in his subjects.
4. A Chief should decide all cases of civil and criminals disputes of his village in accordance with the district rules.
5. It was the duty of every chief got supervise the works of the khawchhiar of their respective village.
6. The Chiefs should act on and comply with the orders communicated to him.
7. It was the duty of Chiefs to maintain inter-village paths properly. They should also see the areas under the jurisidction were kept clean throughout the year.
8. The Chiefs must sign the House Tax Assessment Register maintained by the circle interpreters of the government.
9. The Chiefs should report to the Headquarters of all incidents of epidemics, crimes, violent deaths etc. within their respective jurisdiction.
10. Every chief should see that a list of all gun-holders of his village was properly maintained by his khawchhiar.
11. It was also the duty of the chief to see that no foreigners stayed or halted in his village without a pass issued by the superintendent.
12. No Chief should accept dawvankaina, a gift from his subject with the expectation of carrying out a favour.
13. The Chiefs in no case should raise subscriptions from the villagers to build corrugated iron roofed houses for their own use. Making of Chief's house should be according to custom.
14. A Chief and his subjects might collect funds for constructions of public importance such as bridges, schools, etc. This fund should be kept on record by the Chief of his khawchhiar. Works to be done in collecting funds on such projects must be on a voluntary basis.

Superintendent A.G. McCall also introduced the new policy of a chief's Durbar or council in 1939. It was a representative body of three chiefs from each circled consisting of 10-20 chiefs to be elected via private ballot. Nag argues this led to the decline of the power and prestige of the chiefs. In 1947 under Superintendent A.R.H. MacDonald, the Chief's durbar was expanded into the Mizo district council with commoners allowed to participate.

=== Chieftainship during Indian Rule ===
After Indian independence, the Indian constitutions permitted autonomy at both regional and local levels for chieftainships to manage their natural resources. The pre-independence superintendent of the Lushai Hills, L.L Peters, remained in position after the declaration of Indian independence. The policy of chiefly privilege was perpetuated with corruption, and his policies would safeguard the chiefs and their interests. The superintendent also allowed chiefs to report misbehaving subjects for punishment; this led to many members of the Mizo Union becoming targeted by chiefs and being arrested subsequently. Peters directly involved himself in the early period of Mizo politics by siding with the UMFO. Chatterjee argues that this is due to a support of the proposed crown colony scheme for the excluded areas to be possible with UMFO rule. Due to this Peters continued a policy of persecution of the Mizo Union similar to his predecessor A.R.H MacDonald who was transferred on the efforts of Saprawnga.

The Mizo Union organised an ultimatum of non-cooperation if Superintendent Peters was not removed from his post. Upon submitting a memorandum to the Government of Assam, the leaders of the Mizo Union were arrested. After the deadline for the ultimatum passed, supporters of the Mizo Union stopped obeying orders of the superintendent, stopped supplying taxation to their chiefs and halted all supply of labour as coolies to the administration. A massive crackdown with large-scale arrests and fines was imposed in retaliation for the protest. However, in the end, their boycott movement against Peters was successful and he was transferred out of Aizawl.

After the passing of the Assam Autonomous District Council Act 1951, the Lushai Hills district possessed more political agency in its domestic affairs. The Mizo Union secured dominance in the Lushai Hills Autonomous District. The superintendent positions was abolished and replaced with a weaker deputy commissioner role that would affect the chieftain's leverage with political policies.

=== Abolishment of chieftainship ===
The onset of Christianity saw a change in the traditional institutions of Mizo society, such as slavery and chieftainship. As more individuals and chiefs converted to Christianity, they released the Bawis or slaves held under their possession. However poorer, rural and destitute areas continued the tradition of maintaining bawis under their possession. One of the central figures to protest chieftainship and the bawi system was Hmar Khawbung Bawichuaka. The influence of Christianity made it so that the slave system of Mizo society was obsolete. However, this further stratified Mizo society as commoners were now bound in virtual serfdom to the chief.

The Mizo union would win all three seats to the Assam assembly in the 1952 general election. The following election in the same year saw the Mizo Union win all 3 of the seats in the Assam assembly and 15 districts secured out of 18. The first bill passed by the Mizo Union was the Lushai Hills (Chieftain Abolition) Act, 1952. It suspended the powers and rights afford by chiefs while allowing the continuation of their office and political structure. On the 1st of June 1953, the district council passed an act abolishing the taxations of thirdengsa, khuaichhiah and chikhuchhiah. The coolie system was also abolished on 1 January 1953. The Lushai Hills District Act no.III reduced the fathang (paddy tax) from six tins to 3 tins. The Lushai Hills Act (Acquisition of Chief's Rights) 1954 abolished chieftainship. The final legislation was the Lushai Hills Reorganisation of Chiefs' Rights Act 1954 which abolished the powers and privileges that chiefs held onto. The LHA came into force in 1958 while the RCRA came into effect April 1956, 259 Lushai chiefs and 50 Pawi-Lakher chiefs were affected by the act and village councils were established instead.

== See also ==
- Mizo Culture
- Bawi system
- Mizo religion
- History of Christianity in Mizoram

== Sources ==
- Chatterjee, Suhas (1985). Mizoram under British Rule. Delhi: Mittal Publications.
- Hluna, John Vanlal (1985). Church and political upheaval in Mizoram. Aizawl: Mizoram History Association.
- Mackenzie, Alexander (1884). History Of The Relations Of The Government With The Hill Tribes Of The North-east Frontier Of Bengal. Calcutta: Home Department Press.
- Zorema, J. (2007). Indirect Rule in Mizoram: 1890-1954. New Delhi: Mittal Publications. ISBN 978-81-8324-229-5. OCLC 271837683. OL 48056042M.
- Zorema, James (2021). The South Lushai Hills. Delhi: Mittal Publications.
