= Frederick George Lister =

British Military Officer (1790-1870)

Lieutenant-General Frederick George Lister
- Born: January 1, 1790; St George Hanover Square, Westminster, Middlesex
- Died: February 28, 1870 (aged 80); St. Helier, Jersey
- Burial place: Parish Church of St Helier
- Spouse(s): Harriete Hamilton Pearson (m. 1817) 2 unknown local wives in India
- Children: 6
- Relatives: Richard Lister (Father); Katherine Lister (Mother)
- Military career
- Allegiance: British East India Company, United Kingdom
- Branch: Army
- Service years: 1806-1869
- Rank: Lieutenant General
- Unit: Sylhet Light Infantry
- Known for: Father of the Sylhet Light Infantry
- Conflicts: Nepal War; Third Anglo-Maratha War; First Anglo-Burmese War; Lister Expedition

Frederick George Lister (1 January 1790 – 28 February 1870) was a military officer and political agent of the Khasi Hills during the British Raj. Captain Lister is considered the Father of the Sylhet Light Infantry Regiment with his 20-year command.

== Early life ==
Frederick George Lister was born on 1 January 1790 to Richard Lister and Katherine Lister. He was the oldest child from his three other siblings which consisted of a brother, Henry Lister and two sisters, Charlotte Lister (m. Bond) and Katherine Lister (m. King). As a cadet, Lister would join the East India Company's armed forces.

== Career ==
Lister's first posting would be to the 26th Bengal Native Infantry which participated in the Anglo-Nepal War and the Third Anglo-Maratha War. Lister would then be briefly transferred to the 52nd Bengal Native Infantry to participate in the First Anglo-Burmese War in 1824. In January 1825 Lister would be appointed second-in-command of the newly raised 16th Sylhet Local Battalion. Lister would become the commander of the Sylet Local Battalion on 14 March 1828. He would remain in command for 26 years until 17 July 1854. For this, he is regarded as the father of the Regiment. As commander of the Sylhet Light Infantry Lister would command a fight with the Khasis in 1829 and 1836. Lister would also lead an expedition against the Lushai Hills in 1850.

=== Khasi Expedition ===
During the construction of roads in Assam, Khasi labourers were employed to construct infrastructure. For 18 months, no issues were arisen as the road continued to be built. However, during a quarrel, a Bengali worker taunted the Khasis that the road would allow the British to subjugate them and enforce taxes on them. As a result, the party made an attack. Lieutenant Bedingfield was enticed into a conference where he was ambushed and killed. Lieutenant Burlton defended himself against higher numbers all day before fleeing in the direction of Gauhati; however, he was overtaken and killed by his followers. David Scott, the governor-general of Assam, managed to avoid the massacre by setting out shortly before the rising.

Frederick Lister was summoned from Sylhet along with another batch of troops from Kamrup. Lister advanced with artillery in 1829 from Sylhet. The march into the Khasis Hills was straining on the force due to the terrain but Lister avoided rest for the journey. Encounters with Khasis would see them dodge the British forces and ambush them in surprise night attacks before the British could set up a position. As a result, Lister proposed to David Scott to give the Khasi chief of Cherapunji a land grant in Sylhet (Bholanganj) in return for acquiring land for the office complex of the political agent at Cherrapunji. This proposal was found agreeable by Fort William in 1830. This lightened the burdens of the Khasi expedition as the chief of Cherrapunji was won over. However, anti-British Khasi warriors managed to continue inflicting casualties on British forces. To raise morale, Lister proposed an increment of allowances to government employees, to which the government of India agreed. The Khasis made counter-raids in British territory, which affected the confidence of British subjects on the border. However, Lister's determination and leadership successfully captured and defeated the chiefs individually. On 9 January 1833, Tirot Sing Syiem, the ringleader of the Khasi resistance, surrendered, which led to the pacification of the Khasi Hills. The chiefs retained a level of independence but had to submit to the control of a political agent who would be stationed in the hills and dealt with all cases of a criminal nature as well as construct roads, bridges, infrastructure and bungalows when necessary. Captain Lister was the first political officer of the Khasi Hills. As a result Lister moved his headquarters from Sylhet to Cherrapunji, where he would remain for 30 years.

=== Annexation of Jaintia Kingdom ===
After the Burmese war, the unstable conditions lead to the Jaintia Kingdom encroaching on the undefined British borders in the Nowgong district. The British repeatedly called on King Ram Singh to remove an outpost established under him between 1830 and 1832 at Chapparmukh. The king continued to evade cooperation with the British on the matter. The matter escalated further when the Raja of Gobha, who was a chieftain vassal to the Jaintia kingdom, kidnapped four British subjects. The subjects were then sacrificed via immolation at the shrine of Kali. One of the four subjects escaped and could report the situation to the British. However, the death of Ram Singh led his nephew Rajendra Singh to take the throne. The British attempted to encourage Rajendra Singh to give up the perpetrators of the offence and warned him of the consequences of non-compliance. The situation escalated when similar attempts to kidnap British subjects in Sylhet were brought to light. As a result, the British decided to dispossess the king and annex the Jaintia kingdom.

Robertson, the political officer of the Jaintia Kingdom, instructed Lister and Lister's son-in-law, Inglish, to make an economic assessment for the Jaintia Raj. Lister informed Robertson the revenue of the kingdom amounted to ₹30,000 annually with a total treasury of 20 lakhs. This assessment led to Robertson imposing a heavy tribute on the Raja and recommendation of his disposition. In March 1835, Rajendra Singh was informed of the confiscation of his property in the plains.

On 15 March 1835, Lister, with two companies of the Sylhet Light Infantry, took formal possession of Jaintiapur and formally annexed the kingdom into British territory. This was achieved by occupying the capital of Jaintiapur. The chieftain of Gobha, who perpetrated the original sacrifice, was caught a few weeks later in Nowgong by the Assam Light Infantry. The Jaintia territories were placed under the political officer of the Khasi Hills. The annexation saw the revolt of hill tribes from the Jaintia territories, which led to Lister suppressing the rising and granting a liberal peace settlement with them as a result. The policy of the hillmen became of non-interference, and they were not taxed as a result.

=== Political Officer of the Khasi Hills ===
==== Tripura controversy ====
After the Blackwood Expedition of 1944, a raid was followed by the Lushais in 1847. The district magistrate of Sylhet sent the Sylhet Light Infantry to the frontier to restore confidence among the demoralized villagers. The Sylhet authorities blamed the King of Hill Tipperah, Krishna Kishore Manikya of dereliction of duty. While the political agent of Tripura and Sylhet authorities argued responsibility over the raid, a second raid hit in 1848. Cooper, the magistrate of Sylhet, was accused of being irresponsible and pinning the blame of the incident on the Tripura King. Colonel Lister was assigned to institute an enquiry into the matter under Lord Dalhousie on Cooper's conduct in Sylhet.

Dalhousie composed a letter on 24 January 1848 instructing Lister. The letter empowered Lister to conduct the enquiry, and following proceedings, it may lead to. If the enquiry confirmed the responsibility of the Lushai-Kukis for the attacks, then Lister was also empowered to arrange a punitive expedition against the perpetrators. If the matter was considered a squabble, then a civil administration punishment should be granted instead. The King of Tripura was also obligated to aid Lister in any punitive expedition he was to undertake for this reason. If the Raja were not to support Lister or form opposition, then Lister would be permitted to treat him as a possible enemy. The Superintendent of Police, Lower Provinces, were also formally instructed to aid Lister. Furthermore, J.H. Maxwell was originally meant to serve under Lister but became engaged in the heavy construction of roads in Chittagong.

Lister's investigation saw him visiting Lalmee Singh after marching from Kailashur. Further analysis of the areas of attack began to show ownership issues or the boundary between Tripura and Sylhet. Lister reported the ill-defined boundary as a reason for the disagreement between Tripura and Sylhet. As a result, Mr Ewing, the magistrate of Sylhet, declared the villages and ranges called the Siddheswar and Sevallia Hills to become company territory. As a result after another dispute on the territory the matter was resolved as the locations of the massacres were undoubtedly in the domain of Hill Tipperah. Halliday the secretary of Bengal praised Lister for his service and requested the military board to submit a plan for drawing the boundary between the East India Company and Tripura. As a result of this the boundary between Sylhet and Tripura was clearly defined to avoid future complications.

==== Lushai Hills Expedition ====
Captain Vener, the Superintendent of Cachar, on 21 November 1849, sent a letter to Lister with evidence collected from two kukis who were victims of the raid. According to the testimony and evidence, the attackers were principal chief Lalingbhoo and his two sons, Barnerlal and Lalpoe. Chief Salpoe cooperated with the British and received subsistence from the government. As a result of the relationship, Salpoe supplied coolies to help with the construction of roads in the border region. Salpoe's upa met with Vernon personally in his court in Cachar.

As a result of the letter, Lister as political agent of the Khasi Hills informed the Secretary of the Bengal Government, J.P. Grant on 31 December that he would visit the massacre at Roopa Chera to determine if the location was in British territory. The investigation upon arrival revealed it to be undoubtedly in British territory. The crime was committed by Lushais occupying the land northeast of the Chittagong Frontier. The Tripura king claimed no authority over the Lushais in this case. Lister was informed of the terrain of the Lushai Hills which was mostly dense jungle. As a result, a decision was made not to take extensive supplies and to carry only essentials.

The expedition began on 1 January 1850. Lister approached the capital settlement of the Lushai chief Mora on 14 January. The Sylhet Light Infantry took the village by surprise. On 16 January, they burnt the village and retired from the expedition soon after. Lister reported on the expedition and recommended that allowing the detachment to stay and continue would endanger the regiment. The Lushai Hills had no roads or infrastructure, and to venture deeper would cut off vital supply lines. Mora was designated the perpetrator of the raid as, in his house, belongings of the Tripura villages massacred were found and dated 1849. The letter also reported the freeing of 400 slaves under Mora into the plains of Cachar. Lister advised for future expeditions concerning the Lushai Hills to field a bigger force and to use Cachar as the easiest base of operations.

==== Inglish Company ====
After the departure of the Lindsey Company, which focussed on lime and saltpetre within Sylhet in 1789, Robert Reid and George Inglish set up the Reid and Inglish Company in 1794. George's eldest son, Harry Inglish, became the sole proprietor after his brother John sold out his shares to Harry. The East India Company appointed Harry Inglish as assistant political agent of the Khasi Hills under List between 1835 and 1850. Harry would inherit the position of political agent of the Khasi Hills during the Lister expedition against Mora. Harry would marry Lister's daughter and become his son-in-law. Harry left his government job and focussed on commerce as his company grew. His company saw employment of Khasi and Jaintia workers with many influential Khasis engaged as agents. Lister took advantage of this by distributing monetary favour and spreading the network of spies in the Khasi and Jaintia Hills.

Lister would relinquish his post in 1854, leading the Commissioner of Assam to abolish the office with a new post as Principal Assistant Commissioner of Assam. Lister surveyed the land and discovered coal and limestone mines in the Khasi Hills. The survey led to Lister cooperating with authorities at Fort William, leading to R.G Hadden and his company drilling petroleum by the British government. The lister would also engage with an orange plantation and export it to Calcutta. He would return to England as a wealthy man after investing in shares of different companies in close connection with managing houses in Calcutta.

=== Later career ===
Later on, Lister was appointed Colonel of the 31st Bengal Native Infantry on 13 April 1855. He would then be promoted to major-general on 22 August 1857. He was further promoted to lieutenant-general on 23 August 1869.

== Family ==
Frederick George Lister would marry Harriet Hamiton Pearson on 10 March 1817. They would have three kids: Colonel Frederick Durham Lister, Eliza Matilda Lister (m. Taylor) and James Augustus Lister. Lister would also have children with two unknown local women in India. He would have a daughter named Sophie Guthrie, described as Eurasian, born before his first marriage in 1817. he would also have a son in 1853 with a local woman of the last name Nongkynrih, who'd be named Dorkha Nonkyrnih as tradition named by the mother's clan.

== Death ==
Frederick George Lister would die on 5 March 1870 from heart disease in St Helier in the Channel Islands. His probate would be executed by his granddaughter's husband Charles Nicholson on 7 April 1870 in Sussex, England.

== Sources ==
- Chatterjee, Suhas (2009). Frontier Officers in Colonial Northeast India. New Delhi: Akansha Publishing. ISBN 978-81-8370-168-6.
- Gait, Edward (1926). History of Assam. Calcutta and Simla: Thacker, Spink & Co.
- Griffin, Charles. "8th Gurkha Rifles:44th Sylhet Light Infantry". The British Empire.
- Jersey Heritage. "Burial Register of St Helier Parish Church. Entry for Frederick George Lister, aged 81 years". Jersey Heritage. St Heliers.
- Mackenzie, Alexander (1884). History of the Relations of the government with the Hill Tribes of the North-East Frontier of Bengal. Calcutta: Home Department Press.
- McSkimming, Kevin. "Royal Scottish Ancestree: Frederick George Lister". MyHeritage.
- Morning Post (31 December 1870). "Births, Deaths, Marriages and Obituaries". Morning Post. No. 30285. London. p. 6.
- The British Empire. "Captain Frederick Lister". The British Empire.
