= 44th Merwara Infantry =

- Active: 1824-1922
- Country: Indian Empire
- Branch: Army
- Type: Infantry
- Part of: Bengal Army (to 1895); Bengal Command
- Colors: Red; faced green 1870 French grey, 1891 yellow
- Engagements: Central India; 1879 - 80 Afghanistan

The 44th Merwara Infantry was an infantry regiment of the British Indian Army. They could trace their origins to 1824, when the Sylhet Light Infantry was raised. This first 44th eventually became the 44th Gurkhas and later 8th Gurkha Rifles.

The Mhairwara Local Battalion became a civil unit in 1861, but returned to a military role as the Mhairwara Battalion in 1871. It became the 44th Merwara Infantry in 1903, after the Kitchener reforms of the Indian Army. During World War I the regiment was part of the 12th Indian Division and took part in the Battle of Shaiba, the Battle of Khafajiya and the Battle of Nasiriya in the Mesopotamia Campaign.

Further reforms of the army were undertaken after World War I and nine single battalion regiments were disbanded. Being one of the nine, the 44th Merwara Infantry were disbanded on 20 June 1921.

== Previous names ==
- The Mhairwara Local Battalion - 1822
- 14th (Mhairwara) Local Battalion - 1823
- 9th (Mhairwara) Local Battalion - 1826
- The Mhairwara Battalion - 1843
- The Ajmer and Mhairwara Police Corps - 1861
- The Mhairwara Battalion - 1871
- 44th Merwara Infantry - 1903

== See also ==
- Frederick George Lister
