= Saizahawla =

Mizo Pasalṭha (c. 1858–1910)

Pasalṭha Saihazawla Hmar
- Born: 1858; Khawruhlian
- Died: 1910 (aged 51–52); Seling
- Cause of death: Poisoning
- Burial place: Seling Lungsen
- Spouse: Thangzingpuii
- Relatives: Chalpuaa (Father); Tuahnuaii (Mother)
- Military career
- Allegiance: Pâwibâwia
- Known for: Folk Hero of the Lushais
- Conflicts: Lushai Expedition; Chhak leh Thlang Indo; Lushai Rising

Pasalṭha Saizahawla (1858–1910) was a Mizo warrior renowned for his strength and prowess as a wrestler and athlete. Saizahawla participated in the Lushai Expedition, the Chhak leh Thlang Indo and the Lushai Rising. He completed various feats of strength throughout his life and was a pasalṭha of Pâwibâwia.

== Early life ==
Saihazawla was born in 1858 to Chalpuaa and Tuahnuii of the Hmar tribe. 1858 is the most agreed-upon year as Saizahawla was born no later than 1860 and around the time of the Chhim leh Hmar Indo. Various locations of his birth have been given, such as Zawngin and Kawlkulh. However, most historians agree that he was born and spent most of his time at Khawruhlian under Chief Pâwibâwia. It is reputed that from childhood, Saihazawla carried significant strength. When he was able to support himself standing up it is said he was able to seize the hair of a dog licking him and throw it on the floor. Saizahawla was forced to hide his strength for a while as it was believed that extraordinary individuals became targeted by witchcraft. Saihazawla learnt to wrestle at home by himself instead of most other boys who would learn in the zawlbuk. He wrestled with the boys in the zawlbûk and became a champion to the point that Pâwibâwia made him his right-hand man during tours. Upon coming of age Saihazawla chose an occupation as a blacksmith and Mizo priest.

== Feats of strength ==
Saizahawla made his first feat of strength at Khawruhlian when he moved a big chawilung. The chawilung was in front of the zawlbûk and was so large that no one made an attempt to lift it. Saizahawla used it as a shotput for three nights but once told the stone was a chawilung he could not lift it. This happened once more at the village of chawilung during the East-West War.

During a festival, Pâwibâwia was about to toss a rifle before the attendees of the khuangchawi feast. The young men tried to snatch the gun from Saizahawla by subduing him with the ten strongest men, but Saizahawla overcame them and claimed the gun. Another incident, Saizahawla wrestled with a group of men from Zawlnghak, a village with 1000 houses. Saizahawla wrestled for the whole night and defeated everyone who duelled with him.

== Pasalṭha ==
=== Hmar war ===
After his village was raided by a Hmar enemy raiding party, Saihazawla chased after the raiders by himself. The Hmar raiding party crossed the boundary of Manipur and attacked a man named Ngurdailova in his village and took his head as a trophy. While the villagers chased them they could not catch the party. Saizahawla followed the party and reached the Hmar region. During the chase in the jhum fields, Saihazawla managed to slay a raider and take the head. However, before he could take the head to his village, the rest of the raiding party began to pursue him. He passed the Parvachawm village and spotted a man from Leisenzo village felling trees. He timed the shot as the tree fell to avoid the gunshot, alerting all other members. However, the sound was still registered, and upon questioning, Saizahawla declared that he had shot a tiger. However, the youth of the village declared what happened, and a manhunt was made for Saizahawla. Saizahawla used the darkness of dusk and spoke the Hmar language to pretend to be party of the manhunting party and continued to misdirect the individuals before heading home with the head of his victim. Another account states, Saihazawla did not know the countryside well and decided to hide. On the assumption that the raiders would think he would run to his village, Saihazawla walked towards the opposite direction and hid in a bush. Despite a lengthy search, the raiders could not find Saihazawla. Exhausted from the search, the raiders left, and Saihazawla made his journey home. The journey took three days and one night, he was followed by a tiger, but he continued to encamp with the head of his enemy. The village granted him a hero's welcome. Chief Pawibawia, in reward of Saihazawla's bravery, conferred him the privilege of first selection of jhum plots and a house site in the village. Ngurdailova's mother spread a new Pawnpui for him to sit on and his neck was full of arkeziak (a white cotton spun necklace/bracelet for headhunters). Pâwibâwia's wife, Rohlupuii tied a thihna around his neck.

Another time, Saihazawla and two of his friends Khawzathanga and Ekchhetea went on a headhunting expedition towards some Hmar villages. At Pherzawl in Manipur, Saihazawla decided to test the fighting power of the village. He entered the zawlbuk where he was unrecognized and waited for everyone to sleep. Going forward with his plan, Saihazawla went to each house and poured water down the barrels of the guns except for three which he would take as trophies. Saizahawla's friends decided to tell their chief that the headhunting succeeded, but it was too distant to carry the heads, hence they took the guns. Under the confidence of the lie, they would receive a muallam, a headhunting festival for successful warriors. The festival required proof of hair, scalp or a head in order to be demanded of the village. Saihazawla did not respond to the scheme his friends had planned which they assumed for him to be complicit. They also made a promise that if the truth was revealed a fine of one mithun would have to be paid.

Saihazawla and his friends arrived, and a festival was prepared; however, Saihazawla did not make an appearance. When a messenger was sent for him, Saihazawla exposed the truth to the village. His friends who demanded a find of one mithun was rebuffed by Saihazawla who stated that each of them received a gun from him worth more than a mithun.

=== Lushai Expedition ===
During the Lushai Expedition, Pâwibâwia opposed the Northern column from his settlements of Selam and Sesawng in 1872. On 25 January 1872, heavy open fire between Pâwibâwia and the Cachar Column allowed Saizahawla to play a significant role in the conflict, but it was overrun and occupied by the British on 2 February 1872.

=== East-West War ===
The east–west war emerged between the descendents of Vûta and Mângpawrha with a battle code of direct confrontation. Saizahawla with his friend Vuntawia vowed to not be the first to retreat during a hunt of a wounded tiger. However, when Vungtawia retreated by one step, Saizahawla decided to rais Hmawngkawn on his own without Vungtawia. Saizahawla reached Hmawngkawn and opened fire on the fortified stockade and shouted at them to shoot him as he would honor the battle code of not being a hit and run warrior. Saizawhawla in the confrontation misdirected the villagers to another direction.

=== Lushai Rising ===
After the annexation of the Lushai Hills under the Chin-Lushai Expedition, the Eastern Lushais of Lalburha and Pâwibâwia revolted against the British. Saizahawla participated in the resistance. Saizahawla during a battle laid at the root of the tree and did not open fire. When the British were massacred he ran towards the boat and captured two guns and gave one to his friend Lalzika.

=== British era ===
Once in Aizawl, Saizhawla went to the market where a Pawi (Lushai: Lai) named Thanhranga had also come to collect commodities. Hrangkima, a shop owner, saw both strong men and gave them an iron bar to pull on, and the winner could keep it. Both men exerted their strength, with Saizahawla offering to break it in half to share. Thanhranga, however, offered a second try. This time, Saizawhawla won the iron rod with one hand.

In traditional Mizo sports, Saihazawla was reputed to be unbeatable. This was especially noted in javelin throw, shotput and wrestling. Despite being a champion, Saihazawla followed a code of honour to not humiliate his opponents. He would tend to carry 1.5 maunds of stones in bags on him. One story retells how Saihazawla pushed down a bamboo grove uprooted during a cyclone by himself despite other groups of villagers failing. In wrestling, Saihazawla also fought animals. He fought a mihthun and a bison which he would throttle with their horns and win. After the British takeover in the Chin-Lushai Expedition, the British would introduce tug of war. Saihazawla would also master himself the champion of this sport.

Superintendent Major Granville Henry Loch invited seventy chiefs and their best champions to participate in a tug of war competition. Saihazawla was one of the invitees and his team won every round. Some rumours were spread that some teams could not beat Saihazala on his own. In the finals of the tournament, Saihazawla's team were meant to fight with the Indian soldiers, but Loch called it off to not disrepute the military. Saizahawla instead made his name known by singlehandedly winning a tug of war with ten Punjabi workers.

During an altercation with Assamese riflemen, they attempted to steal Saizahawla's cucumber which led him to carry both in the air with one hand each and to leave him be. Another incident recounts at Seling how thirty men asked Saizahawla's help to pull a large log from below but he did it himself.

== Village roles ==
Saizahawla was also a priest and a blacksmith at Khawruhlian. He would not hold sacrifices to heal the adult patients of the village but always interrupted his work for children. As a blacksmith, Saizahawla forged agricultural tools and war weapons.

== Death ==
Saihazawla, in his later years, migrated from Seling to Khawruhlian. A small village was established by the British to provide labour for public works projects, which Saihazawla, in his old age, contributed to with ease. Saihazawla died via poisoning from Manipuri Hmar tribesmen. His death is estimated to have occurred in 1910. His tombstone is at Seling Lungsen site. Saizahawla had three sons, Thanama, Thanseia and Thansanga with one daughter, Lalzawmi.

== Legacy ==
Saihazawla was one of the Pasalṭha names chosen for the battalions of the Dagger Bridge under the Mizo National Front uprising.

== Sources ==
- Goswami, B.B (1979). The Mizo Unrest: A Study of Politicisation of Culture. Jaipur: Aalekh Publishers.
- Remruatkimi, C. (2017). "Saizahawla" (PDF). Historical Journal of Mizoram. XVIII (1).
- Lalbiakthanga (1978). The Mizos: A study in racial personality. United Publishers.
- Nibedon, Nirmal (2013). Mizoram: The Dagger Brigade. Atlanta, Georgia: Lancer Publishers. ISBN 978-1-935501-82-4.
- Zawla, K. (1964). Mizo Pi Pute leh an thlahte Chanchin. Aizawl: Gosen Press.
