= Roger Gaikwad =

General Secretary of the National Council of Churches in India

Roger Gaikwad, PCI
- Born: 13 February 1953 (age 73); Mumbai, Maharashtra, India
- Education: B.A. {honours (special)} (Bombay University), B. D., M. Th., D. Th. {Senate of Serampore College (University)}
- Occupation: Theologian
- Church: Mizoram Presbyterian Church Synod
- Ordained: Deacon: 1976 by Methodist Church in India; Minister: 1981 by Mizoram Presbyterian Church Synod
- Congregations served: English Methodist Church, Jabalpur (1977-1978), English Congregation Church, Aizawl (1978-2002),
- Offices held: Professor, Aizawl Theological College, Aizawl (1978-2002), Director, Senate Centre for Extension and Pastoral Theological Research of the Senate of Serampore College, Kolkata (2003-2006), Principal, Aizawl Theological College, Aizawl (2008-2010)
- Title: The Reverend Doctor

Roger Gaikwad (born 13 February 1953) was General Secretary of the National Council of Churches in India (comprising Protestant and Orthodox Church Societies in India) and has been in office from 2010 through 2019.

Gaikwad also served as a Senator of the Senate of Serampore College (University), the nation's first University from 2011-2014 representing the Presbyterian Church.

== Studies ==
After Gaikwad's graduate studies at the Wilson College, Mumbai, he was awarded a Bachelor of Arts degree in honours (special) by the Bombay University. For ministerial formation, Gaikwad enrolled at the Leonard Theological College, Jabalpur, a Seminary where the Old Testament Scholar Wolfgang Roth once taught, affiliated to the nation's first University as a Methodist student from where he obtained a Bachelor of Divinity degree awarded by the Senate of Serampore College (University) after his three-year course from 1974–1977. During Gaikwad's stint at the Aizawl Theological College, Aizawl, he went on study leave and enrolled at the North India Institute for Post Graduate Theological Studies, a joint initiative of the Bishop's College, Kolkata and the Serampore College, Serampore where he pursued a Master of Theology degree specialising in Religions. During the penultimate year of his study, Gaikwad moved to Bangalore and pursued a one-year special course at the United Theological College, Bangalore in 1981, then under the Principalship of Joshua Russell Chandran, where he worked on his dissertation entitled Karma and Transmigration in Modern Hinduism: An evaluation of the interpretation of the concepts of the thought of M. K. Gandhi, Aurobindo and S. Radhakrishnan.

For doctoral studies, Gaikwad joined the South Asia Theological Research Institute where he researched and worked out a dissertation entitled Major Issues in Dialogical Pluralism for Inter-relationship. after which the Senate of Serampore College (University) under the Registrarship of D. S. Satyaranjan awarded him a Doctor of Theology degree in 1995.

== Ecclesiastical ministry ==
Gaikwad was a Teacher at the Aizawl Theological College, Aizawl from 1978 through 2010. From 2002 through 2008, Gaikwad went on leave and served as Director of the Senate Centre for Extension and Pastoral Theological Research of the Senate of Serampore College in Kolkata and returned in 2008 to take over as the Principal of the Aizawl Theological College.

== Writings ==
- 1997, Rethinking Indian Christianity From A Tribal Perspective
- 2002, Forces of communalism in India
- 2002, Issues in Christian Relationships with People of Other Faiths in Asia
- 2004, Diversified Theological Education,
- 2006, Some stances of Christians on integrating peace concerns in our lives
- 2006, The Jubilee - an Alternative to Globalisation - (Luke 4:16-21 and Leviticus 25)
- 2008, The Extension Programme of the Senate of Serampore College

== Honorary commitments ==
Gaikwad was Chairperson of the World Student Christian Federation, Asia Pacific Region from 2005 through 2008. In fact Gaikwad had already been Chairperson of the Student Christian Movement of India during the terms 1996–2001 and again 2003–2005.

As General Secretary of the National Council of Churches in India, Gaikwad is ex officio member of the following ecclesiastical organisations,

- Board of Theological Education of the Senate of Serampore College, Bangalore,
- Council of Management of the Christian Literature Society, Chennai,
- Henry Martyn Institute, Hyderabad.

Educational offices
| Preceded by Post created | Director, Senate Centre for Extension and Pastoral Theological Research of the Senate of Serampore College, Kolkata; 2003-2006 | Succeeded by Wati A. Longchar; 2006- |
Academic offices
| Preceded by H. Vànlalauva; 1999-2007 | Principal, Aizawl Theological College, Aizawl; 2008-2010 | Succeeded by Vanlalchhuanawma; 2011- |
Religious titles
| Preceded by D. K. Sahu; 2005-2009 | General Secretary, National Council of Churches in India; 2010-2019 | Succeeded by Asir Ebenezer |
