= Mizo Revival of 1919 =

1919 Christian Revival in Mizoram

The Mizo Revival of 1919 was a Christian Revivalism movement in the Lushai Hills (Mizoram) among the Mizo people. The revival centred around the theme of Jesus's suffering during the Crucifixion. It was notable for the use of drums during the congregations and the proliferation of new denominations such as the Salvation Army and the Roman Catholic Church.

== Background ==
A revival was predicted by many who saw the conditions needed being fulfilled. Margaret Sandy, wife of Fred Sandy, stated that villages were encouraging and praying for revivals. Liangkhaia himself established the Kristian Beihram Pawl (transl. Christian Endeavour). The group had taken on a duty of conversions in 1918 at a Presbetery in Champhai. The group was mobilised for Christians to convert non-Christians. Since 10% of the Mizo population was Christian, the resolution stated that one person convert at least one person annually to make Mizoram completely Christian in ten years. In June 1918, 344 individuals were converted successfully.

== Revival ==
The Mizo Revival of 1919 began in three villages simultaneously on 26 July 1919 of Zotlang and Thingsai in the South, and Nisapui in the North. Despite the long distance between Nisapui and the other villages, the simultaneous burst of revival was described as a peculiar coincidence with striking similarities.

The movement spread not only in Mizoram but spilled into Hill Tipperah and Kingdom of Manipur. The themes of the Revival centred around the Suffering of Christ on the Cross and the love of God for mankind. The revival oversaw lovefests with singing and dancing.

At Nisapui, a three-page article was published by Rela in Kristian Tlangau September issue. For the Church elders to stimulate a revival, they had offered contribution of vegetables, cottage meetings and relieving volunteers for itinerant preaching. On 26 July 1919, four young women praying in a house experienced the stirring and watched the whole night. Sunday evening the stirring increased and different physical manifestations of faith were expressed by the delegates. After a week, several neighbouring villages joined from Khumi Khua (lungdai), Tawia Veng and Lianruma Veng (Thingkhuang).

After several days of religious revival in Nisapui, a large crowd gathered and made a visit to the neighbouring village of Lungdai. The Christians of Lungdai received the revival left to Durtlang. The Christians in Durtlang left for Mission Veng in Aizawl on 25 August led by the Christian Chief Suaka, where in total 4000 people converted from Mizo animism to Christianity. Following this, the whole of Mizoram was penetrated by the stirring after the spread from Mission Veng.

Lloyd argues the role of the drums during hymns and dance as a potent instrument, with some critics seeing it as displacing prayer, scripture and preaching by controlling the energy of the followers. Lalsawma argues that dancing representing the receiving of the Holy Spirit. After the meetings were finished, individuals would ask I lâm em? (transl. Did you dance?), which was a question alluding to whether they felt the spirit or not. Lalsawma argued that dancing was proof that an individual had received Christ as their faith.

In the south, Zotlang village had prayed for revivals since the beginning of 1919 on every Sunday. After the Zotlang Church visited the Lunglawn Church, they returned to hold their meeting on 26 July and began the revival when reciting the hymn "I'm not ashamed to own my Lord". The meeting continued all day and night until Monday morning. The revival spread to Pukpui with exchange visits for the revival fellowship. Following Pukpui, Theiriat was the next Christian village to be affected. The stirring that Thingsai was too intense for any details of the event to be accurately recorded apart from the fact it happened as the same hour and day as the other two sources of the revival and similar to the others in the beginning.

F.J. Sandy described the Presbytery of 1919 as the most wonderful he had experienced. Hundreds of people tried to enter the Aizawl chapel. The Church structure was reconfigured with new elders. Church reports outlined significant numbers of new converts, such as South Mizoram, growing from 3760 before the revival to 9000.

Several authors argue that the theme of the 1919 Revival centred upon the suffering of Christ on the Cross. Margaret Sandy recounts the words of preachers alluding to the topic of crucifixion. Lloyd and Lalsawma simiarlary agree on the Cross as the focus of the revival.

== Salvation Army ==
Kawlkhuma was an associate of Tlira, who had been excommunicated due to forming his own movement (Tlira Movement). Kawlkhuma was called to the presbytery where he dnied subscription to Tlira's teachings. Kawlkhuma was warned and was told to retract his schemes or else his Church Committee will be dismissed from Mission Veng Church. Kawlkhuma continued to attempt to preach and made sermons during Church meetings as well.

Kawlkhuma created a visible representation of his faith with a uniform for "God's Obeyers". No worldly ornaments such as bangles, earrings, necklaces, tobacco or alcohol were permitted. Kawlkhuma attempted to find a separate village for "God's Obeyers". They were introduced to the Salvation Army and were lent two publications which encouraged them to merge with them. Kawlkhuma was financed by a former Church member, Vanhlira, and went to Shimla to meet with the Salvation Army. Kawlkhuma was placed in an officer-training course at Byculla in Bombay at the Salvation Army Training College. Kawlkhuma worked in Uttar Pradesh since Assam was closed to the Salvation Army. With the Commissioner's permission, Kawlkhuma returned to Mizoram. He returned on April 26, 1917, when Lushai soldiers were being paraded off to France for World War One and this was marked as Salvation Army Day in Mizoram.

The Church disliked Kawlkhuma's movement hosting cottage and street meetings while boycotting the Church. Margaret Sanders argued Kawlkhuma to be a man of notoriety rather than faithful zeal in Christian ideals. The Church questioned Kawlkhuma to continue his faith and preach but refrain from teaching violating aspects for the Presbyterian faith. Kawlkhuma stated that he intended to start a new Church as he saw the Presbyterians as following heathen ideals of sacrifices and drinking. Kawlkhuma's familyand followers were removed from Mission Veng as a result. Chief Thamluaia of Sawleng granted the Salvation Army land for them to settle on. A hall was built and Kawlkhuma's financier Vanhlira brought drums. The Kawlkhuma during the revival period gradually became a denominal identity than a revival identity. Its number increased and cost membership in the Presbyterian Church. To reduce his influence during the revival, the Presbterian Church only allowed the Baptists to freely preach and for any other denomination to take express permission first.

The Salvation Army created evangelistic groups and launched a Beirual meiling (transl. fiery campaign). In the early twenties these proved successful and the first chief to convert into the Salvation Army was Lalthima of Tlangpui in March 1922. In 1923, the Commission of the Salvation Army gave control to the Welsh Mission and removed Kawlkhuma to Calcutta.

== Roman Catholicism ==
James Dokhuma contended that the Roman Catholic Church emerged in the revival of 1919, while authors such as Saiaithanga disagree and attribute it to the prevalence of Catholic literature discontentment with the Mission Church. When visiting Aichhunga in upper Shillong, Saiaithanga and his student met a Khasi Catholic and received two texts, which he presented to Aichhunga. The Khasi Gentleman was a farm manager known as Leo Herrick Singh. Aichhunga's cousin, Thangphunga and his friends Lianchheuva, Laldailova, Chalchhuna, Lenga, Laltura and Chhunruma planned to introduce Catholicism to Mizoram following the reading of the texts. They requested a Catholic Bishop in Shillong to send a priest to Aizawl. The Roman Catholic Church took advantage of the Revival to draw attention and grow their followers. Thangphunga and his friends officially started the Catholic Church in Mizoram on 1 February 1925 with 22 Catholics. In 1925 the first Catholic Missionary Fr. Philease Bouley came to Mizoram and stayed in Aizawl for one week with military escort under the Superintendent. Lorrain noted the issue of introducing several denominations to Mizoram for disorder and thus supported the superintendent's decision. Boulay baptised Mary Teresa Biakthangi (Lenga's daughter) and Jacob Francis Laldailova (Thangphunga's son) on 6 December 1925.

Thangphunga, Bula Tochhawng, Chawnga Hmar, Lianchheuva, Chalchhuna and Laltura took courses in Chittagong and returned as Catchechists in March 1926. The first chief to join the Roman Catholics was Saitulera Ralte of Kawnpui.

== Sources ==
- Lloyd, J. Meirion (1991). History of the Church in Mizoram: Harvest in the Hills. Synod Publication Board. pp. 17–23.
- Sangkima (2004). Essays on the History of the Mizos. Guwahati: Spectrum Publications. ISBN 81-87502-77-0.
- Vanlalchhuanawma (2007). Christianity and Subaltern Culture: Revival Movement as a Cultural Response to Westernisation in Mizoram. Delhi: Indian Society for Promoting Christian Knowledge. ISBN 978-81-7214-901-7.
