= Presbyterian Hospital =

Presbyterian Hospital may refer to:

- New York-Presbyterian Hospital, a hospital in New York City
- Presbyterian Hospital (New York City), one of the two hospitals that merged to form New York-Presbyterian
- Presbyterian Hospital (Charlotte), a hospital in Charlotte, North Carolina
- Presbyterian Hospital (Albuquerque), a hospital in Albuquerque, New Mexico
- Presbyterian Hospital (Chicago, Illinois), a hospital that merged with St. Luke's Hospital (Chicago, Illinois) (and later merged with Rush University Medical Center)
- Presbyterian Hospital (Dallas), a hospital in Dallas, Texas
- Presbyterian Hospital, Durtlang, a hospital in Aizawl, India
- UPMC Presbyterian, hospital of the University of Pittsburgh Medical Center in Pittsburgh, Pennsylvania
- Presbyterian Hospital, Ghana, a hospital in Ghana, Ashanti Region
