= Pâwibâwia =

Eastern Mizo chief (c.1852-c.1892)

- Chief of Sailam; Sailam Lal
- Predecessor: Lalphunga
- Successor: Vanphunga
- Born: c. 1852
- Died: 1892 (aged 39–40)
- House: Sailo
- Father: Lalphunga
- Mother: Lalpuithluaii
- Religion: Sakhua

Pâwibâwia (1852-1892) was a Mizo chief of the eastern Lushai Hills (now Mizoram). He was the son of Lalphunga and grandson of Lalsavunga. He participated in the resistance against the British forces during the Lushai Expedition and once more in the Lushai Rising with Lalburha.

== Early life ==
Pâwibâwia is estimated to have been twenty years old during the Lushai Expedition which would implies that his birth date is c. 1852. Pâwibâwia descended into a small family from his father Lalphunga and his mother Lalpuithluaii. During birth, his mother, desiring a blessing of fertility for a larger family gave birth to him in a Pawi (Lai) household of a big family under a man known as Damritvunga. He was made to wear the bangle of a bawi making him a nominal slave of the Pawi and hence his name Pâwibâwia.

His father Lalphunga shifted and migrated his subjects and villages, making Pâwibâwia shift from Tualbung, Kawlkulh, Rabung, Lamzawl, Khuangphah and finally Ngopa. Lalphunga died in Ngopa, and Pâwibâwia was made chief.

== Chieftainship ==
Pâwibâwia migrated his village and grew his influence beyond that of his father Lalphunga.

=== Lushai Expedition ===
Pâwibâwia contributed to raiding of British estates and workers on the borders of the Lushai Hills. He collaborated with his cousin Chief Vanhnuailiana to raid the Kala Naga Police Station in February 1868 and looted the village. Pâwibâwia made another raid with Chief Vanpuilala on a Naga village in the Manipur Kingdom. These raids were attributed to the expansion of tea estates in Assam, which encroached on the historical hunting grounds of the Lushais.

After the capture of Mary Winchester (Zoluti) by Chief Bengkhuaia, the British organised the Lushai Expedition of two columns. During the expedition, Pâwibâwia shifted his settlement to the village of Sailam while Vanpuilal was at Khawlian and Lalburha was at Champhai. Pâwibâwia sent an ultimatum for the British northern column to withdraw or else he would resist their entry into their lands. The British ignored the ultimatum and continued towards Sailam. Sailam was occupied by the British and overran the defences.

=== East-West War ===
Following the events of the Lushai Expedition, Pâwibâwia settled his village at Khawruhlian but due to issues with Chief Khalkama he moved to Thingsul Tlangnuam and Sesawng and settling in Zawngin.

However, the right to ownership of jhum farmlands led to the escalation of conflict. Skirmishes began to emerge, and eventually war was officially started with Chief Lianphunga shooting men who attempted to clear him away from the land claimed. The eastern chiefs attempted to involve the British as mediators to the conflict but all talks were in vain. Eventually the mautam famine encouraged Pâwibâwia and Khalkam to make peace. However the war would continue after the famine recovered.

=== Lushai Rising ===
Lalburha, who was influential among the Eastern Lushai Chiefs, began to resist the British with the Eastern Lushai Rising. Pâwibâwia was one of the chiefs hostile to the paying of taxes, along with Lalburha and Buangtheuva. Pâwibâwia attended a meeting of various chiefs held by Lalburha at Sesawng to plan the uprising.

Robert Blair McCabe moved against the village of Pâwibâwia and stormed it at over a high climb and captured it on 14 April 1892.

== Later life ==
After the East-West war, Pâwibâwiamoved to Khawruhlian and gained prestige for one of the biggest villages in the hills and possessing two zawlbûks. His prestige was also complimented with the presence of the pasalṭha Saizahawla in his village. Pâwibâwia had seven sons and a daughter from his wives and mistresses. Namely, Vanphunga, Thangkâma, Lalzika, Khawzadala, Lalruaia, Dorawta, Thawngliana and Vanhnuaiseli.

Pâwibâwia died in 1892 before R.B. McCabe made his second promenade of the chiefs.

== Genealogy ==
Eastern Lushai Chiefs Family Tree

Lallula
Mângpawrha	Lallianvunga	Lalpuiliana	Vûta	Neipuithangi
Suakpuilala	Ngûra	Lalphunga	Thâwmvunga	Lalsavunga
Vanpuilala	Pâwibâwia	Lalruma	Chenglena	Vanhnuailiana	Laltheri
Lalhleia	Doțhiauva	Liankhama	Ropuiliani	Lalburha	Buangtheuva
Thangkâma	Vanphunga	Lalruaia	Lalthuama
Langthanglula	Sanglura	Lalvunga	Lungliana	Kairûma	Lalkhûma

== Sources ==
- Chatterjee, Suhas (1985). Mizoram under British Rule. Delhi: Mittal Publications.
- Lalthangliana, B. (2005). Culture and Folklore of Mizoram. India: Publications Division.
- Lalthlengliana, C. (2010). "Chief Pawibawia" (PDF). Historical Journal of Mizoram. 11 (1).
- Mackenzie, Alexander (1884). History Of The Relations Of The Government With The Hill Tribes Of The North-east Frontier Of Bengal. Calcutta: Home Department Press.
- Reid, Robert (1942). The Lushai Hills: culled from History of the frontier areas bordering on Assam from 1883-1941. Calcutta: Firma KLM. p. 49.
- Sailo, Ngurthankima (2011). "Vanphunga Sailo: A Peculiar Chief (1868-1922)". Historical Journal of Mizoram. XII (1).
- Tribal Research Institute (1978). The Lushais 1878-1889. Aizawl: Firma KLM Private Limited.
