= Vanphunga =

Eastern Mizo chief (1868-1922)

- Chief of Khandaih; Khandaih Lal
- Reign: 1892-1922
- Predecessor: Pâwibâwia
- Successor: Awksarala
- Regent: Lalpuithluaii
- Born: 1868; Zawngin
- Died: July 15, 1922 (aged 53–54); Zawngin (Phullen)
- Spouse: Lalkaichhungi (d.1907); Thangnguri
- House: Sailo
- Father: Pâwibâwia
- Mother: Rohlupuii
- Religion: Sakhua; Christianity (after 1919)

Vanphunga (1868-15 July 1922) was an eastern Mizo chief during the British colonial era of the Lushai Hills. He was a persecutor of the early Mizo Christians following the Mizo Revival of 1906 and set a standard of persecution among Mizo chiefs. Later on in life, Vanphunga became a Christian with the Mizo Revival of 1919.

== Early life ==
Vanphunga was born in Zawngin in 1868 to Chief Pâwibâwia and his first wife Rohlupuii. He was the eldest of six brothers and a sister. After the death of his father, Vanphunga began to live with his paternal grandmother Lalpuithluaii,the chieftainess of Saitual. IN 1892, he formed his own village known as Saitual Keifang near Saitual and became a chief.

== Chieftainship ==
=== Lushai Rising ===
During the annexation of Mizoram after the Chin-Lushai Expedition, the British settled at Aizawl and continued to consolidate their rule of the region. Vanphunga opposed the authority of the British to override his sovereign right to rule as a chief and refused to cooperate with the British. He ordered his people not to fulfil demands made by the Lushai Hills superintendent.

His refusal to pay taxes and give coolies led to conflict and the defeat of Vanphunga. He was captured and imprisoned at Aizawl for four months in 1893. Vanphunga never ate food but accepted it when his people fed him. At the end of the four months, he was visited by Superintendent A.W. Davis, who requested him to sign with a thumbprint to show acceptance of British overlordship. Vanphunga accepted and was released.

=== British rule ===
Vanphunga shifted his village from Saitual Keifang to Rawkawn and Darchhun before settling in Sihfa in 1901. During his rule of Sihfa, his grandmother Lalpuithluaii died, and the village of Saitual moved under his chiefdom and grew to 550 houses, even bigger than Aizawl at the time.

After land reforms made by Superintendent John Shakespear, chiefs had demarcated boundaries and were encouraged to settle permanently and not extend or enlarge territories without permission. Vanphunga's brothers needed land for their settlement, so he moved east of the Tuivawl River, where he founded Khandaih (now Phullen) in 1901. However, after a cholera epidemic in Khandaih killed 50 people in 1905, Vanphunga shifted his village to avoid the spread of the disease and settled in Chawgzawl in 1906 after a brief move to Kawnpui.

=== Persecution of Christianity ===
With the developments of missionaries in education, the first permanent and regular school outside of Aizawl was opened in Khandaih in 1903. Lalruala (known as Hranga) was appointed the teacher. Hranga converted to Christianity and was baptised on 16 November 1902. He attempted to spread the gospel during school hours and attracted new converts.

Following the Mizo delegation's attendance at the Mairang Revival meeting in the Khasi Hills, they returned to Aizawl. The delegates attempted to spark the revival at the school chapel building without success. Before the southern Mizoram delegates left, they held a hymn "God be with you till we meet again". This hymn was repeated over and over until a large congregation formed.

Vanphunga originally did not hold any disposition towards the few Christians in his chiedom. However, the introduction of Christianity became a threat to his chieftainship. This is particular in references to the power of a chief via the manpower held in the institution of [[zawlbuk|zawlbûks]]. As Christiantiy spread, the institution of zawlbûk became obsolete. However, the cultural changes of converts refusing to sacrifice animals, suspended the consumption of zû and stopped participating in festivals. Vanphunga convened with his brothers and upas of the surrounding villages and began to persecute the spread of Christianity.

David Evan Jones visited Changzawl where Vanphunga was drunk and his sister was hidden away from her husband. Jones attempted to help his sister, but an altercation led to one of the chiefs punching Jones and insulting him. Jones attempted to baptise the Christians of Khandaih but Vanphunga's men chased them and threw hot coals from the heart at them. Jones however succeeded in baptising 30 individuals without interference the following day.

His methods set the standard for persecution of Christianity among the Mizo chiefs. Vanphunga began to disrupt the meetings of Christian gatherings and beat them to disperse them. Vanphunga decided on forced labour on Sundays despite the Sabbath day. He would also falsify and impose arbitrary fines on individuals. He encouraged men to beat Christian wives and children to recant their faith. More hostile actions included stripping young girls publicly and pouring ice-cold water on winter nights. The abuse of Chalbuanga led to his succumbing to his injuries and thus becoming the first martyr in Mizoram.

Vanphunga expelled the Christians and confiscated all the property they could not carry out. Vanphunga lost families in his chiefdom and the individuals became free agents who spread the gospel in the new villages that accepted them.

Superintendent H.W.G. Cole learnt of the persecutions under Vanphunga and relayed to his upas to cease the persecution immediately. However, the upas falsified the orders to not lose favour with Vanphunga. Vanphunga's son, Lalbuaia, who accompanied the upas once met with Cole and learnt that if the persecution wasn't ceased then Vanphunga's chieftainship would be abolished. Vanphunga abided with Cole's order and ended the persecution. Cole's visit to Vanphunga carried good will as he cleared a pathway linking Changzawl and Bualpui and was granted additional land.

=== Conversion to Christianity ===
Following the Mizo Revival of 1919, Vanphunga's attitude to Christianity changed. The death of his wife, Lalkaichhungi, in 1907 was seen as a punishment from the Christian God. His son from his second wife also died in his teens and further made him adopt a God-fearing demeanour. Vanphunga was stated to have had a vision of four handsome young men at his bed stating his name being recorded in the Book of Life. During the congregation of the Christian Revivalist, Vanphunga entered and many worshippers assumed he came to disrupt it. However, Vanphunga shared a testimony and his son Lalbuaia who was already converted had written a song which he recited. Vanphunga held a feast for the Christians out of his own pocket for his people.

== Later life ==
Vanphunga lived in the settlement of Zawngin (an extension of Khandaih) and died on 15 July 1922. His four sons, Lalbuaia, Awksarala, Liankiauva and Pianfela, survived him, and his four daughters, one of them being Lalthanzami. He was buried in Zawngin.

== Genealogy ==
Eastern Lushai Chiefs Family Tree

Lallula
Mângpawrha	Lallianvunga	Lalpuiliana	Vûta	Neipuithangi
Suakpuilala	Ngûra	Lalphunga	Thâwmvunga	Lalsavunga
Vanpuilala	Pâwibâwia	Lalruma	Chenglena	Vanhnuailiana	Laltheri
Lalhleia	Doțhiauva	Liankhama	Ropuiliani	Lalburha	Buangtheuva
Thangkâma	Vanphunga	Lalruaia	Lalthuama
Langthanglula	Sanglura	Lalvunga	Lungliana	Kairûma	Lalkhûma

== Sources ==
- Lloyd, J. Meirion (1991). History of the Church in Mizoram: Harvest in the Hills. Synod Publication Board. pp. 17–23.
- Vanlalchhuanawma (2007). Christianity and Subaltern Cuture: Revival Movement as a Cultural Response to Westernisation in Mizoram. Delhi: Indian Society for Promoting Christian Knowledge. ISBN 978-81-7214-901-7.
- Sailo, Ngurthankima (2011). "Vanphunga Sailo: A Peculiar Chief (1868-1922)". Historical Journal of Mizoram. XII (1).
