= Kairûma =

Eastern Lushai chief (1852–1912)

- Chief of Biate; Biate Lal
- Predecessor: Vûta
- Successor: Thangpuilali
- Born: 1852
- Died: February 22, 1912 (aged 59–60)
- Burial: Kairûma Lungphun, Biate
- Spouse: Thangpuilali
- House: Sailo
- Father: Vûta
- Mother: Neipuithangi
- Religion: Sakhua

Kairûma (1852-22 February 1912) was a Mizo chief of the eastern Lushai Hills (now Mizoram). He was the son of Vûta. He participated in the Chhak Leh Thlang Indo and the Lushai Rising where he was the last chief to resist British rule.

== Early life ==
Kairûma was born in 1852 before his father, Vûta, had moved to the settlement of Buanhmun and ignited the Chhim Leh Hmar Indo (transl. North-South War). His youth was spent being raised in the village of Rullama. During this time, he met a girl named Darkungi of the Vancheng clan, whom he wished to marry but was unable to. As a result, he instead married a Hauhnar girl known as Thangpuilali. His father Vûta died during his stay in Rullama and he remained there with his family for a further six years before migrating. Kairûma crossed the Tuichang River and settled the village of Khawlêrh.

== Chieftainship ==
=== East-West War ===
Early in his chieftainship, Kairûma experienced the East-West War between his uncles. Kairûma's father, Vûta's family sided with Mangpawrha in the west against the family of Lalsavunga and Lallianvunga. Lalsavunga's family such as Vanhnuailiana had been expanding their settlements. Vanhnuailiana's son, Liankhama was arranged to a girl but Khalkam wished to take her hand instead. This heightened tensions for the eastern Lushais who were now ready to invade the western family of Suakpuilala with justification.

Vanhnuailiana's family began to migrate closer west and this began to raise tensions over land ownership and jhum cultivation rights. The war escalated when Chief Lianphunga of the west used firearms during a dispute with an eastern chief hence beginning the war. Kairûma was observant of the skirmishes occurring and sent a war party to Hmuntha but two men were ambushed and killed and thus recalled. Chief Lalburha planned an attack on Kairûma which was relayed to him by two water fetchers of an impending war party. Kairûma fortified the entrance with a stockade, but the party ambushed from the outskirts of the settlements and massacred seven people. Kairûma vowed revenge. His brother, Chief Lungliana of Hmawngkawn, was offered a peace deal which was rejected on behalf of Kairûma's revenge. As the war dragged on, Kairûma reluctantly accepted peace.

Kairûma continued to migrate north and settled in the Sialhawk ranges, where rice production was high. Kairûma's son, Liankanglova, also grew up and inherited his own village separate from him.

=== Laltuaka conflict ===
Laltuaka's descendants, who had been subjugated by Kairûma's father, Vûta, had one descendant still in rule known as Chief Thawmpuia. Kairûma and his brother Sanglura wished to drive out Thawmpuia. Kairûma supported Sanglura's decision to attack Thawmpuia. When Sanglura sent his war party to the settlement, Thawmpuia opened the gate and entered into dialogue by encouraging them not to fight. However, Sanglura, who was confident in the party's fighting ability, ignored the warnings by Thawmpuia three times, which led to Thawmpuia and his men firing upon them and killing Sanglura. Kairûma vowed revenge for the death of his brother. Thawmpuia, aware of this, hid his men in Farpuk (transl. 'Farkawn' Cave) in Farkawn on Lurh mountain. Upon arriving with a war party, Kairûma only found old men, women and children. Kairûma and his men followed and traced the men to Farpuk, but hesitated to fight with Thawmpuia and the men. They continued to threaten them from outside the cave. After noticing a water source flowing into the cave, Kairûma planned to place poison into the stream to kill off the hidden people. However, Kairûma's upa (transl. elders) were against the idea on superstitious grounds. They killed Thawmpuia's sial and chipped off its horn as a trophy. Kairûma and his men left them alive, and Thawmpuia migrated shortly after.

After the migration, Kairûma's ally, the Fânai Chief Zaduna, occupied Thawmpuia's village of Zawlsei. Kairûma is also reputed as a tiger hunter as Zaduna requested his help in hunting down a tiger, which Kairûma killed with arrows.

== Anglo-Lushai relations ==
Following annexation via the Chin-Lushai Expedition, Chief Lalburha led the Eastern Lushai Rising against British Occupation which Kairûma participated. Even after Lalburha submitted to Robert Blair McCabe, Kairûma continued resistance. Kairûma refused to provide coolies to construct the Aizawl road and refused to meet with the political officer. In December 1895, a joint expedition from Falam (Chin Hills), Aizawl and Lunglei occupied Kairûma's village and destroyed the grains and livestock. Kairûma was a fugitive of the British but was permitted to rebuild his village after paying a fine of 60 guns. Kairûma agreed and promised to meet the Political Officer on his second tour, and thus ended the Lushai Rising as the last resisting chief.

== Later life ==
Kairûma was captured as a fugitive and brought to Aizawl in the spring of 1900 to be sentenced for six months. He served alongside Chief Zakapa. Kairûma left prison to resettle in Biate which had been merged with his other villages for administrative purposes. On 12 December 1911, Sir Lancelot Hare bestowed upon Kairûma a certificate on behalf of King George V in recognition of his administration of his villages.

Kairûma had six children with three wives. His principal wife Thangpuilali bore him Liankangloiva, Laltawna and Lalthangchuanga. His second wife, Thangthluaii bore him Lalbika. Thangluti, his third wife have birth to Thangburha. His fourth wife, Hrangziki gave birth to lalbuanga. Kairûma died on 22 February 1912, sometimes argued to be March.

== Genealogy ==
Eastern Lushai Chiefs Family Tree

Lallula
Mângpawrha	Lallianvunga	Lalpuiliana	Vûta	Neipuithangi
Suakpuilala	Ngûra	Lalphunga	Thâwmvunga	Lalsavunga
Vanpuilala	Pâwibâwia	Lalruma	Chenglena	Vanhnuailiana	Laltheri
Lalhleia	Doțhiauva	Liankhama	Ropuiliani	Lalburha	Buangtheuva
Thangkâma	Vanphunga	Lalruaia	Lalthuama
Langthanglula	Sanglura	Lalvunga	Lungliana	Kairûma	Lalkhûma

== Sources ==
- Joshi, Hargovind (2005). Mizoram Past and Present. Delhi: Mittal Publications. p. 11. ISBN 81-7099-997-9.
- Sangkima (2004). Essays on the History of the Mizos. Guwahati: Spectrum Publications. ISBN 81-87502-77-0.
- Zokima (1993). Mizo Lal Ber Kairuma Sailo [Mizo King Kairuma Sailo] (in Mizo). Aizawl: V.L.B. Press.
