= Mizo Revival of 1906 =

1906 Christian revival in Mizoram

The Mizo Revival 0f 1906 was a Christian revival movement by the Calvinistic Methodist Mission (now Presbyterian Church of Wales) in 1906 among the Mizo people. It was facilitated following the success of the Welsh Revival and the impact it had on the Khasi Revival in 1905. It was brought to Mizoram, where it caused persecution of Christians, particularly under Chief Vanphunga.

The movement's persecution facilitated the spread of Christianity and led to the cultural movement of Puma Zai in opposition to growing Christian influence.

== Revival ==
The Christian Revivalism movement occurred in Wales (1904–1905 Welsh revival) and the Khasi Hills in 1905. In February 1905, two ministers from Wales visited the Khasis and attended the assembly, which led to the possibility of the revival being brought to them. David Evan Jones followed the news of the revival in Wales. The early Mizo convert Thanga, met with James Herbert Lorrain and Frederick William Savidge to hold prayer meetings to bring the revival to the Lushai Hills among the Mizos. The prayer meetings continued from up til 1906. In March 1906, Jones and Lorraine sent a delegation to the Khasi Hills assembly, which had been hosted by a prominent Khasi Christian chief, Kinesingh, with free water and food for the assembly for three days. Edward Rowlands advocated for the early Mizo female Christians, Pawngi and Thamkumi to go with Khuma under the leadership of Siniboni, a Khasi Christian. Jones advocated for Thanga and Vanchhunga to attend on the basis that they had been successful in evangelistic tours before. Thanga became sick with an ailment but continued to strive to attend, which inspired Chawnga, a teacher in the Aizawl school. The delegates were Chawnga, Khuma, Thanga, Pawngi, Thangkungi, Vanchhunga and Siniboni from Northern Mizoram and Thangkunga, Parima and Zathanga from Southern Mizoram.

The delegation stayed at a mission station in Sylhet, where they observed hymns sung with waving hands and shaking with passion. The revivalists, during their journey, joined them and abandoned them when witnessing a man shaking with hymns. The delegation finally reached Mairang. During the prayer sessions at Mairang, the Mizos delegation began to become infected with the spirit of revivalism, with Khuma weeping and Vanchhunga stricken with burning passion. On Sunday, an 8000-person congregation was held for the Mizo delegation to bless them, which further revealed. After the end of the assembly, the Mizos left for Cherra and visited Shillong along the way. The delegation arrived back at Kukipunji in the Lushai Hills and preached the gospel.

At Aizawl, the former delegates attempted to spark the revival in the school chapel buildings without success. Many Mizos felt they were copying the Khasis blindly and sneered at the efforts. However, on Sunday before the southern delegates were to leave for Serkawn, they held a prayer and stated the farewell hymn "God be with you till we meet again". The hymn continued to be repeated with more individuals joining them. The school children also joined them upon arriving for classes. The meeting lasted hours with prayers made for others and hymns starting anew in choirs. One woman, Hlunziki, stood up and confessed her sins and asked for prayers on her behalf. All individuals, including the children, began to approach the front and confess their sins. People from the two closest villages arrived, and it continued until they were forced to continue to disassemble for dinner.

The meetings continued in this sense for hours and hours and converted many non-Christian Mizos. The most famous conversion during the revival was Chief Vankhuma of Kolasib, who entered meetings and confessed his sins and made the decision to be a follower of Jesus.

The revival increased the Mizo Christian population by 86, with many who became backsliders. The stirring lasted for two weeks at its peak before reducing its intensity as it spread to more and more villages. The first villages affected were Khandaih (Phullen), Muthi, Ngopa, Maite, Sakawrtuichhun, Saihum, Bunghmun, Pawlrang and Zokhawsang. Khandaih was the first village to experience the revival stirrings on 13 April 1906, after a boy from Aizawl returned and detailed the events taking place. Hranga, the teacher at Aizawl, attempted to travel to Khandaih to pass the revival, but reached it, seeing it was already in full effect.

== Persecution ==
Khandaih was under the rule of Chief Vanphunga. Seeing the increase in Christian converts in his village, he sensed instability to his chieftainship and considered the revival a threat. The chiefs had been losing their rights and privileges under the British, with only community loyalty to the institution of zawlbûks. However, Christianity led to the decline of the institutions, and this further weakened the hold of chiefs over their subjects. Vanphunga and his upas were of the opinion that Christians would make the privilege of zû and traditional feasts to become obsolete with their new values.

Vanphunga held the parents responsible and urged them to not indulge their children in the new faith. The chief and upas began to disperse Christian meetings with caning. Thanga and Phawka, hearing the news, came to Khandaih and preached that the faith would not be persecuted with examples of Roman persecution. However, this further proved the subjects were switching from traditional Mizo chiefs towards a new authority with Christian figures and missionaries. Vanphunga called his brothers Thangkama, Lalzika, Khawzadala, Dorawta, Thawngliana and Lalruaia to coordinate in repressing the effect of the revival.

Jones visited Vanphunga's new settlement, Changzawl, with Thanga, Vanchhunga and Vanphunga's brother-in-law, Lalsailova. Jones and his team found the chiefs drunk, with Vanphunga's sister snatched and hidden from her husband, Saithuama. Jones' attempt to see to Vanphunga's ailing sister led to an unfriendly altercation with the chiefs. Jones was punched and insulted. At midnight, Jones at the zawlbûk attempted to baptise Christians while the chiefs threw hot amber and ashes from the central hearth and chased them. Jones however managed to baptise 30 individuals by Sunday without interference. Jones made a further even to preach at Thangkama's village of Lungpher but Thangkama threatened to fine all villagers a pig if they listened to him preach. Jones threatened Thangkama with reporting his unlawful action in which he rescinded the fines.

Vanphunga however intensified his persecution with Jones actions. When Rowlands made a visit to the village, he was harassed and treated like a bawi. Vanphunga used his family connections to persecute the Christians. Lalsawma argues that this set a precedent for future persecting chiefs on a doctrine to follow. Peter Fraser (missionary) stated that young converts who were caught carrying out confessions were brought to their chiefs and forced to have zû poured down their mouth and beaten. Jones himself was nearly forced to consume zû as well.

The methods of persecution used various. Chiefs would try to force Christians to work on their sabbath day, produce zû, disperse Christian gatherings, dispossess the property of Christians, and grant bad jhumming plots. More hostile actions included falsified fines, exortion of provisions, beating, forced consumption of zû, pouring of cold water on winter nights and exposing women nude in public. Vanphunga expelled Christians from his village, but on order of the government, he was forced to accept them once more. He persecuted them again on their return, while many chose to leave, even as the Church urged perseverance. Superintendent H.W.G. Cole responded to the revival movements controversies by focussing on economic development with secular education and investing in dairy farming and agriculture.

Many of the Christians who dispersed to villages spread Christianity as individual agents of the revival in Chanphai, Durtlang and Zemabawk. The spread of Christianity to Bunghmun led Chief Hrangvunga to release his bawis, citing that he did it to please Jesus. The revival maintained its momentum in 1908 and spread east of Khandaih to Pawlrang. The revival experienced stirrings in similar strength to Aizawl in 1906 but was overshadowed by the counter-culture efforts of the promotion of Puma Zai. One chief, Rohrenga, ceded land in his village of Zokhawsang to all persecuted Christian Mizos to settle, and it became known as Pathian Veng (transl. God's village).

Revival movements continued in different localities of varying intensity until the Mizo revival of 1913.

== Puma Zai movement ==
The Puma Zai movement was coined in opposition to the revival as a cultural movement centred around a folksong known as Puma Zai which flared out in popularity in 1907. Puma was the appellation at the end of every first line in the couplet,s hence coining the name. The song became popularised in Vanphunga's neighbouring village of Ratu. With persecution being contested with government intervention, Lalzika went to Ratu with a youth from his village, Liangkhaia, and learnt the song to take back to his village. The song was popularised by the poet Thankunga, who wrote in praise of the chief and village. The chiefs threw feasts for the whole village and mimicked the revival with similar fervour and dances as the Christians had.

The song became rapidly popularised among the villages, and many chiefs and upas began to donate animals for feasts and dances. The movement was popularised among non-Mizos with even Superintendent H.W.G. Cole rewarding chiefs for greeting his visits with a Puma Zai. Puma Zai itself underwent several changes as more lines were added and the dance became known as Tlangnam Zai (transl. Community Dance).

The Church saw the cultural movement of Puma Zai as a setback to Christianity. Lorraine termed it as "Satanic opposition", which was stirring up against them. Reverend Liangkhai,a who introduced Puma Zai with Lalzika, became Christian and termed it a "Great Power of Darkness".

Puma Zai and the Christian revival movement functioned in opposition before becoming more alike over time. The Christian Revival movement began to use animal sacrifices and beating of drums borrowed from the Puma Zai festivities.

== Sources ==
- Lloyd, J. Meirion (1991). History of the Church in Mizoram: Harvest in the Hills. Synod Publication Board. pp. 17–23.
- Vanlalchhuanawma (2007). Christianity and Subaltern Cuture: Revival Movement as a Cultural Response to Westernisation in Mizoram. Delhi: Indian Society for Promoting Christian Knowledge. ISBN 978-81-7214-901-7.
