= Mizo Revival of 1913 =

1913 Christian Revival in Mizoram

The Mizo Revival of 1913 was a Christian Revivalism movement in the Lushai Hills (Mizoram) among the Mizo people. The revival independently formed two sources in the north in Aizawl and the south in Lunglei, and further spread the influence of Christianity towards more villages and areas. It introduced indigenous interpretations of Christianity and a change in women's rights and social roles.

== Background ==
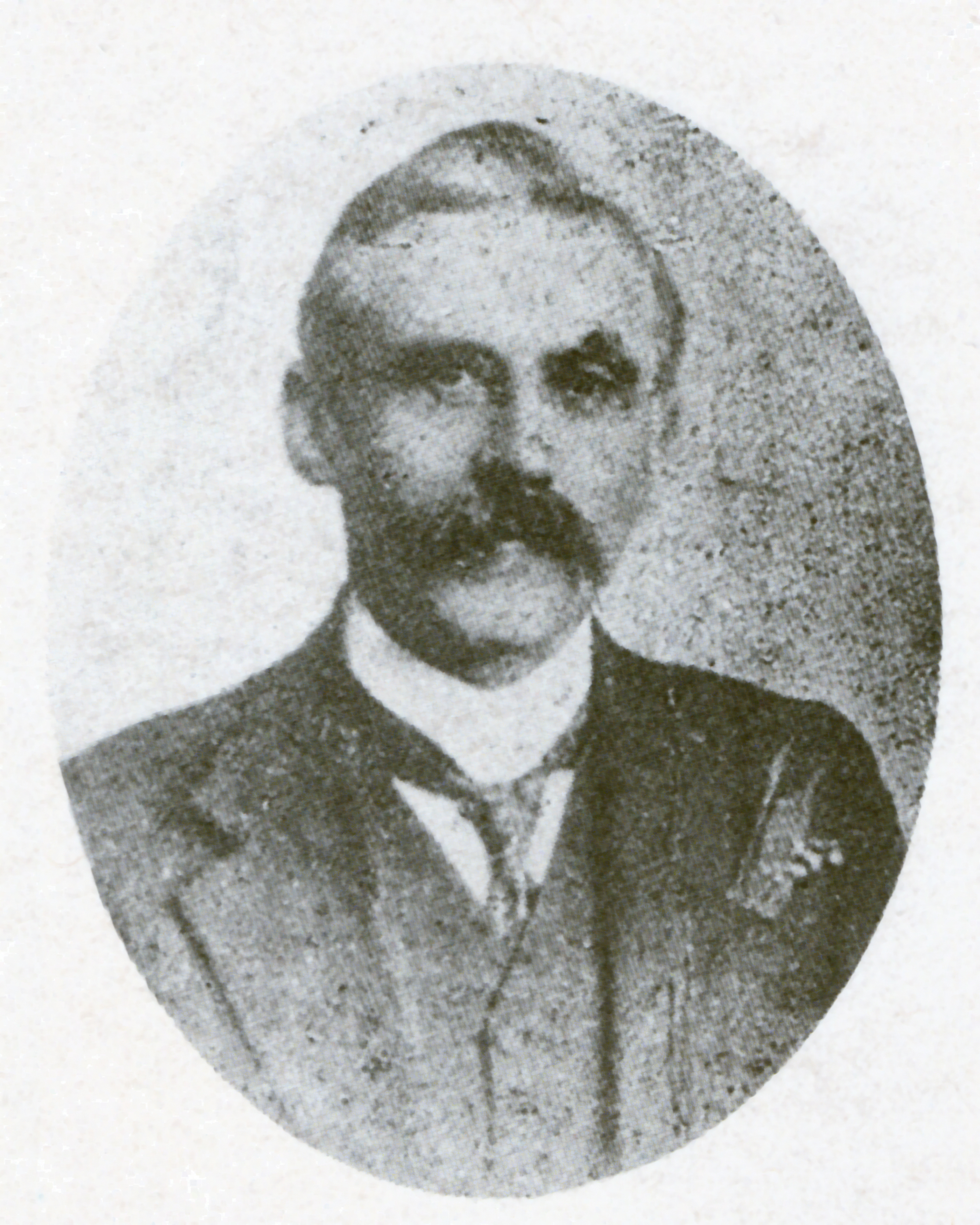
Dr. Peter Fraser, who lead the campaign against the bawi system

The Mizo revival of 1913 was contextualised with the efforts of Peter Fraser in campaigning to abolish the Bawi system, which he perceived as slavery. Fraser gained popularity as a medic and formed the Kraw Sipai (transl. Soldiers of the Cross) with freed slaves and former patients. Most missionaries adopted the view that progress in social conscience will lead to gradual abolition of the system, while Fraser had conducted his own insight and surmised it to be too hard on vulnerable individuals to be ignored.

The controversy ended with Superintendent H.W.G. Cole banishing Fraser from the Lushai Hills. Cole himself was removed from office despite his success in modernising the Lushai Hills.

In 1911-12, the mautam famine emerged in the Lushai Hills. The famine led to wide impoverishment and led to the decline of the Puma Zai-Tlangnam Zai cultural movement against the Mizo Revival of 1906. During this era, Christian Mizos and the Missions in the North and South participated in alleviating the strain of food insecurity in the Lushai Hills and those in poverty. The Lushai Famine Fund opened by the missions looked after orphans and poor people and thus made an impression on several individuals of the gospel's teachings.

== Revival ==
After the death of the Mizo Revival enthuist Dara on 3 February 1913, Dara's wife, Thangrochhingi, prayed over her husband's corpse for five days. On 9 February 1913, the revival sparked in Thangrochhingi's house with songs led by evangelist Thanghrima. The meeting intensified with passionate prayers and intense fervor for a whole week before waning after Thangrochhingi was accused to having the spirit of the devil.

The revival was brought back on 9 March 1913 at Bupawla Veng during an informal congregation of churches. The delegates held a mass prayer and sparked a revival. The leader forbade the reading of the Bible and encouraged to encounter the Holy Ghost within themselves. The revival stirred for a week with singing, dance, hymns and divine visions. The revival was most powerful in Sanga Veng where Thangrochhingi had previously experienced the first stirring.

The presbytery meetings in April and October were dominated with passionate stirrings of faith . It mostly consisted of singing, dancing, hymns and confessions of sins. The revival spread to many more villages in the north such as Sialsuk, Hmuifang, Maubang, Phulpui, Khawbung, Hualtu, Thanlailung, Darchhun, Tuisenhnar, Arro, Kawlkulh, Biate, Leisen, Khuangleng Khuangthing, Khuafoh, Hrangkima Khua, Khawdunsei, Dulte, Khawthlir and Haklawn. Western Mizoram was affected little by the stirring of the second revival due to lack of communication and difficult transportation. The two big stirrings in the west occurred in CHief Hrangvunga's village of Bunghmun who was an early Christian chief and Chieftess Lalthangthuami (Lianphunga's daughter) who professed her regret of promoting "Satan's cause".

The northeastern Mizoram stirrings were so powerful in spreading that they spilt over into Manipur at Senvawn. In the south, Chief Suaka of Durtlang worked to bring the revival south. The southern church was still influenced by an independent revival that occurred between 20-25 March 1913 at Serkawn. It began with a gathering after two years of the mautam famine had disrupted congregation. Due to heavy downpour only 630 delegates attended of the 1000 invited. Several sermons were preached by Challiana, Laia and Haudala. After the end of the sermons, the whole night was spent in singing, dancing and hymns and enthusiasm grew from the theology topics covered concerning the Resurrection of Christ.

The Revival of 1913, grew the church and continued into 1914 briefly.

== Autonomous Religious Movement ==
The second revival oversaw the indigenous interpretations of the Christian scripture emerge. One female leader of the Christian women named Nui cut her hair and advocated false teachings of worshipping the Cross instead of Jesus Christ. She influenced women to dance with cardboard cutouts of crosses in chapels. Nui also began to introduce prophecy, such as the coming of Christ, to be dated to 1918 in a speech in April 1913. However, she was stopped by an individual who stated that no one knows the return of Christ. She have away her life savings to the poor to fulfil the prophecy before she shortly died. The teachings of Nui were corrupted into end-time prophecies where individuals would dispose of all extra clothes, stop working on cultivating food in their jhums and destroy their agricultural tools for song and dance instead.

Khawtiantlira is known as the founder of the Tlira Pawl (transl. Tlira's group). Tlira had become convinced of the Second Coming of Christ and made an evangelistic trip across Burma before becoming frustrated. He encountered several divine visions where he penned 27 booklets of 712 chapters known as Sakawlh Manna Van Thar Bu (transl. Book of New Heaven and on the capture of the Chief Beast). Tlira began to teach on his visions and deviated from the teachings of the Church. Tlira's teachings were stated to resemble first century Gnosticism. Tlira attracted several prominent early Mizo Church figures and his following increased rapidly. Tlira's book has been debated by authors if it was designed to substitute the New Testament or be interpretted complimentary to it.

The Church was forced to write bulletins on the Revival and declare the true and falsified teachings of autonomous agents such as Tlira. Tlira's influence was considered a significant issue that it was raised during the 1914 october Presbytery meeting. The meeting declared the issue of false prophets and how they devalidate the scripture and mislead new converts of the faith. Tlira and his followers were excommunciated from the Church as a result. Tlira's movement lost steam as a result and the movement died with Tlira in 1951.

== Women's rights ==
The influence of the 1913 Revival shed light on the issues of women's rights in traditional Mizo society. While the Christian movement did emancipate and liberate women, it antagonised Mizo men. The arrival of the Revival allowed for the progress of women to be introduced more smoothly. Christianity introduced the abolition of bride price, marriage equality and the right of inheritance to surviving spouses. Lorraine himself believed that non-Christian Mizos treated marriage as a loose union that would be broken for trivial reasons and that Christian Mizos embodied the spirit of marriage.

The matter of the Indian Christian Marriage Act was difficult to enforce in Mizoram as it was part of the Inner Line and not subject to mainland law. The Church set up a committee from the Presbytery to oversee divorce without the interference of legal sanctions. It was designed to morally and spiritually support Christian couples without legal advice or consequences. Two years after the beginning of the revival, the Church introduced Bible women in 1916. The Church in the North officially recognised women's leadership roles in the Church. The first five Bible women were Bualthluaii, Thangluaii, Chhingtei (Aizawl), Chhingtei (Durtlang) and Dochhungi. Bualthluaii and Thangluaii were two of the early Bible women who joined the Tlira movement. The Bible Women were trained by Mrs Jones. Chhingteii of Durtlang gained the most reputation among the Bible women and set the example for the organisation later on.

== Sources ==
- Lloyd, J. Meirion (1991). History of the Church in Mizoram: Harvest in the Hills. Synod Publication Board. pp. 17–23.
- Vanlalchhuanawma (2007). Christianity and Subaltern Cuture: Revival Movement as a Cultural Response to Westernisation in Mizoram. Delhi: Indian Society for Promoting Christian Knowledge. ISBN 978-81-7214-901-7.
