= Robert Blair McCabe =

Indian Civil Service officer (1854-1897)

Robert Blair McCabe CSI

Political officer of the North Lushai Hills
- In office 9 September 1890 – 1892
- Monarch: Queen Victoria
- Preceded by: H.R. Browne
- Succeeded by: A.W. Davis

Personal details
- Born: c. 1854 Jersey, Channel Islands
- Died: June 12, 1897 (aged 42–43) Shillong, East Khasi Hills
- Cause of death: Great Shillong Earthquake
- Resting place: All Saints Cathedral Old Cemetery
- Spouse: Mabel Augusta Cortlandt Faulknor (m. 1887)
- Parent: John McCabe (father)
- Education: Victoria College, Jersey
- Occupation: Indian Civil Service
- Profession: Deputy Commissioner
- Known for: Pacification of the Naga Hills; Pacification of the Lushai Hills

Military service
- Allegiance: United Kingdom
- Branch/service: Police
- Battles/wars: Lushai Rising
- Awards: Order of the Star of India (Posthumous); The Lushai campaign medal

Robert Blair McCabe CSI (Lushai: Lalmantua, lit. 'Chief catcher', c. 1854 – 12 June 1897) was a British civil servant. He joined the Indian civil service in 1874 and was stationed in Assam in 1876. He is most well known for his pacification of the Naga Hills and the Lushai Hills, particularly the Lushai Rising. McCabe would die in 1897 after being struck by an earthquake.

== Career ==
Robert Blair McCabe originally belonged to the Assam Civil Service before becoming a member of the Indian Civil Service. McCabe's first role was assigned the Assistant Commissioner of the Naga Hills district before becoming Deputy Commissioner in 1884.

== Naga Hills ==
In July 1884, after the Ao Nagas of Manmatung cut up the bodies of Lhota traders and looted their belongings within British territory, McCabe was assigned under Lieutenant Tieman for a punitive expedition. A force of 50 military police and 40 men of the Bengal Light Infantry accompanied them. Manmatung was burnt without opposition despite significant defence, and the expedition succeeded in capturing the murderers and perpetrators.

== Lushai Hills ==
=== Western Lushai Rising ===
After the murder of H.R. Browne in the Lushai Rising, McCabe was assigned the role of Political Officer of the North Lushai Hills immediately. McCabe's reputation in handling the Ao Nagas and the Naga Hills made him the preferred choice to subdue the Lushai Rising. McCabe was assigned head of the garrison and set out from Silchar to Fort Aijal to restore order. McCabe reached Fort Aijal which had been besieged since 9 September and relieved it. On 23 November on the way to Fort Aijal McCabe had also destroyed the village of Khama. On 22 November, Khalkam, the leader of the Western Lushai chiefs in the Lushai Rising, surrendered unconditionally. McCabe fined Khalkam 20 guns to spare his jhums form being burnt down, Khalkam was also required to accompany McCabe to Fort Aijal to investigate the merit of each chief's contribution to the rising. McCabe recorded Khalkam's statement on breaking his oath with Captain Browne, the meeting of the chiefs to conspire the rising and the plan of action decided upon. In a separate report, McCabe recorded the order of influence of the Western Lushai chiefs to form a pacification policy around the most influential.

From Fort Aijal McCabe's next goal was to capture Lengpunga. From 25–29 November, McCabe ruthless pursued Lengpunga who became demoralized with Khalkam's surrender. Lengpunga made an unconditional surrender to McCabe and was placed under heavy surveillance and guards. McCabe recorded Lengpunga's statement where he admitted to acting under his brother Khalkam the paramount western Lushai chief. Lengpunga admitted to participating in the attack on Brown through his men and for firing on the reinforcement under Lieutenant Swinton during the relief force at Fort Aijal. Both Lengpunga and Khalkam were deported to Hazarbagh jail where they would commit suicide.

=== Eastern Lushai Rising ===
The eastern Lushai chiefs did not offer any help in the western Lushai rising in 1890 as their rivalry with the western lushai chiefs found it in their interest to see them weakened. The eastern Lushai chiefs however were not made to pay taxes until McCabe's announcement in 1891-1892. McCabe anticipated an eastern Lushai Rising as early as October 1891. In a report he outlined the factions of the eastern Lushai chiefs, the family of Vanhnuailiana now led by Lalburha (Lalbura) and Poiboi and the family of Vuttaia (Vuta) led by Kairuma. As Lalbura was the remaining chief of influence in the east Lushai Hills, McCabe decided to set up camp near Lalbura. The intention was to use it as a base to collect revenue from the eastern Lushai chiefs. However, McCabe hesitated at the prospect until Captain John Shakespear guaranteed him his full support. McCabe headed an expeditionary force and met with Shakespear at Kairuma's new village. A durbar of chiefs was held where a boundary dispute between Kairuma and Daokoma threatened to create a war between Vuta's family and the northern Howlong chiefs. The boundary was settled and certain villages were made over to the Assam administration as a result. The eastern Lushai chiefs cooperated with McCabe, apart from Bungteya and Lalbura. After Lalbura refused to supply coolies, McCabe headed a garrison and arrived at Lalbura's village on 28 February 1892 with Lieutenant Tytler and Captain Malville.

The garrison occupied the village with a strategic position. The Lushais, in return, burnt their houses to blockade the force into a hilly ravine. The British maintained the composure of the force and fired constant valleys to scatter the Lushai warriors. McCabe sent categorical instructions via heliograph to Captain Loch to inform the western Lushai chiefs not to shelter the eastern chiefs. The expedition against Lalbura continued from March 3 to March 17, 1892. The Lushais attacked convoys and supplies to weaken the force. British attempts for face-to-face fighting were foiled as the Lushais practiced guerilla warfare. Shakespear was mobilized to march from Fort Lungleh under order of the Bengal government. The 18th Bengal Infantry from Fort Aijal reached McCabe at Lalbura to relive them.

McCabe hounded the able bodied Lushais as he came across each village and settlement. McCabe burned down the granaries of the Lushais. The Eastern Lushais could not withstand the fight against the British and in desperation turned to ally their traditional enemies. Kairuma sent his upas to Sailenpui the western Lushai chief but he refused to share the fate of his brothers Khalkam and Lengpunga and refused to aid them. Lalbura's forces surrendered to McCabe. McCabe would then advance east of the Sonai river to capture Bungteya, Lalruya, Tankampa, Vangpunga and Poiboi's mother. The eastern Lushais agreed to supply coolies daily for the construction of the roads. As a result of McCabe's conduct and success in pacifying the Lushai Rising, the Lushais termed him Lalhmantau which refers to Chief catcher.

=== Administrative developments ===
McCabe militarised Fort Aijal further by fortifying it with more men and ammunition later on. The pacification of the Lushai Rising made merchants and representatives of the government confident into venturing into the Lushai Hills. McCabe prepared a draft for the future administration of the North Lushai Hills after studying the language and customs of the Lushai people. McCabe recommended a formal annexation which would be completed in 1895. The draft formed the basis of administration for B.c. Carey the political officer of the Chin Hills. After Carey would develop the draft further, Shakespear would finish the draft. The draft advocated for supreme authority of the superintendent of the Lushai Hills, a policy of indirect rule through Lushai chieftainship, prevalence of Lushai customary law and limited entry of English laws to severe crimes.

== Assam ==
McCabe was later assigned to Assam to restore order. McCabe on his merits was promoted to Deputy Commissioner of Kamrup district in Gauhati. The borders of kamrup bordered Bhutan which also meant that McCabe would have to deal with the Bhutias.

=== Assam peasant revolt ===
The Assam government in 1892 decreed the increase of existing rates among the population. This led to dissatisfaction among the rural individuals and peasants. Towns such as Jorhat and Gauhati held protests against the new policy. The Chief Commissioner reduced the rates, but this failed to appease the people. A no-rent campaign was initiated. The secretariat ordered McCabed to visit Rangiya which he did on 6 January 1894. Rangiya was a trouble centre, as a result McCabe initiated a meeting with delegations of the people in his camp to make a report on the no tax campaign in Kamrup district. McCabe's report would suggest redressal measures for the pacification of the infuriated peasantry. He in particular highlighted the exploitation of Assamese ryots under the Marwari traders. McCabe would also arrest some protestors. As a result, a crowd of 2000 wielding canes and sticks arrived at the Rangiya Police Station to demand release. McCabe instead decided to fire at the crowd. There were no casualties from this act, but they dispersed. However, the peasant revolt succeeded as the government failed to collect taxes from several holdings in Kamrup. McCabe advised the administration to avoid taking extreme measures. On 25 January 1894, McCabe faced a crowd of 600 protestors who turned violent, and he was dispersed by force.

Chatterjee argues that McCabe's skilful handling of the situation prevented the peasant revolt from turning violent. As opposed to McCabe's Naga and Lushai Hills administrations, McCabe utilised a persuasion policy in Kamrup. he identified the exploited nature of the peasantry as opposed to the scheming violence of the hill tribes at the time. The peasant revolt met a gory end as district magistrate Darang led the police into a confrontation leading to deaths of several on 24 January 1895.

== Death ==
Robert Blair McCabe died on 12 June 1897 during the Great Shillong Earthquake. McCabe's house structure collapsed during the disaster, leading to his death. McCabe's wife, Mabel Faulknor, was not allowed to mourn her husband's death in the immediate aftermath. A letter recounting the burial would state, 'It had been so terrible, they could not get a coffin, so he was buried only in a sheet & the grave was full of water. The men said they had never seen such a terrible funeral'.

A rhododendron species discovered in 1882 and introduced to Britain was named Rhododendron macabeanum to commemorate Robert Blair McCabe. On 29 June 1897, the London Gazette stated the Queens intention to posthumously award Robert Blair McCabe with the Compansionship of the Most Exalted Order of the Star of India for recognition of his merits among the Nagas and Lushais.

== Sources ==
- Chatterjee, Suhas (2009). Frontier Officers in Colonial Northeast India. New Delhi: Akansha Publishing. ISBN 978-81-8370-168-6.
- "The Lushai Campaign Medal awarded to Mr R.B. McCabe, Political Officer in the North Lushai Hills". Noonans Mayfair.
- "A victim of the Indian earthquake". Leicester Chronicle. Vol. 87, no. 4506. Leicester, England. 19 June 1897.
- May, Andrew J. (2023). "The Troubled House: Families, Heritance, and the Reckoning of Empire". Genealogy. 7 (1): 8. doi:10.3390/genealogy7010008.
- McCall, Anthony Gilchrist (1949). Lushai Chrysalis. London: Luzac.
- Noltie, Henry (5 July 2017). "Rhododendron macabeanum". Royal Botanic Garden Edinburgh. Edinburgh.
- Sweet, May. "Xeroxed copy of a letter to her sister Mrs. Godfrey" (28 June 1897) [Letter]. Cambridge South Asia Archives. University of Cambridge.
