= Lalburha =

Eastern Lushai chief (1843–1933)

- Chief of Champhai; Champhai Lal
- Reign: 1871–1892
- Predecessor: Vanhnuailiana
- Born: 1843
- Died: 1933 (aged 89–90)
- Issue: Chawnbika (Vancheng Lal); Rokima (Arro Lal); Lalhluta (Khawzawl Lal); Thangchungnunga (Chhawrtui Lal)
- House: Sailo
- Father: Vanhnuailiana
- Mother: Rolianpuii
- Religion: Sakhua

Lalburha (English: Lalbura (Note: variations: Lalboora, Lalburah), 1843–1933) was a Lushai chief in the Eastern Lushai Hills and ruled the settlement of Champhai. Lalburha is recognised for being the third son of Vanhnuailiana and the target of the Lushai Expedition in 1871. His anti-British diplomacy led to his participation in the Lushai Rising following British annexation of the Lushai Hills.

== Chieftainship ==
Lalburha was one of the chiefs who participated in the raids leading to the Lushai Expedition. After Bengkhuaia attacked Katlichera and Alexandrapore and captured Mary Winchester (Zoluti), several chiefs followed in a similar fashion. Lalburha attacked Monierkhal outpost on January 20 1871 and killed 7 people while suffering heavy casualties on his side. Lalburha managed to capture 13 guns from the British forces in total. His raid was followed by Thanhranga, who attacked Nugdigram.

=== Lushai Expedition ===
The British arranged a punitive expedition targeted at Lalburha as part of the overall campaign. The Cachar column, which was prepared for the Eastern Lushai chiefs, was aided by Western Lushai chiefs such as Suakpuilala and Kalkhama. Lalburha refused to cooperate with the British and instead opted for resistance against the expedition. General Bourchier of the Cachar Column prepared his forces to overwhelm Lalburha. However, Lalburha left the settlement before the column arrived. Only his father, Vanhnuailiana's tomb, remained in the settlement. Lalburha had left the village on account of his father's death and a Suktê invasion and escaped South-East of Champhai. Lalburha's mother, Rolianpuii, and her upas (transl. elders/councillors) surrendered to the column and concluded peace with the British instead.

It was recorded that the Manipur contingent withdrew due to a disease outbreak among troops. This incentivised the Suktê tribes, historical enemies of the Lushais, to descend on Lalburha's settlement amidst the panic of the expedition.

The Suktê tribes held grievances against Lalburha and his father Vanhnuailiana. At a time when the Suktê's were short of food and requested aid, both Lalburha and Vanhuailiana turned them away. The Suktês were prepared to purchase rice but still turned away empty-handed. A second attempt to purchase rice was made, and Vanhnuailiana, with Lalburha, killed one of the party members. This had led to war between the Suktes and the Eastern Lushais. The Suktês later claimed to have destroyed Tumpai, Lemkam and Tatlangkwa and overran the country around Champhai with many heads and captives. The Siyin tribes also joined in, and as a result, Lushai slaves were settled in the Chin Hills under their settlements.

Lalburha retaliated with two invasions into the Suktê territories. His first attempt to invade Saiyan failed after his party was spotted and counterattacked until it retreated. The first skirmish led to the death of seven Lushais. His second attempt was targeted at Molbem. Lalburha succeeded in crossing the Manipur River unobserved. However, Molbem's position at the top of the mountain fortified itself against the attack and forced Lalburha to retreat. Crossing the Manipur River back into Champhai saw two Lushais drown. Lalburha succeeded in defending his settlement but at a heavy cost. His stockades and defences were destroyed, and this incentivised him to burn down his village and leave it. Only his father, Vanhnuailiana's tomb, remained untouched. The upas of Rolianpuii met with the British column encamped at Vanhnuailiana's tomb and negotiated peace terms on 18th February 1872. The terms were that:

- British agents would have free access to the village.
- Three hostages would accompany the force to Tipaimukh if Lalburha could not be surrendered into their custody.
- Arms and guns taken from the raids at Moinerkhal and Nugdigram would be surrendered. If unable to, then their own weapons would compensate for the ones looted.
- A fine of two elephant tusks, a necklace, and a war gong. Along with the fine, a number of animals were demanded, consisting of four mithuns, ten goats, ten pigs, fifty fowls and twenty maunds of husked rice.

If the last two terms were unable to be completed, then the column would attack the settlement of Rolianpuii in Chawnchhim on the 20th of February. The column moved to Rolianpuii's village of Chawchhin. Difficulties were proclaimed in collecting the muskets but the quota was fulfilled by nighttime and three upas were chosen to accompany the column to Tipaimukh.

== Lushai Rising ==
After the annexation of the Lushai Hills with the Chin-Lushai Expedition, R.B. McCabe was appointed the first political officer of the North Lushai Hills. McCabe set up camp at Lalburha's settlement of the same name as he was the only powerful Eastern Lushai chief apart from Vuta's son, Kairuma. McCabe hoped to use Lalburha's settlement as a base to collect taxes and demand labour as coolies. McCabe hesitated at the prospect until John Shakespear of the South Lushai Hills guaranteed him help. In February 1892, McCabe ordered Lalburha to supply 100 coolies, which Lalburha refused. Most Eastern Lushai chiefs were not hostile regarding the new house tax and coolie system, apart from Bungtey and Lalbura. Lalburha attempted to make a defensive alliance with Vuta's sons but failed. McCabe departed for Lalburha's settlement on 28th February. Along the way, McCabe found Lalburha's men burning his camp at Sonai. When McCabe reached Lalburha's settlement on the 29th of February, 300 Lushais were seen advancing. McCabe ordered a volley to be fired to subdue them temporarily. However, the settlement began to burn, and McCabe and his men and coolies took shelter in a heap of baggage and belongings in the middle of the settlement amidst musket shots being fired. The Lushais under Lalburha had thought to blockade the British by trapping them inside a hilly ravine surrounded by burning buildings. Lalburha was supported by other resistant chiefs such as Pâwibâwia, Liankhama and Bungtheuva. The chiefs continued to attack McCabe's position between 1 March-10 April 1892. Furthermore, Pâwibâwia and Lalburha raided a tea estate in Cachar on 4 April in Hailakandi of Cachar. The resisting chiefs continued to raid supplies and transport, causing losses to the British garrisons in the Lushai Hills.

McCabe, as a result, brought reinforcements from the Bengali infantry who arrived on 19 March. On 14 April, Poiboi was captured. Bungteya was captured on the 7th of May and Lalburha became a fugitive with little resistance to the British remaining. Lalburha eventually submitted, and by 1896, A.Porteus commented that Lalburha had received him in his village like any other chief who had reconciled with the expedition. A fort was established on top of Lalburha village, and their arms were confiscated.

== Biography ==
Eastern Lushai Chiefs Family Tree

Lallula
Mângpawrha	Lallianvunga	Lalpuiliana	Vûta	Neipuithangi
Suakpuilala	Ngûra	Lalphunga	Thâwmvunga	Lalsavunga
Vanpuilala	Pâwibâwia	Lalruma	Chenglena	Vanhnuailiana	Laltheri
Lalhleia	Doțhiauva	Liankhama	Ropuiliani	Lalburha	Buangtheuva
Thangkâma	Vanphunga	Lalruaia	Lalthuama
Langthanglula	Sanglura	Lalvunga	Lungliana	Kairûma	Lalkhûma

=== Family ===
Lalburha was the son of Vanhnuailiana and Rolianpuii. His sister Ropuiliani was wedded to Vandula of the Howlong chiefs. Lalburha had four sons, namely Rokima of Arro, Lalhluta of Khawzawl, Thangchungnunga of Chhawrtui and Chawnbika of Vancheng.

=== Death ===
Lalburha would move from Sesawng village to Phunchawngzal and die in 1933.

== Source ==
- Carey, Bertram S; Tuck, H.N. (1896). The Chin Hillls:A History of the people, British dealings with them, their customs and Manners and a Gazetteer of their Country. Delhi: Cultural Publishing House.
- Chatterjee, Suhas (1985). British rule in Mizoram. New Delhi: Mittal Publications.
- Chatterjee, Subhas (1995). Mizo Chiefs and the Chiefdom. New Delhi: M D Publications PVT LTD. ISBN 81-85880-72-7.
- Hutchinson, R.H Sneyd (1906). An Account of the Chittagong Hill Tracts. Calcutta: Bengal Secreteriat Book Depot.
- Jackson, Kyle (2023). The Mizo Discovery of the British Raj: Empire and Religion in Northeast India, 1890-1920. Cambridge, United Kingdom: Cambridge University Press. ISBN 978-1-009-26734-2.
- Joshi, Hargovind (2005). Mizoram: Past and Present. New Delhi: Mittal Publications. ISBN 81-7099-997-9.
- Nunthara, C (1996). Mizoram: Society and Polity. New Delhi: Indus Publishing Company. p. 42. ISBN 81-7387-059-4.
- Reid, A.S. (1893). Chin-Lushai Land: Including a description of the various expeditions into the Chin-Lushai Hills and the final annexation of the country. Calcutta: Thacker, Spink and Co.
- Reid, Robert (1942). The Lushai Hills: culled from History of the frontier areas bordering on Assam from 1883-1941. Calcutta: Firma KLM. p. 49.
- Woodthorpe, R.S (1873). The Lushai Expedition: 1871-1872. London: Hurst and Blackett Publishers.
- Tribal Research Institute (1993). Objects of Mizo Antiquity (PDF). Aizawl: J & J Press.
