= Mizoram Presbyterian Church Synod =

Largest Christian Denomination in Mizoram

Coordinates: 23.7203°N 92.7222°E

- Official logo
- Classification: Protestant
- Orientation: Calvinist
- Scripture: Holy Bible
- Polity: Presbyterian
- Governance: Synod
- Moderator: Rev. John Raldosanga
- Associations: Presbyterian Church of India; North East India Christian Council; National Council of Churches in India; World Communion of Reformed Churches; Christian Conference of Asia; Council for World Mission
- Region: Mizoram
- Headquarters: Aizawl
- Founder: Foreign Missionary Society of the Calvinistic Methodist Church
- Origin: 11 January 1894; 132 years ago
- Branched from: Presbyterian Church of Wales
- Members: 6,28,719 (2023)
- Ministers: 588 (2023)
- Hospitals: Synod Hospital, Durtlang and John Williams Hospital, Lunglei
- Official website: http://www.mizoramsynod.org

Mizoram Presbyterian Church Synod (Mizoram Presbyterian Kohhran Synod in Mizo) is the largest Christian denomination in Mizoram, northeast India. It was a direct progeny of the Calvinistic Methodist Church (officially named the Presbyterian Church of Wales in 1928) in Wales. It is one of the two churches founded by the missionaries and is now one of the constituent bodies of a larger denomination Presbyterian Church of India (PCI), which has its headquarters in Shillong, Meghalaya. The administrative body called the Mizoram Synod has its headquarters at Mission Veng, Aizawl. As the first church, it remains the largest denomination in Mizoram.

In June 2012, the Mizoram Presbyterian Church revoked its official partnership with the Presbyterian Church (U.S.A.) with which it was allied since 1999. In its 239th Executive Committee meeting, Mizoram Synod decided that ordination of gay clergy and the practice of gay marriage recently endorsed by the North American church were against biblical teachings.

== Origin ==
Mizoram Presbyterian Church was established and founded by Welsh missionaries. The Welsh church had formed Foreign Missionary Society in 1840 in Liverpool to provide missionaries to India. Chosen for Mizoram, D.E Jones arrived in Aizawl on 31 August 1897. The pioneer missionaries F.W. Savidge and J. H. Lorrain, commissioned by Arthington Aborigines Mission, welcomed him and prepared him for his mission. The two missionaries had arrived in 1894 and started school, created Mizo script, and prepared grammar and dictionary. Jones stayed with them until the two departed on 31 December 1897 as Arthington Aborigines Mission handed over the mission field to Welsh Mission. On his birthday on 15 February 1898, Jones opened a school at his bungalow, which was subsequently used as a congregational meeting place for worship and Sunday schools. In August 1897, the Welsh Mission had arranged for a Khasi Christian, Rai Bahadur, and his family from Khasi Hills to help Jones; the first enlisted members of the congregation consisted of 6 Khasis in addition to Jones and his wife.

Mizoram Synod Office, Mission Veng

== Statistics (as of Synod, 2022-23) ==
Statistics (as of 2023)	Number
Presbyteries	47
Pastorates	298
Churches	1,140
Ministers	588
Ordained Elders	5,816
Families	139,974
Communicants	456,197
Male members	304,304
Female members	324,415
Total members	628,719

== Women Fellowship (Kohhran Hmeichhia) ==
Women Fellowship is a fellowship for women under Mizoram Presbyterian Church, and its members are mainly married women. According to the report of General Secretary of Kohhran Hmeichhia, in December 2009, it has 1,43,159 members from 91,423 families.

== Kristian Ṭhalai Pâwl ==
Kristian Ṭhalai Pawl (Christian Youth Fellowship) is a fellowship for young people in the church, with motto 'Saved to serve'. It has four main stated objectives.

1. To bring youths to the knowledge and likeness of Christ.
2. To shape youths in becoming faithful instruments of the Church.
3. To fulfill the work and ministry of the Church.
4. To spread the gospel of Jesus Christ.

According to the report given in the General conference held during 1–4 March 2018 the KṬP (Kristian Ṭhalai Pawl) had 147,665 members and 860 branches, and supports more than one thousand missionaries, inside and outside of Mizoram.

== Male Fellowship (Kohhran Pavalai Pawl) ==
The Kohhran Pavalai Pawl, Male Fellowship was established in 2017.

== Mission ==
Synod Mission Board is the body in charge of the missionary works of the Mizoram Presbyterian Church, within analed outside India. It looks after 17 mission fields in India (including Nepal, Home Mission North and South), and sends missionaries to Taiwan, Solomon Islands, Tuvalu, China, Nepal, United Kingdom, Samoa, Madagascar, American Samoa and Kiribati. Under Synod Mission Board, 1,758 workers are working for the Kingdom of God.

Statistics of Synod Mission Fields:

- Pastorate 94
- Number of churches 350
- Number of Branch Churches 502
- Fellowship 312
- Members 83,797
- Elders 514

Synod Mission Board established the Missionary Training Department from 1978. The Objective of this centre is to promote knowledge and understanding of the Bible, Missiology and Theology, growth in Christian discipleship and developing skill for cross cultural ministry. In 1991, a pre-service training for the 'would-be' missionaries was instituted, and has become a one-year course, which each missionary of the Church has to go through. This missionary training centre was upgraded in 2010, and it became Missionary Training College, where anyone can study Missiology.

In addition to MTC, to equip missionaries and new believers, Mizoram Synod run many programmes and institutions. Among these, Presbyterian Hindi Bible School is meant to train new believers of Indian and Nepali. Mission Development Training Centre trained missionaries and new believers in the field of agriculture, carpentry and dairy farming. Some of the members of the Church, such as Lalsawma, a Padma Shri awardee, has been honoured by the Government of India for their contributions to the society.

== Education ==
The Mizo Synod operates many schools, from primary level to secondary level. Synod Higher Secondary School, Aizawl has a strength of 58 teaching staff and 870 students. 40% of its seats are reserved for students from rural areas. Presbyterian Girls' School is of Middle School level with 32 teaching staff and non-teaching staff and 484 students. Besides, there are 73 schools, run by the Churches with financial grant from the Synod.

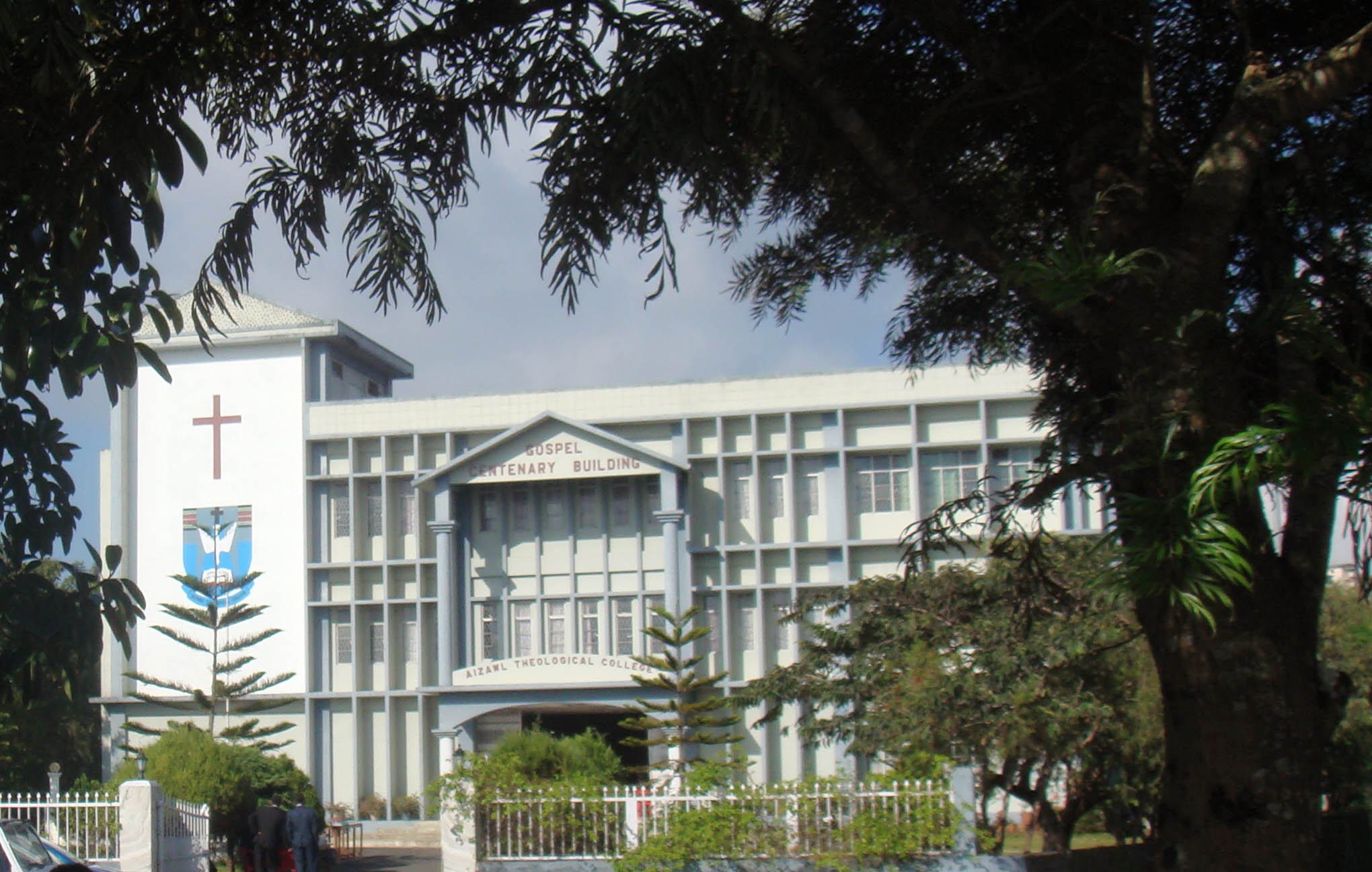
Aizawl Theological College, Durtlang

Synod Higher Secondary School, Mission Vengthlang

Aizawl Theological College is the only theological Institution with M.Th. studies in the State and is upgraded to Doctoral studies in 2013. It is affiliated to Serampore College (University) as a graduate and post graduate college. This theological college is founded by the first Presbyterian missionary in Mizoram, Rev. D. E. Jones in 1907, then refounded by J. Meirion Lloyd. The Master of Theology (M. Th) programme in Christian Theology had been introduced since 2002 and M. Th. (New Testament and Missiology) respectively are also being introduced from 2007 academic session. The college plans to add M. Th. studies in other disciplines in the years ahead. The college has already become a local centre for Bachelor of Christian Studies (B.C.S), Diploma in Christian Studies (Dip. C.S.), and Doctor of Ministry (D. Min) programmes of the Senate of Serampore College.

School and Colleges under Presbyterian Church of India, Mizoram Synod:

- Colleges 2
- High schools 24
- Middle schools 113
- Primary schools 179
- Teachers/lecturers 1,853
- Students 34,924

== Mizo Sunday School Union ==
The Sunday School Ministry of the Mizoram Presbyterian Church is a ministry that puts the Mizoram Church at a very important and outstanding place from all others Churches in India. There are 44,060 Sunday school teachers and 3,83,888 learners (students).

== Healing Ministry ==
One of the most important in Christian ministries is Healing Ministry. Every mission and church undertaking healing ministry through miracle and medical sciences. Mizoram Presbyterian Church's also taking step in the field of healing ministry. Durtlang Hospital operated by Synod is one of the pioneer medical centres in Mizoram, founded by Welsh missionaries. Besides, it has dispensaries and health centres in rural areas, and clinics inside Aizawl City.

- Hospital : 2 Nos.
- Dispensary & Health Centre: 64 Nos.
- Doctors, 32 Nos.
- Nurses, 246 Nos.

== Association/Affiliation ==
- National Council of Churches in India (NCCI), Member
- World Alliance of Reformed Churches, Member.
- Maraland Presbyterian Church is an affiliated church under Mizoram Presbyterian Church.

== See also ==
- Christianity in Mizoram
- North East India Christian Council
- Council of Baptist Churches in Northeast India
- List of Christian denominations in North East India
