= Lalsawma =

Indian social worker and writer

The Reverend Lalsawma
- Portrait
- Born: 1930; Sailam, Mizoram, India
- Died: 9 February 2017 (aged 86–87); Aizawl Hospital, Aizawl, Mizoram, India
- Occupations: Pastor (Mizoram Presbyterian Church Synod); Social worker Writer
- Known for: Pastor, Social Work, Writing, Teaching and Preaching.
- Spouse: Pi Lalnuntluangi
- Children: James Lalsiamliana, Saroj Laldinpuii, Johan Lalhuma (L), Caryll Lalpari, Gilbert Lalzarliana(L), Daniel Lalzova
- Parent(s): Rev Langlura(L), Pi Darneihkimi(L)
- Awards: Padma Shri; Hon. D.Div. (Serampore University)

Lalsawma was an Indian social worker, writer and a Christian missionary and Pastor of the Mizoram Presbyterian Church. He is most known for his contributions in the reconciliation efforts between the Government of India and the Mizo National Front (MNF) on two occasions.

== Early life ==
Lalsawma was born on 28 June 1930 at Sailam to Reverend Langlura and Darneihkungi. Lalsawma was raised Christian as his father was a pastor and his elder brother, Reverend Zokima, served as a pastor at the Wesleyan Methodist Church in Burma. He married Lalnuntluangi in Mission Veng Church on 7 March 1961.

== Education ==
Lalsawma completed lower primary in 1942 and Middle Anglo Vernacular School from Sialhawk in 1947. He completed his matriculation in 1952. He attended Cherra Theological College and graduated in 1955 after pursuing Licentiate in Theology. In 1958, Lalsawma graduated from Serampore College with a Masters of Divinity degree which made him the first Master in Theology holder in Mizoram. In 2002, Lalsawma was granted an honorary degree by the Senate of Semapore of Doctor of Divinity.

== Career ==
Rev. Lalsawma in Thingsulthliah (c.2004)

In 1955, Lalsawma was appointed by the Presbyterian Assembly as a probationary pastor at Durtlang pastorate. After his studies he was appointed as probationary pastor at Biate pastorate. He was ordained at the Special Synod held at Mission Veng on 28 June 1958. He served the Biate pastorate until May 1961. From 1964 to 1978 Lalsawma held a position as Registrar and Acting Principal in Aizawl Theological College. During 1966-1967 Lalsawma was a Synod Secretary followed by a post of moderator in 1968 and 1987. Lalsawma was also moderator and secretary of the Presbyterian Church of India Assembly in two terms of 1965-1968 and 1972–1974. As pastor, Lalsawma served in Durtlang, Biate and Mission Veng. Lalsawma also wrote several books in English and Mizo.

== MNF peace talks ==
In the wake of the March 1966 Mizo National Front uprising, the Mizoram Presbyterian Church Synod appointed missionaries for peace talks with MNF in 1969 and Lalsawma was one of two missionaries who contacted the MNF leaders. In 1982, he was again a member of the three-men delegation who held talks with MNF which, untimaltely, led to the Mizo Accord of 1986. He has written several articles and is the author of the book, Four Decades of Revivals, the Mizo Way. The Government of India awarded him the fourth highest civilian honour of the Padma Shri, in 2005, for his contributions to Indian society.

== Death ==
Lalsawma died on 9 February 2017 at Mission Vengthlang in Aizawl.

== See also ==
- Mizoram Presbyterian Church Synod
- Mizo National Front
- March 1966 Mizo National Front uprising
- Mizo Accord

== Sources ==
- Ralte, Vanlalnghaka (March 2017). "Reverend Dr Lalsawma" (PDF). Presbyterian Review. XXVII (81): 30–31.
