= J. Meirion Lloyd =

The Reverend John Meirion Lloyd
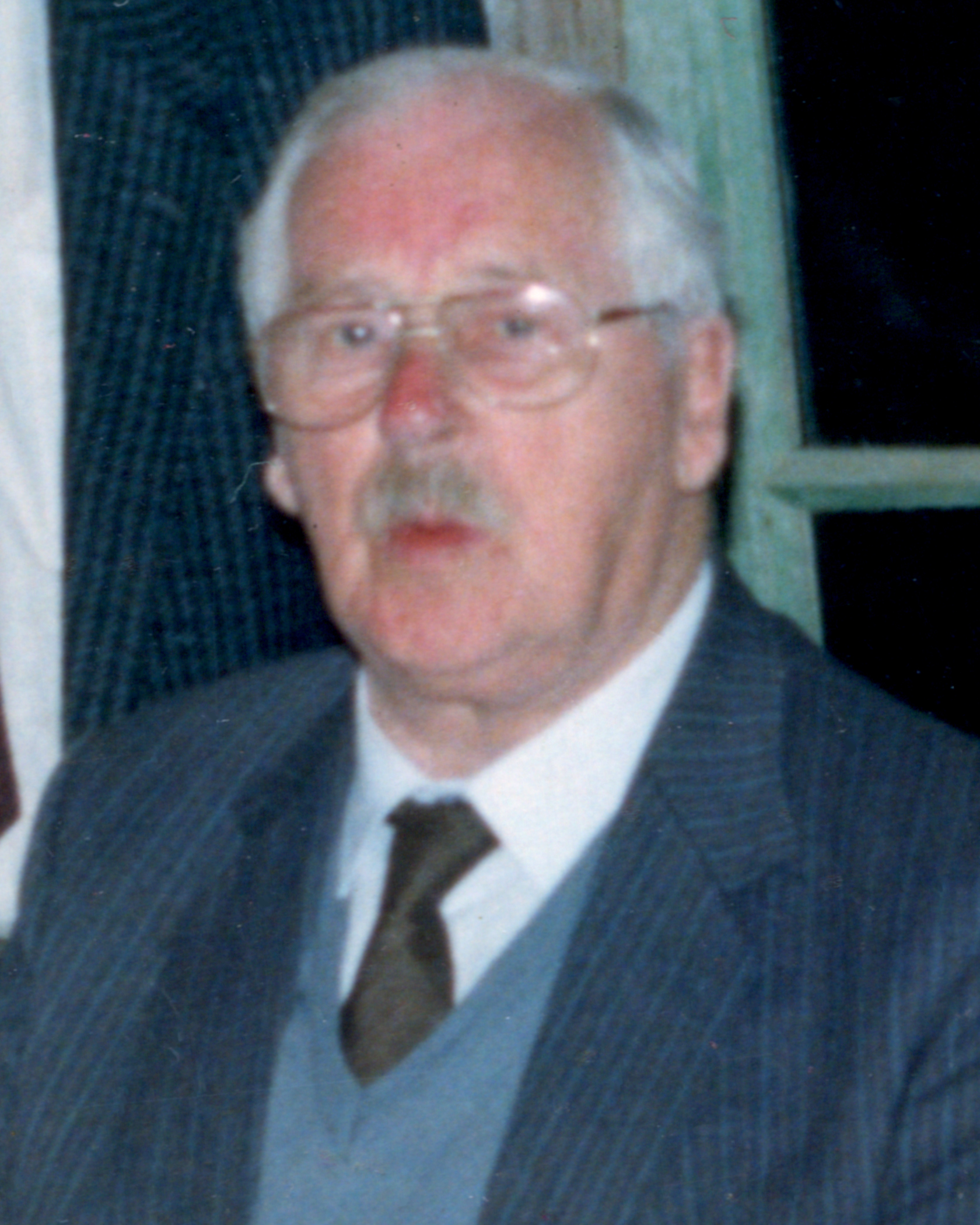
- Lloyd, c. 1990s
- Born: 4 May 1913; Corris, Merionethshire, Wales
- Died: 30 September 1998 (aged 85); Prestatyn, Wales
- Citizenship: Wales
- Education: University of Wales (M.Th); Aberystwyth University; Cardiff University; Trefeca College; Selly Oak Colleges
- Occupations: Missionary, Pastor, Author, Translator, Bible Translator
- Spouse: Joan Lloyd (née Maclese) (1923-2017) (m. 1944))
- Children: 3
- Religion: Christianity
- Church: Presbyterian
- Ordained: 1941

John Meirion Lloyd (Corris, Merionethshire 4 May 1913 - Prestatyn, 30 September 1998) was a Welsh Presbyterian missionary in Mizoram, India. He was ordained a minister of the Presbyterian Church of Wales 1941, and followed in the tradition of his countryman in Mizoram David Evan Jones (missionary). He was head of the team responsible for the Bible translation into the Mizo language in 1955.

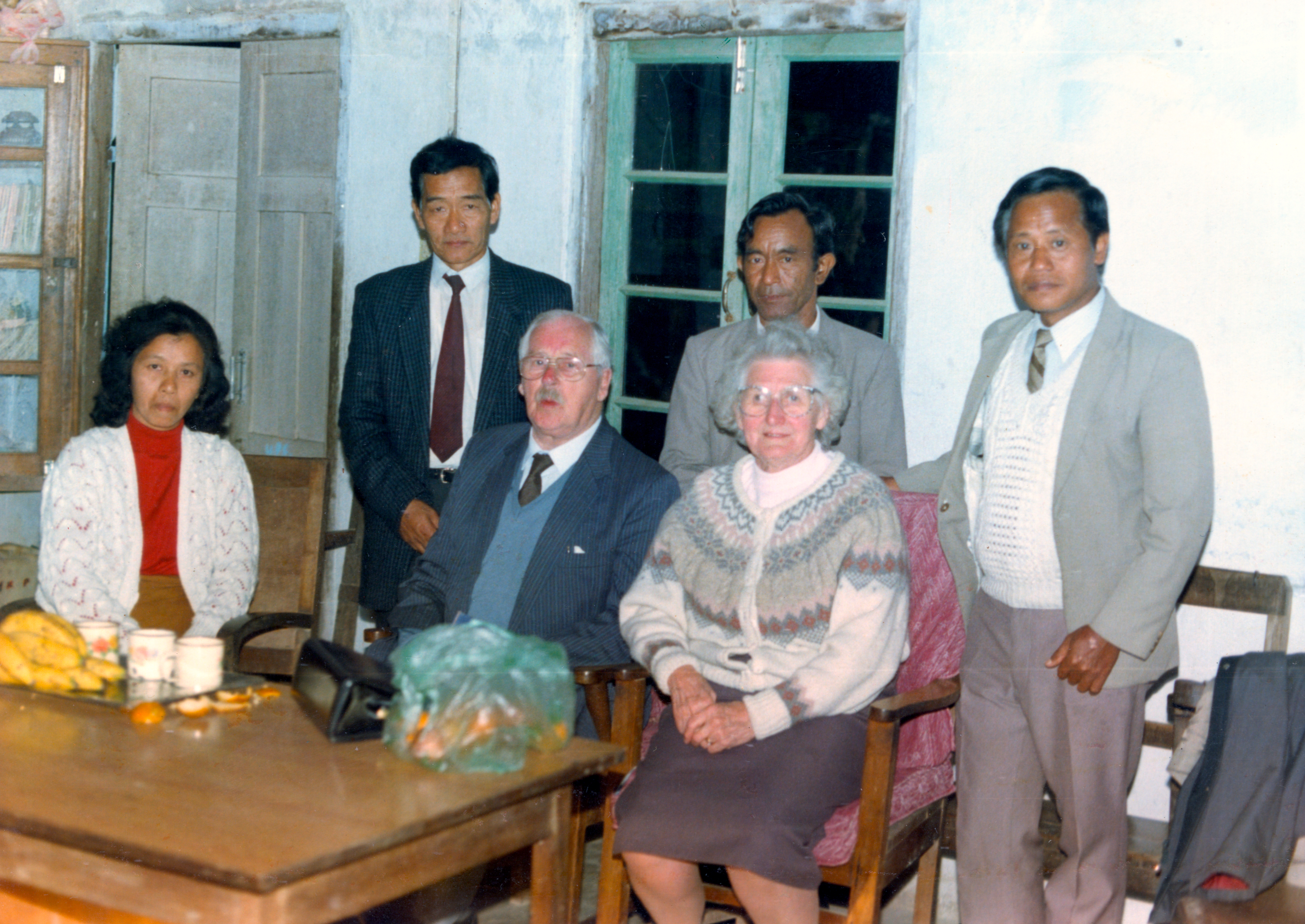
Rev J. M. Lloyd and Mrs. Joan Lloyd with Mizos in Hlimen Damveng (c.1994)

== Publications ==
- Y Bannau Pell (1989) - a history of the Mizoram Presbyterian Church in Welsh, with English and Mizo translations
