= Synod Hospital, Durtlang =

- Mizoram Presbyterian Church Synod
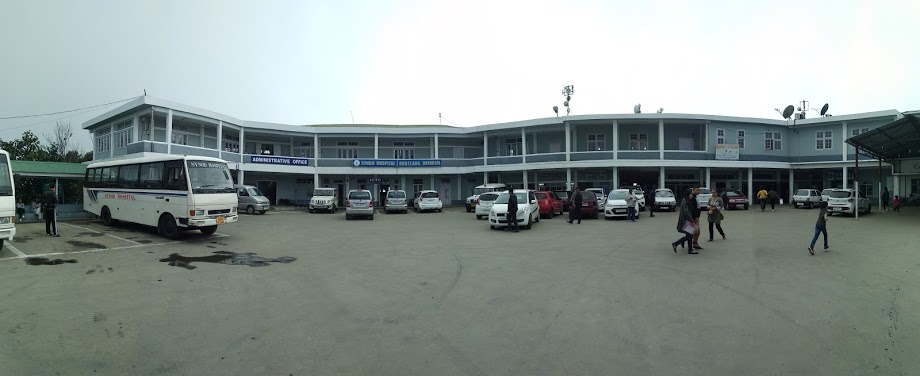
- Synod Hospital

Geography
- Location: Durtlang, Aizawl, Mizoram, India
- Coordinates: 23.772121°N 92.730999°E

Organisation
- Funding: Not-for-profit
- Type: General
- Religious affiliation: Christianity

Services
- Emergency department: Yes
- Beds: 355

History
- Opened: 1928; 98 years ago

Links
- Website: www.synodhospital.org
- Lists: Hospitals in India

Synod Hospital, Durtlang (formerly known as Presbyterian Hospital, Durtlang) is a general hospital and nursing school in Aizawl, Mizoram, India. The hospital is widely known among Mizo people as "Durtlang Hospital". It is managed and governed by the Mizoram Presbyterian Church Synod. The hospital was established in 1928 by the Calvinistic Methodist Church (now the Presbyterian Church of Wales) as a nursing institute. It is the second hospital (after Christian Hospital Serkawn) established, and the largest non-governmental hospital in Mizoram. It has a registered capacity of 355 beds.

== History ==
In 1923, Suaka, Chief of Durtlang, leased the hill top of Durtlang known as Derhken Tlang (derhken for marigold, tlang, hill) for theological school of the Welsh Christian Mission. A small building was constructed and run by Fred J. Sandy, a Welsh missionary. With the establishment of formal education in the main Aizawl area, the theological school was also sifted to Mission Veng, Aizawl in 1926. (By then Sandy had died of influenza.) The property was abandoned.

Dr. John Williams, L.M.P., a Welsh missionary from Cwm-y-glo, Caernarfonshire, arrived on 22 February 1928 to become the second medical doctor after Dr. Peter Fraser who arrived on 9 December 1908 but left after 4 years stay. He wisely chose Durtlang for his mission field. With the help of only two supporting staff D. Thianga, a compounder (pharmacist), and Tlawmkungi, a midwife, he converted the old theological school building into a hospital. Williams noted later:

With regard to the site – I went with the Chief to look for a place – the best place I saw was behind this house – a tank must be built – the spring is about ½ a mile away.

With the admission of the first patient on 6 March 1928 the hospital was formally inaugurated and was named as the "Welsh Mission Hospital". A 16-year-old girl Khuangi became the first nursing student later that year. The Welsh mission sent Winifred Margaret from Maesglas Farm, near Tregaron, to become the first trained nurse, and arrived on 7 January 1927. On 1 February 1924 the Welsh Mission Hospital recruited its first Mizo doctor H.K. Thanglura. In July of the same year Dr R.K. Nghakliana, who had just completed MBBS, joined him. The nursing course was approved by the Indian Nursing Council in the year 1944, becoming the first recognised nursing school in northeast India. The political climate in the country began to forebode uncertainty for the missionaries. With the independence of India, Welsh mission works came to a halt. The Welsh mission handed over the ownership and management of the entire to the Mizoram Presbyterian Church Synod on 28 February 1958, and the name officially became "Presbyterian Hospital". On 1 January 2012 the hospital was renamed “Synod Hospital” for the final time. It is situated at the highest point in aizawl with an elevation of 1384 metres.

== Facility ==
The hospital is now equipped with well furnished major operation theatre, gynaecological O.T., and eye O.T., medical, surgical, pediatrics, orthopedics, eye, ENT and obstetrics and gynaecology wards and two complexes of private wards with deluxe rooms in the new cabin complex. The hospital also has acquired modern equipment’s like X-ray machine, USG machine, ECG machine, CT scan, fetal monitor and endoscopy equipments. Departments such as medicine, surgery, gynaecology, pediatrics, ENT, eye and orthopedics have specialist doctors.

=== Extension ===
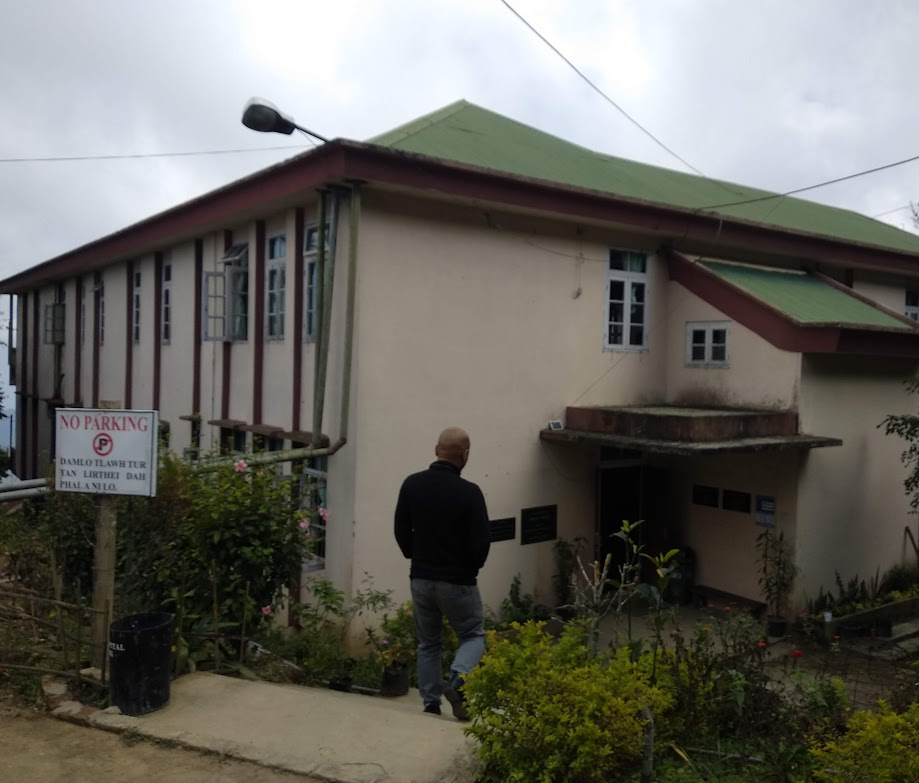
Grace Home, Durtlang Hospital

The hospital has extension centres in the proper Aizawl city such as Dr. Fraser’s Clinic for out-door patients, Grace Inn which is a drop-in centre for persons with substances abuse problems, and out-door patient clinic at Millennium Centre. It also has adjoining special care centres such as Grace Ward for drug abuse victims, and Grace Home for AIDS patients.

== College of Nursing ==
Dr John Williams started the first school of Nursing in Durtlang 22 February 1928. Dr G P Roberts and Sister GM Evans upgraded the school to a 4-year course in 1936 with an annual intake of 12 students. Recognition was obtained from the Indian Nursing Council in 1944. The school has been upgraded to a College of Nursing recently with a Bsc Nursing degree programme since 2019. The BSc course has an annual intake of 30 students.

== Important birth ==
- Lal Thanhawla, Chief Minister of Mizoram, was born on 19 May 1942.
