= Aizawl Theological College =

Presbyterian seminary in Mizoram, India

Coordinates: 23.7616°N 92.7350°E

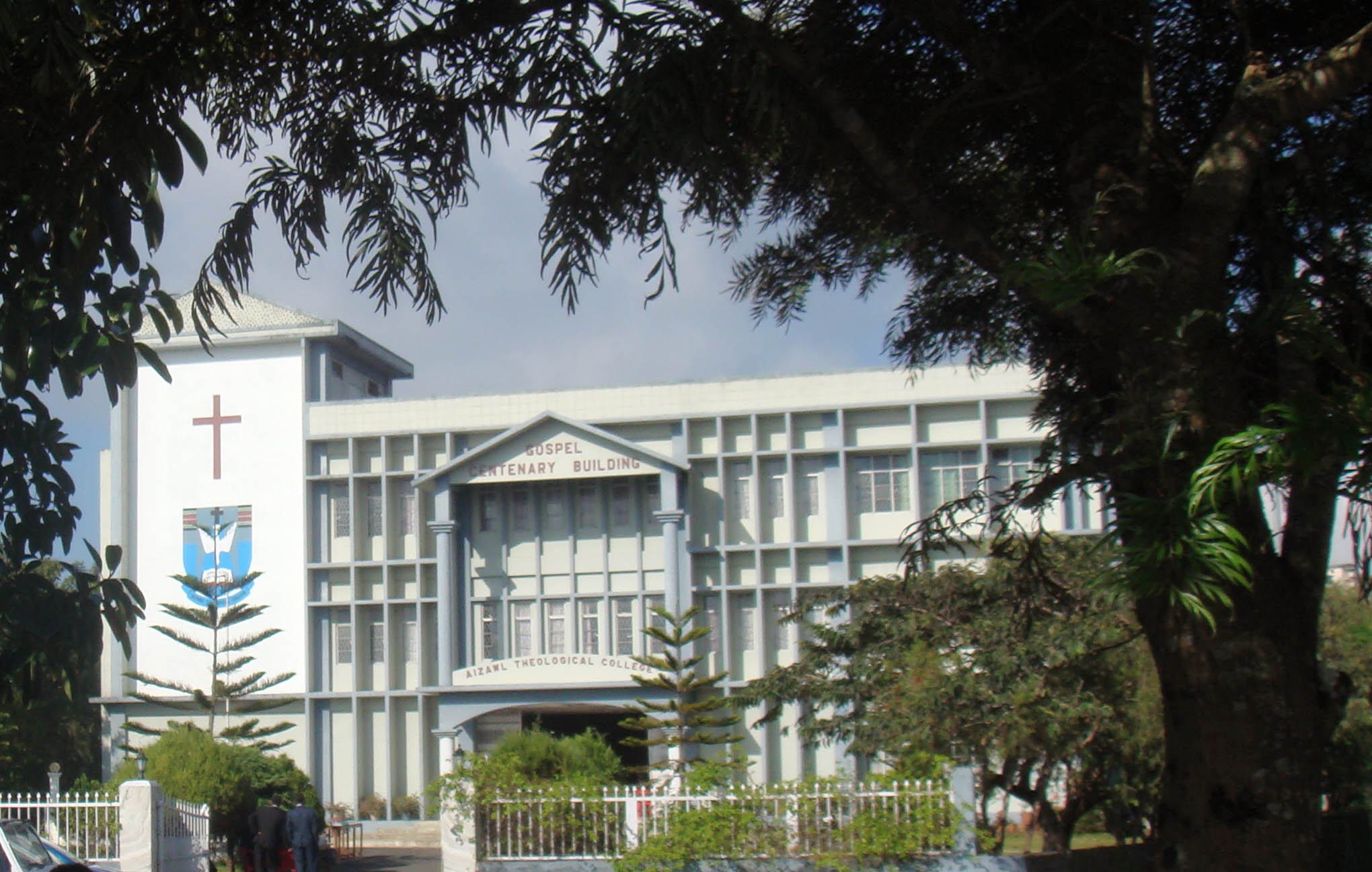
- Motto: Service to God and Humankind
- Established: 1907; 119 years ago
- Affiliations: Senate of Serampore College (University)
- Principal: Rev. Dr. K. Lalrinkima
- Location: Aizawl, Mizoram, India
- Campus: Urban
- Website: atc.edu.in

Aizawl Theological College is an ecumenical seminary of the Presbyterian Church in Aizawl, Mizoram, India. It is affiliated to the Senate of Serampore College (University). The college is owned by the Mizoram Presbyterian Church and administered by the Mizoram Synod through its Theological Education Board. Hundreds of pastors and church leaders have received their academic training and ministerial formation under the standards laid down by the Senate of Serampore College since its inception in 1907.

== Location ==
The College is located at the top of a mountain, north of Aizawl, at Durtlang.

== History ==
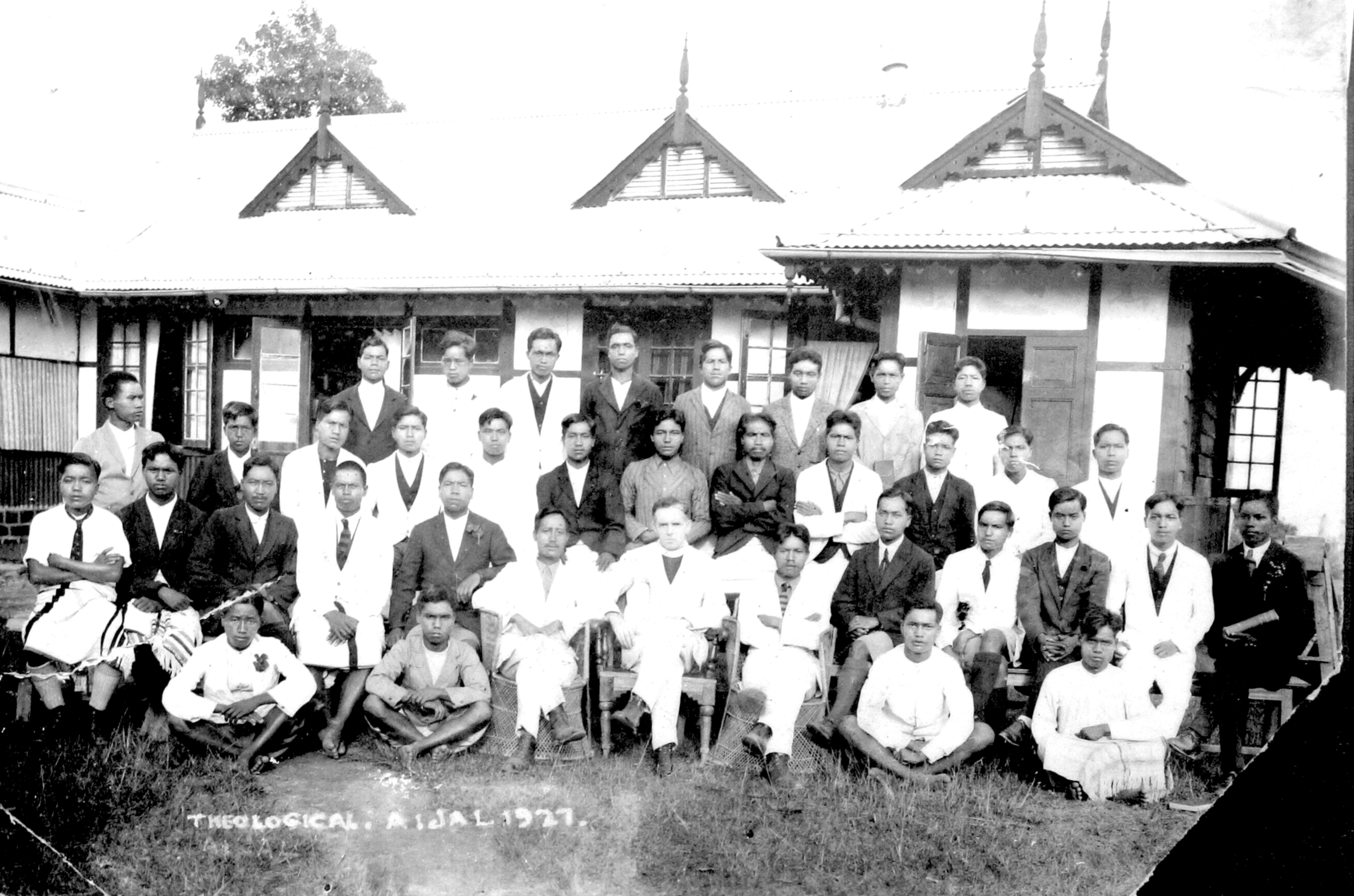
ATC Principal Rev. E. L. Mendus and scholars in 1927

Aizawl Theological College was started by Rev. David Evan Jones (missionary), popularly known as Pu Zosaphluia among the Mizos, in 1907 as a humble theological school to train native Christians for various ministries of the church. It was originally named "Aijal Theological School". In 1924, the theological school was shifted from Aizawl to Durtlang at the present site of the Presbyterian Hospital. Rev. F.J. Sandy managed the administration. But Sandy unexpectedly died and the school was moved back to Aizawl proper and headed by Rev. E.L. Mendus. The school was closed in 1937 affected by circumstances of the Second World War. It was revived in 1951 to become a proper theological college. Rev. J. Meirion Lloyd became the first designated Principal and the college was located at Mission Vengthlang, Aizawl. The Senate of Serampore College granted affiliation to the college at the level of Licentiate in Theology (L.Th.) in 1965. The college was then officially named "Aizawl Theological College."

When Rev. J. M. Lloyd returned to Wales he was succeeded by Rev. C. Pazawna who became the first Mizo Principal of the College. He remained in office for seventeen years. In 1971, the College was upgraded to the B. Th. level by the Senate of Serampore College, replacing the L. Th. diploma course programme. In 1994 that the Senate of Serampore College allowed Aizawl Theological College to start the B.D. programme. In June 1998 the Council for Academic Affairs of the Senate of Serampore College granted Aizawl Theological College the status of a full-fledged B.D. College. The Master of Theology (M.Th) programme in Christian Theology had been introduced since 2002 and M.Th. (New Testament and Missiology) and Doctor of Ministry (D.Min) respectively are also being introduced from 2007 academic session.

Welsh Principals of Aizawl Theological College

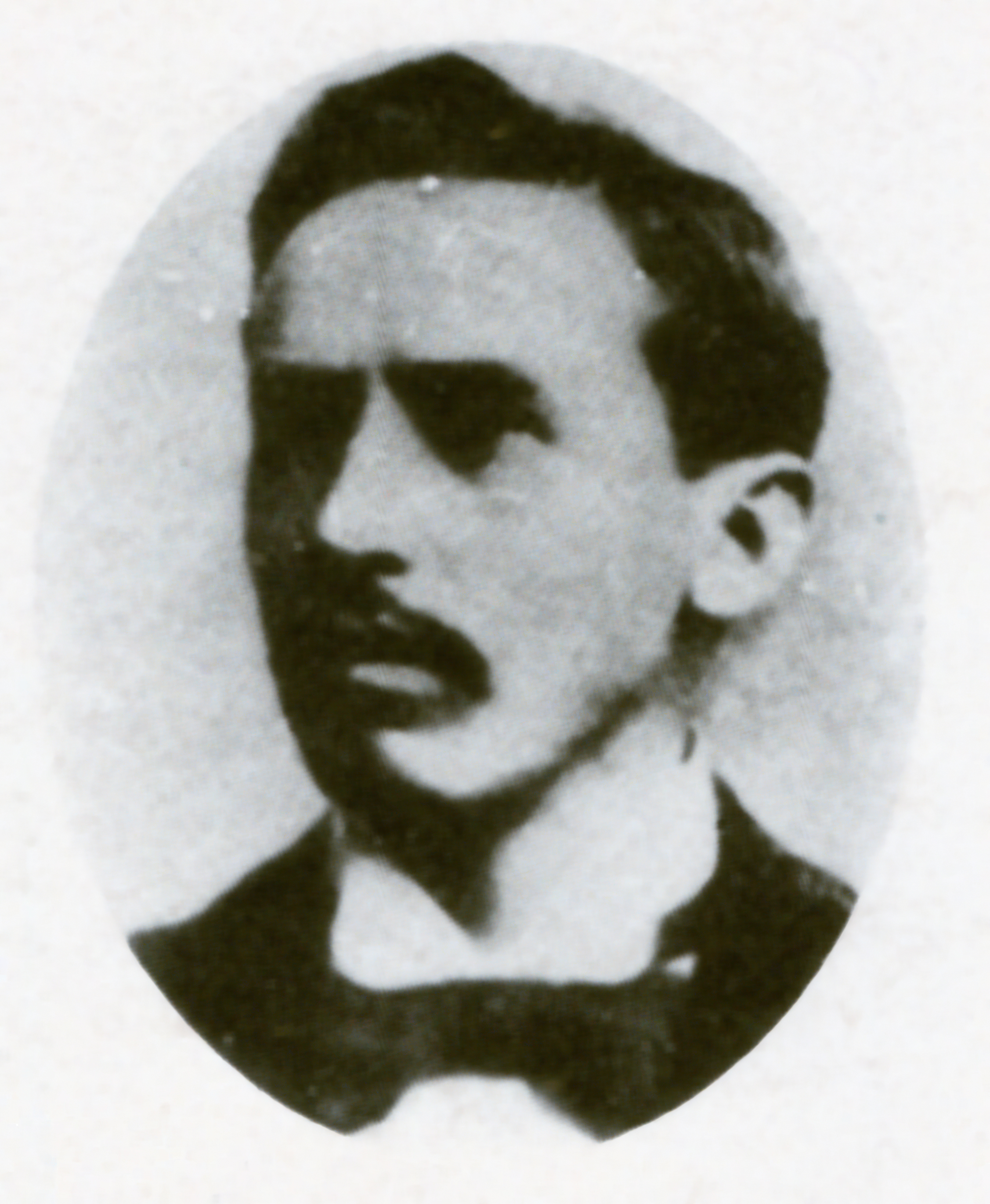
Rev. D.E. Jones
(1907-1923)
First Principal and Founder

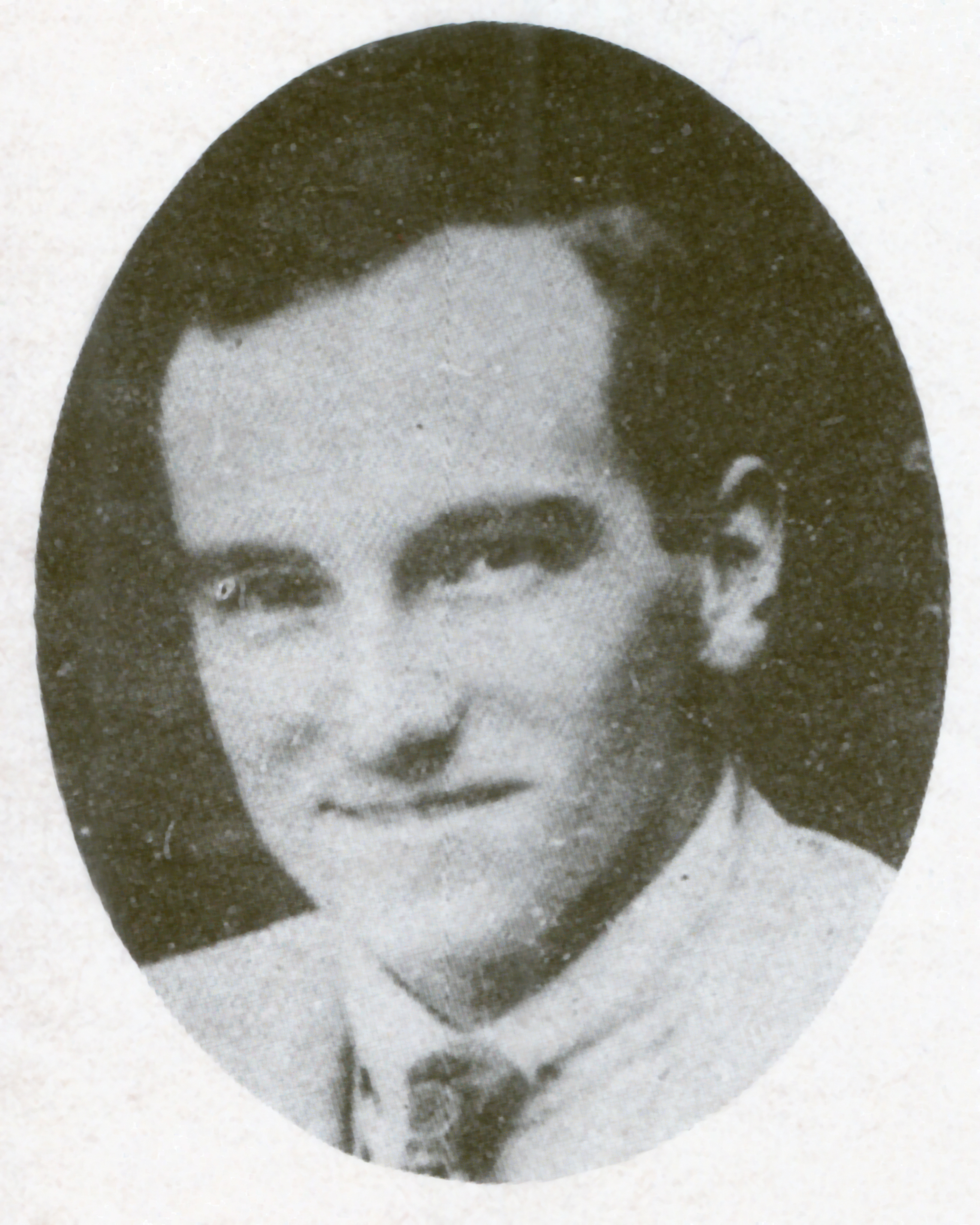
Rev. Frederick Joseph Sandy
(1923-1926)
Second Principal

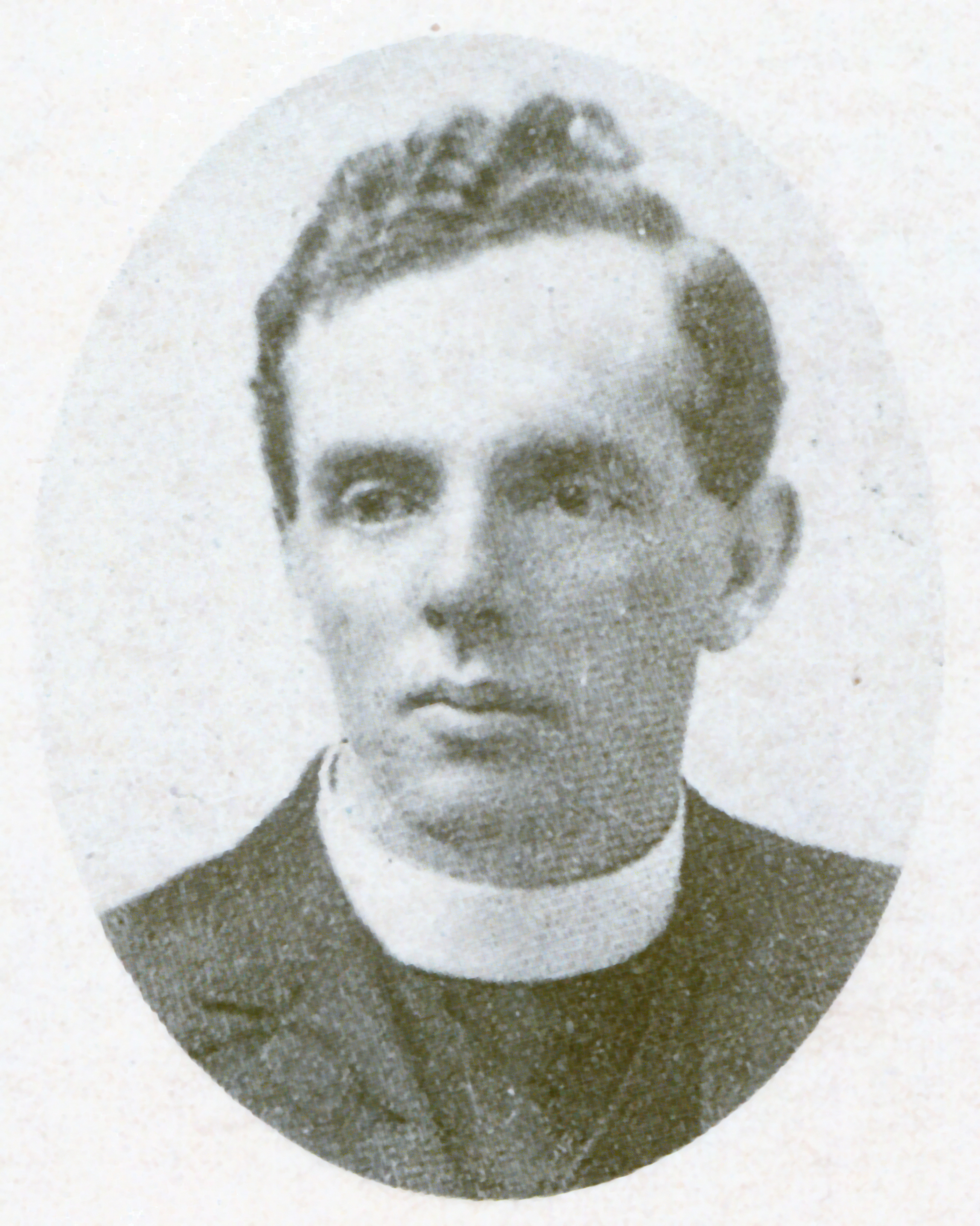
Rev. Enoch Lewis Mendus
(1926-1937)
Third Principal

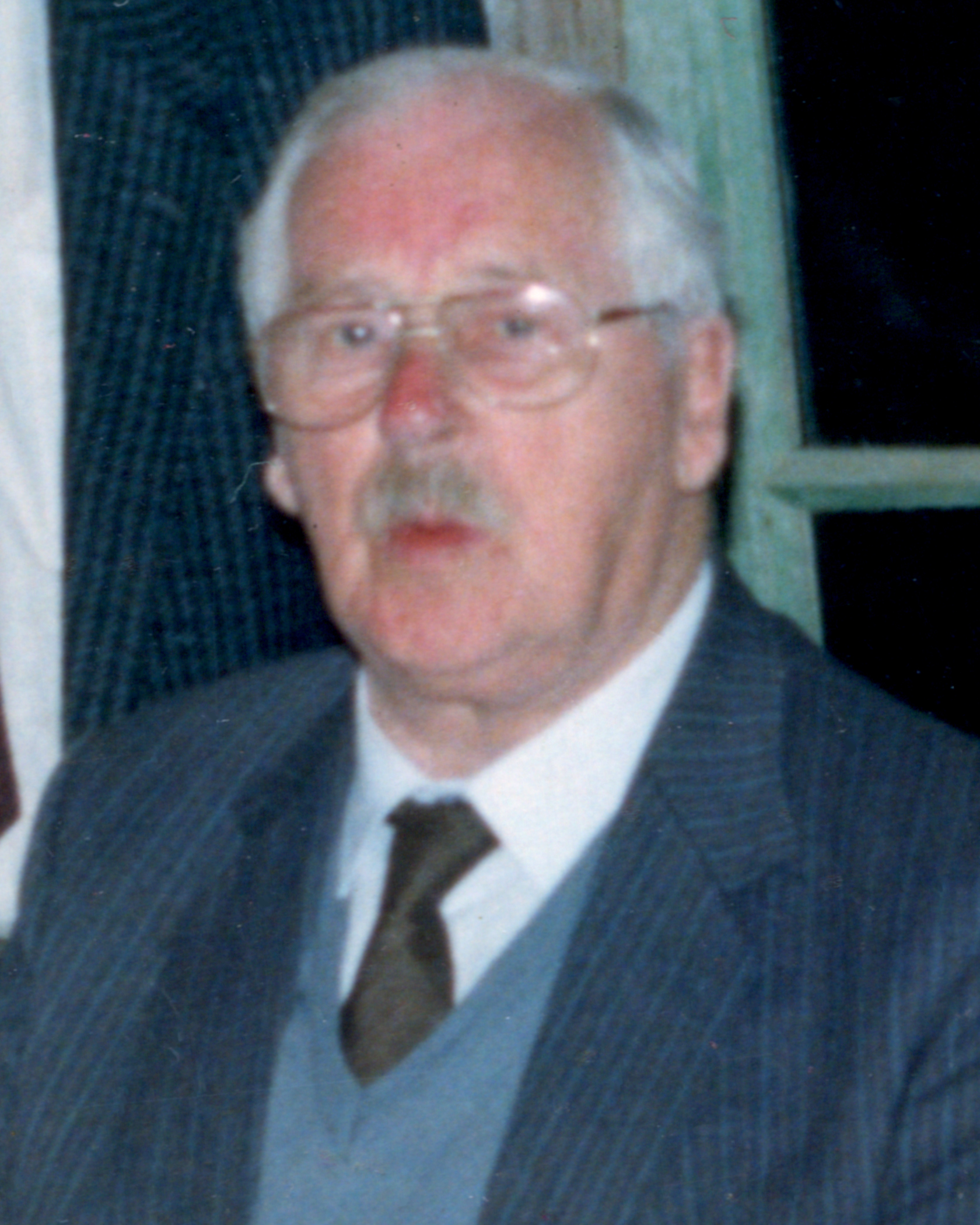
Rev. J. M. Lloyd
(1951-1964)
First Principal
(After revival)

List of Principals

(Name of the Principal, Period)

- Rev. D.E. Jones (1907-1923),
- Rev. F.J. Sandy (1923-1926),
- Rev. E.L. Mendus (1926-1937),
- Rev. J.M. Lloyd (1951-1964),
- Rev. C. Pazawna (1964-1981),
- Rev. Lalsawma Acting (1971-1974),
- Rev. Lalchhuanliana (1981-1986),
- Rev. C. Biakmawia (1986-1990),
- Rev. H. Remthanga (1990-1993),
- Rev. C. Rosiama (1993-1994),
- Rev. Dr. Zaihmingthanga (1994-1999),
- Rev. Dr. H. Vanlalauva (1999-2007),
- Rev. Dr. Roger Gaikwad (2008-2010),
- Rev. Dr. Vanlalchhuanawma (2011-2014),
- Rev. Dr. C. Lalhlira (2015-2018),
- Rev. Dr. Vanlalnghaka Ralte (2019-2021),
- Rev. Prof. Tlanghmingthanga (2022 -2025)
- Rev. Dr. K. Lalrinkima (2026-Present)

== Courses offered ==
Internal Study:

- Bachelor of Divinity (B.D)
- Master of Theology (M.Th)
- Doctor of Theology (D.Th)

External Study:

- Certificate Course in Christian Studies
- Bachelor of Christian Studies (BCS)
- Master of Christian Studies (MCS)
- Diploma in Clinical Pastoral Counselling (DCPC)

== Publications ==
- The Mizoram Journal of Theology, an academic journal is also published bi-annually since 1999.
- Didakhe, a bimonthly theological journal has been published since 1972, with a circulation of 4,700 copies. This is an important medium by which theological discussions on relevant issues are kept alive.
