= Zawngin =

Village in Mizoram, India

- Village
- Location of Zawngin in Mizoram, India Zawngin (India)
- Coordinates: 23.9028°N 93.0181°E
- Country: India
- State: Mizoram
- District: Saitual (formerly part of Aizawl)
- Block: Phullen

Government
  - Body: Village Council

Population (2011)
  - Total: 617

Languages
  - Official: Mizo, Hindi, English
- Time zone: UTC+05:30 (IST)
- PIN: 796261
- Area code: 0389
- Vehicle registration: MZ
- 2011 census code: 271221

Zawngin is a village in the Phullen community development block in the Saitual district, Mizoram, India. The nearest town is Phullen, 11 km by road.

According to the 2011 census of India, Zawngin has a population of 617 people living in 115 households, with a literacy rate of 90.7%. Zawngin has the postal PIN code 796261.

Zawngin is one of the constituent villages of the Sinlung Hills Council and falls under the Suangpuilawn constituency.

== Geography and climate ==
Zawngin is located in the hills that typical of this part of Mizoram. The climate is humid tropical with monsoons lasting from May through October.

== Notable people ==
Vanphunga (1868-1922), chief of Khandaih

== See also ==
- Aizawl
- Saitual district
