= Nikuala =

Zahau chief (c. 1839–1896), India

- Chief of Leng; Leng Lal
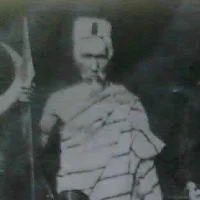
- Born: 1839; Ralleng
- Died: 1896 (aged 56–57); Sylhet (in custody)
- Spouse: Lalngurvungi
- Issue: Dokhama; Liannawla
- House: Zahau
- Father: Khawzaliana
- Religion: Sakhua

Nikuala (c. 1839-1896) was a Lushai chief of the Zahau clan in the eastern Lushai Hills which are in modern-day Mizoram in India. He was adopted by Vanhnuailiana and settled between the Mizos and the Chins and weakened the hold of Chin chiefs. Nikuala was victorious in keeping out the Chins and Lai from entering Mizoram. The British would capture Nikuala after the Chin-Lushai Expedition.

== Early life ==
Nikuala was one of five sons born to the Zahau chief Khawzaliana. He was born at Rallang village in Chin State of Myanmar in 1839. Nikuala, as a young boy, earned a reputation for his bravery and courage. One time, as a child, he carried cooked rice in his hand to his mother chopping firewood before he was attacked by a fierce hen. Nikuala engaged in combat with the hen until his mother rescued him. The result of the experience made the upas of the chief believe he would grow into a brave warrior.

Another time, Nikuala went to pelt birds with his friends but was attacked by a King Cobra. While his friends ran away, Nikuala had his back turned to the snake. When told to run, Nikuala refused without knowing why. When the snake hissed to bite him, Nikuala turned and aimed his slingshot at it in the middle of the neck. A second shot shattered the head of the snake and killed it immediately. His friends had already returned and informed of the snake attack and that Nikuala may have been killed. However Nikuala returned with the corpse of the snake in front of the village. As a result a ceremony was performed by his father by sacrificing a hog.

== Journey to Mizoram ==
There is no consensus among historians on how Nikuala entered the modern-day territory of Mizoram west of the Manipur River. Most have agreed on the narrative that the Mizo chiefs invited Nikuala, who was reputed for his bravery and prowess, to help deal with the Lai tribes. The Mizos were burdened by the Chins with taxes and raids, where individuals were killed and enslaved. Nikuala was invited to negotiate with the fierce tribes of Burma, such as the Falam, Suktê, and Haka Lai (Lushai: Halkha Lai). Nikuala arrived in Mizoram in 1857. He arrived at Chief Vanhnuailiana's village. Nikuala accepted under the condition of his father's assent since he was his father's protege. Vanhnuailiana sent five upas to Khawzaliana in Rallang. The negotiation promised Nikuala and independent village and the hand of Laltheri if she chose to marry Nikuala. Hence Nikuala became established in Mizoram upon his father's approval.

Nikuala lived in Vanhnuailian's circa 1,000 household settlement of Tualte. Laltheri did not accept Nikuala and so the marriage did not take place. Nikuala thus married Lalngurvungi and had a son named Vakmen. Vakmen in Nikuala's dialect meant "wanderer" or "nomad". However, Nikuala's foster brother and Vanhnuailian's son, Lalburha, opposed the name and encouraged "Dokhama" which was accepted. Nikuala accompanied Vanhnuailiana as a foster son and moved to Champhai. During Champhai, Nikuala dealt with a tiger at point-blank range after all other men failed to confront it.

== Chieftainship ==
Vanhnuailiana keeping to his promise granted Nikuala his own village. Nikuala ruled over 100 houses at Lesen village. Vanhnuailiana died in 1871. His sons, Doṭhiauva, Liankhama, Lalburha, Buangtheuva and Chhinhleia moved westerwards but Nikuala remained. Vanhnuailiana had promised Nikuala that if he had remained on the eastern side, his descendants would have uncontested right to settle the area. From Leisen, Nikuala migrated to Leithum to Vanzau. He continued migrating and from Vanzau went to Phuihnam and then Tlaikuang. At Tlaikuang, Nikuala experienced the mautam famine in 1880. Nikuala didn't fear the Chin chiefs to his east unlike the Sailos and thus this attracted more villagers to settle under his rule and raised the number of households to 400.

Nikuala made sure to migrate and only ever settle on land bordering Myanmar along the Tiau river. None of the Sailo chiefs disturbed Nikuala knowing he was the check on the aggression of the Chins. Nikuala also gained a pasalṭha Hrangleiah. Hrangleiah was brought by Nikuala's men to him after Hrangeliah killed a man and was no longer protected by his Chief Zaduha of Zawlsei village.

Nikuala fought against the various Lai and Chin tribes while at Bungzung. However, he was not content with his location and moved to a strategic location at Chawngtlai in 1887-1890. During this time both Tualte and Chawngtlai were under his rule and considered the same settlement. Nikuala visited Lalkhuma, the Chief of Kangzang (now Mualcheng), but was caught and imprisoned by Lalkhuma. He was imprisoned as revenge by Lalkhuma whose father Vûta had been captured by the Falam Chins and heavily ransomed for his freedom. Nikuala escaped after three months of imprisonment and gained an increased reputation for this feat. Nikuala planned revenge on Lalkhuma and planned to raid him, however, Lalburha his foster brother stopped him and pleaded him for mercy.

=== War with the Lai ===
Due to Nikuala's chieftainship, the Mizo chiefs were no longer forced to pay taxes and tributes to the Chiefs of Falam. The Falam chiefs continued their depradations by raiding the Mizos and taking their children as captives. Nikuala decided to retaliate against the hostilities of the Falam chiefs. However, the Lai tribes at Thlantlang and Halkha came to know of his attack and united to field a larger force. However, Nikuala was supported by the descendents of Vûta and the Fânai tribes when the intentions of the united Lai offensive was discovered.

The forested land of Khuanthing between the Tiau and Tuipui rivers was a disputed territory between Nikuala, Chief of Tlaikuang, and Sailuaia, Chief of Dawn. In 1880, Sailuaia cleared the forest and this raised tensions escalating into a war. The war between the two chiefs were fought with ambushing and guerilla warfare. The Zahau relatives of Nikuala also intervened on Nikua's behalf upon learning of the conflict. Mangcheuva, a close relative of Nikuala, raided Dawn village and took a head of a man from there.

After the Dawn village was defeated, the Khuangli tribes at Sunchung were attacked by Chief Vannawla of the Zahau. Vannawla requested the help of Nikuala who joined the conflict against the Khuangli. The Khuangli aware of Nikuala's attack prepoared defenses but after 6-7 hours of fighting were defeated. The Khuangli inhabitants of Sunchung termed the bravery of Nikuala and his warriors as a "tiger" as a result. After Sunchung, Nikuala sent his pasalṭhas Hrangleia and Vawmkaia to Lumler village who killed a giant man of the village.

Nikuala, following his victories, moved to Bungzung in 1882 and granted Tlaikuang to his relative Khawtinpara. However, Nikuala's absence encouraged the Halka Lai chief Vancheuva to raid Tlaikuang. Nikuala chased the war party up to the Tiau river and shot them from behind. One bullet wounded Vancheuva, the chief, in the thigh and broke the bone, allowing for his capture. In 1887, Nikuala shifted his village from Bungzung to Buang and continued the war with the Chins and Lai. Following Buang, he migrated to Chawngtlai in 1887-1890. Due to his many victories, the Chinese attempted to retaliate strongly. Their pasalṭhas Ralbilha and Chalnaka formed a war party to take vengeance on Nikuala. The party marched to Chawngtlai and crossed the Tiau river at Darzo. They crossed Muallianpui and went to north Vanlaiphai. As these villages were ruled by Fânai chiefs, Nikuala was warned of the impending war party and raid. Nikuala constructed a defensive plan with his pasalṭhas: Chawngluta, Lalbawnga and Aichhunga.

Nikuala planned to launch an ambush at Khawkai. While waiting for the war party, Chawngluta became restless and stood in the middle of the road disguised behind the branch of a tree. Ralbilha was spotted and attacked by Chawnluta who shot him at point blank range. Ralbilha following the honour code of warriors demanded Chawngluta to use his dao to kill him and take his head. Chawngluta obliged and the rest of the war party was killed and massacred.

Sometimes, the war Chin warriors marched towards Chawngtlai directly. The pasalṭhas formed a watchtower on Selawn Hill. Chhunkhuma and Lalbawnga were on duty in the pitch darkness of night. The Halkha Lai fired upon them but failed to kill anyone. The two warriors fired back in the dark of the night and killed the son of the chief leading the war party. Hranghleia pursued the party who tried to drag the body of their chief's son with them. He routed the enemies and struck down a warrior and took his head. However, the Halkha Lai warriors yelled back at them that his victim was of his own blood. The corpse examined proved to be his nephew, the son of his sister who married a Halkha Lai and lived in the Chin Hills.

Nikuala's continuous victories made Mizoram safe from the incursions of the Chins and the Lai. Taxation by the Falam chiefs ceased entirely. Nikuala also rescued the sons of Vanhnuailiana from Hmars who were attacking them.

=== Anglo-Lushai relations ===
Following the Chin-Lushai Expedition, the Chin Hills and the Lushai Hills were annexed by the British. Chiefs loyal to the British government used the power of the British to their advantage. Many rival chiefs of Nikuala made false charges of murder, plunder, pillaging. These charged levied were taken on by the British and a warrant was sent out for himi. Nikuala evaded the British until January 1892. He escaped once more in February but was betrayed by a British interpreter who made him leave his hideout. Nikuala was arrested and sent to Rangoon. At Rangoon his relatives visited him.

== Later life ==
Nikuala, who was betrayed, expressed his frustration by protesting the food in prison. He was forcefully fed by the prison guards and bit their hands in the process. Nikuala's term was extended to 20 years but then shortened. Before Nikuala was released, he killed the jail cook known as Saw Muang to wash off the burden of imprisonment. His term was further extended once more. Nikuala was sent to Calcutta and then Sylhet. He died of cholera in prison in 1896. Nikuala had two sons. His elder son, Dokhama, occupied Tualte while Liannawla became Chief of Kelkang.

== Sources ==
- Lalthangliana, B. (1989). Mizo Lal Ropuite [Great Mizo Kings] (in Mizo). Aizawl: R.T.M Press.
- Sailo, Ngurthankima (2010). "Nikaual (c 1939-1896)" (PDF). Historical Journal of Mizoram. X (1).
- Pachuau, Johntea. "Lal Ropui Nikuala" [Great King Nikuala]. Times of Mizoram (in Mizo).
