= Pasalṭha =

Class of Mizo warriors

The Pasalṭha (lit. 'good husband', Mara: Pasaipha, Paite/Tedim: Salpha) were a legendary class of warriors and military leaders among the Mizo people, known for their bravery, discipline, and embodiment of the Mizo ethical code, Tlâwmngaihna. This institution flourished from the medieval to the early modern period, symbolizing heroism and selflessness.

Famous Pasalṭha such as Vanapa, Khuangchera, Taitesena, Thanseia, and Keivawmhranga continue to inspire Mizos, with their stories romanticised and celebrated in song and folklore. However, the arrival of British colonial powers marked the decline of the Pasalṭha institution, as the British found their resistance formidable and sought to dismantle their influence.

== Etymology ==
Pasalṭha in the truest sense refers to a hero. The earliest use of the term was not brought up in the language texts written by T.H. Lewin, R.H.S. Hutchinson, John Shakespear and Edwin Rowlands who published texts on Mizo vocabulary. The first mention of the term pasalṭha was in James Herbert Lorrain and Frederick William Savidge's 1898 book: Grammar and Dictionary of the Lushai Language. Pasalṭha was defined as "bravery". However the term failed to reconcile the concept of a traditional Mizo hero in the context of becoming a warrior or hunter.

== Classification ==
Many pasalṭha were recorded from the knowledge of elders and the pasalṭha were not differentiated with warriors, tlawmngai (transl. follower of Tlâwmngaihna) or huaisen (transl. brave). Another close term hratkhawkheng refers to an individual who doesn't give up easily and fulfils objectives by all means. Another classification conflated with pasalṭha was ramvachal. Ramvachal was argued to constitute under the term as it could refer to pasalṭha who hunted in the thick forests or a simple individual who acquired forest produce.

== Role and purpose ==
According to James Dokhuma, "The Pasalṭha is not only a skilled hunter but also the one who is claimed to be famous for his prowess in taking heads of the enemies." In fact, a Pasalṭha typically brought multiple captives, totaling roughly ten. This hinged heavily on the Pasaltha's bravery and power. Undoubtedly, the Pasalṭha played significantly more prominent roles than others in pre-Christian Lushai culture. Its egalitarian nature can be seen in the fact that any commoner could achieve the title of Pasaṭtha by bravery and service to society. It was thus not a hereditary post.

Pasalṭha is described by Kipgen as "a brave and manly person" who demonstrated his character integrity through Tlâwmngaihna's actions. Such individuals were admired and respected not only in the zawlbuk, but also by the Lals of all neighboring villages and their inhabitants. They looked up to him and honored him during festivals as well. All of the requirements for training to become a Pasaltha were met at the zawlbuk. The Pasaltha exemplified the Lushai desire to preserve their way of life, dignity, and honour. He usually carried a long sword by his side, a symbol of his acute hunting abilities and responsibilities as the guardian of his town, its land, and its people.

For individuals of great bravery who failed to uphold values of tlâwmngaihna they were not considered a pasalṭha. Such as Lamsuaka, a warrior under Lalburha who was known as the Chhawkawm Keipui (transl. Tiger of the East). However due to his heinous crimes he was not considered a role model deserving to be remembered as a pasalṭha. A pasalṭha was also a source of prestige for a chief. Chiefs would woo heroes to live in their settlements. Lalsavunga was a chief who was reputed to have several pasalṭha in his chiefdom.

Pasalṭhas were also leaders in many ways. Individuals during wartime or hunting expeditions would refuse to leave the village without a pasalṭha by their side. During hunting, the spirit of tlâwmngaihna meant that a pasalṭha had to let elders hunt animals if anyone spotted one. A pasalṭha only shot wild animals for themselves if the hunting party did not have elders to confer priority to.

A pasalṭha was recognised and celebrated in social gatherings and festivals by offering the first glass of zû known as Huai No. A pasalṭha was also one of the individuals who had a chance to ascend to pialrâl in the afterlife.

== Cultural legacy ==
Mizo pasalṭhas began to be written down from oral history in publications such as The Mizo Heroes by the Tribal Research Institute. The values of tlâwmngaihna followed by the pasalṭhas are used to create role models and examples to the younger generation. In this sense, the history of pasalṭhas carry cultural heritage. Unlike folktale figures such as Chhurbura, Zawlpala and Lalruanga, the stories of pasalṭhas are fairly recent in a non-fiction sense but only extend as far as the 19th century. This implies that folk tales were possibly based on true figures who, over time, became distorted and romanticised over centuries.

=== Role in the MNF ===
The battalions used by the MNF during the Mizo National Front uprising were all named after famous pasalthas. Goswami argues this is a mechanism for the MNF to maintain continuity with their regional past. The pasalthas used the past during the movement lived in an era close to the British annexation of the Lushai Hills. The heroes were chosen from the immediate past as a way to continue a tradition of bravery among the volunteer fighters. In the past, the tradition of a pasaltha encompassed both chivalry and bravery in killing enemies and animals. However, the MNF utilised it exclusively in the enemy context. The names chosen were from the main Mizo ethnic group to maintain solidarity.

== Notable Pasaltha ==
The Tribal Institute, Art and Culture Department and the Government of Mizoram have listed 24 pasalṭha active during the precolonial and early colonial period of Mizo history.

- Khuangchera, anti-British resistance figure
- Saizahawla, wrestler and athlete
- Taitesena, volunteer and hunter
- Vana Pa, tactician and advisor
- Chawngbawla, warrior and duelist
- Zampuimanga, warrior and tiger hunter

== Sources ==
- Dokhuma, James (2003). Lamsuaka (in Mizo). Aizawl: R. Lalrawna.
- Goswami, B.B (1979). The Mizo Unrest: A Study of Politicisation of Culture. Jaipur: Aalekh Publishers.
- Songate, Paul Songhaulal; Lalngaihawmi, Mary (2017). "Mizo Heroes and their role in the society" (PDF). Historical Journal of Mizoram. XVIII (1).
- Rohmingmawii (2017). "Mizo Heroes in the Post-Colonial Context" (PDF). Historical Journal of Mizoram. XVIII (1).
- Rosanga, O. (2017). "Theorizing the concept Mizo Hero: An Indigenous perspective" (PDF). Historical Journal of Mizoram. XVIII (1).
