= North–South War of the Lushai Hills =

War between North and South Mizo chiefdoms

Chhim Leh Hmar Indo The War of the North and South
Date	1856–1859
Location	Lushai Hills
Result	Stalemate: North captures the South's young chief; Khawnglung massacre

Belligerents
Lalpuithanga; Thuama	Vuta; Vanhnuailiana

Commanders and leaders
Chawngbawla	Nghatebaka

The Chhim leh Hmar Indo, or the War of the North and South, was a civil war in the Lushai chiefdoms, taking place between 1856 and 1859 and widely considered one of the bloodiest conflicts among the Mizo people. The conflict arose due to a division in the Sailo family between the northern descendants of Lallula and the southern descendants of Rolûra. Several battles, including famous pasalṭha such as Chawngbawla, took place. The Khawnglung Massacre granted advantage to the northern faction before the mautam famine ended the conflict.

== Background ==
Chief Vûta, after defeating the Zadêng chiefs, continued to migrate his settlements until he settled in Hualtu. During this time, Vûta was famed for his prestige. In searching for a new settlement location, Vûta built a hut at the site of Buanhmun to establish a new village.

Rolûra's descendents had established themselves in the southern areas of the Lushai Hills. Rolûra's grandson, Chief Lalpuithanga, was the most powerful amongst his descendants. Lalpuithanga declared in regards to the northern chiefs that he would move and live adjacent to them as a check on them. At that time, Chief Vûta's rifle had been taken by Lalpuithanga's villagers. Despite requests for it to be returned, there was no response. Vûta, who was migrating from Hualtu, was crossing towards the new land of Buanhmun. However, before Vûta properly established himself and his subjects, Lalpuithanga occupied his house. Vûta continued to challenge Lalpuithanga's occupation and encouraged his subjects to migrate en masse until Lalpuithanga succumbed and retreated back to Vanchengte. Upon Lalpuithanga's retreat, Vûta composed a hla mocking him.

Mizo:

Buanhmun pai ang pawm tawh hnu,
Chengteah lam ang let e,
Lalpuithanga lema,
English:
After possessing Buanhmun,
Scuttled back to Chengte soon,

Lalpuithanga - the littles!

— Mizo Lal Ber Kairuma Sailo, Mizoram culture and Folklore

Vûta went to retrieve his rifle from Lalpuithanga. To accomplish this, he brought Lalpuiliana's son, his nephew, Thawmvunga, with him. Lalpuithanga was aware of the intentions of Vûta and Thawmvunga and prepared an ambush. They would ambush Vûta upon confronting him about the hla. Upon arrival, both men drank zû according to Mizo custom with Lalpuithanga and his upas (transl. elders). Lalpuithanga questioned Vûta by reciting the hla back to him. When confronted, Vûta claimed a separate lyric such as "Lalpuithang lenna" (transl. "Lalpuithanga settled").

Thawmvunga, who observed the situation, took out his dao (transl. sword) and began to swing it above the heads of the upas in a sword dance. The men were subdued temporarily as he forced them to sing the hla. During the chaos, the hearth shelf (rapchang) crashed down. Thawmvunga lifted the gun and took it from the wall and exited with Vûta out of the chief's house. Lalpuithanga's upas attempted to confront them and take the gun back in which a struggle ensued. Thawmvunga angrily shouted "Chuti main i kalpui thei lo vang" (transl. "You can't just take it away, I'm going home"). In the struggle, Thawmvunga took out his dao and began to saw the barrel of the rifle and thus making the upas let go. However, as he and Vûta took off, a volley was fired at them which was considered a declaration of war.

== Conflict ==
=== Battle of Vanchengte ===
Vûta with his brother's grandson, Vanhnuailiana, led a party to invade Lalpuithanga's capital settlement of Vanchengte. The party of men assembled and raided Vanchengte. However, it was poorly composed and weak. They were forced to retreat, and Vanhnuailiana, leading his war party, lost many men and lost his vakul (transl. Bhimraj tail feather) on his headress.

=== Battle of Hmunṭha ===
Lalpuithanga's daughter Zathawma led a war party to the settlement of Hmunṭha. Zathawma however, was heavily wounded in the battle and skirmish with being shot in the nose and a sword slicing her ear. The southern forces stopped advancing due to Zathawma's injuries.

=== Battle of Sialhmûr ===
The battle fo Sialhmûr was reputed for the battle between the famous pasalṭhas, Chawngbawla and Nghatebaka (Chawngzika). Chawngbawla was the pasalṭha of the south while Nghatebaka belonged to the north. They confronted each other and Nghatebaka was forced to chase down Chawngbawla. During the chase, the southern warriors continued to shout Chawngbawla's absence. However after running a long distance, Chawngbawla ambushed and shot Nghatebaka to death.

=== Battle of Arte ===
Mângpawrha's sons, Suakpuilala and Thâwmpâwnga were leading Kâwkpui and Arte respectively. The south invaded Thâwmpâwnga's village of Arte. Thâwmpâwnga was a brave chief but was unable tor resist the invasion.

=== Khawnglung Massacre ===
Khâwnglung was the village of Thuama (Lalpuithanga's brother) which was closely located to Khuanglum led by the Fânai Chief Khawtindâla who was an ally of Vûta. Vûta's sons, Lalngauva and Lalvunga participated in the raid themselves with the Fânai. Vûta had informed his sons to not return unless they had killed the enemy. Peace overtures were successfully made with the Haka Lai tribes in order to carry out the raid. Khawnglung was surrounded by cliffs, and its main exit and entrance was an adjustable bridge that was disassembled at night. The rocky crevice would make traversing into Khawnglung difficult. However, the bridge was left assembled and the war party snuck in at midnight. The party rushed into the zawlbûk and killed all the warriors before they could wake up and organise a defence.

Undefended, the village of Khawnglung was massacred. Many women were killed in the lanes and streets of the village. Children and young women were taken captives and taken away to the raiding party's villages. Thuama's wife and his son, Lalhleia, were captured by the Pawi. Lalnguauva and Lalvunga brought Lalhleia to Vûta. Vûta's children tried to negotiate with the Pawi but they refused and took the captives into Haka and Falam as bawi. Lalhleia remained with Vûta, while his mother was taking by the Pawi.

=== Origin of the word Pawi ===
It is believed that the term Pawi, a disparaging name used for the Lais, originated during this war. According to legend, a Southern Lai Pasalṭha (warrior) was cornered by Northern Pasalṭhas. Defiant to the end, the warrior declared himself a leopard—"Keima pawte"—in his dialect. Northerners unfamiliar with the Lai language misheard it as "pawite," leading to the Lais and their kin being referred to as the Pawi or Pawite.

=== Conclusion of the war ===
The three-year conflict left no clear victor, though the northern principalities were believed to have fared slightly better. The war ended abruptly in 1859 due to the Mautam famine, a natural disaster that devastated the region and forced both sides to abandon the fighting.

== Impact and legacy in modern Mizoram ==
The Chhim leh Hmar Indo had a profound and lasting impact on Mizoram’s history and culture. The conflict weakened Mizo states, leaving them vulnerable to British conquest. The British further exacerbated the divisions by splitting Mizoram into the North and South Lushai Hills.

The war also deepened sociocultural divides. The Church in Mizoram was similarly split, with the North becoming predominantly Presbyterian and the South largely Baptist. These differences persist to this day, along with lingering competition and occasional bitterness between the two regions.

== Sources ==
- Zokima (1993). Mizo Lal Ber Kairuma Sailo [Mizo King Kairuma Sailo] (in Mizo). Aizawl: V.L.B. Press.
- Lalthangliana, B. (2005). Culture and Folklore of Mizoram. India: Publications Division.
- Liangkhaia (1938). Mizo Chanchin [Mizo History] (in Mizo). Aizawl: L.T.L. Publications.
