= T. B. C. Lalvenchhunga =

Indian politician

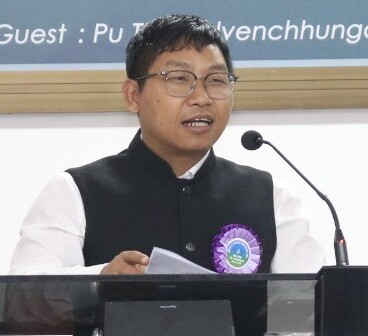
- T. B. C. Lalvenchhunga in 2024

Member of the Mizoram Legislative Assembly
- Incumbent
- Assumed office 2023
- Constituency: Aizawl West

Personal details
- Born: 28 December 1982 (age 43) Kelkang, Champhai, Mizoram, India
- Party: Zoram People's Movement

T. B. C. Lalvenchhunga (born 28 December 1982) is an Indian politician from Mizoram. He is currently Advisor to CM (Finance) Mizoram. He is a member of the Mizoram Legislative Assembly and was elected from the Aizwal West 1 Assembly constituency in the 2023 Mizoram Legislative Assembly election representing the Zoram People's Movement.

== Early life and education ==
Lalvenchhunga is from Kelkang, Champhai District, Mizoram. He is the son of TBC Lalthangliana. He married Lalremsiami and they have four children. He passed Class 10 in 1998 from HSLC board.

== Career ==
=== Indian Navy Serviceman ===
Lalvenchhunga is a retired petty officer of the Indian Navy who served for 15 years before entering politics.

=== MP Candidate ===
Prior to his tenure as an MLA, Lalvenchhunga contested the 2019 Lok Sabha election from Mizoram as a candidate of the People's Representation for Identity and Status of Mizoram Party (PRISM). In that election, he received 13,323 votes, amounting to 2.67% of the total vote share, and did not win the seat.

=== MLA ===
Lalvenchhunga is a first time member of the Mizoram assembly and was elected in the Aizwal West 1 Assembly constituency representing the Zoram People's Movement in the 2023 Mizoram Legislative Assembly election. He polled 11,872 votes and defeated his nearest rival, Zothantluanga of the Mizo National Front, by a margin of 4,667 votes. He is currently the chairman of a CSR cell in Mizoram.
