= Vanhnuailiana =

Chief of the Eastern Lushai Hills (d.1871)

- Chief of Lungdup; Lungdup Lal
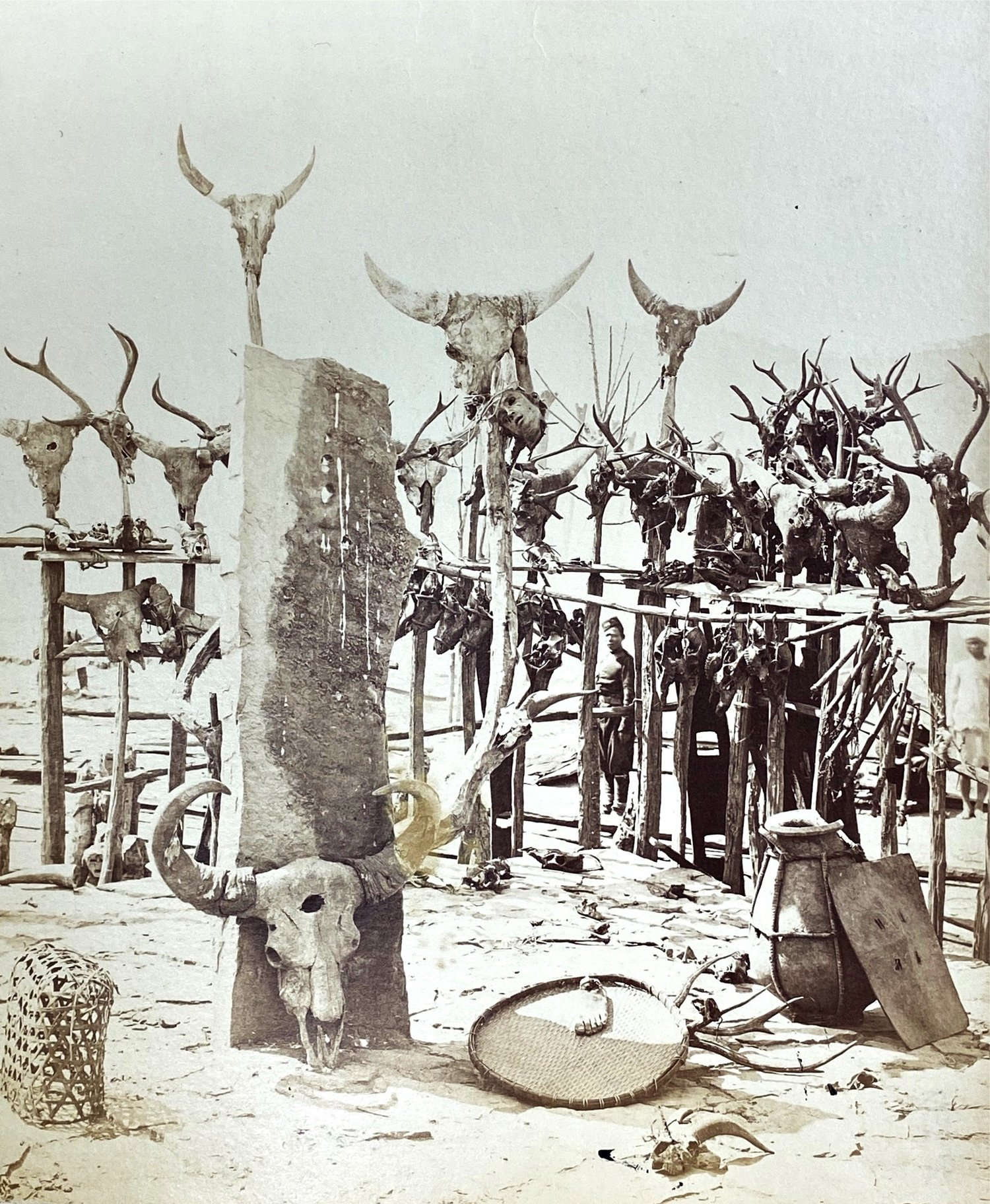
- Vanhnuailiana's tomb, photographed by Colonel H.G. Woodthorpe
- Predecessor: Lalsavunga
- Successor: Rolianpuii
- Born: c. 1800
- Died: 1871 (aged 70–71); Lawihmun
- Burial: February 1872; Lawihmun
- Spouse: Rolianpuii
- Issue: Deuti, Lemkham, Ropuiliani, Lalbura, Bengtewa
- House: Sailo
- Father: Lalsavunga
- Religion: Sakhua

Vanhnuailiana (English: Vonolel (Note: variation: Vánhailen, Banoilen, Vanolel); lit. 'the greatest of all under the skies'; c. 1800 - 1871) was the chief of the Eastern Lushai Hills. Vanhnuailiana expanded his influence over the Sukte and Poi tribes in the east and attempted incursions into Naga territories in Manipur. He was considered the most powerful chief in the Eastern Lushai Hills until his death in 1871. He presided over several conflicts during his period of chieftainship.

== Chieftainship ==
Vanhnuailiana's father, Lalsavunga, originally migrated his settlement from Champhai to Saitual. It is estimated that Lalsavunga died in 1849 hence allowing Vanhnuailiana to inherit chieftainship. Other sources place Lalsavunga's death earlier such as 1820 and Vanhnuailiana's rule beginning in 1818. After the North-South War between his uncle Vuta and the Southern Chief Lalpuithanga, Vanhnuailiana left Saitual to Tualte.

=== Old Tualte ===
Tualte was one of the largest settlements in pre-colonial Mizo history. The earliest confirmation of its existence was in 1861 despite existing before from an unknown date. The settlement was estimated to consist of over 1000 households. Unlike other notable settlements, which were confederations, Vanhnuailiana was the sole chief of this settlement. Vanhnuailiana's leadership in Tualte is accompanied by legendary figures in Mizo history known as Pasaltha, which he inherited from his father, Lalsavunga. The settlement boasted 12 heroic personalities namely: Vanapa, Chawngduma, Keihawla, Tawkthiala, Zampuimanga, Chhunkeuva, Darbuta, Chalkhenga, Darruma, Darphawka, Darkuala and Zabiaka. However, Tualte was forced to disperse due to the onset of mautam famine in 1861.

=== Conquests in the Lushai Hills ===
After the death of his father Lalsavunga, Vanhnuailiana kept his promise to his father or pushing up towards the north. Vanhnuailiana left Lamzawl in Saitual to push the Pawis. When the Pawis heard this they attacked the Lusei and killed them. Vanhnuailiana was angered at this and targeted their chief, who was known to walk in the countryside. They shot the chief but his men took cover behind the foot of a tree and fought against the Luseis. Eventually the Pawi were defeated and fled. The Pawis were chased by a party led by Vana Pa. Fighting continued for several days. The Pawi attempted to fight near Kawlkulh with an ambush but retreated after being fought back. The Pawi eventually crossed two rivers and settled for camp. The sentry on guard also fell asleep. A pasalṭha named Tawkthiala proposed to Vana Pa for him to catch any guard in the fields and for him to shoot them. Vana Pa, however did not agree. As Tawkthiala and Chawngduma took their guns, Vana Pa decided to permitted to fire. The Pawi chief's friend who was sleeping on the floor was shot dead. The Luseis then went to a safe place and used the darkness as cover to fight before leaving the camp. The next morning, Tawkthiala attempted to fight again to fight as a leader and capture the body of their victim in the camp. However Vana Pa instead professed that many Pawis had died and their party was unharmed, as a result they returned back.

Vanhnuailiana also began a war against the Sukte clans. Vanhnuailiana's house was burnt down during the night and the night patrol stated that a Sukte tribesman had committed the act. This prompted Vanhnuailiana to wage war on the Sukte tribes. He commanded the Pasalṭha in the Zawlbuk to find any Sukte they could find north of Lentlang and to kill them. Vanhnuailiana recalled his men soon after realizing his orders had been too impulsive. However five men could not be called back. A skirmish occurred in which the Lusei men killed a Sukte before they faced retaliation. In a panic they fled and threw away two guns in which the Sukte shot one of the Lusei dead. Vanhnuailiana sent an upa to confess that the men were robbers not under his control but the Sukte refused to listen.

Eventually a peace agreement was reached between Vanhnuailiana and the Sukte. A non-aggression pact was made with agreements to surrender captives and return runaway slaves escaping to enemy territories.

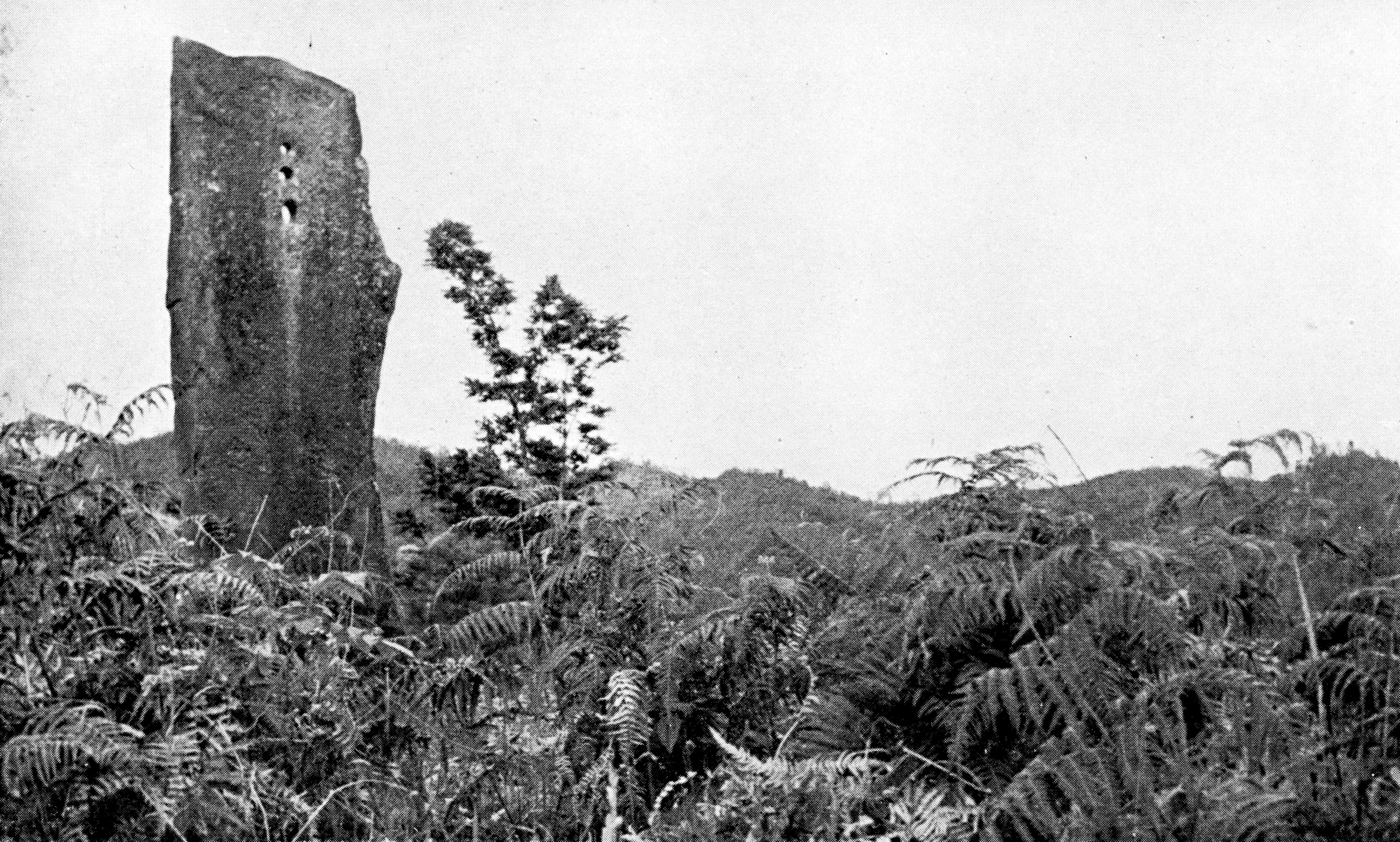
Tomb of Vanhnuailiana

=== War of East and West ===
Vanhnuailiana later moved from Tualte to Lundup (west of Kelkang, near Buang). He sent his son Dothiauva (Deuti) to rule Kelkang. Hostilities with the Western Lushai chiefs erupted due to Khalkam's wish to take a maiden named Tuali who was betrothed to Vanhnuailiana's son, and migrations of settlements becoming too close during jhum cultivation.Khalkam's attempt at capturing Tuali failed in the end.

=== Manipur Conflict ===
Vanhnuailiana began expanding his influence in Manipur in 1853. Vanhnuailiana succeeded in driving out the previous tribes of the Manipur frontier, namely the Khongjai and Kom Kukis. Vanhnuailiana attempted to invade another Khongjai village where his war party suffered 10 deaths as opposed to 2 deaths of the settlement who possessed mounted men. An outpost was established at the point fo entry in the valley. In 1856, the village of Nomidong (which had previously been raided by Lushais before) was cut up and destroyed. The Manipuri officials did not ascertain the responsibility of the raid to the Lushais or Khongjais.

In 1858, the Lushais attacked the Thana of Kala Naga with 500 warriors and destroyed it. They would return three months later before the sepoy villages could be reinforced and overran them again. The Lushais returned a third time and burnt a village before being ambushed by Manipuri reinforcements. A total of ten Lushais were captured and were detained for 3-4 years. However, nine of them would escape custody before their sentence ended. The last remaining prisoner was a relative of Vanhnuailiana, so William McCulloh entered into negotiations with Vanhnuailiana who agreed to not raid into Manipuri territory. Vanhnuailiana upheld the agreement with McCulloh. The promise was kept till 1868. In 1868, the Lushais made raids on Mukti, Nungdang and burnt down the Kala Naga stockade. Chatterjee argues this was due to the replacement of McCulloh with Brown. Brown failed to control the warring hill tribes in their internal disputes which escalated conflict into raiding once more.

=== Anglo-Lushai Relations ===
Vanhnuailiana's tomb illustrated during the Lushai Expedition

John Edgar, Deputy Commissioner of Edgar, described Vanhnuailiana as a great fighter whose extended his territories beyond Champhai. Early in his rule as chief, Vanhnuailiana subdued the petty chiefs of the Eastern Lushai Hills before directing his efforts south of his territory. The south of Vanhnuailiana's territory consisted of Poi (Chin) tribes. Vanhnuailiana subdued the Pois and took many captive. He carried out a policy of displacement by resettling them across his territory. After subduing the Poi chiefs, Vanhnuailiana also successfully defeated the chiefs of the Sukte clan. Vanhnuailiana repeated his policy of resettling conquered chiefdoms into his newly expanded territory.

Vanhnuailiana cooperated with the British in 1864 alongside Sukpilal in Silchar. Both chiefs were offered an annual grant of rs. 600 by preserving peace on the frontier and regularly sending tributes. However, the expansion of tea estates on the borders of the Lushai Hills deteriorated the relations of the two parties with the British.

Vanhnuailiana met with Captain Stewart on 2 April 1866 in Silchar. Vanhnuailiana questioned whether Stewart had demanded tributes from Eastern Lushai chiefs such as Mulla. Vanhnuailiana pointed out that Mulla had requested an amount of tribute to be paid off to the British. Stewart, in response, assured Vanhnuailiana the tribute is Mulla's responsibility alone. Stewart provided Vanhnuailiana with immunity from giving tribute to the British. Vanhnuailiana's meeting with Stewart was seen as a sign of goodwill to continue conciliation and cooperation with the Lushai chiefs.

== Biography ==
Eastern Lushai Chiefs Family Tree

Lallula
Mângpawrha	Lallianvunga	Lalpuiliana	Vûta	Neipuithangi
Suakpuilala	Ngûra	Lalphunga	Thâwmvunga	Lalsavunga
Vanpuilala	Pâwibâwia	Lalruma	Chenglena	Vanhnuailiana	Laltheri
Lalhleia	Doțhiauva	Liankhama	Ropuiliani	Lalburha	Buangtheuva
Thangkâma	Vanphunga	Lalruaia	Lalthuama
Langthanglula	Sanglura	Lalvunga	Lungliana	Kairûma	Lalkhûma

=== Death ===
Vanhnuailiana's Tomb illustrated in James Grant's "Cassell's Illustrated History of India, Volume 2"

Vanhnuailiana died during the onset of the Lushai Expedition. His tomb was found well preserved with many posts and heads. The inside of the tomb held a broken Burmese idol. The tomb was decorated with a large mithun skull with horns impaling and carrying a human head and arm recently cut off. A foot was found outside the tomb. The expedition identified the remains of the headhunting remnants as the Sukte villagers who had been attacked earlier. The expedition hoisted a British flag on a bare tree and declared that the goal of reaching Vanhnuailiana's stronghold had been reached in the name of Queen Victoria and the Viceroy. The expedition burned down Vanhnuailiana's settlement but left his tomb intact, changing only the headhunted remains into a proper burial place.

During the Lushai Expedition many of the Pois and Suktes resettled in Champhai were anxious to leave during the chaos of the expedition. Before the expedition, many were afraid of bringing harm to their families in attempting to escape to the Chin Hills. The Pois and Sukte villagers often defected to the military encampments under General Nuthall to escape.

=== Legacy ===
Frederick Sleigh Roberts who participated in the Lushai Expedition named his horse, an arab charger, Vonolel in honour of the chief and his prestige.

In 2021, the discovery of a new snake species in Mizoram was named Stoliczkia vanhnuailianai in honour of Vanhnuailiana.

== Sources ==
- Chatterjee, Suhas (1985). Mizoram under British Rule. Delhi: Mittal Publications.
- Chatterjee, Subhas (1995). Mizo Chiefs and the Chiefdom. New Delhi: M D Publications PVT LTD. ISBN 81-85880-72-7.
- Dun, E. W. (1992) [1886], Gazetteer of Manipur, Manas Publications – via archive.org
- Hutchinson, R.H Sneyd (1906). An Account of the Chittagong Hill Tracts. Calcutta: Bengal Secretariat Book Depot.
- Khiangte, Hosana Lalenvela (2021). "Resistance to the Colonial Rule through Evasion and Denial of Service in the Southern Lushai Hills". Historical Journal Mizoram. 22 (1).
- Lalthangliana, B (2005). Culture and folklore of Mizoram. Publications Division Ministry of Information & Broadcasting. ISBN 978-81-230-2658-9.
- Lalthangliana, B (1989). Mizo Lal Ropui (in Mizo). Aizawl: R.T.M Press.
- Liangkhaia (1938). Mizo Chanchin (Mizo History) (in Mizo). Aizawl. p. 56.
- National Army Museum. "General Sir Frederick Sleigh Roberts, on His Horse 'Vanhnuailiana'". Art UK. "Roberts purchased his Arab charger 'Vanhnuailiana' while he was still a major, soon after the Lushai Expedition in India (1871–1872). In this campaign he defeated the son of a locally renowned chief and named his horse after him."
- Nunthara, C (1996). Mizoram: Society and Polity. New Delhi: Indus Publishing Company. p. 42. ISBN 81-7387-059-4.
- Pacha, Aswathi (6 July 2021). "In Mizoram, a new snake species gets named after local warrior Vanhnuailiana". Indian Express. Kochi.
- Verghese, C.G.; Thanzawna, R.L. (1997). A History of the Mizos. New Delhi: Vikas Publishing House.
- Woodthorpe, R.S (1873). The Lushai Expedition: 1871-1872. London: Hurst and Blackett Publishers.
- Zorema, J (2007). Indirect Rule in Mizoram. New Delhi: Mittal Publications. ISBN 978-81-8324-229-5.
- Zou, David Vumlallian (2018). "Vai phobia to Raj nostalgia: Sahibs, chiefs and commoners in colonial Lushai Hills". Modern Practices in North East India. Routeledge. ISBN 9781138294257.
