= Taitesena =

Mizo Warrior and hunter (1882-1904)

Pasalṭha Taitesena Khiangte
- Born: Ralthatchhunga; January 1882; Khawrihnimah
- Died: 1904 (aged 21–22); Sehrmun
- Cause of death: Tiger attack
- Burial place: Sehrmun
- Spouse: Thangrikhumi
- Military career
- Known for: Folk hero

Pasalṭha Taitesena born Ralthathchhunga was a famous Mizo warrior, hunter, and volunteer. He is considered an idol of Mizo youths for his virtue of Tlawmngaihna.

== Early life ==
Taitesena was born in January 1882 as Ralthatchhunga to a Khiangte family. Due to his healthy red cheeks he gained the nickname Taitesena. Taitesena was from Hrangvunga's village of Serhmun which was not far from another famous Pasalṭha known as Khuangchera. After his family moved from Khawrinimah, they would settle in Tuahzawl where Khuangchera would be established with his wife and two children.

== Pasaltha ==
One night, Hrangvunga, the chief wished to discover who was the bravest, loyal, dependable and selfless man among his subjects. He summoned an upa and told him to visit the zawlbuk to tell the men that an important message has to be sent for his brother across the river. The urgency of the message required it to be done despite the dark of the night and heavy rain. Hrangvunga himself doubted any men would take on the favour but persisted in trying.

The upa was not told the message but only to find a man to be summoned for the request. The upa left to the zawlbuk and woke up the young men to convey the chief's request. No one was ready to go so late at night in heavy rain where wild animals may lurk. Taitsena who was sleeping in one of the corners already got up and adorned his garments. Walking back with the upa, Taitesena questioned what the message was which the upa could not answer as he didn't know either. Taitesena was instructed to speak to the chief in confidence.

When Taitesena arrived at Hrangvunga's residence, he asked for the errand. Hrangvunga revealed that there was no need for an errand tonight. Due to threats and enemies, Hrangvunga wanted to know who he could depend on for trust. Hrangvunga invited Taitesena for a drink of zu. Taitesena initially refused, considering the chief's rest and sleep during a late night. This consideration further impressed the chief. Hrangvunga insisted Taitesena to drink. They both drank and gossiped the night as an honour a chief very rarely bestows. Taitesena would often receive such an honor but he would be disciplined never to intoxicate himself or indulge in mischief.

Taitesena was famed for his ethical code. He was reputed for never complaining or expressing anger. During hunts in the jungle he would never take more than three spoons of rice at the astonishment of others. Taitesena also excelled in Mizo sports such as javelin throw, shotput and wrestling.

== Death ==
Taitesena, as a pasaltha, was a renowned hunter. In Serhmun three other Pasalṭha were also renowned. They were, Zingkela Ralte, Vuntawna Palian and Dozika Ralte. The village of Sehrmun was distressed by a man-eater tiger's presence. The tiger was elusive and unable to be killed by the villagers. The tiger was only wounded from a trap placed for it but it escaped and continued to ravage the village. The villagers took up defense with weapons and cornered the tiger. The four Pasalṭha Zingkela, Vuntawna, Dozika and Taitesena were the first to arrive and attack the tiger. Vuntgawna was the only one with a firearm. He fired three rounds but missed. Zingkela rushed in with his dao but dislocating his shoulder blade during the fight. Vungtawna attempted to fend off the tiger with his rifle but it went for his head. Dozika with a dao rushed to help Vungtawna. A village youth attempting to help the Pasalṭhas mistimed a spear thrust and injured Dozika in the neck. Taitesena finally arrived and struggled before he was caught in by the tiger and fractured his thigh. Eventually the villagers overpowered and killed the maneater.

Taitesena and the other Pasalṭhas refused to place themselves in stretchers despite serious wounds. Dozika however lost his ability to walk and had to be carried. He would die soon after reaching his home. The Pasalṭhas would soon succumb to their wounds, which would drown out the celebration of the tiger's death. During the last moments of Taitesena and the Pasalṭhas there were no complaints of pain. Taitesena's mother visited him to ask about the pain, but he rebuked her for abandoning him which hurt him more than his dying state. Taitesena would die in 1904.

== Sources ==
- Lalbiakthanga (1978). The Mizos: A Study in Racial Personality. Guahati: United Publishers.
- Khualluna, R. (1992). Mizo Pasaltha Taitesena Chanchin (in Mizo). Mizoram: Young Mizo Association Press Board.
- Kumar, Satinder (2000). Encyclopaedia of South Asian Tribes. Anmol Publications.
