= Zampuimanga =

Mizo Pasalṭha

Pasalṭha Zampuimanga Chhakchhuak-Hualngo
- Born: 1801; Zampui, Hill Tipperah
- Died: 1880 (aged 78–79); Keltan Hmunpui
- Burial place: Keltan Hill
- Military career
- Allegiance: Lalsavunga
- Known for: Folk hero

Pasalṭha Zampuimanga was a Mizo warrior who served under Chief Lalsavunga. Zampuimanga also held a reputation as a tiger hunter.

== Early life ==
Zampuimanga was born in 1801 in Zampui village under Hill Tipperah. He was known as Manga by birth, however in the future to make him distinct from another individual named 'Manga' he was termed Zampuimanga as his village of origin. His father was Thanghuliana, a member of the Chhakchhuak Hualngo tribe. He moved with his father in 1820 to Hualngo, west of Aizawl. During his stay, his father died.

== Pasaltha ==
In 1825, Zampuimanga was recruited into Lalsavunga's settlement and became one of the 12 famous pasalthas under him. Zampuimanga aided Lalsavunga's northern expansion and consolidation of Sailo rule in the Lushai Hills. He assisted in establishing Aizawl, Darlawng, Lamtual (Saitual), Puilo, Vancheng, Awnnu, Tualte, Lungdup, and Champhai.

Other than being a warrior, Zampuimanga was also a tiger hunter. Zampuimanga was reputed to have killed 13 tigers with a sword alone, along with many more by rifle. In addition to his courage in facing tigers, Zampuimanga upheld the values of Tlawmgaihna and volunteering for his community. Zampuimanga's bravery in facing tigers is also recounted as stories. One account states that once, a wild tiger who had killed many villagers approached the village. Zampuimanga was said to have taken out of his spear and thumped it thrice on the ground leading the tiger to run away.

== Death ==
After the death of Chief Vanhnuailiana, Zampuimanaga moved to Chawngtleng, Dokhuma village with his sister Challiani. After that he moved to Bemterah, Dopawnga. Zampuimanga in his later life met with Pasalṭha Chawngbawla. In 1880, Zampuimanga died at Keltan Hmunpui in Dopawnga. His grave was established on Keltan Hill.

== Legacy ==
Zampuimanga was one of the named battalions under the Dagger Brigade in the Mizo National Front uprising.

== Sources ==
- Explore Mizoram (23 August 2023). "Pasalṭha Zampuimanga". Explore Mizoram.
- Goswami, B.B (1979). The Mizo Unrest: A Study of Politicisation of Culture. Jaipur: Aalekh Publishers.
- Hluna, Dr. J.V; Tochhawng, Rini (2012). The Mizo Uprising: Assam Assembly Debates on the Mizo Movement, 1966-1971. Newcastle, UK: Cambridge Scholars Publishing. ISBN 978-1-44384042-2.
- Sanajaoba, Naorem (1988). Manipur, Past and Present: Nagas & Kuki-Chins. Manipur: Mittal Publications.
- Zawla, K (1964). Mizo Pi Pute Leh An Thlahte Chanchin. Aizawl: Gosen Press.
