= Sports in Mizoram =

Sports in the Indian state of Mizoram

Sports in Mizoram include football, basketball and volleyball, among others.

== Mizo Traditional Games ==
- Insuknawr
- Inkawibah
- In-uilen
- Sakei lem chan
- Tira Mei Kaiah
- In-arpa sual
- In-hlovawm
- In-hmawlhtepir
- In-kukdeh
- In-hawngbi
- Inbuan
- In-saihrui pawh
- Bingte sai rawkah

== Football ==
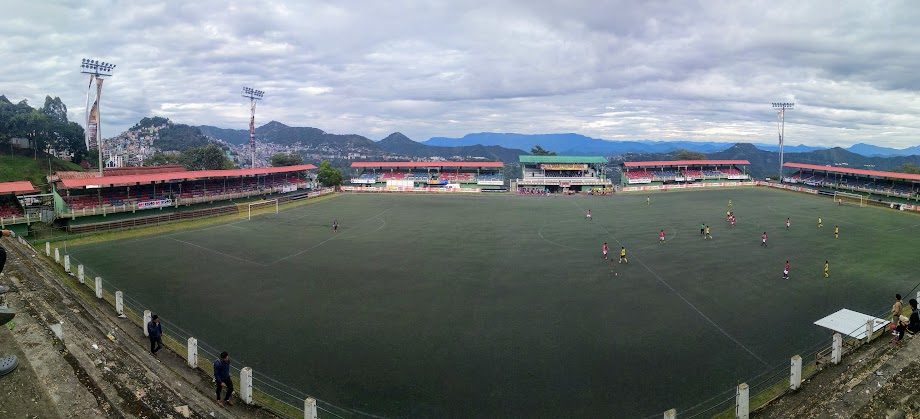
Lammual Stadium

Mizoram Football Association (MFA) is the state governing body of football in Mizoram, India. It is affiliated with the All India Football Federation, the sports national governing body. Mizoram also has a state League called Mizoram Premier League. Aizawl FC plays in the I-League.

== Basketball ==
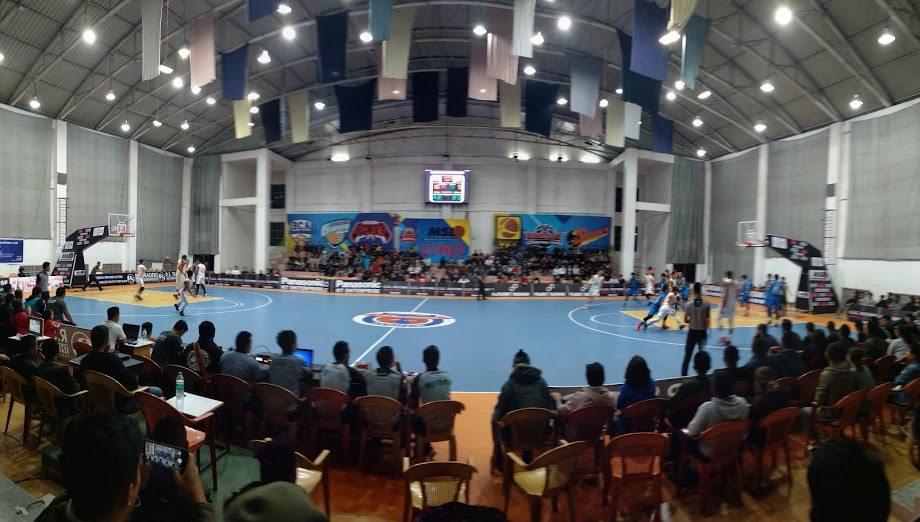
MSL game in Hawla Stadium

Mizoram has the first professional league in India, the Mizoram Super League with six teams in it. The competition is conducted by the Mizoram Basketball Association.

== Badminton ==
Mizoram has a professional league for Badminton called Mizoram Badminton League, Mizoram Badminton league is governed by Mizoram Badminton Association.

== Golf ==
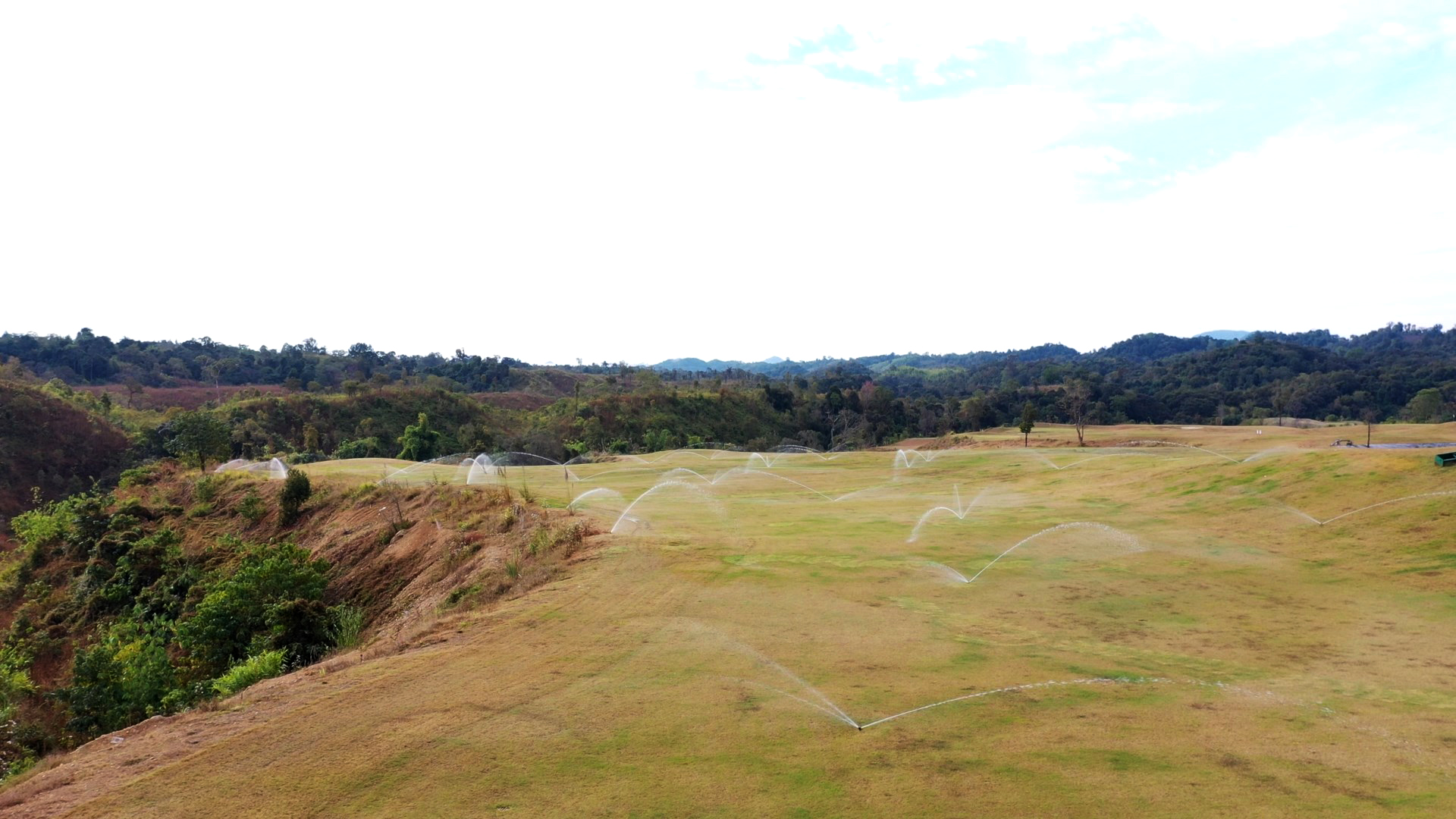
Thenzawl 18 hole golf course

Mizoram has a golf course at Thenzawl which is 105 acres and comprises 18 holes.

== Volleyball ==
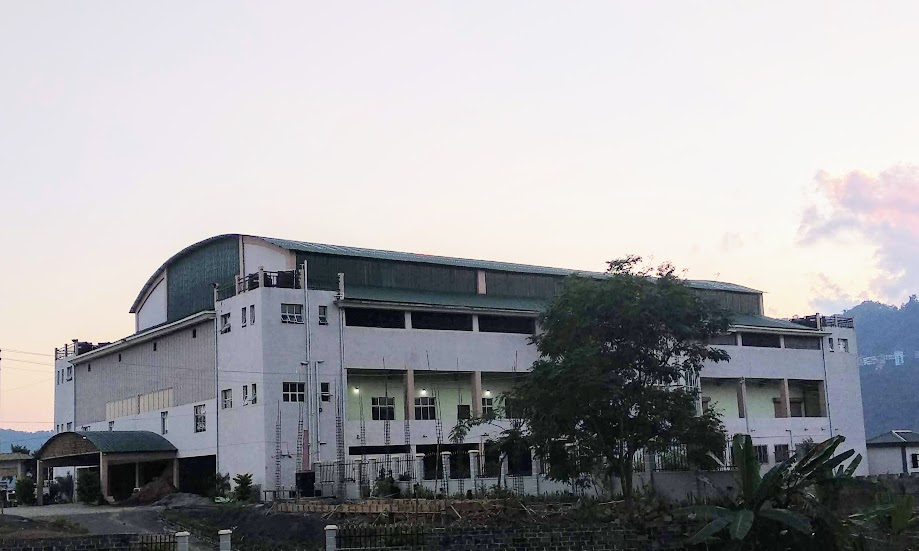
Dengthuama Indoor Stadium

The Mizoram Volleyball Association is operating the Pro-league which was started in 2016 with six men's team and three women's team.

== Motorsport ==
Mizoram Motorsport Association (MiMSA) 13 riders participated in the Suzuki Gixxer Cup and the JK Tyre National Racing Championship at the Kari Motor Speedway in Coimbatore. An annual racing competition is organized by Mizoram Motorsports Association in Tuirial Field annually towards the end of the year.

== Weightlifting ==
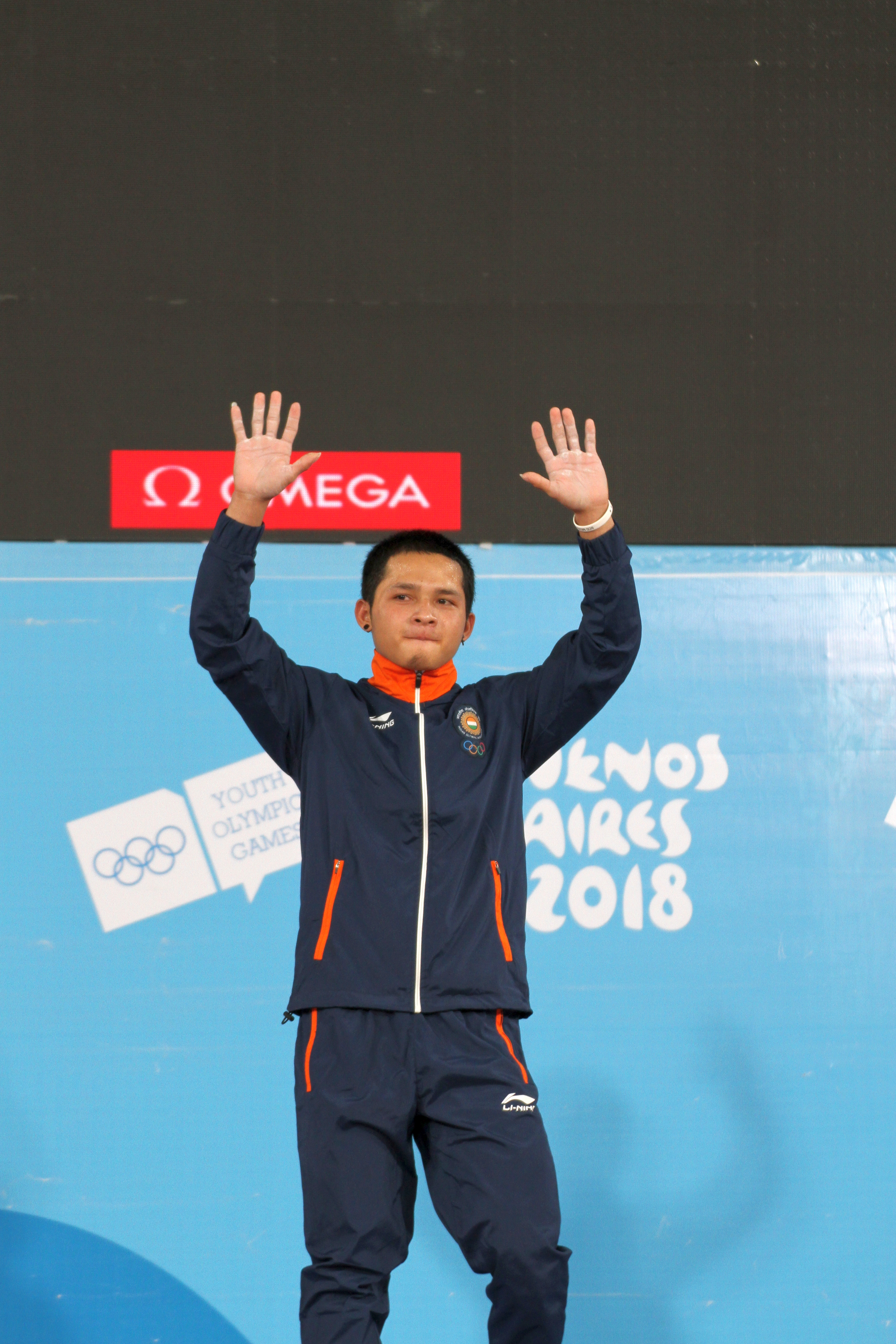
Jeremy Lalrinnunga at Youth Olympics Medail ceremony

The Mizoram Weightlifting Association plays a very active role in promoting weightlifting in Mizoram. Mizoram Weightlifter Jeremy Lalrinnunga became the first person from India to win a gold medal in the men's 62 kg categoryat the Youth Olympics.

== Cricket ==
The Cricket Association of Mizoram has a cricket stadium on the outskirts of Mizoram, called Suaka Cricket Stadium. The Association, which was formed in 1992, has eight first division clubs and 24 second division clubs.

The Mizoram team entered the national cricket competitions in the 2018-19 season.

== Boxing ==
Mizoram boxing association has a very good record in national and international boxing. Nutlai LalbiakkimaJenny R. L. and Zoramthanga (boxer), Lalrinsanga Tlau, who won the WBC World Youth Title in 2021, are some of the more famous boxers from Mizoram.

== Sports venues in Mizoram ==
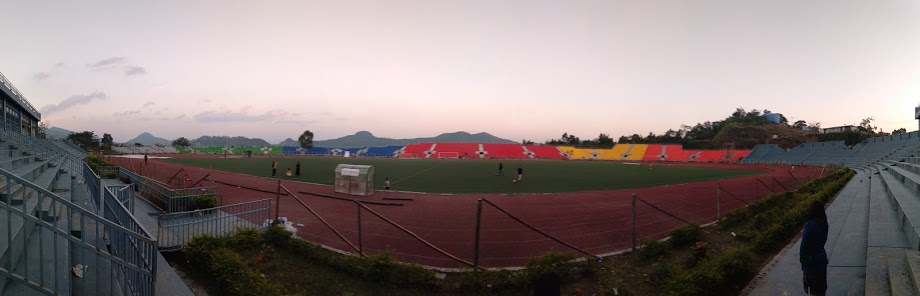
A panorama of Rajiv Gandhi Stadium, Aizawl

=== Indoor ===
- Hawla Indoor Stadium Basketball and Contact Sports
- Dengthuama Indoor Stadium Judo, Boxing, Volleyball, Badminton and Volleyball
- Sazaikawn multi-purpose indoor stadium, Lunglei.
- Mizoram Table Tennis Hall, Mission Veng
- Vanlallawma Indoor Stadium
- Boxing Hall, Ramhlun

=== Outdoor stadium ===
- Rajiv Gandhi Stadium (Aizawl) For Athletics and Football
- Lammual Football
- Thenzawl Golf Course
- Zobawk Sports Academy, Lunglei
- Thuamluaia Mual - artificial turf in Lunglei for Football
- Kawnpui Hockey ground - Artificial turf for Playing Hockey
- Champhai Zotlang Sports Stadium - Artificial Turf ground in Champhai for Athletics and Football
- Suaka Cricket Stadium- Sihhmui
- Kolasib Sports Stadium, Venglai - Athletics and Football with artificial turf.
- Serchhip Hmarveng Complex Field -Artificial turf football ground.
- Central YLA Playground, Lawngtlai - Artificial turf football ground.
