= Aizawl West 1 Assembly constituency =

Constituency of the Mizoram legislative assembly in India

Coordinates: 23.761°N 92.672°E

Aizawl West 1
- Constituency No. 15 for the Mizoram Legislative Assembly
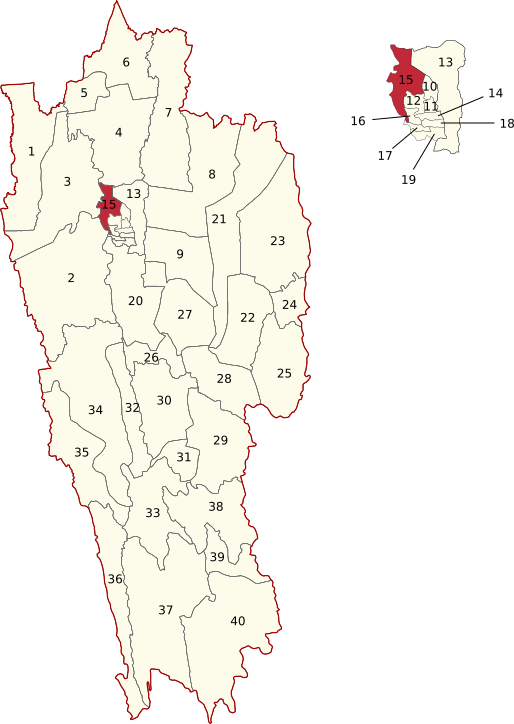

Constituency details
- Country: India
- Region: Northeast India
- State: Mizoram
- District: Aizawl
- Lok Sabha constituency: Mizoram
- Established: 1978
- Total electors: 20,804
- Reservation: ST

Member of Legislative Assembly
- 9th Mizoram Legislative Assembly
- Incumbent T. B. C. Lalvenchhunga
- Party: Zoram People's Movement
- Elected year: 2023

Aizawl West I is one of the 40 assembly constituencies of Mizoram, a northeastern state of India. This constituency falls under Mizoram Lok Sabha constituency.

It is part of Aizawl district and is reserved for candidates belonging to the Scheduled Tribes.

== Members of the Legislative Assembly ==
- 1978: Zairemthanga, Mizoram People's Conference
- 1979: Zairemthanga, Mizoram People's Conference
- 1984: K. Thansiami, Mizoram People's Conference
- 1989: J. Tahnghuama, Independent
- 1993: Lalkhana, Mizo National Front
- 1998: Col. Lalchungnunga Sailo, Mizoram People's Conference
- 2003: Aichhinga, Mizo National Front
- 2008: Lalduhawma, Zoram Nationalist Party
- 2013: K. Sangthuama, Mizo National Front
- 2018: Lalduhoma, Independent

Year	Member	Picture	Party
2019^	Zothantluanga		Mizo National Front
2023	T. B. C. Lalvenchhunga		Zoram People's Movement

^by-election

== Election results ==
=== 2023 ===
2023 Mizoram Legislative Assembly election: Aizawl West 1
Party	Candidate	Votes	%	±%
ZPM	T. B. C. Lalvenchhunga	11,872	49.68	
INC	H. Lalbiakthanga			
MNF	Zothantluanga	7,205	30.15	
AAP	Vanlalmawia Vanchhawng			
NOTA	None of the Above			
Majority				
Turnout				
		Swing		

=== 2018 ===
2018 Mizoram Legislative Assembly election: Aizawl West 1
Party	Candidate	Votes	%	±%
Independent	Lalduhoma	7,889		
MNF	K. Sangthuama	6829		
INC	P. C. Laltlansanga	5039		
BJP	Lalrodinga Colney	287		
Independent	Zaichhawana Hlawndo	228		
NCP	Lalhruaia	46		
NOTA	None of the Above	60		
Majority				
Turnout				
Independent gain from MNF		Swing		

== See also ==
- Mizoram Lok Sabha constituency
- Aizawl district
