= Laltheri =

Lushai princess and chieftainess

Lalchawngpuii Laltheri
- Chieftainess
- Predecessor: Lalsavunga
- Issue: Unknown son
- House: Sailo
- Father: Lalsavunga
- Religion: Sakhua

Lalchawngpuii also known as Laltheri was the daughter of Chief Lalsavunga. She is known as a poet and a figure of tragedy in Mizo history for her love story with Chalthanga, a commoner.

== Laltheri's Tragedy ==
Following the death of her father Lalsavunga, Laltheri lived in Saitual before moving to Ruallung. Laltheri was not permitted to marry commoners as the daughter of a chief. A daughter of a chief was used to seal alliances with other chiefs and their sons for political advantages instead. Laltheri was an intelligent and beautiful woman, according to Mizo accounts. She fell in love with Chalthanga. According to narratives about the event, Chalthanga was aware of the taboo of letting Laltheri pursue him. There was a risk of exile or punishment from the chief if he were to indulge in a relationship with her. The main issue was that Chalthanga was a commoner from a minor tribe. The relationship was publicly observable by the inhabitants. The couple practised nula rim (courtship), where he would carry firewood for her or assist her in her jhum. Chalthanga contributed to the village and attempted to become a Pasalṭha.

Chalthanga got Laltheri pregnant during their relationship. Fearing reprisal fromher family Chalthanga fled Ruallang. The men of Ruallang, under the orders of her brothers, pursued Chalthanga to Luangpawn. The men tricked Chalthanga by claiming that Laltheri was waiting for him with zu. Placing trust in the men Chalthanga turned his back where he was attacked with their axes. He was decapitated, and his head was brought and stuck on a pole in Ruallang. Laltheri shocked by the display cried a poem disdaining the Sailo rulers' cruelty for her love of Chalthanga. During her grievance before Chalthanga's head, she refused to wear clothes or eat as an act of defiance against her family and the chiefs. She often roamed the village grounds at night and rumours spread that she had gone insane among the Mizos. When her mother urged Laltheri to consume food, Laltheri refused. She sang another poem that she would not die for lack of food but of a broken heart. When her mother urged her to cover herself up by wearing clothes, Laltheri sang that she would not wear her clothes as her lover Chalthanga lies in the cold earth.

Laltheri gave birth to a son. When her son was able to walk, Laltheri was said to have begun putting a knife in his hand and teaching him to take revenge for his father. Fearing the revenge of her son in the future for the murder of his father, the killers left Ruallang. However, Laltheri's son would not survive past ten years of age. Years after grieving for Chalthanga and her son, Laltheri married a widower named Dingmaga in due time. He was a commoner but had the permission of the chief to marry. Lalsavunga bequeathed a village to Dingmanga and Laltheri to rule jointly. Laltheri was a successful ruler and poet of her time. Dingmanga would be killed in the east–west war after a western chief Hempua shot him during a raid. Laltheri fought valiantly to stop the raiders from taking Dingmanga's head.

As an outcome of Laltheri's protest, the Sailo chiefs held a meeting and passed a decree not to kill the lovers of their daughters. For this reason, Laltheri was accredited with social reform for Mizo women during her time.

== Poetry ==
During the time Laltheri dealt with her grief, she stopped waring clothes and eating food on the account that Chalthanga was also doing neither now in death. This leads to the first stanza:

Mizo:
Ka nemte puan ka châwi lo vang ka nu
Ka di thandang zâlna mah, chhimhlei tualdaihah
English:
Mother, I will not wear my clothes on,
Even my beloved lied in the grave

As a result of the defiance, Laltheri's mother encouraged her to consume food which Laltheri refused leading to the second stanza.

Mizo:
Chhunrawl lovin ka fam lo vang, ka nu,
Suihlunglengin Sailo ngurpui fam lo awk nâ e
English:
Mother, I will not die without having a mid-day meal,
Even for a daughter of a Sailo chief, it is easier to die with longing

The third stanza emerges when Laltheri berates her mother for hanging Chalthanga's head near their house.

Mizo:
Ka chun leh zua suihlung in mawl lua e,
Kan sum tualah Thangdang thunglu hawihten in tar e
English:
Mother, you are so stupid
You beheaded my beloved and hang up near our house

The final two stanzas occur when Laltheri attempts to open the grave of Chalthanga to verify.

Mizo:
Suihlung lenin piallei khar hawng ila,
A sakhmel leh a zungza tial engtin awm maw e.
A zungza ṭial engtin a awm lo ve,
A sakhmel snsiar khua fur tui ang a luang zo ta e.
English
Let us open his grave with utmost longing,
Will his body and fingers remain.
His body and fingers did no remain.
His handsome body have run away like running water.

== Sources ==
- Khiangte, Laltluangliana (2006). "The Discourse in oral society of the Mizos". In Muthukumaraswamy, M.D. (ed.). Folklore as Discourse. Chennai: National Folklore Support Centre. ISBN 978-81-901481-6-0.
- Lalbiakthanga (1978). The Mizos: A study in racial personality. Gauhati: united Publishers.
- Lalduhawmi, Lydia (2023). "Performing Madness: Laltheri's Narrative". In Pachuau, Margaret L. (ed.). Negotiating Culture: Writings from Mizoram. New Delhi: Bloomsbury Publishing India. ISBN 978-93-56400-19-1.
- Jacob, Malsawmi (2023). "Old Mizo Oral Literature". In Hmingthanzuali; Vanlalthanpuii, Mary (eds.). The Keepers of Knowledge:Writings from Mizoram. New Delhi: Zubaan. ISBN 978-93-90514-96-0.
- Nag, Sajal; Lalsangpuii, R. (2024). "Reversing of Gender: Anti-Colonial Resistance by Women Warriors in Northeast India". Gender in Modern India: History Culture, marginality. United Kingdom: Oxford University press. doi:10.1093/oso/9780198900788.001.0001. ISBN 978-0-19-890078-8.
- Lalrammuani, Enid. H. (2019). "Songs of Laltheri (Laltheri Zai) as reflection of liberation from social bondage in Mizo society". Historical Journal Mizoram. XX (1): 169–175.
