= Insuknawr =

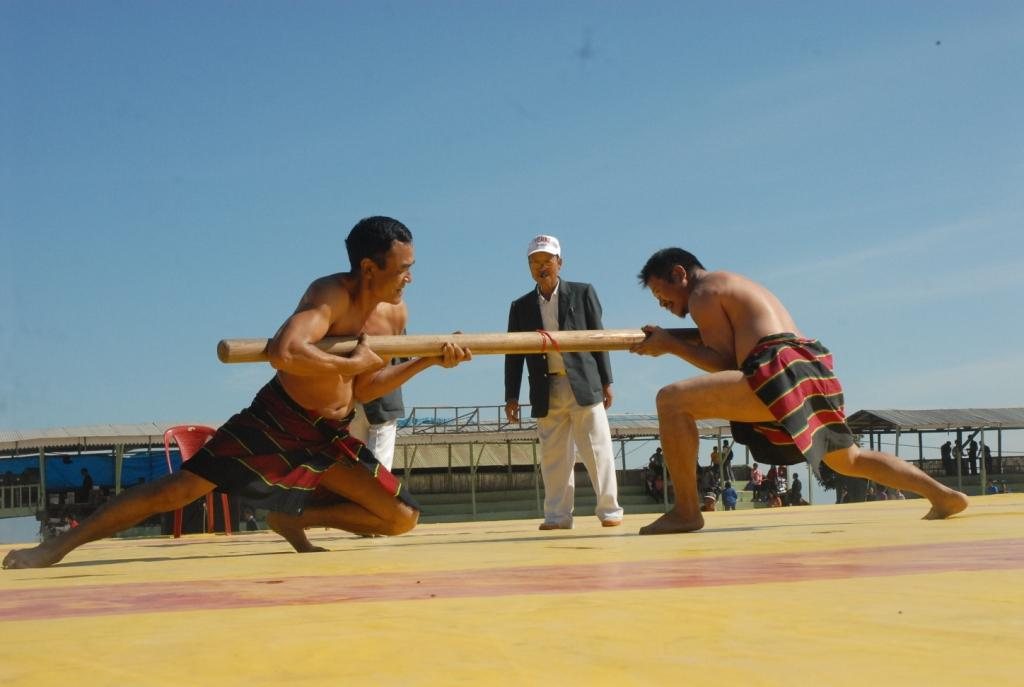
Insuknawr (Rod-Pushing Sport)

Insuknawr or Rod Pushing Sport is an indigenous game of Mizoram, a state in North-East India.

== Cultural background ==
Earlier, the Mizo community depended on shifting cultivation for livelihood and their main crop was rice. For husking rice the Mizos used wooden mortar and pestle which were called ‘Sum’ and ‘Suk’. During the break of their tiresome rice husking which was done mainly by women the Mizo youngsters used this rice pounding wooden pestle ‘Suk’ to exhibit their manly prowess. There were different games using Suk as instrument. are well known in addition to this rod pushing game. Sukkhawh is throwing Suk like a javelin, and Insukherh is a game in which two players holding Suk at each end and twisting with force to out play the opponent.

Of all these games, Insuknawr was the most popular among the Mizos. Zawlbuk, the center where young boys entering adulthood received informal education was the main place for this unique game. However, the formal education system which received widespread support throughout Mizoram in 1940s onwards brought about the decline of Zawlbuk and these indigenous games.

== Techniques ==
The game is played by two players, each player holding the rod under his arm, as in the game of tug of war. The end of the rod should protrude for at least two inches under the armpit, and the centre of the rod must align with the centre of the circle.

In this contest, each player tries to push his opponent out of the ring, through the back or the side of the circle. If a player falls to the ground, or he releases Suk, he is declared to be the loser. No player is to throw his opponent off balance by pulling the latter's rod. An expert player can skid or slide around within the circle, but the game or round is not won until a player is successfully pushed out. A round is considered as drawn if no player is pushed out of the circle. If all three rounds are drawn, a tie-breaker is declared, without any time limit, until a player is pushed out.

== Playing Area and Equipment ==
A circle of 16 ft diameter with a straight Line across the circle at the center is drawn. Suk or a round wooden rod or bamboo rod shall be approximately 8 ft long and 2.5 - 3 inches in diameter.
