= Tlâwmngaihna =

Moral code of the Mizos

Tlâwmngaihna is a moral code of the Mizo people, a Tibeto-Burman ethnic group primarily from the Indian state of Mizoram. It is a code of ethics that guides decisions and community participation in Mizo society.

== Etymology ==
Tlâwmngaihna does not have an equivalent english translation. Vanlalchhuanawma argues that altruism is the closest definition in English for Tlâwmngaihna but that this further fails to encompass the scope and brevity of the philosophy.

The earliest attempt at definition of the term was made by James Herbert Lorrain in Dictionary of the Lushai Language. Lorrain's definition listed seven terms:

1. To be self-sacrificing, unselfish, self-denying, preserving, stoical, brave, firm independent loathe the loss of reputation, prestige
2. To persevere, endure patiently, make light of personal injuries, dislike fussyness
3. To put one's own inclination to the side and do things they don't want to do
4. To do whatever the occasion demands no matter how distateful or inconvenient it is to oneself
5. To refuse to give in, give way or be conquered
6. To not like refusing requests, to do accomplish things by avoiding refusal of requests or people pleasing
7. To act pluckily or show a brave front

Sangliana in Lloyd's History of the Church in Mizoram defines Tlâwmngaihna as a code of morals and ethics which makes an individual Tlâwmngai. An individual cannot be Tlâwmngai unless they are courteous, considerate, helpful, unselfish, brave and ready to help others which can be summarised as "group over self".

== Philosophy ==
Tlâwmngaihna is argued to have originated not as a philosophy but as a descriptive term for certain traits in individuals. This is argued on the basis that the adjective Tlâwmngai is used to describe individuals embodying Tlâwmngaihna. The concept is summarised as placing the group over the self.

Christian scholars in Northeast India such as Downes, likened the philosophy of Tlâwmngaihna to the concept of chivalry. Vanlalchhuanawma argues this fulfils the practical aspect of Tlâwmngaihna but fails to address the concept aligning closer to altruism. In assessing the definition of chivalry, Tlâwmngaihna did encourage a code of honor, self-sacrifice and bravery.

== Origin ==
Tlâwmngaihna has been argued as a doctrine developed over time with dynamic interaction of relationships and forces in the community-based society of the Mizos.

== Culture ==
=== Pre-colonial era ===
In the absence of postal and telegraph systems the chiefdoms maintained a zualko system where a messenger was sent through the forest routes to communicate news of sickness, death of villagers to families separated from them. To traverse a forest alone was considered dangerous from wild animals, ramhuai (transl. demons) and difficult terrain or climate. This errand was known as Zualkoa tlan as the urgency of the message required hasty travelling. A volunteer of the men in the zawlbûk would nominate themselves first and thus be considered the most Tlâwmngai.

The same principle was exemplified in funerals. Young men would be made to dig, and the spirit of Tlâwmngaihna encouraged them to surpass others in productivity. This led to neighbouring non-Mizos describing the people as "being fond of digging graves". Similarly, for injured or sick individuals, a locally-made stretcher would be made, which young men (Tlâwmngai tlangvals would carry the individual on the stretcher on their shoulders. Every time the group entered a new village, the men of the village would carry the sickly individual to the next village and take over the responsibility to carry. However, this would sometimes lead to conflict known as mi zawn inchuh in which parties would compete to carry the individual in the spirit of Tlâwmngaihna.

In hunting, all party members would excel at doing the best of the responsibilities in fetching water, cooking and conserving food portions. If a party member was caught by a wild animal, the code of Tlâwmngaihna would require everyone to assist him regardless of risking death. Outside of hunting, festival would see assistance in the cooking of rice and Zû (beverage). Tlâwmngaihna was not limited but also extended to guests and strangers by gifting supplies and hospitality.

=== Christianity era ===
Tlâwmngaihna which was exemplified by Mizo folk heroes such as Vana Pa and Taitesena became replaced with Christian figures such as St Paul and Jesus Christ.

== Sources ==
- Lalnuntluangi (2023). "Theologizing Tlawmngaihna in Mizo Culture for National Integrity" (PDF). Heritage Research Journal. 71 (8).
- Lloyd, J. Meirion (1991). History of the Church in Mizoram: Harvest in the Hills. Synod Publication Board. pp. 17–23.
- Lorrain, James Herbert (1940). Dictionary of Lushai Language. Asiatic Society.
- Vanlalchhuanawma (2007). Christianity and Subaltern Cuture: Revival Movement as a Cultural Response to Westernisation in Mizoram. Delhi: Indian Society for Promoting Christian Knowledge. ISBN 978-81-7214-901-7.
