= Ropuiliani =

Mizo Chieftainess (1828–1895)

- Chieftainess of Denlung "Denlung Lalnu
- Reign: 1889–8 August 1893
- Predecessor: Vandula
- Born: 1828; Aizawl
- Died: 3 January 1895 (aged 66–67); Rangamati, British Raj
- Burial: Denlung Mizoram, Hnahthial District
- Issue: Lalsavuta, Lalropuii, Hrangphunga, Sangliana, Thanhula, Darpuiliani, Lalṭhuama, Dotawna
- Father: Lalsavunga

Ropuiliani (1828–3 January 1895) was a Mizo chieftainess in south Mizoram (Lushai Hills) in the nineteenth century. She is remembered for her resistance against British colonial forces after the death of her husband, Vandula. She was the chieftainess for Denlung and eight other villages, near present-day Lunglei in Mizoram. She died in confinement at a prison in Rangmati, Bangladesh on 3 January 1895.

== Reign ==
Ropuiliani was the daughter of Lalsavunga, the chief of Aizawl, and was born and raised in present-day Mizoram Governor Compound, Mizoram. In 1847 she was married to Vandula, the chief of Denlung. When her eldest son Dotawna died, leaving only minor heirs, Ropuiliani stepped into the role of regent and chieftainess. She upheld her late husband's policies of non-cooperation and resistance to British colonial authority, refusing to engage in negotiations or comply with British demands. Taxes, labor levies, and rice tributes were all withheld under her leadership, signaling her defiance against colonial encroachment.

=== Resistance ===
The British settlement at Lungleh marked a turning point in her resistance efforts. Viewing it as a threat to her community's autonomy, Ropuiliani galvanized her allies Zakapa and Dokapa, urging them to take a stand against the colonial presence. Her leadership and strategic instigation of allied chiefs highlighted her resolve to resist British dominance and maintain the sovereignty of her people. Ropuiliani's actions during this period cemented her legacy as a fierce and principled leader who refused to yield to colonial pressure.

Ropuiliani's resistance against British rule reached a critical point with the killing of H.R. Browne. She and her son Lalṭhuama refused to attend the Chief's Durbars in 1890, boycotting all three sessions. British efforts to persuade her, including sending her brothers Seipuia and Lalluava to negotiate, failed. The situation escalated when the British sent an interpreter known as a Rashi, which enraged Ropuiliani, leading to the interpreter's execution by a pasalṭha named Hnawncheuva.

== Arrest ==
The British decided to raid Ropuiliani's village upon hearing of the execution. The raid was organized under Captain John Shakespeare and R.H.S Hutchinson and Pugh. It was discovered that Ropuiliani, Lalṭhuama, and a northern chief, Doakoma, planned an uprising against the British. An ultimatum was given to pay a fine of several guns, pigs, fowls and rice.

After some resistance, the British captured Ropuiliani and her son Lalṭhuama, which left the settlement leaderless. Ropuiliani was carried in a palanquin claiming she was unable to walk with her captors. In jail she was offered the opportunity for peace and freedom if she submitted to British rule which was rejected once again. Ropuiliani and her son were eventually moved to a prison in Rangamati out of fear of her influence.

== Death ==
Ropuiliani's old age and health was reasons of concern to free her from jail. Before she could be released, she died in confinement due to diarrhea on 3 January 1895. Her death ultimately decentralized coordinated efforts to resist British takeover of the Lushai Hills. Guns amounting up to 100 in Ropuiliani's village and 500 in allies settlements were seized subsequently.

Lalṭhuama was released and allowed to assist his mother's dead body. Ropuiliani was laid to rest in Denlung, as she prefer to laid with her husband Vandula .

Historical and Archaeological Evidence for the Burial Site of Chieftainess Ropuiliani

There is an ongoing historical debate concerning the burial location of Chieftainess Ropuiliani. Strong evidence suggests she was interred at Denlung, in accordance with her wish to be buried alongside her husband. Her descendants have consistently affirmed the location of her burial at Denlung.

Key supporting evidence includes: A 1924 response to an inquiry by Superintendent of South Lushai District Sairuma, son of Lalțhuama, explicitly identified Denlung as her burial place.

The excavation of the Denlung grave site yielded artifacts consistent with historical records, specifically a ceramic cup and a charge sheet book, as documented in T.H. Lewin's diary entries from 1896.

Conversely, the grave site excavated at Ralvawng is maintained by Thanhulha's descendants to be the burial location of Thanhulha and his wife, Ropuiliani's son and daughter-in-law, respectively. This further supports the claim that Ropuiliani herself was buried at Denlung.

=== Aftermath ===
After Ropuiliani's death, the little resistance led to the murder of many Mizo chiefs by the British. Not only her chiefdom's nine villages, but the whole of Lushai Hills came under the control of the British by 1895 and was formally declared as part of British India.

== In popular culture ==
The inclusion of Ropuiliani's portrait at the Red Fort sparked mixed reactions, with TBC Lalvenchhunga celebrating it as a symbol of her valour against British colonialism, while critics like theologian Rca Jongte and concerned citizen F Lalramhluni argued that portraying her as an Indian freedom fighter misrepresents her resistance, which was to protect Mizo sovereignty, not India's independence. This criticism aligns with broader concerns over cultural assimilation by the RSS, as similar resistance emerged in Manipur where depictions of war hero Paona Brajabasi as an Indian freedom fighter led to protests and bans, and earlier opposition from Mizo student bodies to the classification of figures like Khuangchera as Indian freedom fighters, emphasizing that these warriors fought for their territories long before the concept of Indian independence existed.
