= Lalsavunga =

Early Lushai chief (c.1750-c.1820

- Chief of Aizawl; Aizawl Lal
- Predecessor: Lalpuiliana
- Successor: Vanhnuailiana
- Regent: Lallula
- Issue: Vanhnuailiana; Lalphunga hawmvunga Lalchawngpuii; Thangpuii; Chawngpuituali
- House: Sailo
- Father: Lalpuiliana
- Mother: Khuangtiali (Pawi)
- Religion: Sakhua

Lalsavunga (English: Lalsavoonga; c. 1755-c. 1840) was an early Mizo chief. He was the grandson of Chief Lallula and father of Vanhnuailiana. He helped consolidate Sailo dominance in the Lushai Hills as chief and is credited with founding the original site of what is now Aizawl.

== Early life ==
Lalsavunga was born to Lalpuiliana and Khuangtiali. Since Lalpuiliana was sickly and unhealthy since a young age, Lallula arranged for a wife. A brave Pawi girl known as Khuangtiali who had a reputation for living alone was married to him. He had a sister named Vanhnuaithangi. Lalsavunga was approximately born after the Thlanrawn massacre which was circa 1750.

== Chieftainship ==
Lalsavunga's grandfather, Lallula assigned him chief of Zawngtah village in 1782. Lalpuiliana had passed when Lalsavunga was very young and hence he was taken under the care of Lallula. Lalsavunga, his sister Vanhnuaithangi and his mother Khuangtiali would reside at Zawngtah upon him becoming chief. In 1790, Lalsavunga would move to Phulpui and then Kelsih. However, early into chieftainship at Kelsih, the Hualngos would attack and loot his village. In revenge Lalsavunga drove away the Hualngos encamped at Hualngohmun. After Kelsih, Lalsavunga shifted to South Hlimen circa 1805. Around this period his grandfather Chief Lallula died at Hreichuk. To better fend his people, Lalsavunga encouraged his men to procure firearms. A policy was introduced to give the first choice of jhum plots to men with firearms, hence incentivising gun ownership and prestige of his chiefdom. As result of this, a location near Hlimen was named Silai Muakl (mount of the guns).

After Hlimen, Lalsavunga would build the village of Aizawl, which later became a British outpost and the capital of Mizoram. The estimated time for establishing Aizawl village under Lalsavunga is around 1810. During his rule at Aizawl, Lalsavunga began to subjugate the Zadeng chiefs. At this point, Lallula and his sons occupied the country between Champhai and Demagiri up to Cachar and Bengal. Due to the Mizo custom of free migration between chiefs, Lalsavunga's prestige attracted many villagers to his chiefdom. His chiefdom grew and thus made him one of the most powerful chiefs of his time.

When Vuta was captured by the Pawi chiefs in 1806 and held at Falam, Lalsavunga began to raise a ransom for his uncle's release. The chiefs complied and pooled their wealth, however, the Zadeng chiefs such as Lalchungnunga did not. Due to this Vuta was unable to be released from captivity. Lalsavunga, in vengeance, held Ngurapuilala, the son of Lalchungnunga, hostage. Ngurpuilal had been captured during a joint attack with his uncle Mângpawrha. While Vuta requested him to release Ngurapuilala, Lalsavunga attempted to extort and disgrace the Zadeng chiefs. Lalsavunga took the weapons and bawis of the Zadeng chiefs. The Zadeng bawis respected Lalsavunga as their treatment in the Zadengs saw them being refused to drink water in any household. The bawis were allowed to escape, and those who could not were released. Lalchungnunga and his people provided their property in order to ransom Ngura which contributed to a significant decline in the power of the Zadeng chiefs. Lalchungnunga was forced to migrate from Darlawingh to Khawlring in Tripura at the time. After subduing the remaining chiefs into his sphere of influence, Lalsavunga turned his attention east.

Lalsavunga intended to raid the Pawis of Falam for their conduct towards Lallula and his family. His sister, Vanhnuaithangi, who was married to Tinawna Khiangte, was ordered to establish a village south of Lungpher. This would become a launching pad for his invasion against the Pawi. However this would not take place due to a war with the Pawis. Lalsavunga's pasaltha, Vana Pa would be responsible for pursuing the Hmars and fight against Manipur in 1910. Lalsavunga left his younger son, Lalphunga, and his mother, Khuantuali, at Kelsih. Vuta joined Lalsavunga in getting revenge on the Pawis. He used his intelligence of the inroads of the Chin Hills based on his experiences as a captive to guide Lalsavunga's men. Lalsavunga migrated his villagers and built a new settlement of Darlawng around 1818. At this point in his rule as chief, Lalsavunga was considered to be at the peak of his power.

=== Famous Pasalṭha ===
Lalsavunga would boast multiple Pasalṭha of great fame in his settlements. These warriors would be inherited by Vanhnuailiana at his village in Tualte after Lalsavunga's death. Lalsavunga's most trusted advisor and warrior was Vana Pa (Thangzachhinga). Vana Pa was known for pursuing the Hmars into the territories of Manipur and capturing weapons from their settlements.

The most famous Pasalṭha are as follows:

- Vana Pa (Chawngthu)
- Chawngduma (Tlau)
- Tawktiala (Hmar)
- Zampuimanga (Ralte)
- Darphawka (Kawlni)
- Chhunkeuva (Khiangte)
- Zabiaka (Fanai)
- Darbuta (Chhakchhuak)
- Dokuala (Tlau)
- Chalkhenga (Fanai)
- Darkuala (Kawlni)
- Darruma (Khawlhring)
- Doruma (Vangchhia)
- Keikawla (Khiangte)

== Later life ==
Lalsavunga's daughter Lalchawngpuii also known as Laltheri shifted to Ruallang. At Ruallang she fell in love with Chalthianga a commoner and became pregnant. Out of fear of Lalsavunga and his sons, Chalthanga ran away from the village. He was followed and overtaken by the village men who caught up to him at Lungpher. Chalthanga was killed by them in the pursuit. While Lalsavunga and his sons were concerned with the scandal their intention was not to kill but rather let him migrate to another village. Lalthawngpuii was married to a widower named Dingmanga. Lalsavunga bequeathed Dinmanaga and Lalchawngpuii, a village they would rule jointly until the east-west war.

Lalsavunga's death is argued to have occurred at either Saitual or Darlawng. His death date is argued to be around 1820 or 1840. He was succeeded by his son Vanhnuailiana who would wage wars against the Pawi and Suktes.

== Legacy ==
Lalsavunga Park was opened on 3 October 2018 and named after him.

== Genealogy ==
Eastern Lushai Chiefs Family Tree

Lallula
Mângpawrha	Lallianvunga	Lalpuiliana	Vûta	Neipuithangi
Suakpuilala	Ngûra	Lalphunga	Thâwmvunga	Lalsavunga
Vanpuilala	Pâwibâwia	Lalruma	Chenglena	Vanhnuailiana	Laltheri
Lalhleia	Doțhiauva	Liankhama	Ropuiliani	Lalburha	Buangtheuva
Thangkâma	Vanphunga	Lalruaia	Lalthuama
Langthanglula	Sanglura	Lalvunga	Lungliana	Kairûma	Lalkhûma

== Sources ==
- Zawla, K. (1964). Mizo Pi Pute leh an thlahte Chanchin. Aizawl: Gosen Press.
- Verghese, C.G.; Thanzawna, R.L. (1997). A History of the Mizos. New Delhi: Vikas Publishing House.
