= Vana Pa =

Mizo pasaltha and counsellor

Pasalṭha Vana Pa Chawngthu
- Born: Thangzachhinga c. 1800s
- Died: 1871 (disputed); 1891 (disputed); Zawlnghak (disputed); Tuithoh Kamah
- Military career
- Allegiance: Lalsavunga; Vanhnuailiana

Pasalṭha Vana Pa born Thanzachhinga was a famed Mizo tactician and counsellor under Chief Lalsavunga and his son Vanhnuailiana.

== Pasalṭha ==
Vana Pa had a reputation for having a bad temper. For this reason, he was not married until he was around forty years old. After the birth of his son Vana, he would be referred to as Vana Pa (Father of Vana). Vana Pa was not successful at manual labour but was considered an expert in basket weaving and handicrafts, which was his primary occupation.

After realizing his temper was holding him back, Vana Pa reformed himself to the village's surprise. He was relentlessly tested on his reformation by being teased, having his work spoilt or breaking his necklace. However, Vana Pa succeeded in managing his temper and became a sporting villager in his community. He lived in Lalsavunga's village of Hlimen. Lalsavunga's policy of offering the right to select jhum plots via the purchasing of guns encouraged Vana Pa to sell his handicrafts and purchase a musket for himself. Vana Pa was unique as a pasaltha for not committing any great acts but forming a reputation as being a tactful, skilled and wise counsellor. His resourcefulness in battle was highly effective among his contemporaries. Despite earning the right of priority selection of the jhum plots, the system was unfair to the widows and the poor who would have little choice but to take the wild plots with poor harvests. Vana Pa as a result willingly took the worst plots to allow the poor and vulnerable to have better harvests.

Vana Pa also became reputed for his honor code of Tlâwmngaihna. During hunting expeditions, Vanapa would preserve his camp with supplies for other hunters who might be in need of supplies. One incident recalls how Vana Pa and his party ran out of food and found some wild root. Vana Pa refused to eat any until the rest of the men had their fill. Another hunting expedition oversaw Vana Pa nearly lose his temper as a fat bison was scared by a young village hunter. However, Vana Pa collected himself and congratulated the party for each providing one game each for the village.

Under Vanhnuailiana, Vana Pa was considered a wise counsellor. In reward, Vanhnuailiana offered reward to Vana Pa by allowing him to become chief of a village. However Vana Pa refused instead preferring his son to be allowed to become a counsellor. Vana Pa was most closely associated with the Pasalṭha Chawngduma. As a tactician Vana Pa was instrumental in the overthrowing of the Hmars and the repelling of attacks of the Thlanrawn from Burma.

== Death ==
Two dates are offered for Vana Pa's death. The earlier date discusses 1871 where Vana Pa in ill health died after exposure to heavy rainfall while travelling the mountain side during his stay in Khuanglam. He was buried in Zawlnghak (Rabung) village. The grave was excavated in 1992 without concrete evidence to support the claim. Another offered date for Vana Pa's death is 1891 in Zawlnghak.

Vana Pa was succeeded by three sons, Vana, Lanchungnunga and Ralduha.

== Legacy ==
Vana Pa was one of the named battalions of the Mizo National Front uprising that formed the dagger brigade.

== Sources ==
- Lalbiakthanga (1978). The Mizos: A Study in Racial Personality. Guahati: United Publishers.
- Hlima, L.T. "Pasaltha Vanapa". Sakeibaknei.
- Goswami, B.B (1979). The Mizo Unrest: A Study of Politicisation of Culture. Jaipur: Aalekh Publishers.
