= Tualte =

- village
- Location in Mizoram, India Tualte (India)
- Coordinates: 23.4128402°N 93.2074712°E
- Country: India
- State: Mizoram
- District: Champhai
- Block: Khawzawl
- Elevation: 1,379 m (4,524 ft)

Population (2011)
  - Total: 1,177
- Time zone: UTC+5:30 (IST)
- 2011 census code: 271329

Tualte is a village in the Champhai district of Mizoram, India. It is located in the Khawzawl R.D. Block.

== Demographics ==
According to the 2011 census of India, Tualte has 207 households. The effective literacy rate (i.e. the literacy rate of population excluding children aged 6 and below) is 97.62%.

Demographics (2011 Census)
	Total	Male	Female
Population	1177	594	583
Children aged below 6 years	169	82	87
Scheduled caste	0	0	0
Scheduled tribe	1165	585	580
Literates	984	502	482
Workers (all)	614	323	291
Main workers (total)	606	320	286
Main workers: Cultivators	426	238	188
Main workers: Agricultural labourers	114	42	72
Main workers: Household industry workers	1	1	0
Main workers: Other	65	39	26
Marginal workers (total)	8	3	5
Marginal workers: Cultivators	2	1	1
Marginal workers: Agricultural labourers	4	1	3
Marginal workers: Household industry workers	0	0	0
Marginal workers: Others	2	1	1
Non-workers	563	271	292
