= Chawngbawla =

Mizo Pasalṭha

Pasalṭha Chawngbawla Chhakchhuak
- Born: Seipuia's village
- Children: Saizema; Vawmthanga
- Military career
- Allegiance: Southern Sailo Chiefs
- Known for: Folk hero
- Conflicts: North-South War

Pasalṭha Chawngbawla was a Mizo warrior who participated in the North-South War of the Lushai Hills.

== Early life ==
Chawngbawla was born to a Chhakchhuak family in Seipuia's village. He was born of a under-average stature leading to many underestimating his strength. Chawngbawla performed many feats of strength in his youth. He was reputed to be a man of few words who would understate his pain and wounds. Chawngbawla was also perceived as humble with the exception of boasting of being undefeated by other challengers. His name became reputed among both the eastern and western Mizo tribes. Children began a tradition of stating a saying: Ka kawi Chawngbawla a tlan ngai lo. This phrase was used during the playing of games to swear on Chawngbawla's name to a wild fruit known as kawi.

== Pasaltha ==
During the North-South War of the Lushai Hills, Chawngbawla participated in a raid of the Sialhmur village. Upon hearing of Chawngbawla being in the party, the village evacuated its inhabitants, and thus, Chawngbawla was forced to return without any human heads or scalps as trophies. During the return journey home, the raiding party stumbled upon a fruit orchard and began to harvest it. The owner of the orchard fired upon the men in retaliation. In response, Chawngbawla diverted attention to himself at risk to his life to let his allies escape unharmed. As a result, the orchard owner was disarmed. Chawngbawla allowed the owner to return home unscathed after he appealed for his life. However, the orchard owner retold the events upon reaching home. This led to the village hero, Chawngzika Chawngthu (Nghatebaka), becoming enraged and forming a war party to confront Chawngbawla. Chawngzika was a Pasalṭha on par with the fame of Chawngbawla at the time. Chawngzika chased Chawngbawla and his party. Chawngbawla consequentially hid away as Ngahatebaka chased his men, who exclaimed low morale to lure the attackers. After running enough distance, Chawngbawla ambushed and shot Chawngzika to death.

During Chawngbawla's stay at the zawlbuk, there was discussion whether Chawngbawla could fight a wounded boar. This was due to the traditional belief that a wounded boar were the most desperate fighting animal which made for legendary duels. Chawngbawla was tested on this when a young hog was ensared in a trap and escaped and thus led the villagers to avoid going to their jhums. Chawngbawla brought a boy with him to bait the boar to attack him so that he may intervene. When the boar charged at the boy, Chawngbawla was said to have drawn his dao and had broken the jaw and cut off the neck of the hog.

In other incidents, Chawngbawla captured a baby elephant from its herd and a wild bear. Due to these feats, his eldest son was named Saizema and his niece was named Sailingi (one who roped an elephant). His other son was named Vawmthanga meaning famous as reference to when he caught a wild bear alive.

== Legacy ==
Chawngbawla died a normal death of old age in his home despite wishing to have always died with honor by an enemy or animal. His name is also used as the name of a citrus fruit which is a cross between lemon and orange.

Chawngbawla was one of the named battalions part of the lion brigade in the Mizo National Front uprising.

== Sources ==
- Hluna, Dr. J.V; Tochhawng, Rini (2012). The Mizo Uprising: Assam Assembly Debates on the Mizo Movement, 1966-1971. Newcastle, UK: Cambridge Scholars Publishing. ISBN 978-1-44384042-2.
- Lalbiakthanga (1978). The Mizos: A Study in Racial Personality. Guahati: United Publishers.
- Lalthangliana, B. (2005). Culture and Folklore of Mizoram. Aizawl: Publications Division Ministry of Information and Broadcasting. ISBN 978-81-230-2658-9.
- Zawla, K (1964). Mizo Pi Pute Leh An Thlahte Chanchin. Aizawl: Gosen Press.
