= Zothantluanga =

Indian politician

Member of Mizoram Legislative Assembly
- In office 2019–2023
- Preceded by: Lalduhoma
- Constituency: Aizawl West I

Personal details
- Born: Zothantluanga
- Party: Mizo National Front
- Education: M.A from North Eastern Hill University

Zothantluanga is an Indian politician. He was elected to the Mizoram Legislative Assembly from Aizawl West I in the 2019 by-election as a member of the Mizo National Front.
