= Buang =

- village
- Location in Mizoram, India Buang (India)
- Coordinates: 23.3494655°N 93.2527054°E
- Country: India
- State: Mizoram
- District: Champhai
- Block: Khawbung
- Elevation: 1,312 m (4,304 ft)

Population (2011)
  - Total: 480
- Time zone: UTC+5:30 (IST)
- 2011 census code: 271350

Buang is a village in the Champhai district of Mizoram, India. It is located in the Khawbung R.D. Block.

== Demographics ==
According to the 2011 census of India, Buang has 88 households. The effective literacy rate (i.e. the literacy rate of population excluding children aged 6 and below) is 96.96%.

Demographics (2011 Census)
	Total	Male	Female
Population	480	254	226
Children aged below 6 years	85	39	46
Scheduled caste	0	0	0
Scheduled tribe	480	254	226
Literates	383	210	173
Workers (all)	205	133	72
Main workers (total)	199	130	69
Main workers: Cultivators	193	128	65
Main workers: Agricultural labourers	0	0	0
Main workers: Household industry workers	0	0	0
Main workers: Other	6	2	4
Marginal workers (total)	6	3	3
Marginal workers: Cultivators	1	0	1
Marginal workers: Agricultural labourers	1	1	0
Marginal workers: Household industry workers	3	2	1
Marginal workers: Others	1	0	1
Non-workers	275	121	154
