= Khuangchera =

Mizo Warrior and Resistance figure (c. 1850-1890)

Pasalṭha Khuangchera Ralte
- Born: c. 1850; Parvatui, Chieftainship of Lianphunga (in present-day West Phaileng block of Mamit district)
- Died: 26–28 September 1890 (aged 39-40); Changsil Fort
- Cause of death: Gunshot
- Burial place: Ailawng, Reiek
- Relatives: Thangṭhiauva (Father); Thangluaii (Mother); Ngurbawnga (friend)
- Military career
- Allegiance: Lianphunga; Sailianpuia
- Known for: Folk Hero of the Lushais (Declared) Indian Freedom Fighter
- Conflicts: Lushai Rising

Pasalṭha Khuangchera was a distinguished Mizo warrior renowned for his valor and leadership during the late 19th century. He is celebrated for his resistance against British colonial forces in the Lushai Hills, present-day Mizoram, India.

== Early life ==
Khuangchera, born to Thangṭhiauva and Thangluaii, was the youngest of three brothers and was of the Ralte Kawlni Kawltung tribe. The original village of Khuangchera not known but he was recorded to be living in Chipui, Pawvatui, Kanghmun etc. They lived in Parvatui, under the chieftainship of Lianphunga, the son of Suakpuilala, who is a descendant of Mângpawrha. The eldest brother of Khuangchera was Kawla, and the second eldest was Chawnghanga, a blacksmith in Reiek under the rule of Sailianpuia. The three brothers were reputed for their bravery but Khuangchera became the most reputable. Lianphunga, the chief of Parvatui, was the brother of Sailianpuia and they were the most prominent chiefs in the west.

When he was younger, they lived in Chhippui. Since childhood, he has been the centre of attention in the community. Suakchhunga, the local pasalṭha, shot and wounded a wild bear. Khuangchera accompanied the village heroes to investigate the injured animal the next day. The bear was dragged to a cave. The guys with their rifles stood at the cave's entrance, and no one dared to go in or out. Khuangchera is recorded to have hit the bear with the dao. Further stories record Khuangchera as killing tigers with spears only. For reasons unknown, Khuangchera soon left Lianphunga to live at Sailianpui's village of Reiek.

In Ailawng near Reiek, the villagers who used to rely on a natural water spring were afraid to enter the narrow cave due to superstition. There was a debate whether or not the cave connected to a cave on the other side of the hill where no water was observed. Khuangchera formed a torch of bamboo and explored the cave and came out the other end to prove the trail. However, Khuangchera fell sick with a serious illness a few days after. The cave remained unexplored for the next eighty years but was named after Khuangchera.

== British resistance ==
The British colonial administration's encroachment into the Lushai Hills during the late 19th century marked a period of heightened resistance among the Mizos. Khuangchera actively participated in efforts to thwart British advances, particularly during the Chin-Lushai military expedition of 1889-90. His expertise in guerrilla tactics and his familiarity with the rugged terrain enabled the Lushai warriors to disrupt British supply lines and communication networks, significantly slowing their progress. Khuangchera’s leadership was instrumental in uniting the Pasalthas and other local leaders against a common enemy.

Despite his strategic acumen, Khuangchera’s commitment to traditional customs occasionally created tension with his peers. For instance, his observance of Naulaihrilh, a cultural practice for parents during the post-childbirth period of rest, initially kept him from participating in the British expedition. However, his subsequent involvement in the defense of Changsil underscored his unwavering dedication to his people’s cause. His ability to balance cultural responsibilities with military obligations made him a respected figure on and off the battlefield.

Reinforcements arrived from the Tlawng river under A.C. Tytler and Lieutenant R.R. Swinton. A majority of the Lushais retreated however Lieutenant R.R. Swinton was killed while leading the reinforcements. The chief was annoyed by Khuangchera's absence of the sieges and thus Khuangchera assigned himself to Changsil Fort. He left with his friend Ngurbawnga with crude flint guns.

== Death ==
Khuangchera fought bravely against the British during Lushai Rising and the besiegment of Changsil Fort. Khuangchera's war party however ran out of ammunition as they underestimated the British ammunition stocks. While fighting the British, his friend Ngurbawng was injured after being shot by a British soldier. Ngurbawnga was shot in the leg. Khuangchera according to the Pasalatha code picked up Ngurbawnga to carry him. Khuangchera's attempt to carry Ngubawng on his shoulder to take him back to the village led to a British soldier shooting him in the back. However Khuangchera was simply wounded. While on the ground a soldier approached him. Khuangchera took out his dao and speaking Mizo told him "kill me with my dao not with your gun". The soldier assumed Khuangchera was attempting to attack him with the dao and shot him dead at Changsil Fort. His friend Ngurbawnga soon after succumbed to his injuries. Khuangchera's death is placed between September 26–28, 1890. Official records place Ngurbawnga's death in early October 1890.

Khuangchera's death spread fast. To preserve his legacy the villagers codified Khuangchera's values and wisdom into four points or sayings.

- Always build you jhum huts on the main spur of a hill lest you fall prey to the stalking beasts.
- Never attack your enemy, human or animal, just because you are not afraid of him. There's a time to attack and a time to withdraw. Though one must be proud, never let pride get the better of you.
- Never speak to anybody arrogantly. Always speak words of comfort.
- It is needless to get angry with the womenfolk whom you have overcome by nature.

== Legacy ==
During the Mizo National Front uprising, a battalion was named after Khuangchera and other famous Mizo pasalthas. It formed itself as part of the Dagger Brigade.

Khuangchera was declared an Indian freedom fighter. However, there was controversy and opposition to this in Mizoram. The Indian government planned a ceremony in Khuangchera's native village of Ailawng in Mizoram. Opponents of the label argued that labelling Khuangchera as an Indian freedom fighter takes away from Mizo's history and his identity as a pasaltha. The student bodies such as MZP and MSU issued a press release stating that Khuangchera was anti-British but did not fight for India. Furthermore, points were raised about many other pasaltha who resisted the British but were not included alongside Khuangchera. A boycott of the ceremony was held on 18 August 2016 at Ailawng village, where his grave stands. The students blocked the roads and protested at the airport where minister Rajen Gohain was to arrive to preside over the ceremony. As a result, Gohain cancelled the ceremony and cited he did not wish to hurt Mizo sentiments. The grave was originally built by Assam Rifles in 2010 with the epithet reading, "Duty nobly done, famous Mizo patriot, a martyr for his country, Mizo/Indian freedom fighter". The villagers of Ailawng and the Khuangchera memorial society considered erecting a new headstone and omitting the words "Mizo/Indian freedom fighter".

The cave Khuangchera explored is known as Khuangchera Puk.

== Sources ==
- Goswami, B.B (1979). The Mizo Unrest: A Study of Politicisation of Culture. Jaipur: Aalekh Publishers.
- Kashyap, Samudra Gupta (2022). Untold Stories of the Freedom Struggle from North-East India. Soochna: Publications Division, Ministry of Information and Broadcasting. ISBN 978-93-5409-664-8.
- Lalbiakthanga (1978). The Mizos: A study in racial personality. United Publishers.
- Lalthangliana, B. (2005). Culture and Folklore of Mizoram. India: Publicans Division, Ministry of information and broadcasting. ISBN 978-81-230-1309-1.
- Nibedon, Nirmal (2013). Mizoram: The Dagger Brigade. Atlanta, Georgia: Lancer Publishers. ISBN 978-1-935501-82-4.
- Roluahpuia (2023). Nationalism in the Vernacular: State, Tribes, and Politics of Peace in Northeast India. Cambridge: Cambridge University Press. ISBN 978-1-009-33954-4.
