= Kelkang =

- village
- Location in Mizoram, India Kelkang (India)
- Coordinates: 23.3877229°N 93.3074193°E
- Country: India
- State: Mizoram
- District: Champhai
- Block: Khawzawl
- Elevation: 1,287 m (4,222 ft)

Population (2011)
  - Total: 1,039
- Time zone: UTC+5:30 (IST)
- 2011 census code: 271328

Kelkang is a village in the Champhai district of Mizoram, India. It is located in the Khawzawl R.D. Block.

== Demographics ==
According to the 2011 census of India, Kelkang has 220 households. The effective literacy rate (i.e. the literacy rate of population excluding children aged 6 and below) is 97.59%.

Demographics (2011 Census)
	Total	Male	Female
Population	1039	527	512
Children aged below 6 years	167	91	76
Scheduled caste	0	0	0
Scheduled tribe	1036	525	511
Literates	851	433	418
Workers (all)	513	295	218
Main workers (total)	512	295	217
Main workers: Cultivators	455	256	199
Main workers: Agricultural labourers	4	1	3
Main workers: Household industry workers	0	0	0
Main workers: Other	53	38	15
Marginal workers (total)	1	0	1
Marginal workers: Cultivators	1	0	1
Marginal workers: Agricultural labourers	0	0	0
Marginal workers: Household industry workers	0	0	0
Marginal workers: Others	0	0	0
Non-workers	526	232	294
