= Zû (beverage) =

Rice beer beverage from Mizoram

- Type: Rice beer
- Origin: Mizoram, India, South Asia

Zû is an alcohol beverage produced as a rice beer originating from Mizoram. Zu has been known as the favoured drink among the Mizos from the chiefdom era to the modern day.

== Production ==
Zû would typically be prepared by elderly women with supervision from expert brewers in the community. Zû prepared for important ceremonies such as Chapchar Kut would be tasted by the brewing experts through a special bamboo straw.

All variations of Zû rely on a starter known as dawidim or chawl. It is a traditionally prepared dried starter made from the bark of a climber called zangzu, nilengthlum or hawhmathlum. Rice is soaked in water overnight and dried for 15 minutes to remove excess water. It is then pounded into a powder and made into a paste by adding a small amount of water. The paste is made into small circular cakes about 2 inches in diameter. The powdered zangzu is sprinkled evenly on the surface of the rice cake which is kept in a container with rice paddy husk. The container is placed in a hearth for 4 to 5 days where it swells into a ball known as chawl. The chawl is air dried and ready to be used as a starter.

== Culture ==
Zû encompasses as significant aspect of traditional Mizo culture. Traditionally the birth of a child would see them taste a diluted version of zû as their first early experience and milestone. During funeral ceremonies zû was also carried to the grave as it was believed the dead would consume it in the mitthikhua (dead man's village). Marriage ceremonies utilized zû alongside all major festivals. Zû was also used in ceremonies in Lushai animism where it was offered to Pathian, the principal deity and God. Certain rituals also reserved zû as offering to appease both good and evil spirits. Zû was so tied to the daily life of the Mizos that prisons holding Mizo inmates would provide zû despite the jail code. Before Chief Khalkam committed suicide in Hazaribagh jail, it was observed that his bowl of zû had been emptied.

== Variations ==
=== Zupui ===
Historically Zupui was the rice beer most widely used among the Mizos and their festivals. It was brewed in a big pot and stored in every house. It was produced from a mixture of bran and broken rice. However, traditionally this would never be consumed by individuals but always in a group of people. Zupui is described as a high alcohol content drink with a bitter taste and a pale white or yellow colour. It is typically consumed with undissolved rice. Nowadays most consumers of Zupui concern remote villages.

The preparation of Zupui starts with rice milled into fine power and the removal of its husk with a traditional wooden mortar and pestle known as sum and suk. A special vessel known as Bellâm is used and dedicated for cooking and steaming the milled rice and consists of two pots. The lower pot is a bigger one where water is kept and the smaller upper pot had holes in the bottom. A bamboo sieve known as ngânsap is used on the bottom of the upper pot to keep the milled rice in. The upper pot is covered as tight as possible and the space between both pots are sealed with clay. The rice is steamed until its fully cooked before being transferred to another vessel where the chawl starter is sprinkled to begin fermentation. A special earthen pot known as ngânbel is used to ferment the beverage. After fermentation a small iron pipe called dawnkâwn is used to suck out the rice beer.

=== Zufâng ===
Zufâng was made from Job's tears originally before the production of it began to use glutinous rice referred to as buh ban. Both variations of Zufâng is not considered authentic zû and do not induce intoxication easily while being as sweet as honey. James Dokhuma explains the etymology that fang means not real which implies that the drink is considered to be a lesser alcohol drink. The ease of production in Zufang afforded most if not all families to malt and brew it themselves. Zufâng is described as a low alcoholic sweet beverage consisting of a white-yellow colour with undissolved rice in it. Most consumers produce and consume it on an individual basis.

Mizo sticky rice or glutinous rice known as buhban is used as the base of the drink. The sticky rice is cooked and fermented in a special dedicated vessel known as zufângbêl after the chawl started is sprinkled over the rice to start fermentation.

=== Zulawm ===
This variation of zû was brewed for children. Young boys would contribute rice paddies and request an individual, such as widows, to brew zulawm and arrange a party. This would be done once a year.

=== Tinzu ===
Tinzu came into prominence past 1890 with the arrival of the British and non-Mizo soldiers. Their wives would make beer from husked rice known as buhfai. The rice was boiled and spread out on a mat to cool before sprinkling yeast on it. The malt known as ngan was put in tin lined with leaves or cloth to be fermented. The name Tinzu derives from the fact that this variation of zû was produced in a tin and was distinct for being as white as milk. Tinzu is known as a high alcohol content drink with a bitter taste. The colour is white or pale yellow and it is consumed after filtering out the undissolved rice. The drink is not usually consumed anymore.

Tinzu is an alcoholic beverage made from rice after the husk is removed. It does not have a specific dedicated vessel for its fermentation and so any container can work. It is prepared similar to zufâng with the exception that sticky rice is not used. The undissolved rice is filtered out.

=== Rakzu ===
Rakzu is made from rice. The Mizos learnt to distil the fermented malt from Indians in the plains and valleys. The Indians referred to the drink as Raksi, which the Mizos coined as Rakzu. This drink gained popularity in Mizoram up to the present day. Rakzu is described as a high alcohol content drink with a bitter taste. It is a clear liquid and is consumed after distilling the filtered liquor from the undissolved rice. This is the most popular beverage in the modern day, but mass production is prohibited due to Mizoram's dry state laws.

Steam distillation principle is used to prepare Rakzu. The fermentation procedure is similar to tinzu but the liquified fermentation product is again distilled using tradition steam distillation to obtain a clear and strong spirit. The distillation unit of rakzu has three main components kept on top of each other. The bottom vessel is the largest where the fermented mashed rice with water is held. The middle vessel has a hole at the bottom and a container can be kept to collect the condensed alcohol. The top vessel contains cold water which acts as a condenser. The vessels are sealed with clay and wood ash so that the steam cannot escape from the sides. The bottom vessel is heated where the steam rises and condenses before being collected in a small container. The water at the top vessel needs to be replaced periodically with cold water after it becomes warm.

== Zu customs ==
=== Consumption ===
Zû was consumed in a big cup known as nopui or the chief's cup known as Lal no. The size of the cups depended on the village and were not standardized or uniform. The nopui was crafted out of the horn of a wild bison (gaur) or a large mithun of the village. The horned cup could hold about one litre of zû. The nopui would be used to scoop out the zû from the pot and the first person to be offered it would be the chief of the village. After the chief the nopui would scoop up zû again and the chief would offer the second cup to the person of his choice whom he favoured most. This tradition is known as tawk which means give. After tawk the third scoop of the nopui would see the second person perform tawk to the person of their choice. After that each person received their own zû in their own cups.

== See also ==
- Zutho
- Mizo cuisine

== Sources ==
- Chatterjee, Subhas (1995). Mizo Chiefs and the Chiefdom. New Delhi: M D Publications PVT LTD. ISBN 81-85880-72-7.
- Lalthangliana, B (2005). Culture and folklore of Mizoram. Publications Division Ministry of Information & Broadcasting. ISBN 978-81-230-2658-9.
- Thanzami, K.; Lalhlenmawia, H. (2020). "Ethnic Fermented Foods and Beverages of Mizoram". In Tamang, Jyoti Prakash (ed.). Ethnic Fermented Foods and Beverages of India: Science History and Culture. Gangtok, Sikkim: Springer. doi:10.1007/978-981-15-1486-9. ISBN 978-981-15-1485-2.
