= Zawlbûk =

Traditional bachelorsʼ quarters of the Mizo people

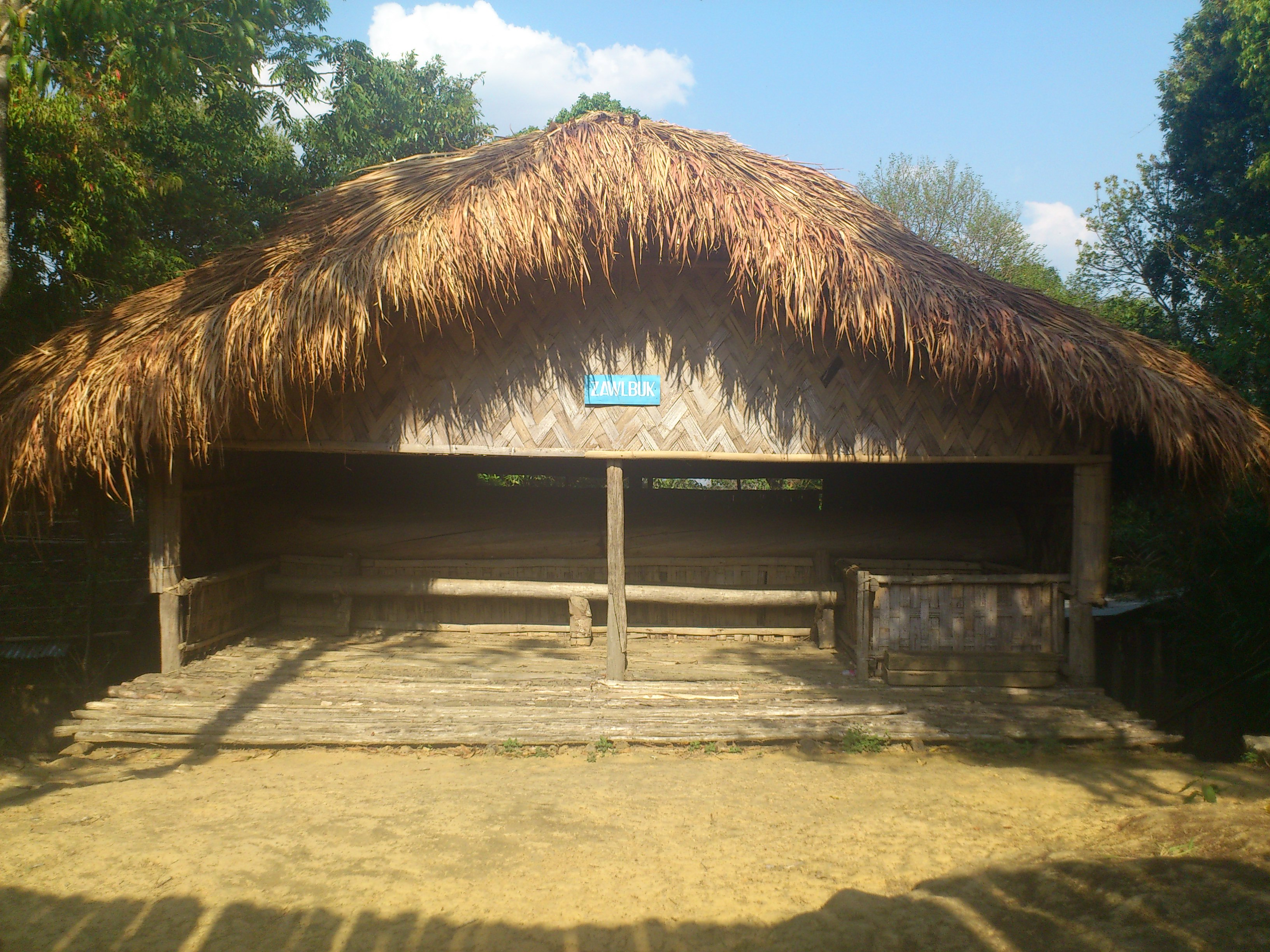
A reconstructed model of Zawlbûk at Reiek

Zawlbûk (/zɔːlˈbuːk, zɒl-/; from Lushai zâwl 'flat' and bûk 'hut') was a traditional bachelorsʼ quarters of the Mizo people, predominantly of the Luseis living in Mizoram, India. It was prominently the largest house in the tribal village, and it was customary for every village to have it constructed in the middle of the habitation. Even though its basic use was as a dormitory for all unmarried men of the village, it was much more a social institution where education, entertainment, skill and personal developments, and security of the tribal community were (almost) entirely centred. It also served as a resting place for guests, travelers and visitors.

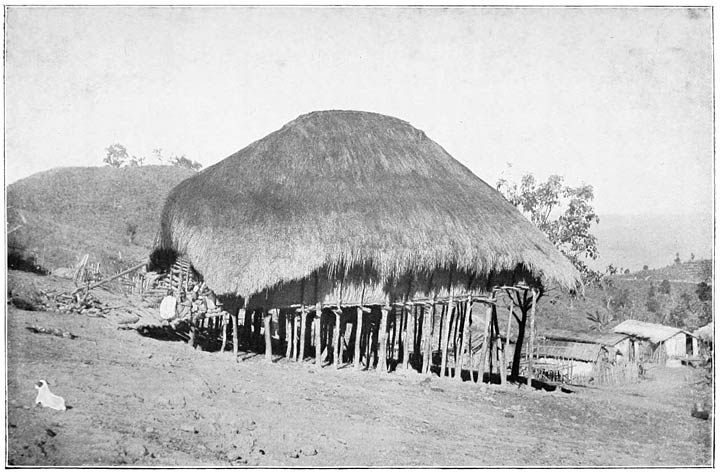
An image of Zawlbûk between 1890 and 1913

== Architecture ==
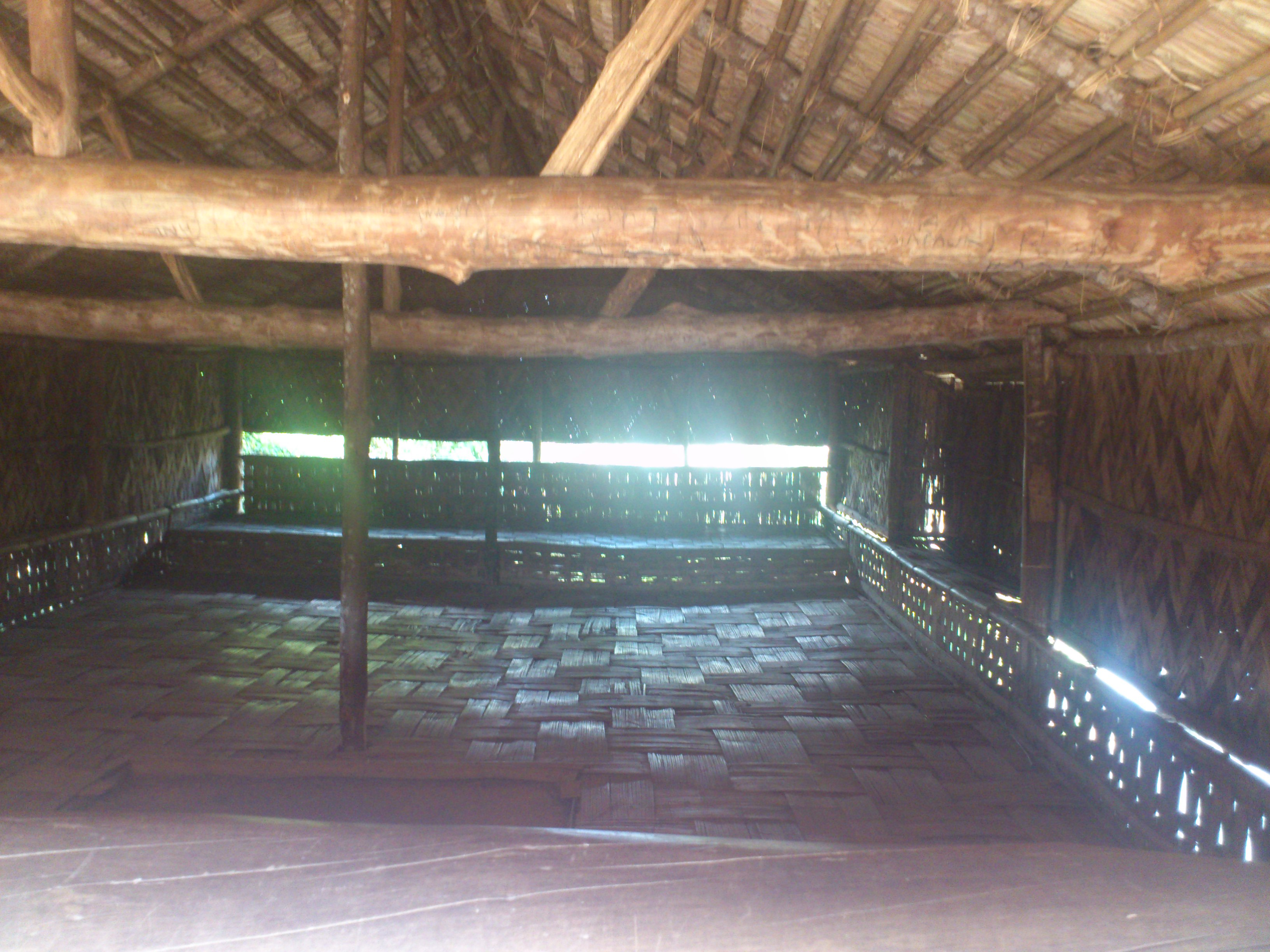
An interior design of Zawlbûk. A big log of wood at the bottom is bawhbel, a fireplace is at the centre, a horizontal opening at far end is bahzar just above dawvan.

Zawlbûk was always located at the centre of the village, in close proximity to the chief's residence. Since its basic purpose was to house all the bachelors of the village, it was dominantly the largest house. The size did vary from village to village depending on the size of the community. It was constructed through social work using timbers and thatch from the nearby forest. The timber forming the central pole is especially large to support most of the structure and is called tlung. From this were extended a sloping roof and floor with support structures. The floor and walls were made of cracked bamboo, and the roof was made entirely of thatch. It had no special entrance as the entire front was open. However, the front had a small platform or verandah with a bamboo wall hanging from the roof up to about 5 ft, making the entrance quite low. Usually to the right of this area was reserved for the stockpile of firewood. The space around this verandah was called awkpaka, which was delimited by one (or two) massive log of wood, at about 2 ft high, spanning the whole breadth of the entrance. This was known as bawhbel (or pawmpual to the southerners) and was an off-limit to the rest of the population, women, children, married men, and even the royalty and the council. The interior was simply a spacious empty room practically without any furniture, other than a fireplace at the very centre. The back wall was made into a small platform known as dawvan about 6 ft wide and 1 ft high from the floor. The entire floor served as a wrestling (which was predominantly the nightly activity) arena and the sleeping area, and is called buanzawl. Just above was the bahzar which could be opened towards the outside as a big window.

== Social structure ==
Lodging in Zawlbûk was a type of compulsory commitment in which male members of the community above 15 years of age must enter and remain there until they get married. However, residence was limited to night life only, and residents had their meals at home, and performed all personal and family chores during the day. All internal management and activities were highly democratic and entirely decided by the lodgers, and no external interference was allowed, even from the chief and the village council. Only bachelors, visitors, guests and the Val Upa were allowed.

=== Organisation ===
Zawlbûk had a structured organisation. The residents were entirely of young men, typically of above 15 years of age, properly titled tlangvâl; and the leader of the members was vâl-upa who monitored all the activities. The vâl-upa was specifically appointed by the village chief and council. In the evenings they were accompanied by boys, generally of age between 6 and 15, who were known as thingfawm naupang, or simply thingfawm, which means their sole responsibility was to collect firewood for the Zawlbûk the thingfawm naupang had to report themselves each time they collected and placed them at the thingfawm bawm while saying "Hei, ka keuh aw." because each of them were assigned specific amounts of firewood, and they had to know that they fulfilled their tasks.The thingfawm boys were restricted from participating in the main activities of the tlangval, though they were allowed to play around and join their merrymaking. The thingfawm team had a designated leader referred to as hotu, who was a young member of tlangval and whose duty was to record and report the services of each boy; absence or abstinence was a severe offence punishable by any measure.The most common punishment was doubling or tripling the amount assigned. A thingfawm boy, once found to have an adequate pubic hair, would be inducted as a permanent lodger and would remain so until his marriage. However, a thingfawm naupang can be exempt from gathering firewood if he touches a shot animal for it requires enough bravery as the animal could have been faking death and attacked anyone near it. Another way is to cut off the tail of a shot tiger. Cutting off the tail of a shot tiger was the only way of proving its death, so it also required great bravery and courage, for if the tiger was still alive, the tiger would have mauled to death the nearest living being. For selection of lodging, as tradition went, the longest pubic hair was plucked from him and if it could coil around the stem of a traditional tobacco pipe, the candidate was declared an eligible lodger, hence became a tlangvâl. Regular activities include singing folk songs, wrestling, and story telling. In front of the Zawlbûk were three heavy round stones, each of varying weights called chawilung. The first one weighs around 10-15 kg, the second one weighs 20-30 kg and the third one is approx. 50 kg or more. The young men would compete against each other in carrying the stones. To carry the stones, one has to hug the stone and use their forearm and wrists in helping them lift the stones. Another popular activity is the Insuknawr and the insai hrui pawh in which the participants try to drag each other by crawling while being tied to each other with a rope.

=== Impact and value ===
Zawlbûk was much more than a simple dormitory for regular overnight stay, it was a centre of village education, defense, discipline and development. It was strictly a social institution where all forms of arts and crafts, physical training, and moral education were taught and learned. It was practically a social network by which all sorts of information were conveyed, from news to family squabbles. It was a kind of oral library where indigenous knowledge was shared and inculcated to new generations. It also served as rendezvous in times of social conflicts, disasters and wars. One of the principles behind such gathering is clearly for safety of the entire village, as all the most able men are readily called in action. Hence it was also a form of military barracks. It was particularly important as the village lives were frequently interrupted by wild beasts and enemy invasions. In addition, it was a convenient lodging for male guests of the Zawlbûk-age from other villages. In fact it is now recognised as the cultural epitome in the Lusei society.

== Decline and dissolution ==
Even though the advent of Christianity at the end of 19th century could be attributed as the major force in weakening of Zawlbûk stronghold on Mizo culture, the ensuing inevitable socio-political changes including the rise of education in Mizoram and politics, compounded by the British rule, caused cultural upheaval. The beginning of formal education and mass conversion to Christianity indeed changed the course of ethnic identity which ultimately led to the abandonment of Zawlbûk. The status of Zawlbûk suffered a fatal blow when the power of the traditional chieftainships was stripped off and governmental administration was set up by the British. For once in the Mizo society, social division disappeared and religious activities no longer encouraged the bachelors' dormitories and their pagan lifestyle. Ironically enough, N.E. Parry, an English Superintendent (1924–28) of Lushai Hills, realising its crucial role in the Mizo society, made an attempt to revive it in 1926 by compelling all villages to rebuild their Zawlbûk, but to no avail. By then social and religious evolutions had already outpaced the usefulness or the need.

On 1 January 1938 the successor Superintendent, Anthony Gilchrist McCall, convened a public meeting at Thakthing, Aizawl, on the subject of continuing the official order of reviving Zawlbûk. The public decided that the institution was no longer compatible with formal education, Christianity and government system. Hence, McCall resolved to end Zawlbûk.

== In other cultures ==
The origin of Zawlbûk is clouded in uncertainty and is not exclusive to the Luseis. A close clan Hmar people of Manipur used to have exactly the same, which they call, Buonzawl or Sier. In fact the dormitory institution is quite common among the different tribal communities of India, but with slight variations, and not as prominent or influential as those in Mizo society. In the Northeast India, Karbis, the Tiwas, the Mishings, and the Dimasas of Assam, various tribes of Nagas of Nagaland, the Tangkhul Naga of Manipur, some other ethnic tribes of Tripura, the Garos (Nokpanti) of Meghalaya and the Abors (Nosup) and Miris (Torang) Arunachal Pradesh had this type of dormitory institution. Other Indian tribals such as the Oraon (Dhumkaria) and Munda (Gitic or Gittera) of Jharkhand, and the Kalaris of Kerala also had similar system.
