= Bawi system =

Former system of slavery in Mizoram (ab. 1927)

The Bawi system was an institution of slavery under Mizo tribes from the precolonial era until the Indian post-colonial era in the Lushai Hills (present day Mizoram). It remained an integral part of Mizo chieftainship before being challenged by Christian missionaries in the 1910s and political institutions such as the Mizo Union in the 1940s.

The Bawi system was debated by British colonialists as a system of indentured labour. It was argued that the word bawi was translated as slave wrongly by the missionary James Herbert Lorrain when creating the Lushai (Mizo) dictionary. Both Thomas Herbert Lewin and John Shakespear corroborated the view that a bawi is a person who has lost the right of individual action but is too inappropriate to be termed a slave.

Peter Fraser, a medical missionary in the British Lushai Hills opposed the Bawi system and the local Mizo chiefs who kept bawis. Fraser ransomed 40 bawis with his own expenses; however, his campaign against the Bawi System led to pushback from the British administration, who feared it could aggravate the Mizo chiefs to rebellion. Fraser was recalled back to Wales due to his attempts to abolish the system.

Abolition of the Bawi system was gradual, and by 1927, it had withered and was de-facto abolished. However, the legacy of the Bawi System organised an anti-chieftainship attitude with issues of corruption, favouritism, reflecting similarly to the Lal Sawi event before the British. The Mizo Union deemed chieftainship to be an anachronistic institution that was repressive and needed to be abolished in its entirety. In 1954, the Mizo Union abolished chieftainship with various laws. The issues of the Bawi System continuing in practice such as serfdom and bonded labour also ceased with the end of chieftainship.

== Etymology ==
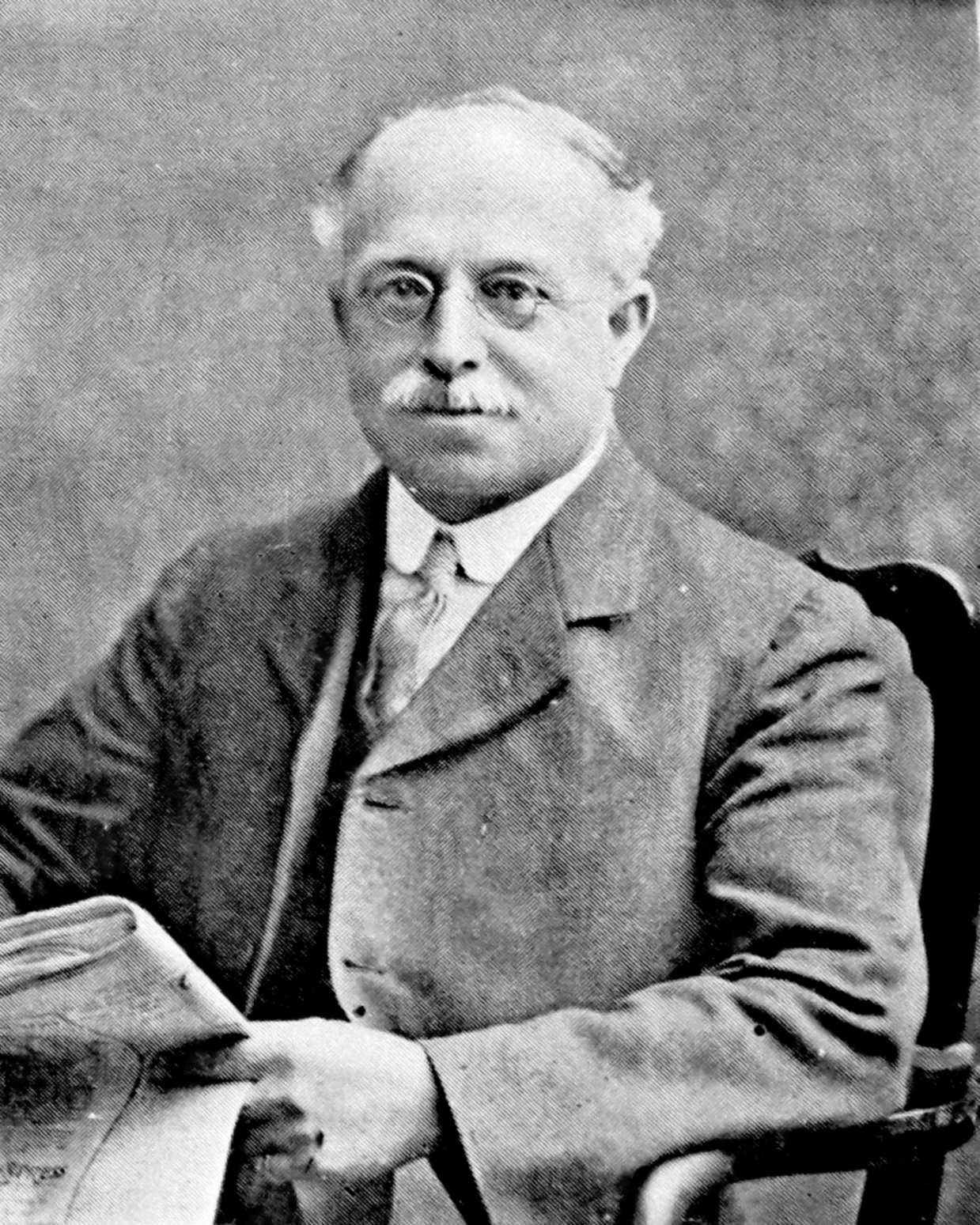
J.H. Lorrain, missionary and author of the Dictionary of the Lushai language.

Early British administrators relied on polyglot officials to develop administrative terminology in classifying and governoning the native tribes of northeast India. "Bawi" was initially recorded as a gendered term: bay-pa referred to male slaves, while bay-nu referred to female slaves. When the missionaries of the Lushai Hills created a Roman alphabet for Mizo, limitations on the representation of the tonal language led to the tonal 'o' sound being as transcribed as an 'aw' sound, making it spelt as bawi instead of boi. The word became widely used outside of a gendered context and was treated analogously to mean both slave and the institution of slavery itself.

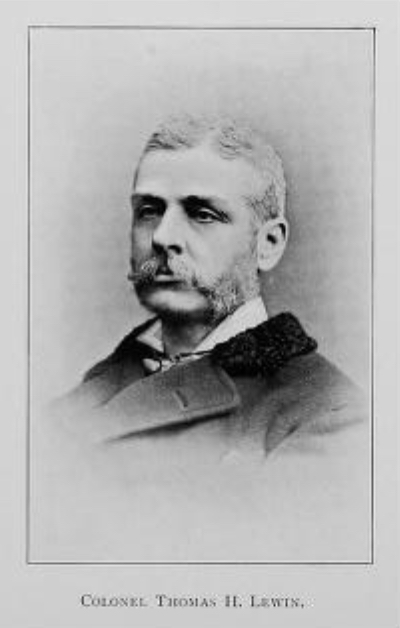
Thomas Herbert Lewin, Early British ethnologist on the Lushais.

There has been debate on the specific meaning of bawi due to the political implications of such definitions. James Herbert Lorrain, the earliest missionary to practice and settle in the Lushai Hills, studied the tribes and stated in his Dictionary of the Lushai language that bawi translates to a slave, a bondman, a vassal or a serf. Anthony Gilchrist McCall, an administrator of the Lushai Hills from 1933 to 1943, commented in his published book, Lushai Chrysalis, that Lorrain's dictionary does not provide a deep study of the language, and that defining bawi as "slave" was contentious, since most bawi were dependants of their chiefs. Thomas Herbert Lewin, the earliest British official to make contact with the Lushai tribes and their language also rejected the translation of bawi as "slave", describing the bawi as individuals who have lost the right to freedom of action. John Shakespear, the first superintendent of the Lushai Hills, wrote a monograph on the customs and ethnography of the Lushai people in Lushei-Kuki Clans where he defines bawi as persons who have taken refuge in the chief's house.

== Characteristics ==
A bawi was only permitted to belong to a chief. Unlike Chin people and Thadou people, who were culturally and geographically proximate as cognate tribes, slaves under Lushai chiefs were not sold and treated as property. A bawi was permitted to move from one chief to another chief; chiefs would accept bawis in the interest of increasing their privilege and perceived power. A bawi was also permitted to get married. If two bawis get married, then by custom, they are to live with the chief for six years. After this period, the bawi couple will build their own house and will be known as an inhrang bawi, meaning a "separate-house bawi". There were several types of bawi.

Inpuichhung bawi means an in-house slave or serf. They would become a bawi by being indebted to their chief during a crisis. This typically included extreme poverty, starvation, sickness, etc. Shakespear writes that most inpuichhung bawi were orphans, widows and other vulnerable individuals. Due to their inability to take care of themselves, these individuals were described to be in serfdom to their chief in return for shelter and food.Inpuichhung bawi constituted the majority of bawis belonging to chiefs. They were considered part of the chief's household in return for food and shelter. They managed to retain privileges such as wearing the chief's ornaments and using his weapons.

Chemsen bawi means red knife bawi. If an individual were to commit murder, then the victim's family held a right to kill the offender. The murderer had a right to take refuge in the chief's house. The murderer would cling to the foundation post of the chief's house, a practice known as lal sutpui pawm. This act would bind a chief to protect the offender from the vengeance of the victim's relatives. This was provided on the basis that the revenge seekers had not successfully injured the offender before he sought the foundation post. As the chief's subjects could not challenge him, this would guarantee the offender's protection from any retribution. A chemsem bawi in contrast to an inpuichhung bawi lived in a separate house and did not work for the chief directly. Their children would be considered bawis, and the chief had the right to the marriage price of the daughters. The chemsem bawi would also lose the right to fatherhood of their children as the chief would assume parental role of the murderer's children.

Tuklut bawi means "promised to enter" bawi. This category pertains to individuals who surrendered during wartime or deserted their village to join a winning side in a raid. To safeguard their lives, they offered themselves to the chief. These bawis were relatively free and allowed to live in separate houses from the chief. They were permitted to be relieved of bawi status by paying the chief one mithun. According to the British administration, such as Shakespear, the workload of tuklut bawi was so light that most of them never paid their ransom for freedom.

Sal in a literal meaning pertains to slavery. A sal was a person who was captured during a raid. Unlike other bawis, a sal is the personal property of the captors. They would be exchanged for goods, such as guns. A sal would typically be marriageable women or children from defeated tribes. The sal category was unique in that anybody had the right to own one, as opposed to all other categories of bawi being strictly limited to the chief. A sal could secure their freedom by paying whatever their captor demanded of them.

== History ==
During British rule in 1890, after the Chin-Lushai Expedition, the administration maintained the bawi institution. The British were reluctant to label the institution as slavery and hesitant to intervene, according to historians. Their approach saw a policy of indirect rule through the existing political structure of Mizo chieftainship. Previous rights of the chiefs were extinguished, such as the right to order capital punishment, the right to seize the property of subjects leaving their village for another chief, the right to tax foreigners trading in the hills, and the right to enact inheritance of chieftainship without British approval. While other rights, such as taxation and appointments of elders and ministers, remained. Under the British, without any raiding and inter-tribal wars and a new standardised justice system, the categories of chemsem bawi, tuklut bawi and sal became obsolete. Hence, leaving the category of dependent serfs to be retained as an institution under British rule. Most missionaries also did not interfere in the bawi institution and believed that converting the Lushai Hills would lead to a growth in public moral consciousness that would allow the system to wither away.

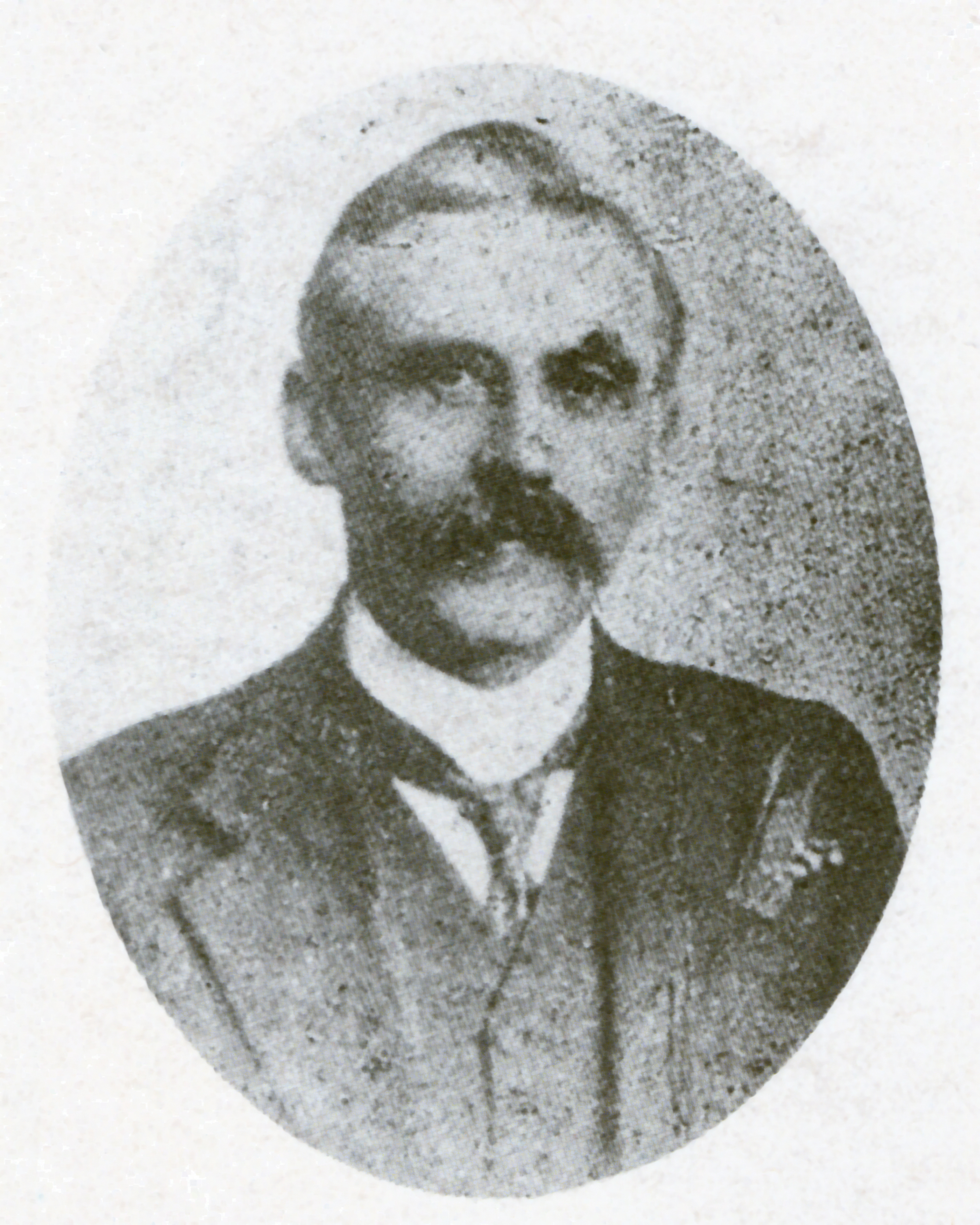
Dr. Peter Fraser, who lead the campaign against the bawi system

Peter Fraser, a missionary doctor in the Lushai Hills, raised concerns about the continuation of the bawi institution among the chiefs. Fraser worked with chiefs such as Khawvelthanga of Muabuang, who converted to Christianity, in supporting his endeavours. Fraser began his campaign by spending his own money in ransoming the freedom of as many bawis as he could. The chiefs were happy with the flow of cash but began to oppose Fraser's efforts when more and more bawis contacted Fraser to free them. The traditional economy of Lushai chiefdoms heavily relied on manpower and labour distribution and functioned as markers of prestige for chiefs. Freed bawis spread the news of Fraser's deeds and led to an increase in bawis seeking liberation. Facing opposition from chiefs encouraged Fraser to convince his local administration to attempt to abolish the bawi system on the basis that slavery had been banned by law in all British colonies including the British Raj. Fraser embarked on a political campaign to abolish the bawi system in the Lushai Hills. To Fraser, the continuation of the Bawi system went against the British abolishment of slavery in 1833. The bawis freed by Fraser lived in hostels built by Fraser to provide shelter. In return, the freed bawis assisted Fraser in his missionary efforts of preaching, coolie duties and forming a choir and band known as Krawss Sipai in 1911.

Fraser established testimonies of the free Bawis that stated they were slaves, bonded for generations, and held a desire to be free. Fraser used this to convince Rev. D.E Jones that the bawi system was a hurdle in proselytizing the Lushai Hills into Christianity. Rev Jones subsequently published an issue in the Monthly treasury as a sign of support for Fraser's struggle and his initiative in ransoming bawis from the chiefs. In a meeting with superintendent H.W.G. Cole, the two missionaries were told that the issue needed a consensus from all missionaries. Many Christian missionaries did not share his views initially. With Fraser's encouragement, the missionaries took up investigations and discussions and often held merits to Fraser's perspective on the system.

F.W Savidge later wrote regarding his changed perspective of the bawi system:

Having considered the pros and cons - I think now that a system is a most iniquitous one, and if it could be done away with speedily as possible in to, it would be the mutual advantage of the government and governed.

— Slavery on British Territory, Assam and Burma, Letter to H.W.G Cole, January 1910

J.H Lorraine corroborated the view stating that:

Careful enquiry had now convinced me that its abolition would be hailed as a blessing by a very large majority of the inhabitants of this hills, and that very few, if any, of the poor and destitute would suffer hardship because of the non-existence of the system as it now stands.

— Slavery on British Territory, Assam and Burma, Letter to Fraser, January 1910

D.E Jones undertook an extensive and deep investigation of the issue, commenting that:

Although the system has been tolerable in the hands of the chiefs, it allows cruel chief to oppress. Notwithstanding, the apparent freedom of the Bawis they are often all 'bound' until ransom is found. The fact that many go back to the chiefs is no argument for its permanence.

— D.E Jones, in Slavery on British Territory, Assam and Burma, The Bawi (Boi) System, February 2010

However, the missionaries hesitated to support Fraser as they viewed him as scrupulous. In any chance, a potential misstep would reflect on their missionary efforts and the Bawis under the system. The missionaries, such as Jones, advocated for a slow and gradual abolition with the administration's efforts. However, Fraser rebuked and considered the abolishment of the Bawi system an urgent issue to resolve.

The administration did not agree with Fraser's position. H.W.G Cole argued in a view shared by bureaucrats and administrators that the bawi system provided for the sustenance of many poor and destitute who took shelter with the well-to-do chiefs in return for a lifetime of service. To abolish the system would abandon the welfare of the needy in society. Fraser was also friends with the chancellor of Exchequer Lloyd George, who would later become the prime minister of Britain. Fraser mentioned this friendship in passing to H.W.G Cole that Lloyd George would assist him in compensating the chiefs. H.W.G Cole in protest published an article in the newspaper, Mizo leh Vai Chanchin Bu, stating that the bawi system is not a form of slavery but closer to a 'membership of the house'. The administration preferred indirect rule through the chiefs and preferred not to agitate them by taking away a fundamental institution of chieftainship. British administrators cited John Shakespear's views on the inpuichhung bawi as a system of protecting the poor and destitute.

The system of chief supporting orphans and subsequently receiving the price of the girls and certain payments from the boys seems to be sound.

— John Shakespear, The Lushei-Kuki Clans

Shakespear's position was to modify the system without deprecating the status and prestige of the chiefs. In this sense, the British administration did not want to abolish the Bawi system nor consider it a form of slavery, as Fraser claimed.

The arrival of mautam famine impacted Fraser's campaign concerning the bawi system. One of the reasons chiefs opposed freeing of bawis was due to the importance of conserving labour during the hard times of famine. Many villagers pre-emptively bound themselves to the chief in anticipation of the famine upon the flowering of bamboo. As the British response to the 1911 mautam famine was well prepared, many individuals desired to be freed of their bawi status by Fraser. Fraser also could not convert the bawis to Christianity based on the orders of their chiefs, who were in charge of the decisions concerning the bawis.

Fraser was supported by Mary Winchester, the kidnapping victim of the Lushais that sanctioned the Lushai Expedition. Mary Innes Howie continued to fight for the abolition of the Bawi system and helped raise the issue to the British parliament. She wrote to the undersecretary in 1913 to inform them of her personal experience among the Lushais. She argued against John Shakespear's interpretation of the system and outlined that if it were not for the Lushai Expedition she would have been placed into serfdom of the chiefs herself. Mary Innes Howie would establish the Anti-Slavery and Aborigines Society in the United Kingdom. Reverend Peter Fraser would join the society alongside many other forward-looking missionaries and liberal Englishmen. Mary Innes Howie also challenged the Assam government's decision to bar Fraser to return to the Lushai Hills. The government issues a response stating that:

The Chief Commissioner could not overlook the fact that unnecessary interference with the customs of a semi-savaged people might easily lead to grave political trouble, and that if Superintendent was to be responsible for the peace and tranquility of the district he must be allowed to exercise a reasonable measure of control.

— Chief Commissioner's Response

Furthermore, the British administration offered an ultimatum to Fraser to cease his efforts and campaign against the Bawi system and stick to missionary work or leave the Lushai Hills. Upon refusal to sign, H.W.G Cole expelled Fraser from the Lushai Hills.

Fraser would return to the Lushai Hills with permission from the British government before being expelled from the British Raj on resumption of his campaign. Fraser's exit saw the issue resolved with progressive measures. The Bawi system was modified thus allowing the word to be formally discontinued in replacement of a more neutral and uncontroversial term. Any remaining cases of bawi who were Chemsem or Tuklut from wars and raids before British annexation were given limited claims for their consideration. The maximum liability of a bawi was capped at ₹40 or one gayal for a whole family. Bawi were also now permitted to leave their master at will. Disputes regarding bawi matters were now settled with Mizo customs rather than British or colonial laws.:

In 1927, the Assam government substituted the term Bawi with chhungte or awmpui which means inmates of the house. With this, the institution of the bawi system ceased in 1927. Upon British departure from the Indian subcontinent, half of the population in Mizoram would be Christian. In the remaining villages following Lushai animism, the Bawi system would continue to unofficially exist. Many of the freed bawis fell victim to economic exploitation and poverty upon release. These freed bawis would become supporters of the abolition of chieftainship act. Christian missionaries accommodated the freed bawis while others would begin migrations to other areas of Mizoram. Nag argues that the abolishment of Chieftainship in 1954 led to the dissolution of Mizo chieftainship, hence truly ending the Bawi system along with it as it relied on chiefs to facilitate the social order. The Mizo Union functioned on the principles of the Indian National Congress at the time, which held anti-monarchist and chiefly rule and institutions. This bid was popular with many individuals who saw the institution becoming outdated. Furthermore, the peaceful abolishment of both institutions proved the British administration wrong in their rationale to maintain it out of peacekeeping concerns.

== See also ==
- Mizo Chieftainship
- H.W.G. Cole

== Sources ==
- Baite, Mary Nengneichong (2010–2011). "The Institution of Slavery in the Chin Society". Proceedings of the Indian History Congress. 71 (1): 794–904. JSTOR 44147548.
- Chakraborty, P.; Prasad, R.N (2006). Administration of Justice in Mizoram. New Delhi: Mittal Publications. ISBN 81-8324-059-3. LCCN 2006346654. OCLC 67393653. OL 13175938M.
- Chatterjee, Indrani (2006). "Slavery, Semantics, and the Sound of Silence". In Chatterjee, Indrani; Eaton, Richard M. (eds.). Slavery and South Asian History. Bloomington, Indiana: Indiana University Press. p. 285-315. ISBN 9780253116710. OCLC 191950586. OL 29038362M.
- Chatterjee, Suhas (1995). Mizo Chiefs and the chiefdom. New Delhi: M D Publicatgions PVT LTD. ISBN 978-8185880723. LCCN 95901189. OCLC 32894795. OL 944576M.
- Hrangchal, Lalhrilmoi (2014). "Revisiting the Boi System of Lushai Hills" (PDF). Journal of North East India Studies. 4 (2): 41–54.
- Lewin, Thomas Herbert (1874). Progressive Colloquial Exercixes in the Lushai Dialect of the 'Dzo' or Kuki Language with vocabularies and popular tales (Notated). Calcutta: Calcutta Central Press Company.
- Lloyd, J. M. (1991). History of the Church in Mizoram: Harvest in the Hills. Aizawl, Mizoram: Synod Publication Board.
- Lorrain, James Herbert; Savidge, Frederick William (1898). A Grammar and Dictionary of the Lushai Language (Dulien Dialect). Shillong: Assam Secretariat Printing Department.
- Muivah, Yaruipam (2024). "Regulating Slavery: The Bawi Question in Colonial Lushai Hills". Gender in Slave and Post-Emancipation Societies. 9. doi:10.4000/11o9w.
- McCall, Anthony G. (1977) [1949]. Lushai Chrysalis. Calcutta: Firma KLM Private. LCCN 78911577. OL 4390328M.
- Nag, Sajal (21 April 2016). The Uprising: Colonial State, Christian Missionaries, and Anti-Slavery Movement in North-East India (1908-1954). India: Oxford University press. ISBN 978-0-19-946089-2. LCCN 2015515443. OCLC 948338892. OL 28604513M.
- Nag, Sajal (2012). "Rescuing Imagined Slaves: Colonial State, Missionary and Slavery Debate in North East India (1908-1920)". Indian Historical Review. 39 (1): 57–71. doi:10.1177/0376983612449529.
- Prasad, Y. D. (1987). "Slavery in Modern India: A Case Study of Early 20th Century Mizoram". Proceedings of the Indian History Congress. 48 (1): 556–563. JSTOR 44141754.
- Samuelson, Ramchuani Sena (1985). Love Mizoram. Imphal: Goodwill Press. LCCN 91909636. OCLC 26542295. OL 1687735M.
- Samuelson, Rami Sena (1991). The Mizo people: Cultural analysis of life in a Mizo village in the 1890's. San Francisco: University of San Francisco. p. 90.
- Shakespear, John (1912). The Lushei Kuki Clans. London: Macmillan and Co. LCCN 14000139. OCLC 574955962. OL 6563643M.
- Vanlaldika, Andrew H. (2014). Social Stratification in Mizo Society. New Delhi: Mittal Publications. ISBN 978-81-8324-475-6. LCCN 2014360094. OCLC 893890029. OL 31127060M.
- Zorema, J. (2007). Indirect Rule in Mizoram: 1890-1954. New Delhi: Mittal Publications. ISBN 978-81-8324-229-5. OCLC 271837683. OL 48056042M.
