= History of Christianity in Mizoram =

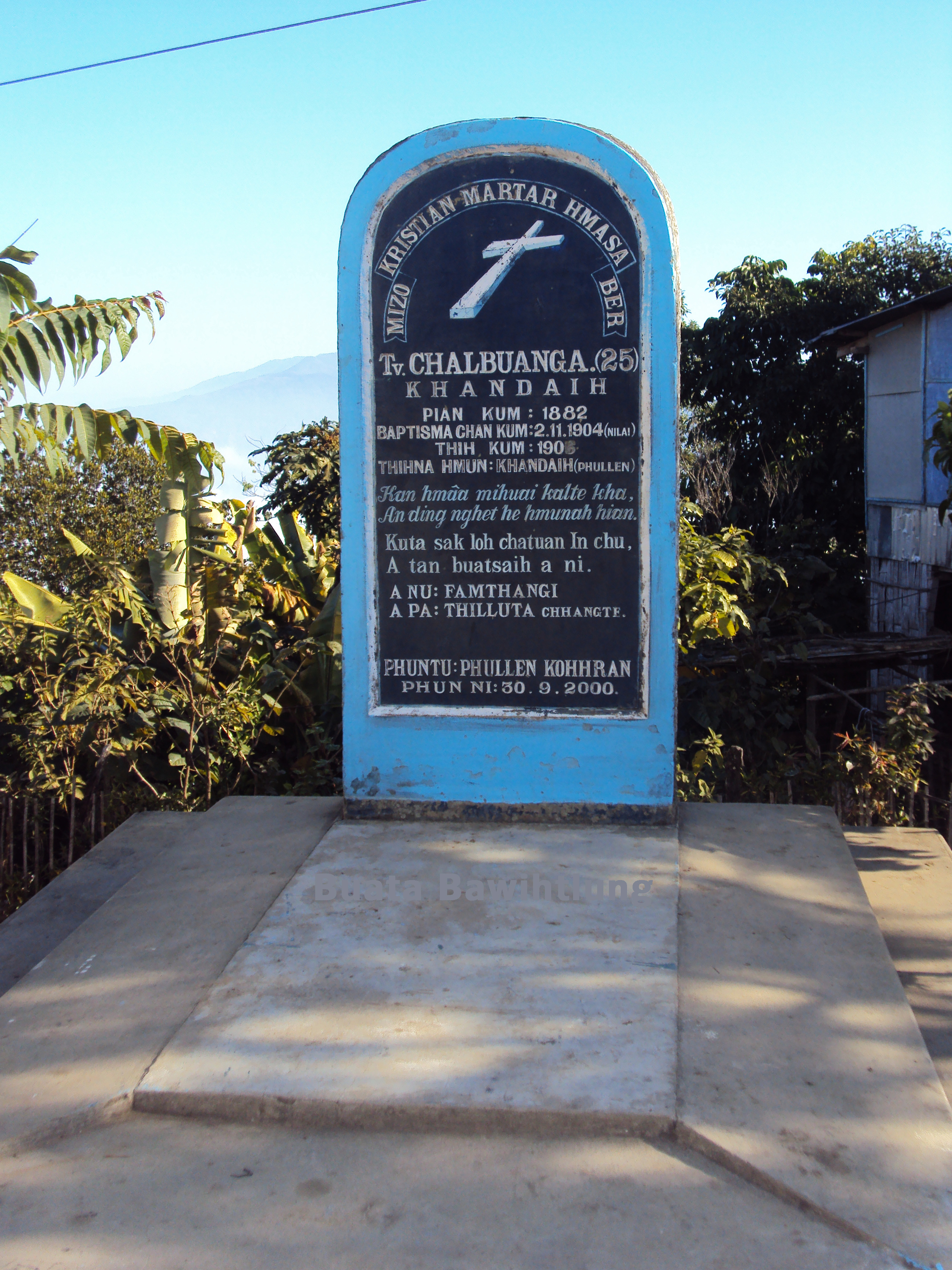
The memorial to the first Mizo martyr, Chalbuanga, in Phullen, who was persecuted by Chief Vanphunga

The history of Christianity in Mizoram covers the origin and development of all forms of Christianity in Mizoram since the British occupation at the end of the 19th century until Indian independence. Christianity arrived due to British intervention in tribal warfare and raids on British plantations. The ensuing punitive British military expedition was called the Lushai Expedition of 1871. The subsequent annexation of the erstwhile Lushai Hills to the British Empire opened the gateway for British Christian missions to evangelise the Mizo people.

By the 1890s, the British Empire occupied all of Lushai Hills. The natives were still under the influence of several tribal chiefdoms, practising Sakhua (Lushai Animism) and lacking a writing system. There was an urgent need to introduce formal education. The solution came in the form of Christian missionaries. The first Christian Missionary to step into the land of Lushai (Mizoram) was William Williams of the Welsh Mission, in 1891. But, he got little or no time to spread the gospel and then died at a young age due to illness. The pioneers were James Herbert Lorrain (who was given a Mizo name, Pu Buanga) and F.W. Savidge (who was named Sap Upa), sent by the Arthington Aborigines Mission in London, who entered Lushai Hills in 1894, the year recorded in Mizoram as the "advent of the Gospel".

The Arthington mission was of Baptist persuasion, and the two missionaries were of the Baptist Church, along with David Evan Jones (Zosaphluia) from the Welsh Mission. The Welsh Calvinistic Methodist Church (later constituted in India as the Presbyterian Church of India) was established by D.E. Jones in the 1890s at Aizawl and later, the Baptist Church (Baptist Church of Mizoram) at Lunglei by Lorrain and Savidge. The first church was of Baptist church established at Sethlun, Lunglei. The first recorded Christian convert was M. Suaka, chieftain of Durtlang, near Aizawl, and the first people baptised were Khuma and Khara of the Presbyterian Church. Other denominations soon arrived, including Catholic, Salvation Army, United Pentecostal Church, Seventh-day Adventists and others.

Half a century later, the Mizos, by and large, were converted. A variety of indigenous denominations also emerged. The new religion was immensely effective at overturning the traditional culture. Christianity turned into a new culture and ethnic identity. Attempts of revival of Mizo culture in the 1960s were objected by the Church. However, in the 1970s, the Church, upon seeing the loss of Mizo culture, began to revive several traditions such as Chapchar Kut. While Krismas is the biggest festival in Mizoram, Chapchar Kut is the second biggest due to these efforts.

By the end of the 20th century, Mizoram became one of the most Christian-populated states in percentage behind Nagaland. The legacy of Christianity has led to the highest literacy rate as of May 20, 2025 in India. Demographically, the native population is predominantly Christian.

== Background ==
=== Lushai Expedition ===
Before the mid-19th century, Mizos were virtually unknown. The British Empire, which had occupied all the surrounding Chittagong and Burma, had little to no interaction with the tribes or their lands. The Mizos then lived in small and isolated clusters of tribal chiefdoms, often raising warfare against each other. Their religious views were dominated by the primal religion of Sakhua, which was influenced by animism. This was accompanied by a unique concept of an afterlife called Pialral. They practised elaborate rituals, including animal sacrifice, and functioned on priests known as Puithiam and medicine men known as Bawlpu. The British officers used to subsequently describe these practices as of "irreclaimable savages".

Around 1850, the Mizos started to encroach on the British plantations in the neighbouring Cachar. The raid was most severe in 1871 when a series of attacks resulted in several deaths on both sides, with extensive damage on the plantations. A number of workers and soldiers were taken prisoner, and among them a six-year-old Mary Winchester. Mary Winchester was taken hostage by Bengkhuaia warriors, while other prisoners were executed on the way. To retaliate, the British military organised a punitive expedition named the Lushai Expedition in 1871–1872 in the northern region. General Bourchier led the expedition and, after encountering overwhelming resistance and unfamiliar terrain, rescued Mary Winchester and the other British hostages. Mizo chiefs of the offending tribes made a truce not to make further encroachments.

=== Chin-Lushai Expedition ===
However, the terms of the truce were broken in 1888–1889. In 1889 British military was forced on a second expedition. The Chin-Lushai Expedition of 1889–90 oversaw the subjugation of all the major chiefdoms throughout Mizoram (then called Lushai Hills). The British permanently fortified in major villages such as Aijal (now Aizawl) and Lungleh (now Lunglei). The land came under military occupation and subjected to the British rule.

== History ==
=== Initial missionary endeavours ===
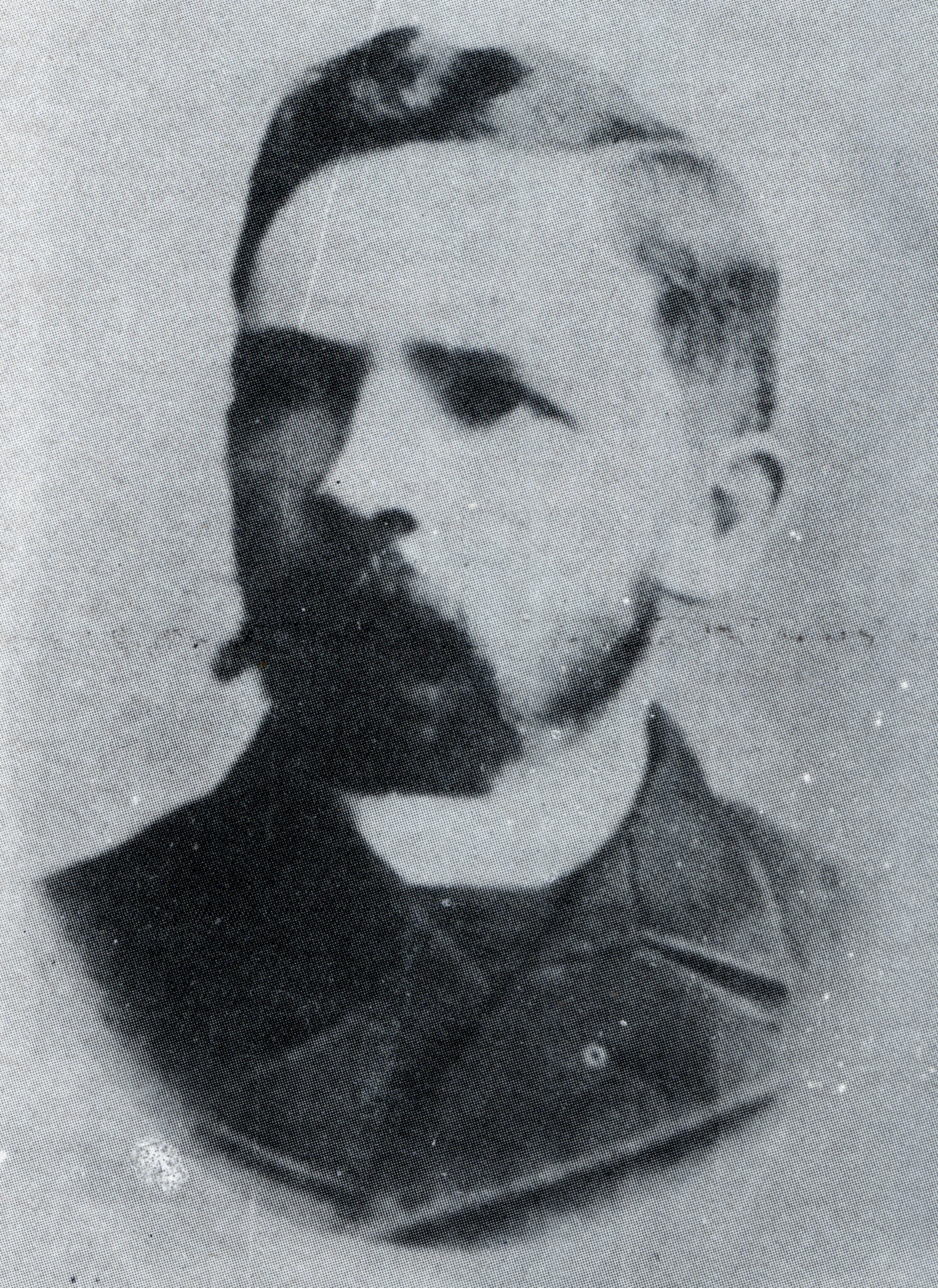
William Williams, the first missionary to enter Mizoram

Christian missionaries began to visit the Lushai Hills administration as early as 1891. A young Welsh Presbyterian missionary, William Williams, who was working in Khasi Hills happened to meet Mizo prisoners at Sylhet prison in February 1891. As many of the prisoners were Mizo chiefs this raised the idea to visit the newly annexed territory of the Lushai Hills. Williams wrote to the Liverpool office Missionary secretary Josiah Thomas requesting permission to visit the Lushais. In his letter Williams stipulates his desire to spread the gospel to "bring peace amongst them". He further wrote a letter describing the newly annexed territory, which was published in the Welsh newspaper Baner ac Amserau Cymru. Due to the Lushai Rising, the new territory was limited to military personnel and did not permit civilians to enter. Williams formed a party of Christian activists consisting of Benjamin Aitken (Free Church of Scotland), Kasinath (An Assamese preacher) and a Christian Manipuri before gaining entry.

Williams and the party members travelled on rivers preaching the gospel before landing in Changsil, which was two days away from Aizawl. Aitken, who was also a journalist, published an article on the forestry and living conditions of the Lushais in the newspaper "Englishman". On 15 March 1891, Williams and his party met with the first Mizos, where they exchanged tobacco and yarn and handed out scripture to Mizo children. Williams and the party met with Robert Blair McCabe, the political officer of the North Lushai Hills, where the Lushai Rising under Chief Khalkam was narrated to them. After staying in Sairang, Williams went on horseback to Aizawl and crossed the path where Herbert Richard Browne had been ambushed and killed and described the remains of the massacred group. On 20 March 1891, Williams arrived at Fort Aizawl. Williams recorded more observations of Lushai life and handed out biblical iconography. Initial interactions about the gospel resulted in Lushais proclaiming "God is good" and that they identified God as Khuavang. Williams also recorded the number of non-Lushais such as Khasis, Manipuris and Nagas. Each of the party members spoke their respective languages for each of the groups to spread the gospel. Williams wrote to the Welsh Presbyterian Mission of his intention to evangelise the Lushais. However, Williams would die of typhoid on 21 May 1892 and was buried in Shillong.

On closer scrutiny of Williams' activities during his visit, the date of his arrival, 15 March, is declared as the true "Missionary Day" by the Mizoram Presbyterian Church in its 89th General Assembly in 2012.

=== Patronage of Robert Arthington ===
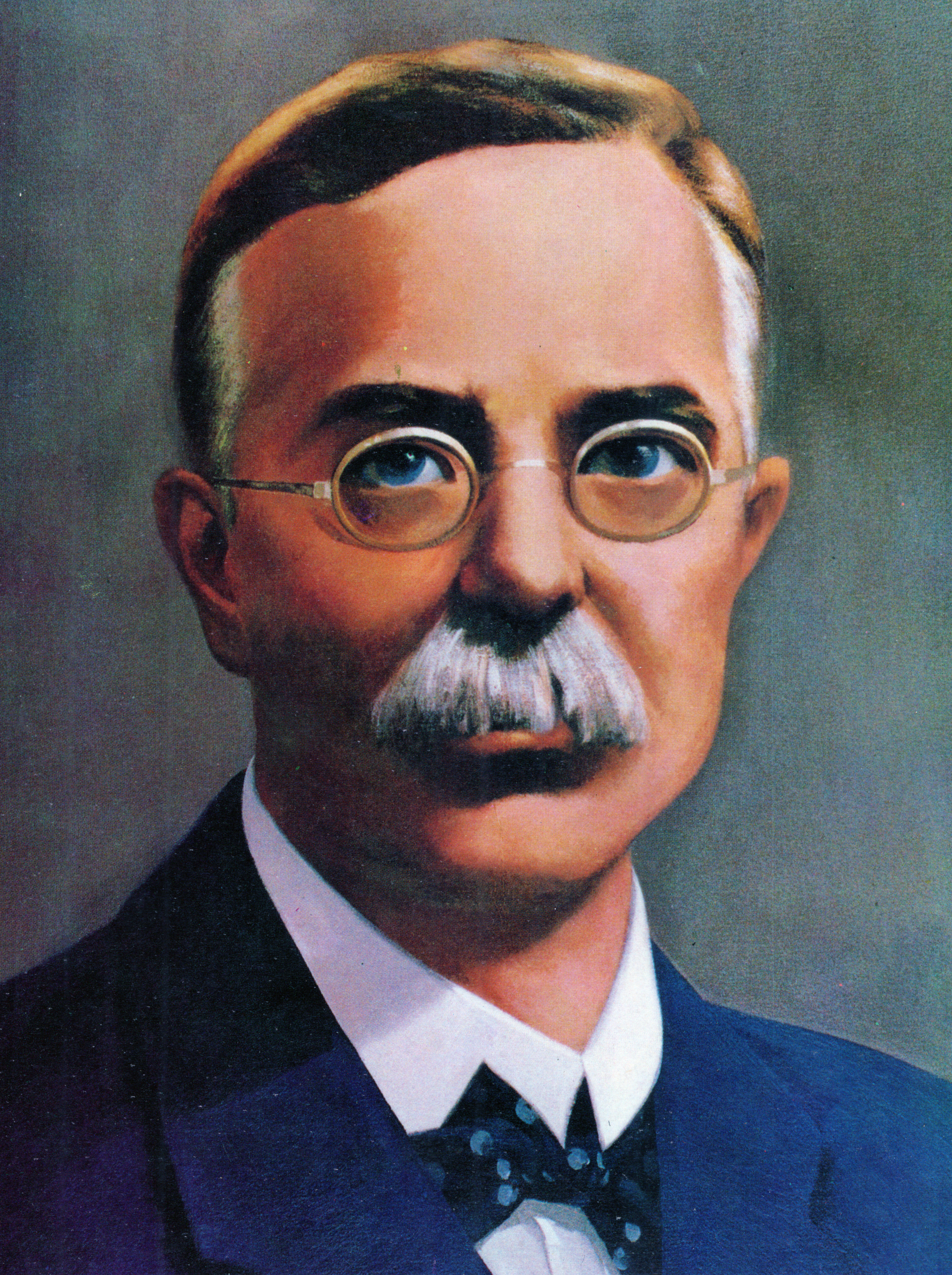
Rev. F. W. Savidge

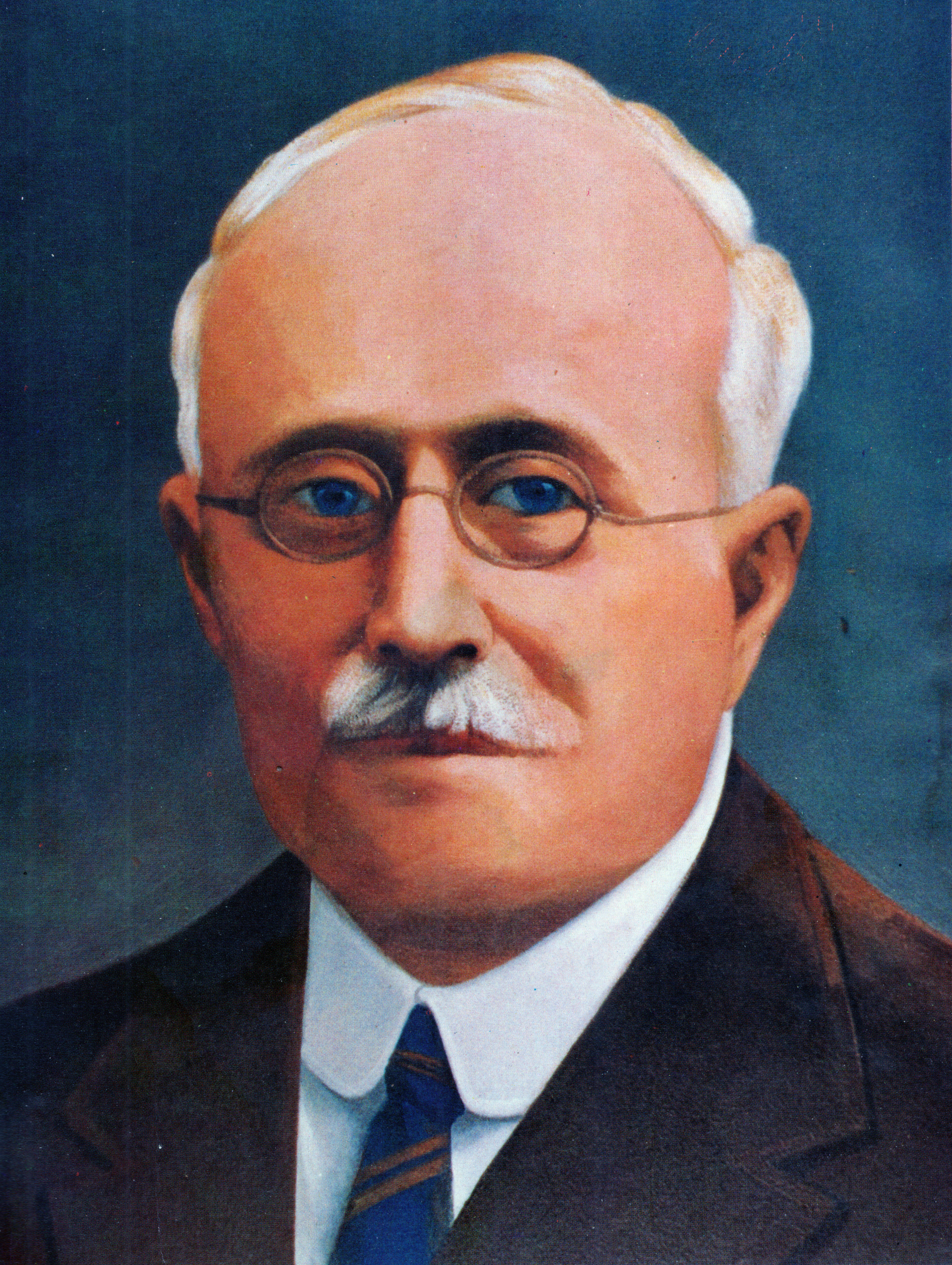
Rev. J. H. Lorrain

Robert Arthington, a British philanthropist and Christian patron, taking an interest in the missions among the Lushai tribes, began funding a mission with the help of the BMS or Baptist Mission Society. This led to the establishment of the Arthington Aborigines Mission in 1889 for the evangelisation of tribal people in northeast India. For Mizos he chose J.H. Lorrain and F.W. Savidge of the London Southgate Road Baptist Church. Arthington arranged for missionaries to attend in pairs to uncontacted groups in the British empire to spread the gospel. However, he did not allow missionaries to remain for more than a few years, which limited the learning of local languages. This meant most evangelisation was done via local interpreters.

=== Arthington Aborigines Mission ===
The arrival of Christianity and formal education in Mizoram is due to Robert Arthington's efforts in the Arthington Aborigines Mission. Lorrain reached India on 21 January 1891. Lorrain initially applied to work as a missionary in Agartala among the Tripuri tribes but his application was rejected. Frederick William Savidge arrived in Bengal in November 1891. The two met at an evangelical campaign at Brahmanbaria (now in Bangladesh) organised by the New Zealand Baptists. They applied to start work in Tripura, but they were rejected once more. Following this, they made a decision to enter the Lushai Hills. They were only allowed to stay at Kasalong village, the nearest possible location. This was due to constant insurgency from the Mizo tribes. After several months of starvation and dysentery, they moved to Darjeeling and finally to Silchar. They applied to work in Tripura but were objected by the king of Tripura. They waited for one whole year in 1893 for fresh permission in Silchar. They remained with the Welsh Presbyterian Mission under Dr. T.J. Jones. While at Silchar, they frequently met Mizo travellers, from whom they started learning their language. Finally, a permit was issued by political officer A.W. Davis to visit Aizawl. They immediately set off on Tlawng River in a canoe on Boxing Day of 1893. They arrived in Aizawl on 11 January 1894. The day is now observed as a public holiday as "Missionary Day" in the state.

Difficulties were affecting the missionaries from the first day of stepping in Aizawl. There was no local Kukis to carry their luggage boxes to Aizawl which meant the missionaries had to carry their own provisions and sleep on it. Sustenance was difficult to come by and growing their own vegetables was difficult due to flooding, insects and wild goats. Lushai tribesmen also failed to understand the teetotalism of the missionaries. Many staff of colonial institutions, from education to medicine and engineers, often contributed to the spread of Christianity in their personal efforts beyond the roles they were entitled under. British engineers installed musical organs in Welsh churches, government officials contributed and published missionary literature, and missionaries moonlighted themselves as school inspectors, among others.

The missionaries were advised by the administration to not encamp more than one mile outside of Aizawl as the country was considered unsafe due to the previous Lushai Risings. Due to this, under advice from Granville Henry Loch, they made camp at Thingpui Huan Tlang (transl. Tea Garden Hill, now MacDonald Hill) in Zarkawt. Lorrain and Savidge constructed a bamboo house with a thatched roof made from sungrass after being granted permission to trade salt to labourers to work for them.

Despite previous publications on the Mizo language from Thomas Herbert Lewin and Brojo Nath Saha, there was no Mizo alphabet. Lorrain and Savidge immediately worked on creating Mizo alphabets based on the Roman script. Chief Lalsuaka of Durtlang aided the missionaries by sitting with them and teaching them the native language 9–10 in the morning. In the afternoon, Chief Thangphunga would teach. Despite both men teaching and translating scripture, they resisted conversion to Christianity, with lalsuaka becoming Christian later in life. Both chiefs would argue with the early Mizo converts as having authoritative knowledge of the bible from being the first translators. Thangphunga and Lalsuaka translated and published the Gospels of Luke and John, and Acts of the Apostles. The first Mizo language book ever published was a child's primer published by the Assam Government in 1895. Lorrain further published a dictionary of the Lushai language. Lorrain continued to expand on the dictionary until his death in 1940 with a total of 33,000 words recorded. Both missionaries also translated and published several hymns. After only two and half months, Savidge started the first school on 1 April 1894 in Chief Thangphunga's village. It was consisted of one wall and a clay floor. Parents were reluctant to send their children for education and the missionaries used sweets to entice students to attend classes. A Sunday School was formed with services held weekly. During the first four years the missionaries failed to convert or baptise any individuals. Despite suspicion of the missionaries to subjugate the Lushai via the power of words, many came to appreciate high quality medicine possessed by the missionaries.

The Arthington Mission mandated the missionaries to move to new tribes after two to three years and had no intention of establishing churches. Lorrain and Savidge's efforts over five years only led to the baptism of two converts, which eventually convinced Robert Arthington to demand to move to new tribes. Lorrain and Savidge departed from Aizawl for England on 31 December 1897. Replacements for Lorraine and Savidge were considered such as Richard Burgess but he was appointed General Secretary of the India Sunday School Union. As a result, Robert Arthington authroised to hand over the responsibility of evangelisation to the Welsh Mission. Robert Arthington died in 1900 and thus the Baptist Missionary Society solely inherited his wealth. Lorrain and Savidge returned to India again as part of the Assam Frontier Pioneer Mission for the Abor people instead of the Lushai Hills.

=== Calvinistic Methodist Mission ===
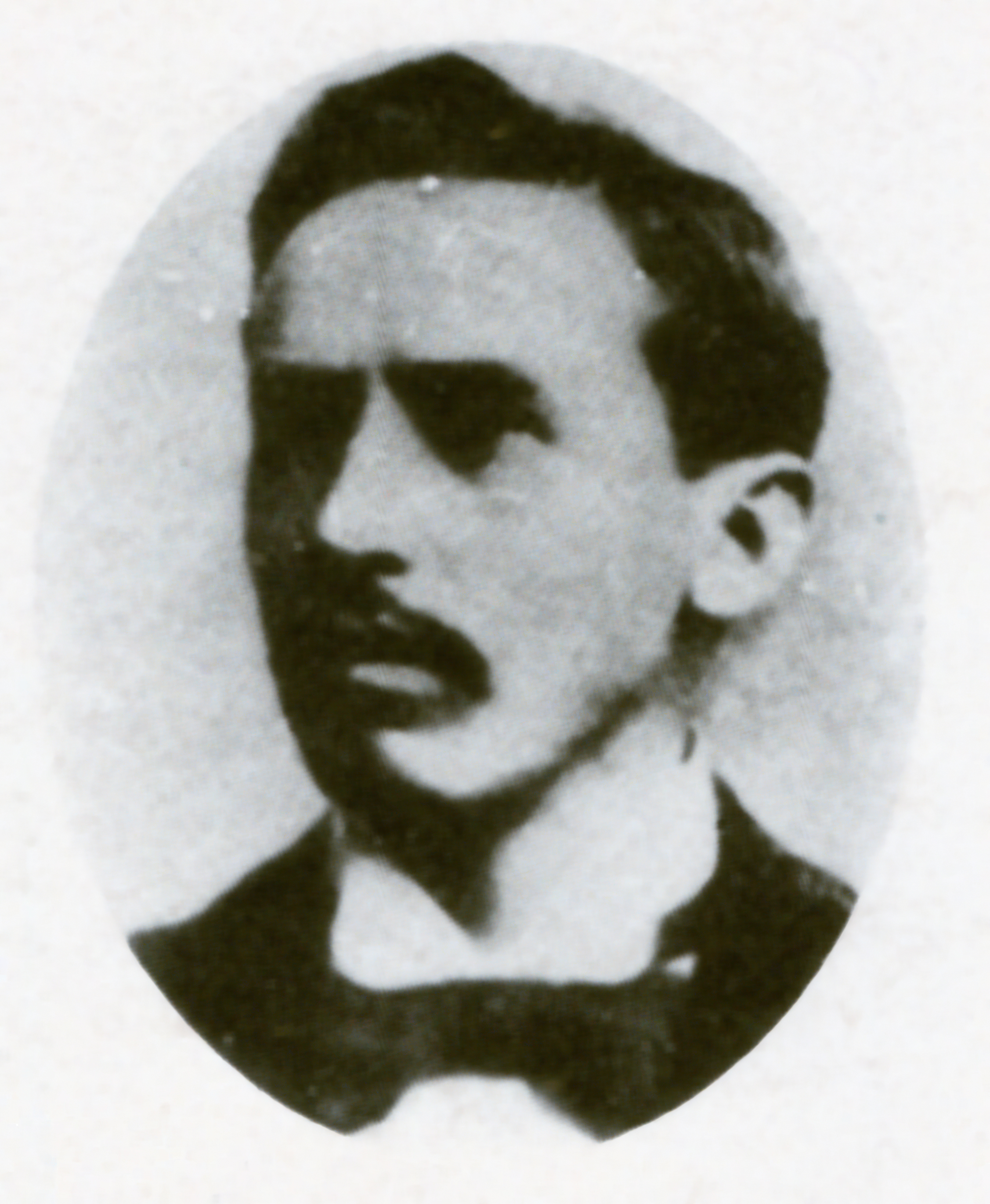
Rev. David Evan Jones

Calvinistic Methodist Church (now properly the Presbyterian Church of Wales) took over the Lushai Hills as its mission field and sent their first missionary Reverend David Evan Jones, who arrived in Aizawl on 31 August 1897, shortly before the Arthington Mission's brief departure. Jones settled in Lorrain and Savidge's house on Thingpui Huan and met with the two missionaries before their departure. The missionaries encouraged Jones to sing hymns which failed but illustrated the attraction of the Lushai people to tunes. When Lorrain and Savidge departed, Jones had only mastered 90 words in the Mizo language. Jones sought to proclaim preaching at Fort Aijal, which possessed a growing population, but was also forbidden to proselytise the soldiery stationed at the fort. Since Mizos were appointed for local government roles, Aizawl became a node for various distant villages to convene, and this would encourage exposure of Christian teachings from one location to the most locations.

Jones struggled with the first few conversions initially. His second and fourth converts were expelled shortly after being received into communion. Jones' sixth and seventh converts left the church in 1904 and 1905. The 1901 census recorded 45 Christians in a population of 82,000. The progress of early missionaries was insignificant, with a slow, successful rate of conversion.

On his birthday on 15 February 1898, Jones opened a school at his bungalow, which was soon used as a place of congregation such as worship and Sunday schools. The school started with a mix of 30 boys and girls as the first students with irregular attendance. As the school grew, Jones established a hut outside the Bungalow and created an all-worship Sunday school and proper classroom. In August 1897, the Welsh Mission had arranged a Khasi Christian, Rai Bahadur and his family from Khasi Hills, to help Jones, therefore the first enlisted congregation consisted of 6 Khasis in addition to Jones and his wife. Rai Bhajur took most of the classes as the teacher and remained in Aizawl for two years.

This organised congregation in 1898 is considered as the origin of church in Mizoram, and the establishment of Mission Veng Kohhran. An entirely separate church building was constructed only in 1913, at a place called Hriangmual bawlhmun (the current location of Mission Veng Church), which was an ancient altar of Sakhua worship.

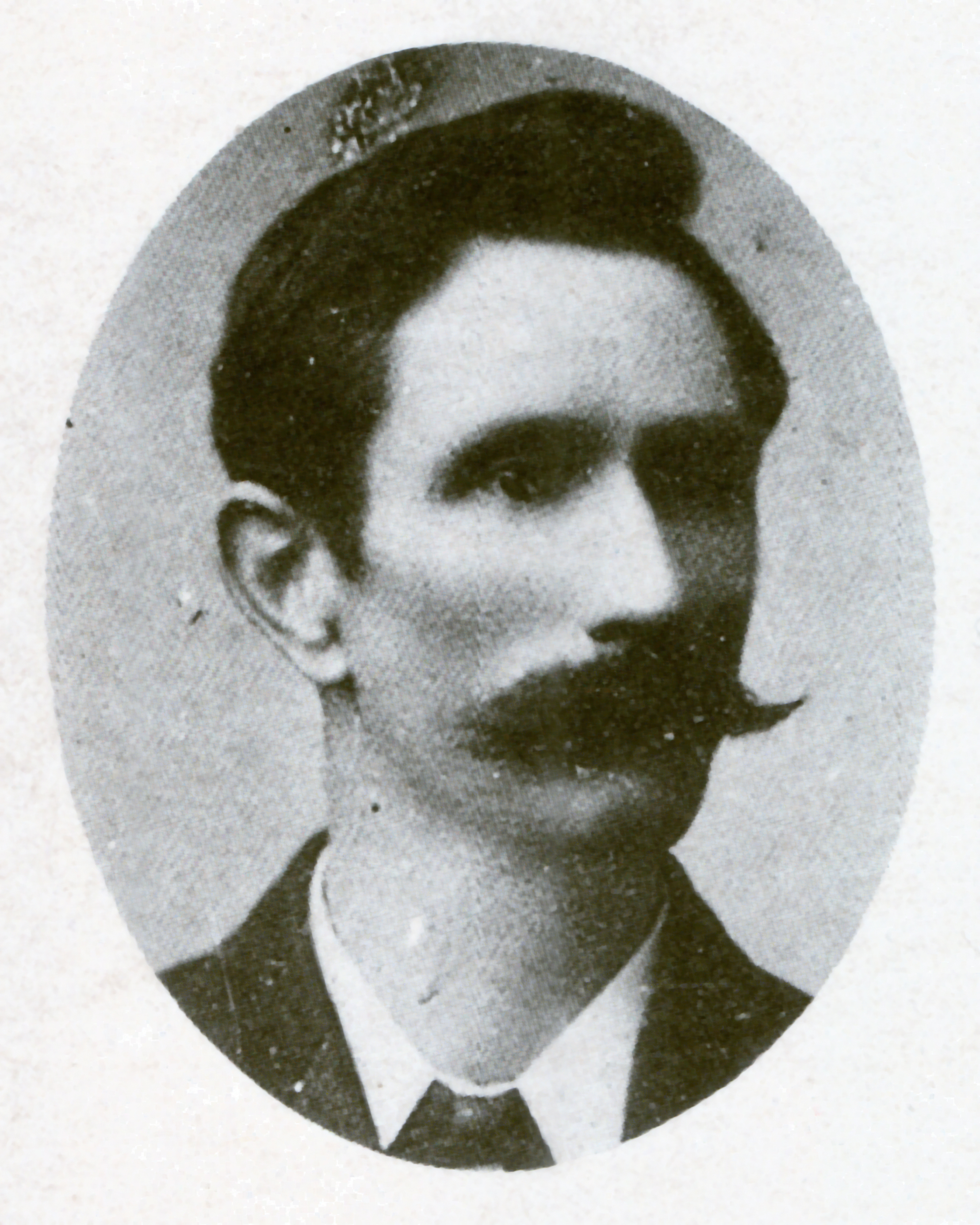
Edwin Rowlands

On the last day of 1898, Edwin Rowlands arrived in Mizoram. Jones met with Rowlands upon his arrival in Calcutta. Rowlands attempted to row the boat faster upstream on the river but fell overboard and was rescued. Jones and Rowlands worked together in evangelisation of the Mizo people. Rai Bhajur continued teaching and sought out villages to preach the gospel. Rai Bhajur however made the choice to leave Mizoram on the decision that Christianity must be consolidated among his own people in the Bhoi tribe. In Rai Bhajur's absence, Sahon Roy, a contractor for road works and bridle paths would travel across the Lushai Hills according to his work projects and preach the gospel to wayward villages.

Jones and Rowlands continued to make tours. One would remain in Aizawl while the other would preach with Mizo students and companions they had financially supported out of pocket for their education. The missionaries sowed suspicion among the Mizos with Christian theology and metaphors such as the "blood of Christ" which was understood as sorcery. Mizo individuals were also more or less curious about Western attire and accessories, more than focusing on the sermons being made. Rowlands once used a darkened house with a lit hearth to show that one's thoughts were plain to God, similarly to how they could spot an ant making a crossing on the hearth.

==== First baptism ====
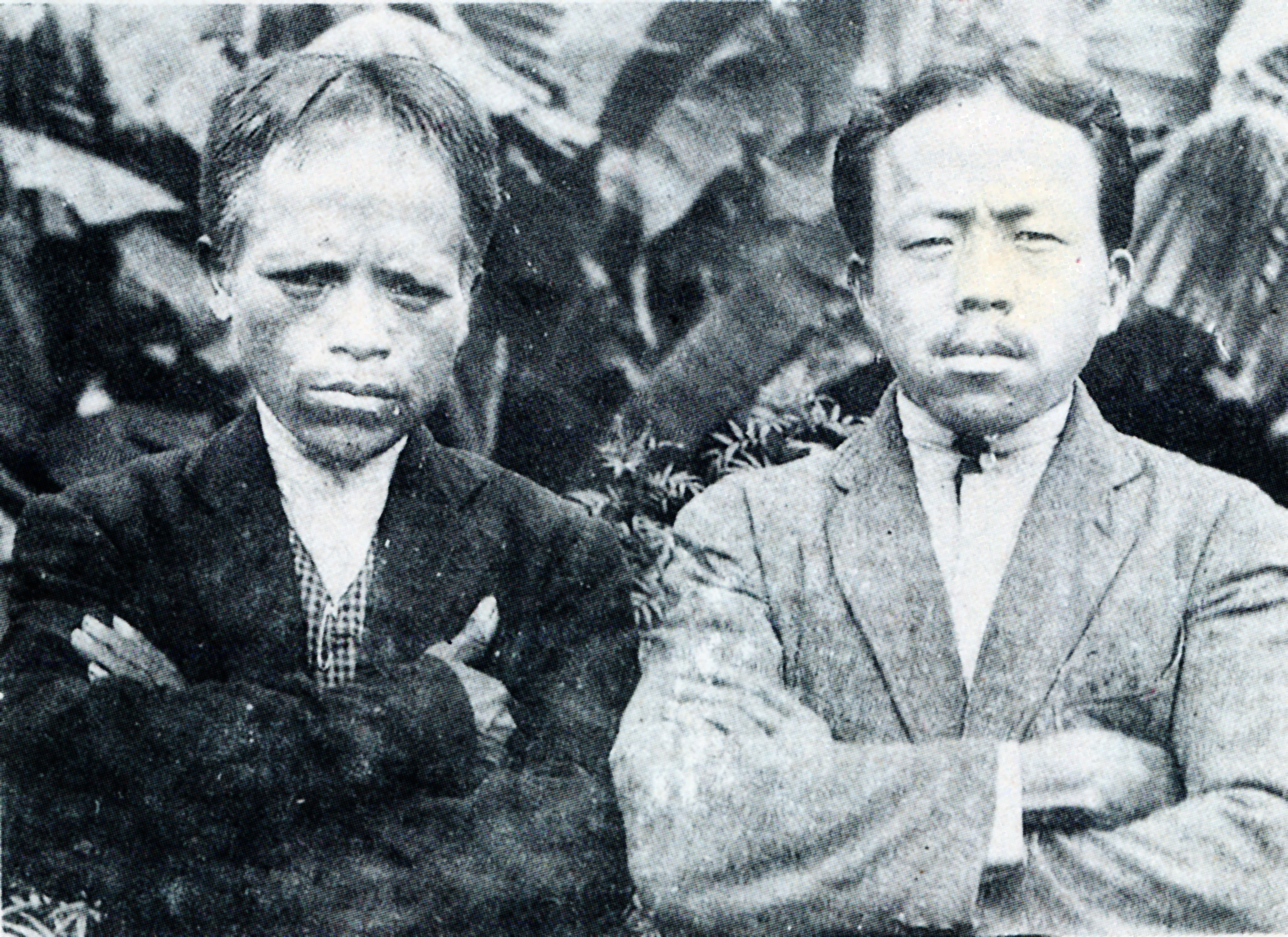
Khuma and presumed to be Khara or Duma, who were the first people to get baptized (25.7.1899)

Two young men named Khuma and Khara became the first fully converted Christians among the Mizos. Both of them begged for baptism. Khuma had been tutored under Lorrain and Savidge but initially showed no sign of apparent interest in the religion. But in 1898, he became more and more interested, and with his friend Khara, they were baptised by Jones on 25 July 1899. However, the first individuals to be baptised in Lushai Hills were two Khasis, who received baptism in mid-July. Khara was, however, not fully devoted and soon reverted to the old faith after getting into government service.

Khuma learnt to read and write and memorised several gospels. He went alone to the wildest areas of the Lushai Hills to spread the gospel. Khuma was persecuted by chiefs until he met a friend named Duma. Both of them would visit villages and stay at host's houses and ask if they had accepted the gospel. Khuma's efforts and exposure led to a tubular infection and he died on 23 August 1917.

In 1900, the first Mizos began to take on unaided tours to evangelize the other Mizos. The Mizo missionaries struggled to be respected as they were seen as vagrants and beggars. Social stigma furthermore prevented fathers from permitting non-Christian daughters to marry them. Khuma, Khara and Phaisama were the early three Mizo missionaries who reached as far as the Chin Hills. An early convert, Thanga, narrates that with Khuma, many non-Christian Mizos were suspicious of them stopping sacrifices for sicknesses, assuming that the British wished to kill them off by depriving their religion and faith-based healing.

==== Darphawka ====
Jones records of a gospel vision by a man named Darphawka. Before the British annexation, Darphawka and his family lived in a cave known as Pukpui (transl. big cave). They moved to Lungmawi (transl. prettys stone). Darphawka was said to have fallen in a trance for several days and experienced visions. He announced two great shining lights in the north and the south soon. This was seen as the two missions in northern Mizoram and southern Mizoram. The Baptists settled in the south and the Calvinistic Methodists in the north. Jones attempted to visit Darphawka only to realise he had died. Upon his visit, many villagers who heard of Darphawka's prophecy readied to accept Christianity, and his two daughters, Tlawmi and Khumi, were early converts in Mizo Christianity. Tlawmi and Khumi arrived in Aizawl and learnt of the gospel while attending school. They encouraged proselytisation but were persecuted by anti-Christian chiefs and their own brother.

==== Education ====
Due to the deployment of the Gurkha Regiment in Aizawl, many Mizo boys were employed as low unskilled labour in kitchens. Mizo boys from outer villages earned their keep and were known as "bêl nâwt boys". Many future Mizo church leaders were originally bêl nâwt boys. Education also spread as knowledge gained was voluntarily taught by Mizos to other Mizos. Those that had mastered the alphabet endeavoured to teach others and this further spread literacy in the population. As the Christian community grew, a Sunday School for adults was made.

Many school supplies were locally sourced with Mizos making their own rough seats and buildings for education. Equipment provided from the mission was also meagre and teacher salaries were low. The Aizawl school taught subjects which were basic to primary school and middle school. Girls attended in lower rates than boys and the school admitted both Christian and non-Christian converts. Rowlands who became known as Sapthara visited Chhingchhip and was encouraged to continue expanding schools across Mizoram. However he was struck with a case of typhoid fever and was rushed to Aizawl to recover at the superintendent's bungalow. In 1901, Jones sent out teacher to wayward villages in Mizoram and established them for three months where they were unpaid and fed by villagers in rice.

Rowlands decided to establish a permanent school at Khandaih village. Khandaih was run by Chief Vanphunga. Hranga was assigned the teacher for the school at Khandaih. The government school in Aizawl was closed as the mission schools became morepopular and the grant of ₹50 and government recognition was awarded. John Shakespear was in charge of arrangements. Major Granville Henry Loch donated ₹1,000 as a gift. The school was known as the "Red School" because the corrugated iron roofs were painted red. The church would continue building schools in villages above 100 households until 1952. Teachers salaries were also paid by the mission including materials such as brass gongs hung by the schools.

==== First church building ====
Christian Mizos followed the doctrine of the church which conflicted with the chiefs such as refusing to work on Sundays or refusal to produce Zû. Thankunga (son-in-law of Darphawka) was arrested and placed in Lunglei prison. This raised tensions as Christians demanded his charges to be rescinded. Jones intervened and requested that the government set him free. Thangkunga and several Christian Mizos left their villages and established a new village, Sethlun, with government permission. Sethlum began as a hamlet of 15 houses with a small chapel made of bamboo in 1902 being the first chapel in Mizoram.

Sethlun had no chief but Thankunga was effectively in charge of the settlement. The government considered making Thankunga the village chief but he turned it down to pursue being a pastor which he accomplished in 1915. In October 1901, Rowlands visited South Mizoram and settled in Pukpui, where he celebrated Christmas among the Mizos. He taught them two hymnns which had been translated into Mizo which became popular with new parents naming their children phrases of the hymnn in Mizo.

==== North and South denominations ====
However, with the coming of the Presbyterian missionaries and their establishment, the Baptist missionary with the Welsh mission, in 1901, agreed to divide the Lushai Hills into two separate fields and gave the southern part to Baptist Missionary Society (BMS) of London. The issue unfolded when Rowlands attempted to establish himself in Lunglei. The BMS was already established in Rangamati and Chittagong. Reverend George Hughes was instructed to go to Lunglei and enquire the permanent station of a missionary. Hughes made the visit and met many Christians and settled on evangelising the south Lushai Hills. Rowlands met with Hughes upon hearing of the visit and was convinced the BMS was taking over the southern half of Mizoram. Jones and Rowland wrote to the Presbyterian Church of Wales (PCW) to express disapproval of the plan and outlined the issues of a country that was divided into denominations. However, the home board had assumed the north and south were two different countries at the time the decision was made. The mission was suffering from the 1887 Assam earthquake and could not afford to reinforce missionaries to the Lushai Hills.

Rowlands discussed with the BMS and invited Lorraine and Savidge to be brought back to the Lushai Hills. BMS had received an inheritance from the will of Robert Arthington, and with that, they could manage the mission field of southern Lushai Hills. Their missionaries, Lorrain and Savidge, of the same Arthington mission workers, arrived in Lunglei in March 1903. They were greeted by some 125 Mizo Christians from Sethlun. They settled at Serkawn, and this Lunglei-annexed village became the eventual headquarters of the Baptist Church in Mizoram. Despite two dominations, the four missionaries cooperated well. Jones wrote a letter citing the need for denomiational unity to erode paganism. Rowlands himself who had worked in Texas was open to cooperation with other denominations and would be continued in his works in Manipur and Burma. Lorrain and Savidge had worked with the Welsh mission in Silchar and Aizawl before. Shakespear is also accredited with the cooperation of the four missionaries with joint meetings at his bungalow.

==== Scripture ====
The New Testament continued to be translated into the Mizo language and literature began to grow. In the north, the Mizo language's alphabet was adjusted and amended for efficiency and agreed with the south before becoming the standard vernacular. The word "Jihova" was the first term used to refer to Gods for the Mizos. However, Jihova was replaced by Pathian, the Mizo term for God. J was removed from Jisua and became Isua (Jesus) as there is no J in the Mizo alphabet. The alphabet succeeded in being easily taught and adapted to typewriters. Most books were sent away for printing, but the introduction of foot treadle platen machines would allow for literature to be printed locally in Mizoram. As literacy grew, the circulation of books in Mizoram grew.

The three books of the New Testament, Book of John, Book of Luke, Book of Acts, merged into one volume and became the most popular publication, with most Mizos purchasing them with hairpins or eggs in a barter system. Lorrain and Savidge's little hymnnbook also saw growth and expansion.

=== Lakher Pioneer Mission ===
The BMS could not still cover the extreme southern corner of Lushai Hills. Lorrain, therefore, urged his younger brother Reginald to start a mission work among the Mara people ("Lakher" to foreigners). Reginald Arthur Lorrain and his wife Maud founded the Lakher Pioneer Mission in London in 1905. They entered Maraland (now includes southern end of Mizoram and adjoining Chin State of Burma) and settled at Serkawr (Saikao) village on 26 September 1907. The Lorrains were refused financial support by missionary societies in England and were entirely financed by a fund-raising group based in Lorrain's home church at Penge. In the 1930s, additional finance came from Bruce Lorrain-Foxall's family and a church in Bridgnorth, Shropshire. With the additional fund few assistant missionaries joined the mission. By 1950 all Maras became converted.

As an independent and self-supported mission, the church had no official name until 1960, when Albert Bruce Lorrain Foxall, the son-in-law of R.A. Lorrain, gave the name "Lakher Independent Evangelical Church" at a conference on 26 March. "Lakher" was replaced by "Mara" at the General Assembly in 1967. After administrative separation of India and Burma in 1947–1948, Maraland was split and the Mara church got divided accordingly. The Indian counterpart became Evangelical Church of Maraland. Mara Independent Evangelical Church then faced administrative break up in 1970, to be reconciled only in 1987. The unified church became Mara Evangelical Church.

=== Mizo Revival of 1906 ===
The Christian Revivalism movement, which started in Wales (1904–1905 Welsh revival), arrived in the Khasi Hills in 1905. In March 1906, Jones and Lorraine sent a delegation to the Khasi Hills assembly, which had been hosted by a prominent Khasi Christian chief, Kinesingh, with free food for the assembly for three days. The delegates were Chawnga, Khuma, Thanga, Pawngi, Thangkungi, Vanchhunga and Siniboni from Northern Mizoram and Thangkunga, Parima and Zathanga from Southern Mizoram.

The delegation reached Mairang where at the prayer session the Mizos delegates began to experience themselves with the revivalism. On the final day, Sunday, an 8000-person congregation was held for the Mizo delegation to bless them.

At Aizawl, the former delegates attempted to spark the revival in the school chapel buildings without success. However, on Sunday before the southern delegates were to leave for Serkawn, they held a prayer and stated the farewell hymn "God be with you till we meet again". The hymn continued to be repeated with more individuals joining them. The school children also joined them upon arriving for classes. The meeting lasted hours with prayers made for others and hymns starting anew in choirs. One woman, Hlunziki, stood up and confessed her sins and asked for prayers on her behalf. All individuals, including the children, began to approach the front and confess their sins. People from the two closest villages arrived and it continued until they were forced to continue to dissemble for dinner.

However, the success led to persecution from Chief Vanphunga who saw it as a threat to his chieftainship and the dissolution of the institution of the zawlbûk. Jones visited Vanphunga's village of Khandaih and attempted baptisms before being disrupted with burning embers thrown at him and chased. The next day he was able to continue his progress and baptize 30 new converts with no interruption.

Chiefs would persecute Christians by forcing them to work on Sundays, produce or fearfully make them consume zû, dispossess property rights, grant bad farming plots, falsify fines, exhort provisions, beating, cold water on winter nights and public humiliation of women being unclothed.

Vanphunga who expelled Christians were forced to accept them on government intervention. However, continued persecution encouraged them to move out to other villages. This spread Christianity further and the revival movement maintained varying intensities until the Mizo Revival of 1913.

In response to the revival, the chiefs initiated the Puma Zai movement. Chief Lalzika with Liangkaia visited the village of Ratu and learnt the song, and hosted feasts and banquets of food, which popularised the song. Eventually, the song became rebranded as Tlangnam Zai (transl. community dance).

=== Famine ===
In 1911, the mautam famine struck the Lushai Hills. The bamboo trees flowered, and despite promising harvests, the rat population overran the rice fields of the villages. Attempts were made to mitigate the rat population via traps, fences, and bounties on rats. Villagers took to the jungle roots and began to forage for other food supplies. People had to dig 4–10 feet deep in stony soil to find wild yam or nothing. The famine prompted many Mizos to leave their villages, with some migrating as far as the neighbouring territories of Tripura, Manipur, or Western Burma. Individuals began to die of starvation and malnutrition. Missionaries noted that children were the last to suffer as both Christian and non-Christian parents prioritised feeding them first. The Welsh Churches began to gift and donate to Mizoram, where Peter Fraser and D.E. Jones distributed the relief. Jones' dining room in his new bungalow was converted into a storeroom of rice purchased from the plains of Assam. Missionaries in Silchar and Karimganj both supported the relief efforts. The Government of India set up two centres for rice distribution, which attracted individuals from all across Mizoram to make the journey for aid. The northern centre was in Tipaimukh and Saitang, while the southern centre was in Demagiri. The rice, however, was not free but required to be purchased, which led to many individuals taking on debts. Villagers who were protected from rats via river loops managed to protect their food stocks. Lloyd notes that in the pre-colonial era, this would lead to conflict and raids, but under the British, the well-off villages shared in the spirit of Christian compassion. However, the famine led to cholera outbreaks, which led to a significant number of deaths as a result. The puma zai movement was weakened as a result of the famine and its impoverishment. The zû and the feasts were withheld. However, tlangnam zai was still more popular than Christian preachings.

The Christian Mizos attempted to preach outside of rice depots to those encamped waiting for rice. Saithanga argues that the absence of zû made them open to Christianity. The mission also employed people in building, roadmaking, jungle cutting and gardening to pay off debts while gifting those who could not work with bags of rice. Peter Fraser also established the Lushai Famine Fund to alleviate the plight of orphans and destitute individuals facing starvation. These efforts made Christianity attractive to many individuals.

=== Bawi abolition ===
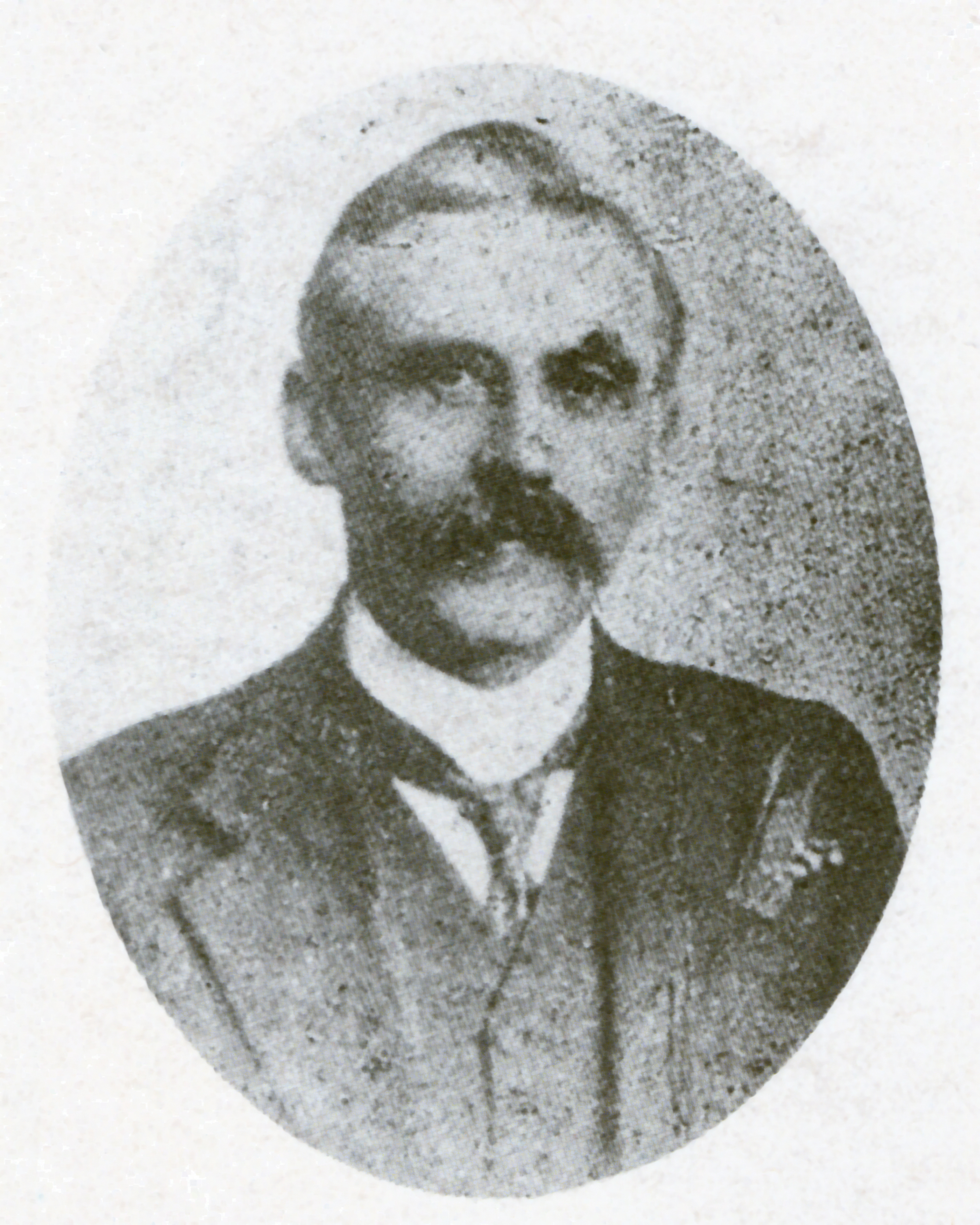
Rev. Dr. Peter Fraser, who campaigned to abolish the bawi system

Despite the circumstances of bawis, they were freed by Edwin Rowlands and Chief Hrangvunga. Many missionaries, however, were wary of interfering with the Bawi system and believed that the development of conscience among the Mizos would make it naturally redundant and eventually abolished. Fraser disagreed with this view and investigated the matter personally. Fraser believed that the system would not be tolerated if the British people were aware and would make an effort to do away with it. When the Christian Chief Khawvelthanga released his slaves in October 1909, he apprised the superintendent to make sure they won't be reenslaved by other chiefs. The superintendent approved on the condition that they would be slaves in other villages and would have to pay a ransom for each slave if another chief had claimed them.

Fraser sided with the slave freeing chiefs, while Superintendent H.W.G. Cole sided with other chiefs in preserving traditional culture. The government, in response, published in the newspaper that the Bawi system was not slavery but indentured labour. Fraser succeeded in convincing other missionaries to support the abolition of the bawi system. Fraser, in a letter to Cole, stated that no slave system was legal under the British Empire and, for this reason, petitioned for its abolition. Jones carried out an investigation and corroborated that the system was, in fact, oppressive. The missionaries had previously believed it to be a system of looking after the poor and destitute, but changed their minds with Fraser's efforts. Fraser, however, differed with them by arguing for immediate abolition, while the rest of the missionaries argued for gradual abolition. Other missionaries held the belief that if their missions got politically involved, they might be expelled from Mizoram.

Fraser began to circulate postcards of his family and the chiefs supporting him such as Khawvelthanga in Wales which raised support for his campaign. Fraser wrote a memorandum to King George V and sent letters to parliament and issued a press release on the issue. As a result, Cole granted an ultimatum that Fraser could only stay in the Lushai Hills if he agreed to only render himself to medical work and not involve himself in the controversy any further. Fraser refused and refuted that he feared the Church of Christ would become infamous for upholding slavery. Fraser's health worsened and he left Mizoram on 26 October 1912 to Britain. The Governor of Assam reformed the system by abolishing the term bawi and allowed them to leave their chiefs on their own will thus not allowing chiefs to forcefully retain them. The ransom system was maintained. Shortly after, Cole was removed despite being an effective administrator with market reforms, introduction of the potato crop, poultry farming, rubber plantations and other economic endeavours. A Puma Zai was composed for Cole on his departure.

=== Mizo Revival of 1913 ===
The 1913 Mizo Revival began at Bupawla Veng with a congregation of Church delegates. The followers were forbidden to read the Bible and encouraged to encounter the Holy Ghost within themselves. The Revival grew numbers as it spread in the northern region of Mizoram across 21 prominent villages. It slowed down in Western Mizoram due to weak communication and little Christian influence.

The 1913 Revival introduce indigenous interpretation of Christianity. One incident recounts a woman named Nui who taught her followers to pray to the Cross instead of Jesus. She further declared prophecies about the Second Coming of Christ. Another was a group formed by Tlira who had divine visions and wrote several books on his visions. Tlira's teachings deviated from the Church. The Church excommunicated Tlira and his group in 1914 by terming his actions as those of a false prophet.

=== Mizo Revival of 1919 ===
The Mizo Revival of 1919 began on 26 July 1919 in three separate villages independently. The villages were Zotlang and Thingsai in the southern Mizoram district, and Nisapui in the northern Mizoram district. This happened despite the vast distance and lack of connection between the villages at the time they emerged in the revival spirit.

At Nisapui, four women praying in a house experienced the stirring and intensification on the next day, on Sunday, drawing individuals from neighbouring villages. The crowd at Nisapui marched to Lungdai to Durtlang to Mission Veng in Aizawl. The Zotlang revival began with a recital of the hymn "I'm not ashamed to own my Lord". The Zotlang revival spread to Pukpui and Theiriat. The events at Thingsai were not recorded as the revival spirit had become too intense and chaotic for anyone to systematically recount the phenomenon.

During the revival, the Mizo branch of the Salvation Army, founded by Kawlkhuma, launched a (Beirual meiling, 'fiery campaign') and converted the first Chief, Lalthima of Tlanpui, to the denomination in March 1922 before Kawlkhuma was recalled to Calcutta and the Salvation Army was given to the Welsh Mission.

Authors such as James Dokhuma contend that the Revival of 1919 led to the emergence of the Roman Catholic Church in Mizoram. Saiaithanga argues that Catholic scripture challenged the discontent of the Mission Church in Mizoram. In 1922, two texts of the Catholic denomination were given to Aichhunga in Shillong whose cousin Thangphunga went to found the Catholic Church in Mizoram in 1925.

=== Kelkang Revival ===
Thanghnuaia, a Ralte preacher, visited Kelkang for family matters and resided there temporarily. He began to speak in tongues. Thanghnuaia grew in popularity and shared his considerable popularity and influence with Thangzinga and Pasina according to Chief Liannawla. The people of Kelkang stopped working on their jhums, believing that rice would rain out of the sky. Children also began to stop attending school, and Superintendent Anthony Gilchrist McCall believed the Mission had lost control of the revival movement.

Thangzinga began to proclaim holy visions in bed. Pasina furthermore began to make predictions and prohpecies that would unfold. The Kelkang Pastor, P.D. Sena confronted Thanghnuaia and accused him of manipulation. The Chief of Kelkang attempted to expel him three times but he kept returning.

The Chief of Kelkang sent his Upa Lianhranga to McCall, citing that the movement was spreading fast and out of control. McCall left with an escort of Gurka filement on 4 September to Kelkang. A plot was uncovered to ambush McCall. McCall arrived at Kelkang and arrested Thanghnuaia, Thangzinga and Pasina. McCall sentenced the three men to three years in Sylhet before the Governor of Assam awarded clemency one year into the imprisonment on the condition that they refrain from public worship and preaching. The villagers of Kelkang were heavily fined and put to work as coolies.

=== World War Two ===
With the growth of Christianity, ordinations began to slow down, and the mission began to invest less by closing local training of the pastoral community. In Durtlang, the missionary Samuel Davies was assigned, where Chief Lalsuaka was still ruling. A hospital had been built in Durtlang with the theological school and moved out. There were initial retentions of staff that led to there being no mission doctor. Sam Davies was moved to Aizawl soon after David Edward, honorary inspector of schools, was fired on furlough in 1938. Continuing from Edward's schemes, Davies withheld some more extreme programmes. Davies was made to manage the issue of underpaid teacher salaries, the rise of cost of living due to the war in Europe and disturbances in the Second Sino-Japanese War. Many educated men willing to become teachers were instead conscripted into the military.

Before the outbreak of World War Two, the Governor of Assam, Robert Neil Reid, made a visit to Aizawl with his wife. He inspected the standard of institutions such as government administrations and the church mission. Reid promised the mission that the government would not take over the mission schools. After the visit, plans were drawn up for a new theological college in Aizawl, but they were shelved due to the diversion of funds to build hospital water tanks in Durtlang. The mission also planned a new building for the girls' school. A government grant was promised on condition of a domestic science room, which Sam Davies committed to completing. It was finished in February 1940, but was occupied by Allied forces stationed in Aizawl for the Japanese frontier.

Superintendent A.G. McCall supported the war effort and intended to align the influence of the Church to the same effect. Due to this, he clashed with Lewis Mendus and his wife, the most influential missionaries after D.E. Jones. Mendus and his wife maintained a pacifist outlook and would only support the effort through the Red Cross organisation and medical service for combatants. Mendus' main concern was the transformation of churches into conscription centres. Lloyd argues that while the Mizos were ambivalent to pacifism or intervention, the capture of Mizo soldiers in Burma and the suffering as prisoners likely made them averse to a pacifist outlook. Mendus, who was scheduled to return to the United Kingdom, failed to do so on account of no berths for civilians being available. In 1943, with the Japanese fighting in India, the roads of Aizawl were rapidly upgraded for jeep truck logistics to be possible. The stationing of soldiers and the Royal Air Force oversaw many of them attending Mizo services in the Church, and some helped in Sunday Schools.

The Church's slow growth picked up as money began to accumulate in Mizo hands from foreign soldiers and thus circulated into the church treasuries. Conscripted Mizo soldiers furthermore sent their income home as well, which further increased the resources of local churches. In 1944, the Mizos held the Jubilee of the 50th anniversary of Lorrain and Savidge's arrival in Mizoram. Lorraine, who was severely ill, sent a message of goodwill and thanks for the Gospel. D.E. Jones congratulated the Mizos church and made an announcement on the British Broadcasting Corporation Radio station in Wales.

With the possibility of a Japanese invasion into Mizoram, the government distributed firearms to the Mizos and paid men stipends of ₹2 monthly. This money was collectively pooled towards a desire by local leaders to build the first high school in Mizoram. Evacuation plans were made for white civilians to leave Mizoram if it were to be invaded or occupied. However, the foreign missionaries stationed in Mizoram refused to comply. Davies moved to Shillong before going back, while most missionaries stayed in either Durtlang or Aizawl. In 1944, Lewis Mendus and his wife, Gwen Mendus, retired. They boarded a secured passage to South Africa.

Furthermore, the army's effort to upgrade the roads of Mizoram for logistics brought change to Mizo society. The road stretched from the mission hospital in Durtlang and followed the bridle path until it hit a stone opening that could not be widened. This led to a detour where another opening was carved out of the mountain. The military encamped at Aizawl during this stay and volunteered at the mission hospital. The road opened up trade, and surplus logistics were given to Christian Mizo traders. The increase in money in the Mizo population allowed parents to send their children for long-term education and attend the new high school upon its opening. In 1944, Gwen Rees Roberts and J. Meirion Lloyd arrived as missionaries. Roberts took over the Girls' Middle English School, and Lloyd was assigned to the new high school.

==== Contemporary era ====
The increase in education led to an increase in demand for literature. High literacy also meant that literature outside of religious scripture began to see demand. Sam Davies took over the Press after Mendus' retirement and imported a new press to replace the old Loch Press, which was outdated and inefficient for the growing mass media in Mizoram. He collected funds and improved the Loch Press while the imported press turned out to be unsuitable. Paper would be imported from Burma and carried via Oxen carts to Aizawl. Paper was further imported from South India.

The first high school was established with two full-time teachers. As the military presence left, more classes were added in the vacant buildings. Many male students disappeared from attendance in 1945 as the military continued to recruit more men. The Assam Government paid ₹10 to students to cover food costs as stipends. The high school also began its own jhum to cultivate food at the suggestion of Mizo staff to build up vocational skills and respect ancestral customs. The jhum programme continued for two years with success before it was removed from the programme due to rapid growth of attendance and enrolment. The land for jhumming was reallocated as a result. Superintendent A.R.H. MacDonald establish J.M. Lloyd as the headmaster and formed a committee with himself as chairman and Lloyd as secretary. The rest of the committee consisted of village chiefs and members of the public. The committee managed the school affairs until the high school entered the provincial system. MacDonald secured the tea garden hill which was informally owned by the Assam Rifles and secured it as a permanent school site. The site was also revered as being the location of the first three missionaries and Savidge opening the first school. The site was renamed MacDonald Hill as a tribute to him.

In February 1949, after a painful illness, Pastor Chhuahkhama died, which impacted the Mizo church heavily. In October 1949, Lewis Mendus visited Aizawl with his wife for an India-wide assessment of missionary activity. Mendus cut the new ribbon for the newly constructed road. A North-South Conference was held between the Presbyterian and Baptist Missionaries. The translation of the Bible into Mizo was discussed, which was predicted to be finished by 1953. The Hla Bu (transl. hymn book) was also revised. Proposals to establish a united north–south theological school were also raised but were rejected on practical considerations. The Baptists brought up the need for Church unity between the North and South of Mizoram. Gwen Mendus wrote an unpublished article articulating the importance of a unified Church with the introduction of British and American denominational missionaries in India. However, most of the conference resolutions fail to come to fruition. Lloyd states that this cemented the denominational rivalry of Mizoram.

In 1951, the government assumed control of the high school. The Synod thus established theological training in Aizawl. The curriculum was established and based on the Licentiate of Theology (L.Th). The theological school was combined with the Teacher's Training School. The Theological Education Fund of India was established and granted money for books to expand the library in Mizoram. The World Council of Churches also provided post-graduate scholarships for Mizo students to study abroad. The Bangalore Conference of 1964 for Theological Education promised aid in publishing a theology series in Mizo. The promise was fulfilled through works on the Church, devotion, the geography of Palestine, the history of the Mizo Church, and other subjects.

However, the theological college needed a permanent location. As a result, a site at Mission Veng was chosen. Every week during the school term, both the theology and teaching school students went to work on the construction of the building. The rock at the site was cut up. The goal to finish by 1963 was not fulfilled, so a mechanical digger was employed instead.

The Theological School became a college in 1965 and, in 1971, was recognised as offering a Bachelor of Theology standard. The school established a mobile school using a private vehicle to teach in areas further away from Aizawl. The school was opened to women. This was to help the workers of the Christian Family Movement and support the handful of Rice Collection. Zomuani Gaikwad was an early student and became the first woman B.D. in 1977.

== Influence of Christianity ==
=== Education ===
The first government school in the Lushai Hills was approved by the Chief Commissioner of Assam in 1897 to recruit government workers. A. Porteus, the political commissioner of the South Lushai Hills, saw literacy for the Mizo people as useful for constables, peons and the like. Education was quickly placed into the responsibility of missionaries as British administrators saw this policy as cheap and convenient for cultivating administrative goals. Mission schools were small and were started early in 1898 by Welsh missionary D.E. Jones, whose students subsequently opened three more schools in 1901. Graduates of mission schools continued to open rural schools and propagate education as a result. In the South Lushai Hills, Baptist missionaries also focused on increasing literacy and education for adults by constructing rest houses. Staying in the rest houses was free, alongside lessons and sermons. In the North Lushai Hills, Welsh missionaries tended to establish Sunday schools that taught the alphabet alongside religious education from the Bible.

The opportunities presented by education also allowed for social mobility. While Mizo girls did attend mission schools, they mostly focused on handicrafts and domestic responsibilities, which became unpopular with parents. Many families instead sent their sons to associate with missionaries as a means to secure employment in government jobs. The demand for schooling increased to the point that schools in Aizawl and Lunglei were turning away prospective pupils. High school and tertiary education, however, was out of state in places such as Shillong, limiting the emergence of a new elite class in Mizo society. With the emergence of literate communities, the demand for reading increased, prompting missionaries to publish and print early Mizo language biblical translations, songbooks, manuals, and textbooks, numbering as many as 143 different volumes.

== Other denominations ==
1. Salvation Army was formally established on 26 April 1917 by Kawl Khuma. Khuma was a young Christian preacher. He was inspired by a military system of organisation. When he was introduced to a Salvation Army officer Booth-Tucker at Shimla, he was soon converted. He went for formal training at Bombay. In 1917 he became the first commissioned officer in India and started his mission at Aizawl, and called it Chhandama Sipai. India Eastern became a separate command on 1 June 1991 and became a territory in 1993.
2. Catholicism arrived in Mizoram in 1925. In a brief visit from Chittagong, Father Boulay, CSC, baptised two infants on 6 December 1925 which marked the beginning of Catholicism in the state. However, early opposition arose from Protestants, and as a result, the first Catholic church came up only in 1947. With permission from the Governor of Assam, two Canadian Holy Cross Fathers Fr. George Breen, CSC, and Bro. Gilbert, CSC, arrived in Mizoram on 15 April 1947. They established their headquarters at Kulikawn.
3. United Pentecostal Church (UPC) emerged as an offshoot of the great spiritual revival in the 1930s, which resulted in many highly spiritualised Mizos seeking a more flexible church, particularly unsatisfied with the strictly Welsh-influenced system. Led by Zakamlova, a separate congregation was organised in Aizawl, but they lacked any denominational support. After several attempts to contact international missions, they established an "Apostolic Church" in 1948 with moral support from the Apostolic Church of Pentecost in the United States. The first church was opened at Lungleng Vawkzawn village in October. However, Zakamlova knew the need to get full affiliation, so he contacted Pentecostal Assemblies of the World worker Roxie A.R. Telie Dover, who was stationed at Bhagalpur. Upon invitation, Dover visited Aizawl on 16 January 1949. Learning their enthusiasm and doctrinal inclination, Dover suggested they join the UPC. After getting government permission, Rev E.L. Scisma inaugurated UPC on 19 February 1950.
4. Seventh-day Adventist arrived in 1946. It was initiated by Lallianzuala Sailo, who first made contact with the Seventh-day Adventist Church at Shillong in Meghalaya in November 1946. OW Lange was the first Adventist missionary to Mizoram.

== Indigenous churches ==
Mass conversion within half a century and frequent bursts of revivals among Mizos led to the births of numerous indigenous denominations of Christianity in Mizoram found nowhere else. With extant and existing types there are more than three dozen independent churches throughout Mizoram. The reason largely being a reciprocal revival of cultural values which were strongly opposed by the founding missions. Some notable ones in terms of stronghold and popularity are:

1. Lalpa Kohhran Thar (The Lord's New Church), but more famously known as Chana Pawl or Ziona Pawl, was founded by Chana's brother Khuangtuaha in 1942. The extraordinary practice is polygamy of the head of the church. Chana had 30 wives. His eldest son and successor (after his death in 1997) Ziona has 39 wives and over 90 children. The church is somewhat a form of pater familias as the head is revered as supreme leader. The church itself holds a world record of the World Record Academy for being the "biggest family in the world" in 2011. They are concentrated at Baktawng village.
2. Isua Krista Kohhran (Church of Jesus Christ) was started on 23 May 1970 at Bualpui NG village. A rival sister Isua Krista Kohhran Mizoram split out on 6 April 1977. The church is spread all over Mizoram and also in parts of Tripura, Bangladesh and Burma.
3. Kohhran Thianghlim (Holy Church) was founded by a veterinary doctor L.B. Sailo in 1984. It is headquartered at Chawlhhmun, Aizawl, with its notable Solomon's Temple.
4. Nunna Lalchhungkua was founded by evangelist Rorelliana on 27 September 1978.

== See also ==
- History of Mizoram
- Baptist Church of Mizoram
- Mizoram Presbyterian Church
- Mizo Conference of Seventh-day Adventist
- Roman Catholic Diocese of Aizawl
- Evangelical Church of Maraland

== Sources ==
- Lloyd, J. Meirion (1991). History of the Church in Mizoram: Harvest in the Hills. Synod Publication Board. pp. 17–23.
- McCall, Anthony Gilchrist (1949). Lushai Chrysalis. London: Luzac.
- Sangkima (2004). Essays on the History of the Mizos. Guwahati: Spectrum Publications. ISBN 81-87502-77-0.
- James Dokhuma (1975). Zoram kohhran tualto chanchinte. D. Buanga, 122 pages
- Chhangte Lal Hminga (1987). The Life and Witness of the Churches in Mizoram. Literature Committee, Baptist Church of Mizoram, pages 365.
- Mangkhosat Kipgen (1997). Christianity and Mizo culture: the encounter between Christianity and Zo culture in Mizoram. Mizo Theol. Conference, pages 359.
- Liangkhaia. Kohhran Hrang Hrang Chanchin. L.T.L Publications, pages 122.
- Liangkhaia (1976). Mizo chanchin. Mizo Academy of Letters, pages147.
- Lalsangkima Pachuau (2002). Ethnic Identity and Christianity: A Socio-Historical and Missiological Study of Christianity in Northeast India with Special Reference to Mizoram. Peter Lang Pub Incorporated, pages 205. ISBN 9783631394717
- Reginald Arthur Lorrain (1920). The Wonderful Story of the Lakher Pioneer Mission: Founded on Prayer, Launched in Faith, February 11th, 1905, Evangelical & Inter-denominational. Lakher Pioneer Mission, pages 27 (BiblioBazaar, 2010 edition. ISBN 9781177284585)
- Reginald Arthur Lorrain (1912). Five years in unknown jungles. Lakher Pioneer Mission, 274 pages
- Saiaithanga (1969). Mizo kohhran chanchin. Regional Theological Literature Committee, 168 pages
- J.V. Hluna (1985). Church & political upheaval in Mizoram: a study of impact of Christianity on the political development in Mizoram. Mizo History Association, 196 pages
- V.L. Zaikima (2011). Lalpa kohhran thar: khuangtuaha pâwl-châna pâwl. Lengchhawn Press, 136 pages
- Vanlalchhuanawma (2007). Christianity and Subaltern Cuture: Revival Movement as a Cultural Response to Westernisation in Mizoram. Delhi: Indian Society for Promoting Christian Knowledge. ISBN 978-81-7214-901-7.
