= William Williams (missionary) =

Welsh missionary (1859–1892)

The Reverend William Williams
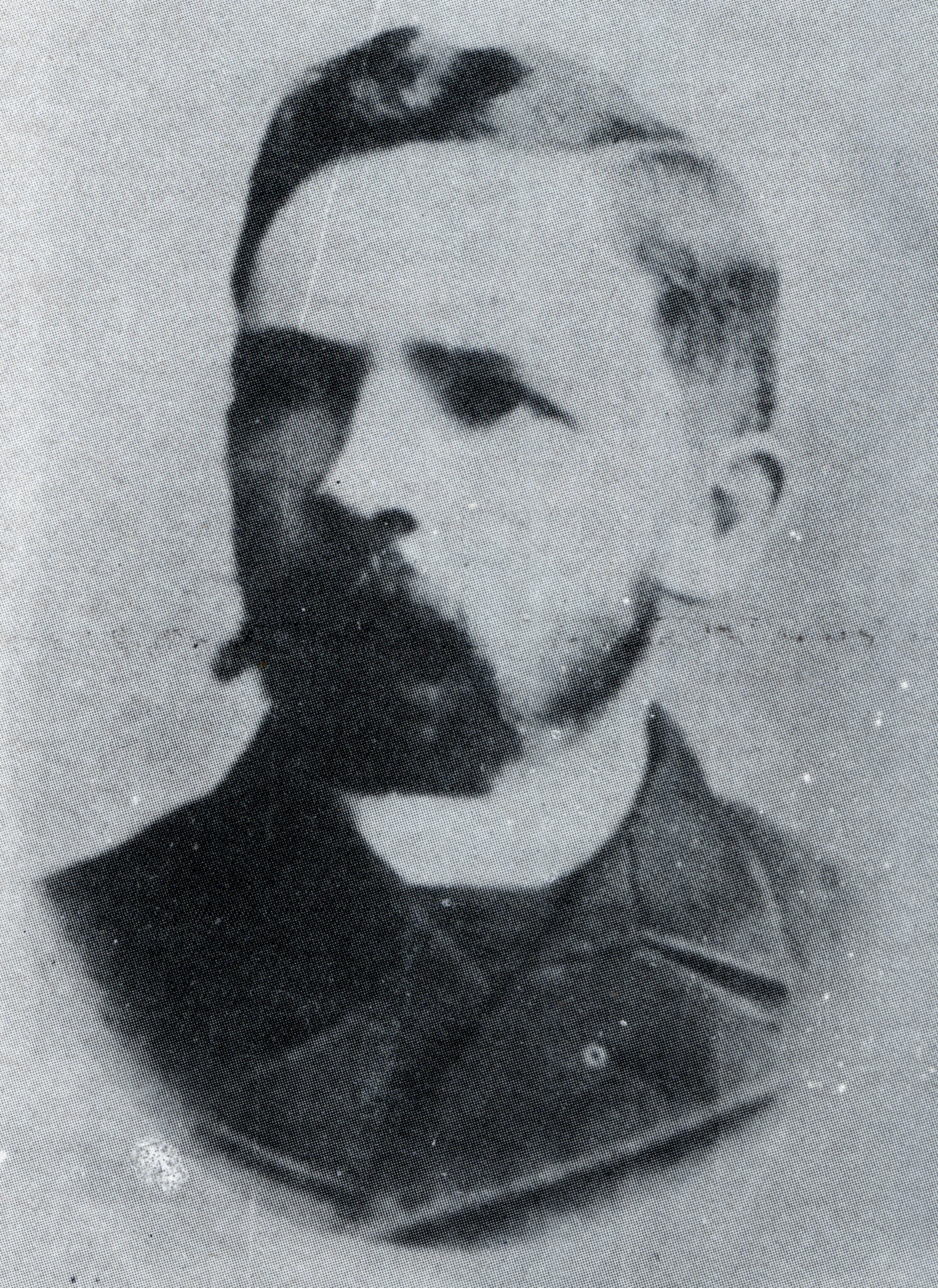
- Born: 11 February 1859; Nanternis, Ceredigion, Wales
- Died: 21 April 1892 (aged 33); Mawphlang, Meghalaya, India
- Education: BTh, Harley College
- Occupation: Christian missionary
- Known for: Christianity in Meghalaya; Christianity in Mizoram

William Williams (11 February 1859 – 22 April 1892) was a Welsh Presbyterian missionary to Khasi Hills, northeast India, in the late 19th century. He was a son of a ship captain in Nanternis, a small village in Wales. Following his father's footstep he became a sailor for five years. Then he took a profession in carpentry for two years. After graduating in theology from East London Missionary Training Institute (now Cliff College) he became a pastor. Pursuing his ambition he became a missionary of the Welsh Calvinistic Methodist Foreign Mission to Khasi people in India from 1887 until his death. He died of typhoid in 1892.

The date of his arrival, 15 March, in Mizoram is adopted as "Chanchin Tha Thlen Ni" by the Mizoram Presbyterian Church in its 89th General Assembly in 2012.

== Early life and education ==
William Williams was born in Nanternis, a small village near New Quay, the son of Daniel and Elizabeth Williams. His father was a ship captain. He was educated at Capel Neuadd, Calvinistic Chapel at Nanternis, till he was twelve years of age. The chapel was under the pastoral of Rev. William Lewis. At age twelve he followed his father's profession at sea to work as crew member. Once in the River Clyde a fierce gale buffeted their boat, which was completely wrecked. Out of fear and feeling of providence for narrow escape, he became devoted to religion. In 1876 he gave up life at sea and got an apprenticeship in carpentry. Finding time to read Bible, he became engrossed in theology. At age nineteen in 1878 he entered a preparatory Grammar School in New Quay, and then continued at Llandysul. At Llandysul he received scholarship for a term to enter University College of Wales, Aberystwyth. After completion of the term, he moved to London to join East London Missionary Training Institute (more popularly known as Harley College, and which became Cliff College). He graduated at age 27 in 1886.

== Career ==
William Williams received an invitation as pastor of Calvinistic Methodist (now officially Presbyterian Church of Wales) in Llantwit Major, a small town in South Wales. He was ordained at an Association in Trecastle in Mid Wales in August 1886. Before he completed one year of pastoral service he found an opportunity to join missionary work in Khasi Hills in northeast India under the Welsh Calvinistic Methodist Foreign Mission, which was headquartered in Liverpool. He embarked for India on 28 September 1887 at Liverpool port, in the company of seven other missionaries. He worked among the Khasi people in Shella, a town in East Khasi Hills. He was an ardent evangelist, learning Khasi language, composing hymns in Khasi, and travelling on foot to remote villages.

Williams composed several hymns in Khasi, and a rather good singer, Khasis gave him an epithet "the sweet singer of Wales." As an editor he published a quarterly journal U Nongkit Khubor (Khasi for The Messenger) in 1889, the first periodical in Khasi language.

== Visit to Mizoram and death ==
Although Williams was a missionary among Khasis, his most historically notable work was his visit to Mizoram (was then Lushai Hills). The Mizos had never been visited by any foreigner (except for punitive British military expeditions in 1881 and 1889 to subjugate tribal warfare and raids on British plantations, which eventually led to British rule of Lushai Hills). In early 1891 Williams met Mizo prisoners, the tribal chiefs, at Sylhet jail who were imprisoned after their defeat in the British expedition. Curious of their unexplored life and fertile land for mission work, he sent information of his plan to Revd Josiah Thomas, Mission Secretary at Liverpool, on 7 February 1891, as below:

I am sending you a letter which I received from Major Maxwell, the Deputy Commissioner at Silchar. It was sent in answer to a letter of mine, enquiring about Lushai, the distance, and the way etc. and in which I said that I have been possessed for several months with a very strong desire to go and work amongst the Lushais as a missionary. The Gospel is the only power in the world that will bring peace amongst them. If it is not God's will that I shall go may He take away the desire and put it in someone else's heart.

His plea was approved by the Shella Presbytery on 15 February. He left Shella on 18 February (Wednesday) and spent the following Sunday at Sylhet. He met Benjamin Aitken, an elder of Free Church of Scotland and sub-editor of Calcutta-based newspaper The Englishman, who volunteered to join him in his expedition. His frequent companion Kasinath, a young Assamese Christian who was preaching that afternoon, and one Khasi Christian U Khanai also joined him. On Monday 23 February the four set sail on a boat on Surma River, preaching to people along their journey. They spent Sunday 1 March at Silchar and moved the next day. On the third day they arrived at Jhalnacherra and spent a night at Alexandrapur tea garden where Mary Winchester was kidnapped by Mizo Warriors in 1871, the origin of British encounter with Mizos. On Thursday they continued their journey and after a week on Tlawng River, they reach Guturmukh (Kutbûl Kai in Mizo), a British telegraph station at the Tut River junction, on 11 March. Here they stayed for four days and saw the first thatched huts of Mizos at a distant hill top, including stockades used during the British military expedition. On Sunday 15 March afternoon they met roaming native Mizos for the first time in their boat ride. They were friendly boys between 10 and 15 years old from neighbouring village, Liankunga chiefdom. They exchanged salt and tobacco for the boys' yams and bananas. They gave them some boxes of matches, and Bible pictures. They also sang several songs to them which they "listened with their mouths open." On Monday afternoon they arrived at Changsil, where they camped among the military escort commanded by Captain Williamson. With the army they moved on Thursday to Sairang where they spent the night. Army horses arrived in the next morning and they headed for Aizawl ("Fort Aijal" as it was called). They reached Aizawl at noon on 20 March. They stayed there for four weeks, learning about Mizo lifestyle, distributing Bible pictures and preaching among non-Mizo such as Khasi, Manipuri, and Naga workers stationed there. Full of hope to return and start formal education and evangelism, they left Aizawl on 17 April. He published his appeal to open mission field in Lushai Hills in June and July 1891 issue of Y Goleuad. Welsh General Assembly at Machynlleth in June 1892 decided to adopt Lushai Hills as an extension of the Khasi Hills mission field. By then Williams had died of typhoid on 21 April 1892 at Mawphlang, some 25 km from Shillong city.

The arrival of Gospel in Mizoram, "Missionary Day", is observed by the Government of Mizoram as public holiday on 11 January to commemorate the arrival of F.W. Savidge and James Herbert Lorrain in 1894. However, the date of his arrival, 15 March, was adopted as "Missionary Day" by Mizoram Presbyterian Church in its 89th General Assembly in 2012.

== Biography ==
- Synod Executive Committee (2013). Rev. William Williams (Mizorama Chanchin |ha thlentu hmasa ber). Mizoram Presbyterian Kohhran, Mizoram Presbyterian Church Synod, pages 17
- Banrilang Ryngnga (1994). The Life and Works of Revd. William Williams. Synod Publication Board, Shillong, pages 86
