= Mawphlang =

- village
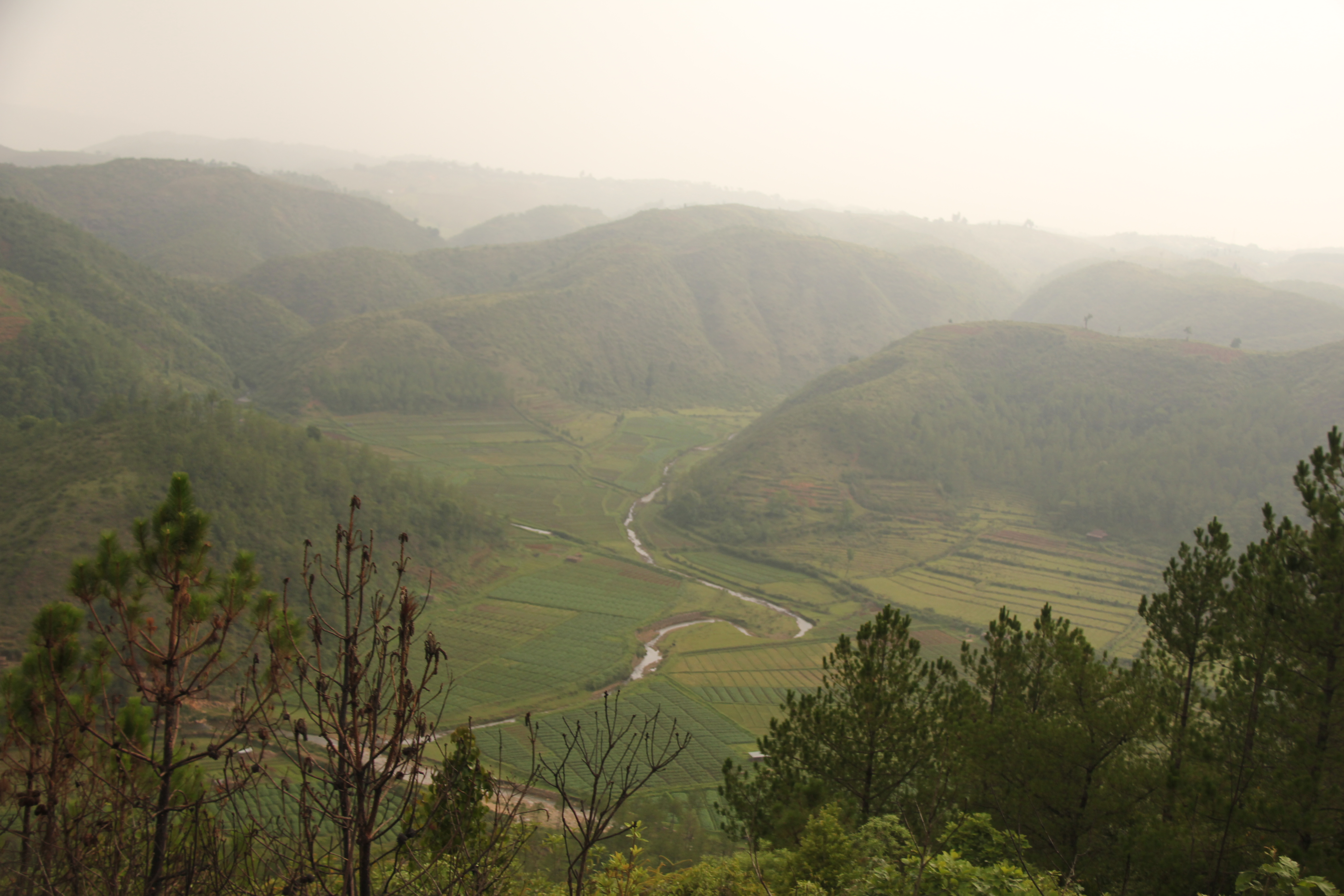
- Mawphlang valley and village

- Location in Meghalaya, India Mawphlang (India)
- Coordinates: 25°28′N 91°46′E
- Country: India
- State: Meghalaya
- District: East Khasi Hills

Languages
  - Official: English
- Time zone: UTC+5:30 (IST)
- Vehicle registration: ML
- Nearest city: Mawphlang
- Climate: Cwb

Mawphlang is a village in the East Khasi Hills district of Meghalaya state in north-eastern India, 25 kilometers from Shillong. The word maw means "stone", maw phlang means "grassy stone," and is one of many settlements in the Khasi hills named after monoliths. Mawphlang is the site of one of the Khasi Hills sacred groves. Khasi heritage village - located in the Mawphlang district - is considered to be the hub of Khasi culture. As per digital media NewsGram, the village project is in shambles. The heritage project was started with much fanfare, but has suffered losses due to governmental apathy and charges of corruption.

Mawphlang was the centre of Presbyterian Church of Wales missionary and medical activity in the Khasi Hills during the 1890s. A dispensary and then clinic were established in 1878 by Dr Griffith Griffiths of Brynmawr, Aberdaron who died at Mawphlang, 22 April 1892. After Griffiths came William Williams (missionary) who also died at Mawphlang.
