= Lal Sawi =

Anti-chieftain rebellion (c.1880)

Lal sawi
Date	c. 1888
Location	Eastern Lushai Hills
Result	Sailo Victory

Belligerents
Anti-Sailo rebels	Mizo chiefs

Commanders and leaders
Mizo people	Lianphunga; Lalhluma

Units involved
Mizo militia	Lalhluma

Lal sawi (transl. Punishing of the chief) was an unsuccessful insurrection by the Mizo people against their chiefs in precolonial Mizoram. The uprising began in the eastern Lushai Hils and spread throughout the rest of Mizoram towards the other Sailo chiefs before being put down by Lianphunga and Lalhluma.

== Background ==
Sangkima argues that the nature of chieftainship became too oppressive to the subjects of the chiefs, which encouraged the uprising. The measure of wealth in traditional Mizo society centred around the ownership of cattle such as sial and precious heirlooms such as brass gongs, beads and silver. However, such property would often find its way to the chief as it was seized out of greed. The taxes were also not collected for the chief but for all the officials in the village such as upas (transl. council of elders) and the priests which became heavy and burdensome to the subjects. The privilege of the upas encouraged them to request due and favours from subjects irrespect of the chief's authority and thus they too became targets of the people's contempt for chieftainship. Inability to pay the rice paddy tax or meat tax would lead to severe punishments such as expulsion or execution. This was soon changed with the adoption of currency where chiefs also chose to fine their subjects ₹40 for failure to pay customary tax.

Another issue of chieftainship was the policy of ram. The chief held the authority to dispossess individuals who disobeyed them and were expelled from the village. No reason or justification was required to expel a subject and annex their property. Individuals also had the right to switch allegiances to chiefs but any dues owed by the chief were sometimes renegaded. Lastly the chief also practised favouritism and this led to economic inequality among families of the chiefdoms who were unable to influence decisions of the chief without significant wealth.

== Rebellion ==
The rebellion was planned by the villagers under Lalkhuma, who stayed overnight in the river, making a fish trap, and made a plan to subdue Lalkhuma. The uprising thus began in Eastern Mizoram under the chiefs within the family of Vuta. Lalkhuma was the first chief to be affected, and soon his brothers Lungliana and Lalvunga also experienced the unrest and overthrow. The movement gained momentum among the subjects and spread to the Haulong chiefs descended from Rolura in the south. Even influential Haulong chiefs such as Bengkhuaia were affected by the uprising. The western Sailo chiefs also began to experience unrest as well, such as the sons of Suakpuilala. The only villages to not participate in the dethroning of chiefs were the villages established under Lalsavunga and Vanhnuailiana. It is assumed that these settlements were not oppressed or lacked the strength to participate.

The rebellion was bloodless as lethal weapons were used such as dao and guns but only two shots were fired during the whole uprising. Villagers would meet before the uprising in their village and pledge unity for their cause of dethroning their oppressive chiefs. The villagers would gather around a water basin and hold a burning piece of firewood before submerging it into the water stating "Lal lama ka tan leh chuan he mei and hian ka this ang"(transl. "I will die like this fire if at all I support the chief again.") Rather than physically assaulting the chiefs, the villagers would force them to undertake pledges.

Some villages instead of deposing chiefs either made them swear an oath to improve the conditions for the people or elected/chose a new chief. The chief was given a piece of firewood with a burning end and made to dip it into the water basin and recite the oath: "Ka lalna hi he thingthu ang hian mit rawh se," (transl. Let my chieftainship be extinguished like this fire.) This was implemented for the upas of the chief as well.

== Decline ==
With the successful uprisings many villages became chief less. Sangkima argues that two factors led to the failure of the uprising in the chief less period. The first factor was that the pledge of unity between the people began to fade or break after the goal of removing the chief had been succeeded. Several tribes and clans in a settlement would conflict over who should become chief with the consideration of legitimacy and fairness. Hence some villages restored their rightful chiefs due to this dilemma.

In Lungliana's village of Hmawngkawn, a Paihte girl was mistreated by other tribes and this conflict escalated among the people eventually leading to the Paite tribesmen supporting the restoration of the deposed chief against their former allies. Chief Lungliana was thus reinstated and cooperated with other chiefs to contact the Western Chief Lianphunga. Chief Vanphunga arrived in Lianphunga's village Lungtian and offered him to confiscate whatever he wanted from his former subjects to restore order. Lianphunga accompanied Lalhluma with a party of men and arrived at Hmawngkawn where a bamboo barricade had been set up to prevent their entry. Armed with guns, the two chiefs were threatened to not enter or they would be killed. Lalhluma declared "Kaimah Lalhluma, Lallula tupa, sarthi rual ka ni leo" (transl. "I, Lalhluma, grandson of Lallula will not die of unnatural death, shoot me.") Two shots were fired that missed Lalhluma. The gunner, Luahmanga jumped out of the crowd and declared that he had accepted his chief and relit his fire once more. The rest of the armed villagers surrendered as a result. The news of the pacification of Hmawngkawn led to the deposed chiefs to return to their chiefdoms to rule once more. The chiefs began to punish the leaders of the rebellion but this was unable to be fully complete as the British soon led the Chin-Lushai Expedition to annex the Mizo people.

== Sources ==
- Lalthangliana, B. (2006). Culture and Folklore of Mizoram. Aizawl: Publications Division Ministry of Information and Broadcasting. ISBN 978-81-230-2658-9.
- Sangkima (2004). Essays on the History of the Mizos. Guwahati: Spectrum Publications. ISBN 81-87502-77-0.
