= Frederick William Savidge =

The Reverend Frederick William Savidge
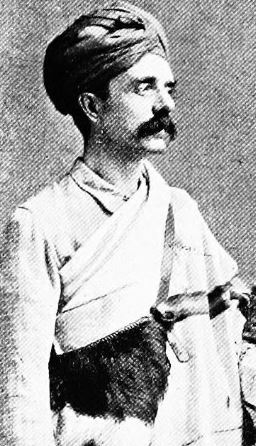
- F.W Savidge in Lushai attire
- Born: 1862; Stretham, Cambridgeshire, England
- Died: 28 September 1935 (aged 73); London
- Other name: Sap Upa (to Mizo people)
- Education: B.A., Ph.D.
- Occupation: Christian missionary
- Known for: Origin of Christianity, literature, and education in Mizoram

Frederick William Savidge (1862 – 1935) was a pioneer English Christian missionary in northeast India. He and James Herbert Lorrain brought Protestantism to Mizoram, and some parts of Assam and Arunachal Pradesh. Together they were entirely responsible for the creation of written language in Mizo, beginning of literacy, origin of formal education and establishment of churches in Mizoram. They devised the original Mizo alphabets based on Roman script, prepared the first book and dictionary in Mizo, started the first school among the Mizos. Mizoram has become the most Christian populated state in India. As a professional educator Savidge was single-handedly responsible for introducing quality education in Mizoram (now 100%, the highest in literacy rate in India). He is deservedly known as the Father of Mizo Education.

== Early life ==
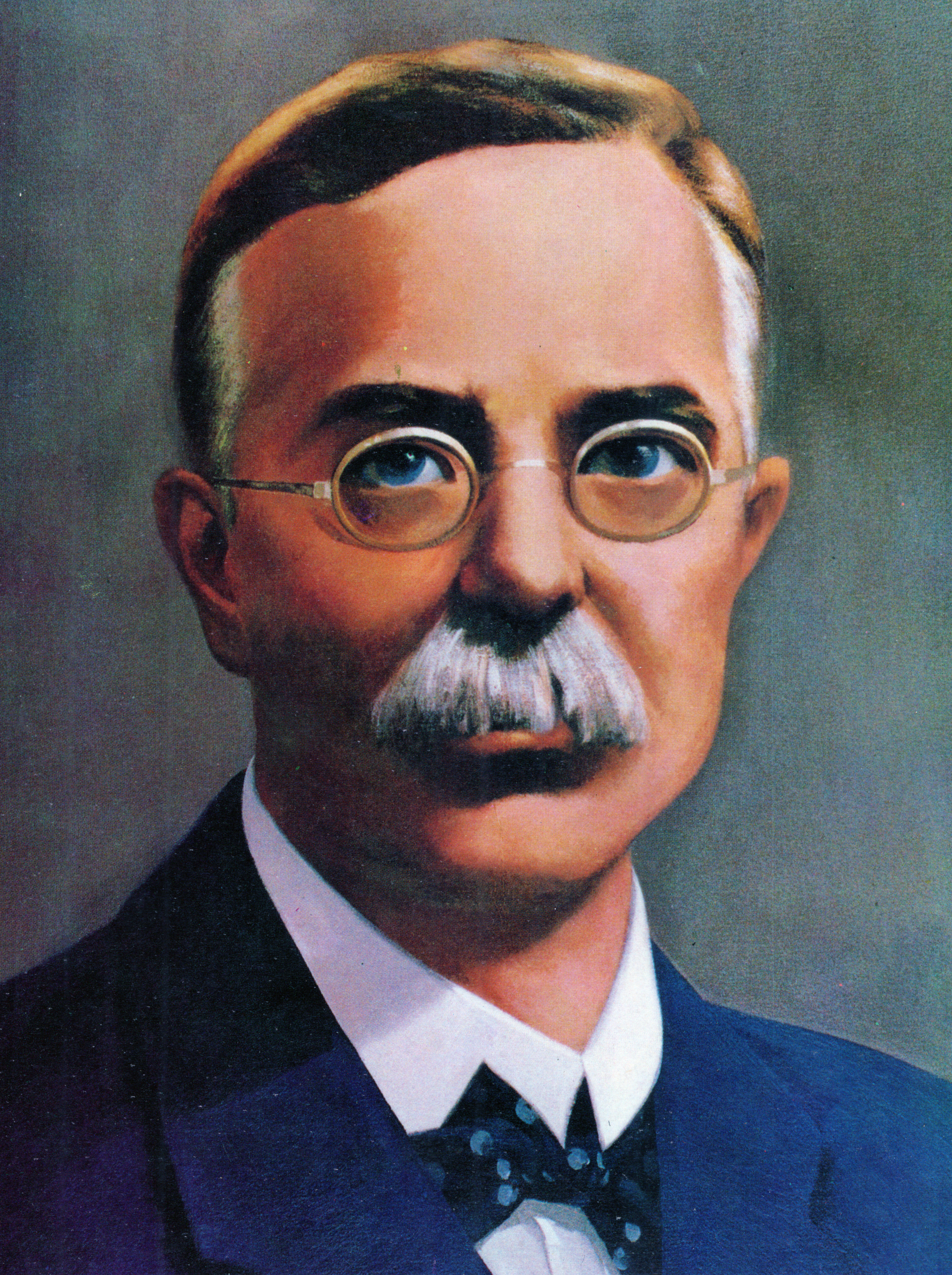
Portrait of Rev. F. W. Savidge

Frederick William Savidge was born in 1862 in Stretham, a small village in Cambridgeshire. His family belonged to Baptist Church. He had BA and PhD degrees. He worked as schoolmaster in London, where he met his future missionary partner J. H. Lorrain. The two became friends through their congregation at the Highgate Road Baptist Church in London. In 1891 he accepted the missionary post offered by the Arthington Aborigines Mission to work in India. He quit his teaching job and left England in October 1891. He sailed for India and arrived in Calcutta in November. He attended an evangelical campaign at Brahmanbaria (now in Bangladesh) organised by the New Zealand Baptists where he met Lorrain. Lorrain was already in India since 1 January 1890.

== Mission in India ==
=== Arthington Mission ===
Savidge and Lorrain were to start camping and work in Tripura according to the plan of Arthington Aborigines Mission. From Brahmanbaria they headed east into Tripura, where their visit was bluntly objected by the ruler, Maharaja. Dejected they travelled northward into Chittagong. Here they stayed for sometime awaiting permission to enter Lushai Hills (now Mizoram). Since Lushai Hills was still under tribal chieftainships with constant warfare, their application was deferred and allowed to stay at Kasalong village, the nearest possible location. The area suffered a heavy shortage of food supply, and infectious diseases were rampant. They stayed for a few months under constant hunger. To defend themselves from any tribal intrusion the Rangamati Commissioner provided them with a rifle. Unfortunately neither of them had any experience in shooting, and failed to hit jungle fowls flogging around their hut. Then they suffered from severe dysentery. The medical doctor advised them to move to Darjeeling where a colder climate would revive them. After they recovered the doctor suggested they return to England for fear of their health. They were more determined than ever and soon sought passage to Mizoram. They stayed at Silchar for one whole year in 1893. Fortunately they could encounter some Mizo visitors from time to time, so that they could start learning their language. Finally a permit was issued and they immediately set off on Tlawng River in a canoe on Boxing Day of 1893. They arrived in Aizawl on 11 January 1894. The day is now observed as public holiday as "Missionary Day" in the state. They made camp at Thingpui Huan Tlang, MacDonald Hill, Zarkawt. They were the first foreigners the Mizo had ever seen having not authority on anything, so that they soon earned the nickname Sap Vakvai ("Vagabond Sahibs"). They immediately worked on creating Mizo alphabets based on Roman script. After only two and half months, Savidge started the first school on 1 April 1894. Their first and only pupils were Suaka and Thangphunga. The first book in Mizo Mizo Zir Tir Bu (A Lushai Primer) was released on 22 October 1895. They translated and published the Gospels of Luke and John, and Acts of the Apostles. They also prepared A Grammar and Dictionary of the Lushai language (Dulien Dialect) which they published in 1898, and became the foundation of Mizo language.

=== Mission to Arunachalis ===
The Arthington Mission mandated that the missionaries should move to new fields, and handed over its field to Welsh Presbyterian Mission in 1897. The Welsh Mission objected to the continued service of Savidge and Lorrain because of their Baptist persuasion. They left Aizawl for England on 31 December 1897. After taking up a brief course of medicine, they ventured back to India in the name of Assam Frontier Pioneer Mission, an independent mission. They first worked at Sadya in Assam (now Arunachal Pradesh) among the Abor and Miri tribes. They prepared Gospels in their language, and compiled the Abor-Miri Dictionary.

=== Baptist mission to southern Mizoram ===
Since the Welsh Mission managed only the northern part of Mizoram, the Baptist Missionary Society of London adopted the new field. The experienced Baptist workers Savidge and Lorrain were the immediate choice. They accepted the appointment and arrived in Lunglei on 13 March 1903 and settled at Serkawn. This marked the establishment of Baptist Church in Mizoram. For effective administration Savidge took up education and social works, while Lorrain pursued pastoral and translation works. They both got married during this period. The Savidges were fully devoted to school management, theology classes, medical centre and social services. Their educational works were a tremendous success that by 1921 there were already fifteen schools with 421 students in the region. The medical services were strengthened as a small dispensary in 1919 with the help new missionaries. The dispensary ultimately developed into the present day Christian Hospital Serkawn. The present Baptist Higher Secondary School, Serkawn, was established as an extension of Savidge's school. Evangelism in Mizoram was recorded as the most successful development in any BMS field in the 20th century. Between 1919 and 1924, the total Baptist community increased from 3,670 to 8,770, and church membership from 1,017 to 3,198.

== Honorific names ==
Savidge and Lorrain were given an honorific title Zosap (meaning "Mizo Sahib" or "respected master". Note that "sahib" was adopted from a Hindi title meaning "master") because of their services to Mizos. When David Evan Jones from the Welsh Mission arrived in 1897 to take over the mission, Mizo called the young Welshman "Zosapthara" (meaning "the new/fresh Mizo Sahib"), Jones automatically became "Zosaphluia" ("the older Mizo Sahib"), and Savidge became "Sap Upa" (simply "old Sahib") as he was the oldest. Lorrain, on the other hand, due to his different complexion became "Pu Buanga" ("Mr Brown"). They were known only by their new names among the Mizos.

== Later years ==
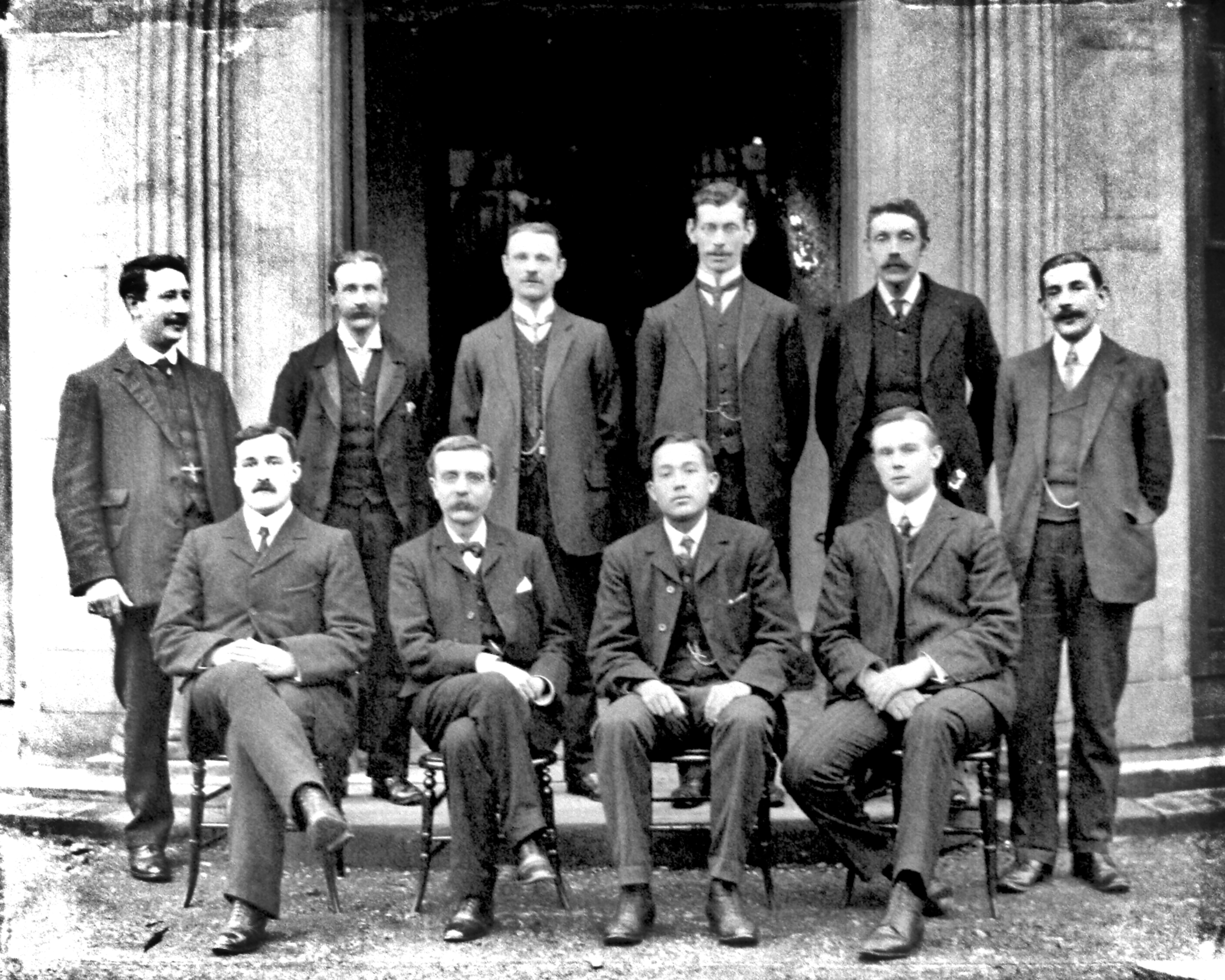
F. W. Savidge (Second left Sitting) and his adopted Mizo son C. S. Murray (Second Right sitting) in United Kingdom

Savidge became poorer in health and retired in 1925. He left Mizoram on 13 April 1925 for England. He brought home a soil from Serkawn to be buried with him. He lived in London, but his health was worsened by diabetes mellitus. After long suffering he died on 28 September 1935.
