= Serkawn =

Sêrkâwn
- village
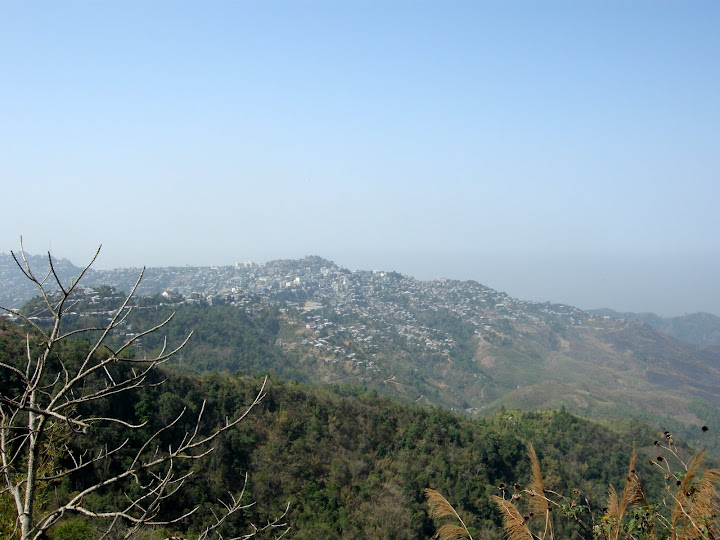
- Lunglei with part of Sêrkâwn

- Location within Mizoram Location within India
- Coordinates: 22°54′28″N 92°45′36″E
- Country: India
- State: Mizoram
- District: Lunglei
- Named for: Lemons in the area
- Elevation: 722 m (2,369 ft)

Languages
  - Official: Mizo
- Time zone: UTC+5:30 (IST)
- Postal code: 796691
- Vehicle registration: MZ
- Website: mizoram.nic.in

Sêrkâwn is a village within Lunglei Administrative Block, Mizoram, India. It is continuous with Lunglei within 1 km area. It is 107 km from the state capital Aizawl. The place chosen by British missionaries, it is the home of Christianity and formal education in southern Mizoram. The oldest schools and hospital in southern Mizoram were established there. It still is the centre of administration of Baptist Church of Mizoram.

The British used to call it (as a literal translation) "Lemonvale". The name is due to abundant lemon trees native to the place during the British occupation. It remained the principal centre of learning and music during the 20th century.

== History ==
There is no available record of habitation in Sêrkâwn before the advent of British missionaries. James Herbert Lorrain and Frederick William Savidge, sent by Baptist Missionary Society of London, arrived in Lunglei on 13 March 1903 and chose their settlement at Serkawn. They started organising school, theology classes and medical services. The medical services were strengthened as a small dispensary in 1919 with the help of new missionaries. The dispensary ultimately developed into the present day Christian Hospital Serkawn. The present Baptist Higher Secondary School was established as an extension of Savidge's school. By the 1930s there were some twenty isolated families in the village, and became a village of educated people. Between 1932 and 1946 the school authority held annual festivals, famously known as "Sêrkâwn Concert". Major activities included music concert and plays. This was the first ever entertainment festival of any kind in Mizoram.

== Geography and climate ==
Sêrkâwn is only a kilometre away from the centre of Lunglei town, the district capital of the region. It is a smooth running hillock with rich natural vegetation. It is naturally covered by plenty of grassland, fir and banyan trees. Climatic condition is very mild with an annual average temperature of ~20°C.

== Education and institutions ==
Established by British missionaries, Sêrkâwn has the best developed school in southern Mizoram. The first elementary school was started by F.W. Savidge, and was gradually expanded to different levels. There are Serkawn Primary School, Serkawn Middle English School, Serkawn Sikulpui, Baptist English School, and Baptist Higher Secondary School. In addition Serkawn Christian College is a major institute of nursing.

== Other landmarks ==
- Old Age Hall worth INR 1.15 million was constructed by Government of Mizoram in 2013 for public recreation. It consists of a recreational hall for senior citizens, health clinic and a nursery, along with a garage.
- Sports stadium is currently under construction. The foundation stone was laid down by Lal Thanhawla, Chief Minister of Mizoram, on 23 September 2013. The project worth INR 241,808,000 was sanctioned by the Government of India. It will have a standard-sized football ground, and public gallery with 1,000 seating capacity.
