= Robert Arthington =

British investor and philanthropist (1823–1900)

- Born: 20 May 1823; Leeds, England
- Died: 9 October 1900 (aged 77); Teignmouth, Devon
- Occupation: Investment
- Known for: Christian evangelism

Robert Arthington (20 May 1823 – 9 October 1900) was a British investor, philanthropist and premillennialist. He was the son of a wealthy brewery owner from whom he inherited his fortune. He was brought up in a prosperous Quaker family, but later moved to become a member of a Baptist Church. Although an excellent student at University of Cambridge, he left without a degree. He devoted his life and wealth to Christian evangelism, committing himself to a life of a tramp and recluse, minimising his entire expenditure on his own welfare. This was due to his strong premillennialist belief that when the Gospel of Jesus is spread to the entire world, then the Second Coming of Christ would happen. He was the benefactor to the success of Baptist Missionary Society and London Missionary Society, thereby becoming the principal factor in the spread of Protestantism, modernisation and formal education in the remotest parts of the world.

== Early life ==
Robert Arthington was born on 20 May 1823 in Hunslet Lane, Leeds. He was the only son among four children of Robert Arthington and Maria née Jowitt. His father was a successful brewery owner. Both his parents were committed members of the Society of Friends and were the leading figures in Leeds. He studied at the University of Cambridge with an excellent academic record. Following his mother and two of his sisters, he left the Society of Friends and joined the South Parade Baptist Church in 1848. Robert Sr. closed his business in 1846 to live a life of temperance, though he refused to sell it. Both the parents died in 1864 leaving an inheritance of £200,000 to Robert Jr.

== Investments and achievements ==
He invested his wealth, mostly in British and American railways, which catapulted him to greater wealth. He used his riches to the strengthening of missionary works. He contributed massively to Baptist Missionary Society (BMS) of London, and also to London Missionary Society (LMS). It was only because of his philanthropic deeds that many remote parts of the world received Christianity.

=== BMS Congo Mission ===
One of Arthington's achievements was his contribution of £1,000 to BMS to launch Congo Mission in 1877. A steamer Peace was purchased from Arthington's initial donation of £4,000 in 1880 and additional £1,000 in 1882. The project was to advance the mission at Congo River possibly up to LMS Tanganyika Mission, which was also funded by Arthington. In 1884 he gave another £2,000 to BMS for extension of the mission as far as Kisangani. In 1892 he added £10,000 to the fund so that the mission can reach Upper Nile region. It was further reported that Arthington was an anonymous donor of £5,000 to the Church Missionary Society to enhance mission expedition in Uganda.

=== Arthington Aborigines Mission ===
Arthington established his own Arthington Aborigines Mission in 1889 for evangelisation of tribal people in northeast India. Two British missionaries J. H. Lorrain and F. W. Savidge. They started teaching and preaching the Mizo tribes of Mizoram in 1894. They helped to create the written language of the natives, textbooks, dictionaries, and vernacular Bible (in parts). This was the origin of Christianity and formal education among the Mizos (Mizoram remains the most Christian state and second highest literacy rate in India). However, due to conflicting Arthington's impatience and their method of evangelism, they left the Arthington mission in 1898 to set up their own field in Arunachal Pradesh. Arthington then turned his attention to the Kond people of Orissa, which resulted in mass conversion. The same mission also sent William Pettigrew from Edinburgh to Manipur in 1894. However, the Raja of Manipur forbid him to preach among Meiteis in the Imphal. He worked with great success among the remote tribes such as Tangkhul Nagas and Kukis.

=== Hospitals ===
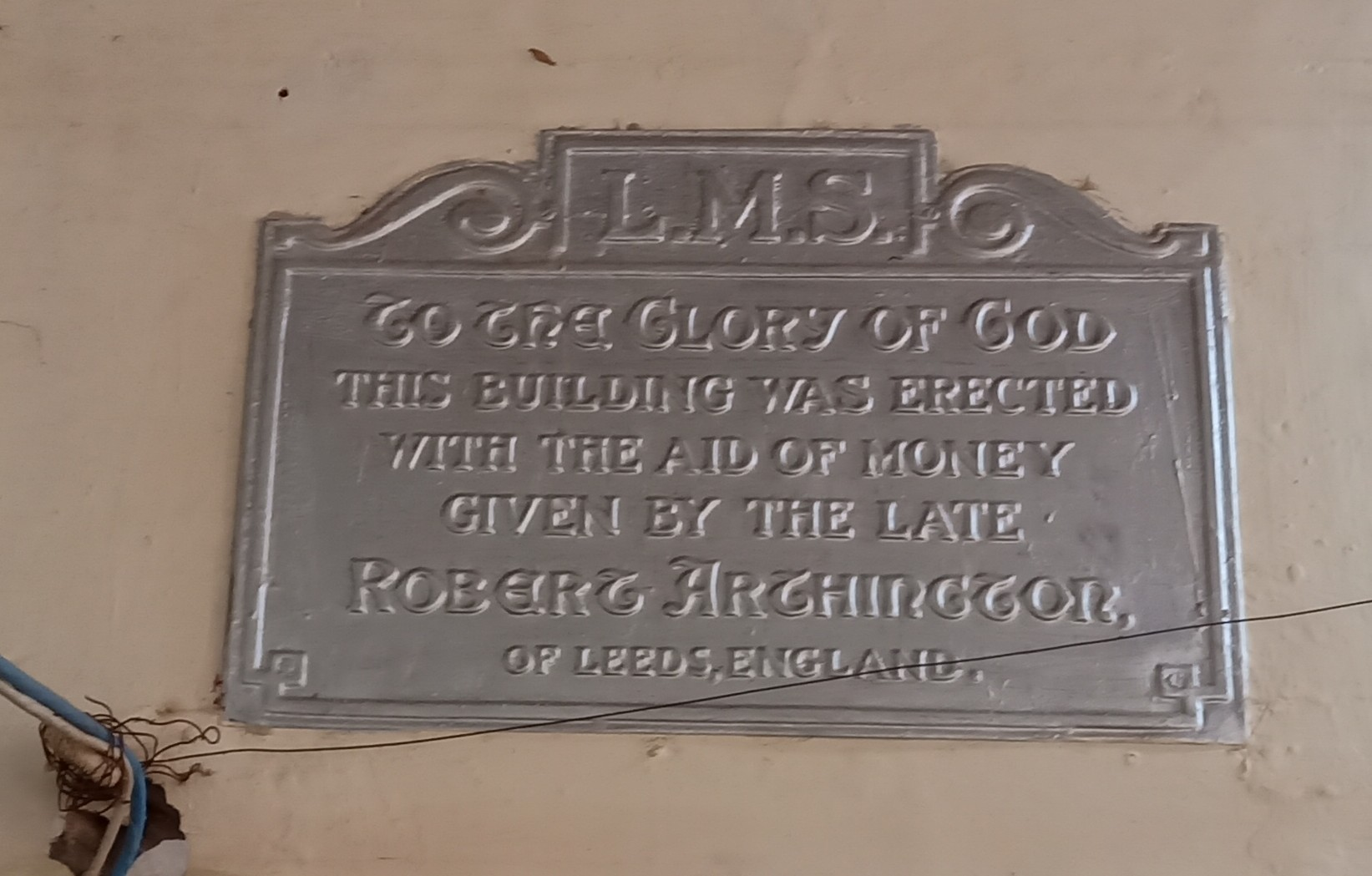
A memorial at a hospital in India

Arthington made a total donation of £20,000 to the Leeds Hospital for Women and Children during his lifetime. In recognition of his charity a new hospital at Cookridge was named Robert Arthington Hospital. He financed the hospital and was opened in May 1905. It was running until 2008.

== Personal life ==
Following his father's lifestyle, Arthington spent his life in strict moderation as a bachelor. He bought a plot of land in Headingley Lane from Misses Marshall 1868 and built a large stone house there. He moved from Hunslet to this house at 57 Headingley but occupying only a single room. He cooked his own meals, wore the same cloth for seventeen years and made friends with students who were in need. He slept on a chair, wrapping himself with his coat. He did not allow anyone access to his room, except special visitors. He would not even light the room for visitors, as he believed that "it was possible to speak as well in the dark as you could in the light". He limited his weekly expenditure to half crown. This self-imposed austerity and eccentricity earned him a nickname "Headingley Miser". By his restricted expenditure he could contribute large amounts of money to Christian missions for global evanglisation. He even willed his estate worth about five million dollars to the missions. His ideology was led by premillennialism that the spread of Christianity would hasten the Second Coming of Christ as foretold in the Gospel.

His temperance commitment was most likely influence by a letter from a missionary, which was found among his belongings after his death. The missionary wrote, "Were I in England again, I would gladly live in one room, make the floor my bed, a box my chair, another my table, rather than the heathen should perish for the lack of knowledge of Jesus Christ." Arthington lived more or less like this.

== Death and legacy ==
Robert Arthington died on 9 October 1900. In his deathbed, he requested to have read to him the Sermon on the Mount and Psalm 72. After the reading, he said, "Yes, it is all there – all!" The inscription on his tombstone at Teignmouth, Devon, bears:

ROBERT ARTHINGTON
Born at Leeds 20th May 1825
Died at Teignmouth 9 October 1900
His life and wealth was devoted to the spread of the Gospel among the Heathen

Arthington had prepared his last will and testament on 9 June 1900. He bequeathed a major portion of his estate to Christian missions, and only one-tenth of it to his first cousins, or if they were deceased, to their children. His will was poorly drafted, therefore, took the High Court of Chancery to approve it after five years, in 1905. Further, because of outstanding claims from the family, the actual distribution of the property took another five years. By then the monetary value had risen to £1,273,894. Twenty-one first cousins received £111,000 to be equally divided. Nine-tenth of the money was then shared by BMS (fifth portion) and LMS (fourth portion), with the amounts of £466,926 and £373,541 respectively. The will specified that preference should be given to the Gospel of Luke, Gospel of John, and Acts of the Apostles to be available in vernacular languages. The bequest was to be used within twenty-five years. Alfred Henry Baynes, the General Secretary of BMS, became the trustee until his death in 1914. He fervently pursued evangelisaion of Africa as was the over-riding zeal of Arthington. The LMS on the other hand extended their mission to China and India, in addition to Africa.

In the 1860's Arthington financed the establishment of a settlement in Liberia, along the Saint Paul River, northeast of the capital city of Monrovia. His contribution of 1000 pounds sterling to the American Colonization Society supported the migration of emancipated Americans from North Carolina, South Carolina, and Georgia to establish the settlement, named Arthington, Liberia, after him.
