= Dâra =

Mizo interpreter

Pu Dara
- Lal Dara
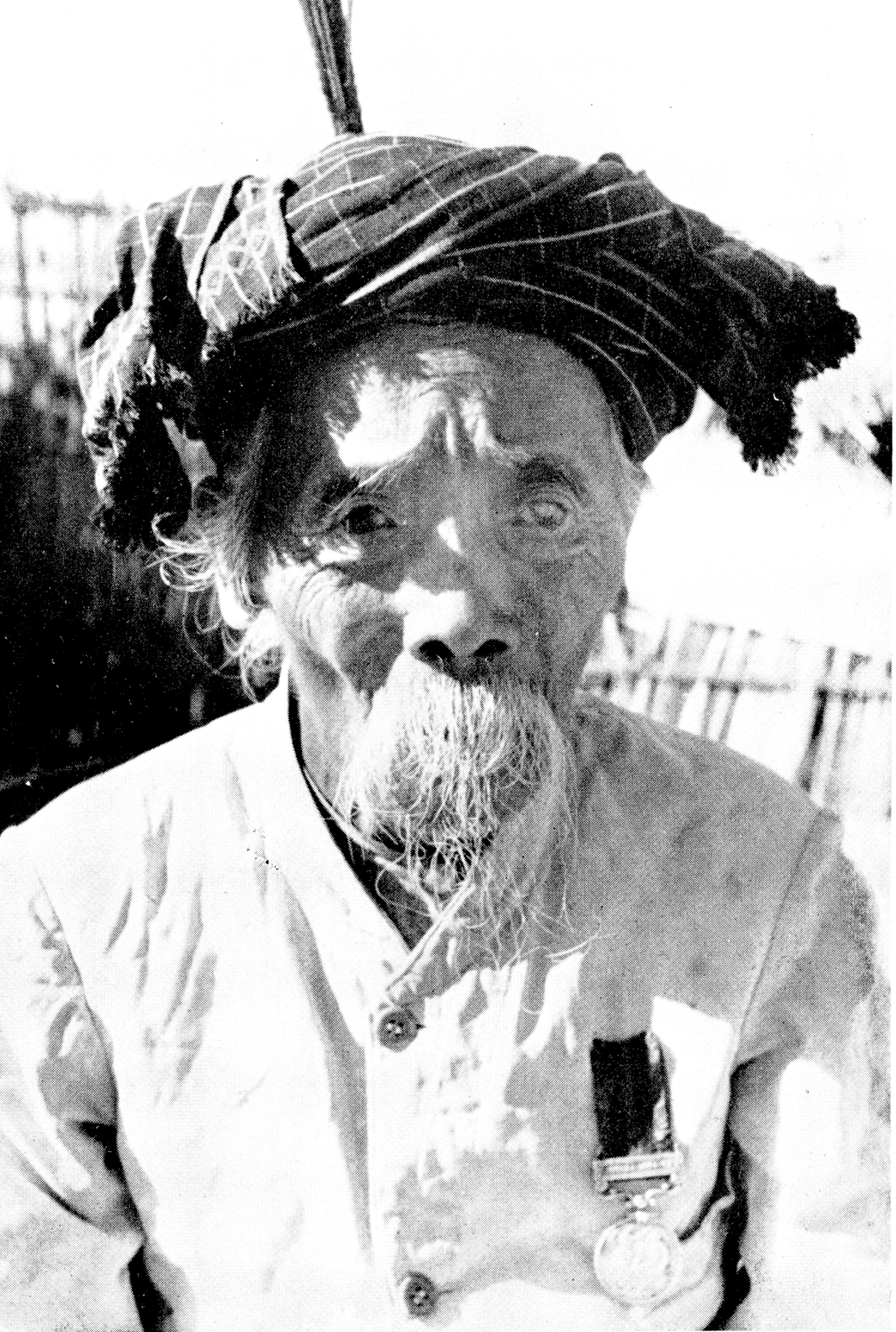
- Pu Dara c. 1940 photographed by Anthony Gilchrist McCall
- Born: Darmaka Ralte; 1843; Hmuizawl
- Died: 1943 (aged 99–100)
- Occupations: British interpreter Chief of Pukpui
- Known for: British ally in Lushai Rising
- Title: Chief of Pukpui; Pukpui Lal
- Term: c. 1901-1925
- Predecessor: Position Established
- Successor: Thanghuta
- Children: 5

Darmaka Ralte (1843-1943) also known as Dâra was a Mizo interpreter for John Shakespear during the early era of British rule in the Lushai Hills. He later became Chief of Pukpui.

== Life ==
Dâra was born Darmaka Ralte in 1843 in the village of Hmuizawl. At a young age, he travelled to the plains in Cachar and cohabited among the plainsmen and learnt Hindi. He would visit Sylhet and Cachar mostly for the selling of crude Indian rubber. His acquisition of Hindi provided him with opportunities in work, which led to his employment in the Burmese police guard under the British. Before that, he had heard at Silchar the government needed Lushai interpreters but was struggling to find any as most Mizos avoided going far to distant villages for interpreting. He stayed in Silchar for three years as an instructor of the Mizo language to the British frontier officers. However, as the British officers became fluent he became redundant. Dâra returned to making amber necklaces as a trade. Hearing the cheap price of supplies in Rangoon he went to British Burma with a letter of recommendation from Cachar officials. His amber beads trade wasn't as profitable as expected and he thus served in the Burmese police instead.

Following the annexation of the Lushai hills (modern day Mizoram in the Chin-Lushai Expedition, Dâra returned to work in the new administration being set up. He left the police force and carried a letter in English and Burmese from British officials. For a while, Dâra worked as a chaprassi at the house of Betal Ram. Soon at Fort Lungleh, he met Shakespear. Shakespear was an intelligence in the expeditionary force at the time, and they met in Hauruang. Upon their meeting and Dâra's request for employment, Shakespear took him in as a personal servant until a vacancy for an interpreter could be filled. Eventually, Dâra became an interpreter, and his proficiency in Hindi propelled him to head interpreter. He was labelled as a "most honest and loyal man" by the British officers.

Following the annexation, Dâra participated along the British during the Lushai Rising. While the British dealt with resistance, Dâra managed communication and capturing of chiefs. Shakespear noted that Dâra's balance of local Mizo customs and British government structure was an indispensable trait. This allowed Dâra to help the British capture the chiefs, Lalthuama, Vansanga, Zakapa and Zaduna. In reward for his services, Dâra was awarded the Lushai Expedition silver medal. He was rewarded with two sial that were confiscated from Zaduna as a token of thanks from the British government. In the Lushai Rising, when Shakespear and Dâra were besiged in Vansanga's villahge of Chipphir, they were invited by Vansanga's mother to establish terms. However, Dâra cautioned Shakespear about the deception of Mizo chiefs. The force was ambushed upon arriva,l but Shakespear led an assault on the village and captured it. Another incident during the Lushai rising concerned the village of Lungrung. Dâra advised shakespear that any attempt to attack would lead to their deaths. The villagers mocked the British force for attacking from a superior highland position that overlooked them. They asked for Shakespear to meet them alone to make peace terms. The British shot a few rounds but missed due to the difficult angle and positioning. The villagers threatened to take both Shakespear and Dâra's heads. However, while they were distracted, Shakespear's engineers reconnoitred a route and initiated a rear ambush, leading to the scattering and capture of the village. Dâra encouraged Shakespear to capture chiefs to curb the Lushai Rising. He concocted a plan to capture Chief Vansanga who was the most powerful in the south at the time. Using his communication and intelligence on Vansanga, Shakespear and Dâra approached the small village in the middle of the night where Plowden and Dâra captured Vansanga who was drunk asleep. Dara was also one of the two interpreters who testified against Charles Stewart Murray for his sexual misconduct that led to Zakapa's participation in the Lushai Rising, while British officers whitewashed it.

Across the British colonial era in Mizoram, several officers and administrators praised Dâra's services. As a final reward, he was offered either ₹200 or the chiefship of a village. While Dâra originally took the money his wife reprimanded him for not choosing chieftainship which grants several privileges for life. Dâra hurried back with the money and exchanged his reward for chieftainship. His petition was accepted and Dâra was proclaimed chief of Pukpui.

This earned him the title Lal Dâra (Chief Dâra). He is argued to be the first commoner appointed by the British as chief. His territory was defined as Pukpui and Kawmzawl and permitted to establish settlements anywhere within the boundary. During the Christianization era of Mizoram, the baptist missionaries began to grow in influence and their settlers began to farm on Dâra's land. A proclamation was made to protect his sovereignty and ban jhumming on his land from the church members. During this time in 1903, Dâra also expelled Christian converts from his villages, which led to the Christian village of Sethlun being established in 1903.

Dâra had three sons and two daughters. His son Thanghuta succeeded him in 1925 as Pukpui chief when Dâra became too old. Dara died at age of 100 in 1943.

== Sources ==
- Jackson, Kyle (2023). The Mizo Discovery of the British Raj. Vancouver: Cambridge University Press.
- McCall, Anthony Gilchrist (1949). Lushai Chrysalis. London: Luzac.
- Vanlallawma, C. (1994). Tun Kum Za Chunga: Mizo Hnam Puipate (in Mizo). Aizawl: M.C. Lalrinthanga.
- Zorema, J. (2007). Indirect Rule in Mizoram: 1890-1954. New Delhi: Mittal Publications. ISBN 978-81-8324-229-5. OCLC 271837683. OL 48056042M.
- Zorema, James (2021). The South Lushai Hills. Delhi: Mittal Publications.
- Zou, David Vumlallian (2018). "Vai phoba to Raj nostalgia: Sahibs, chiefs, and commoners in colonial Lushai Hills". In Dzüvichü, Lipokmar; Baruah, Manjeet (eds.). Modern Practices in Northeast India: History, Culture, Representation. New York: Routeledge. ISBN 978-1-351-27136-3.
