= H.W.G. Cole =

Indian Military officer and administrator (1866–1932)

Lieutenant Colonel Sir Henry Walter George Cole CVO OBE

Superintendent of the Lushai Hills
- In office 1899–1900
- Preceded by: John Shakespear
- Succeeded by: John Shakespear

Superintendent of the Lushai Hills
- In office 1905–1911
- Preceded by: Granville Henry Loch
- Succeeded by: W. Kennedy

Personal details
- Born: 8 March 1866 Roorkee, Uttar Pradesh
- Died: 30 September 1932 (aged 66) Madrid, Spanish Republic
- Parent: Henry H. Cole (father)
- Education: Wellington College, Berkshire

Military service
- Allegiance: United Kingdom
- Branch/service: Army
- Rank: Lieutenant-Colonel
- Unit: Royal Northumberland Fusiliers; 5th Gurkhas
- Battles/wars: Hazara Expedition of 1888; Chin-Lushai Expedition; Anglo-Manipur War

Lieutenant-Colonel Sir Henry Walter George Cole CVO OBE (8 March 1866 – 30 September 1932), was a British military officer and administrator. Cole worked as an administrator in Assam, Manipur, Lushai Hills and the Delhi durbar. He was later an organiser of British exhibitions.

== Early life ==
Henry Cole was born on 8 March 1866 to Lieutenant Colonel Henry H. Cole and Beatrice Catherine Trulock in Roorkee, India. He was baptised on 3 April. Cole studied at Wellington College before joining the Royal Northumberland Fusiliers in 1885.

== Career ==
In 1887, Cole transferred to the 5th Gurkhas. He participated in the Hazara Expedition of 1888 and the Chin-Lushai Expedition from 188 to 1890. Cole was then assigned to fight in the Anglo-Manipur War in 1891.

After the Anglo-Manipur War, Cole joined the Assam Commission in 1891 as Assistant Commissioner. In March 1896, Cole worked as the political agent and superintendent of Manipur until April 1899. In 1901, he was assigned the role of Deputy Commissioner of Assam. Cole was further assigned to the Lushai Hills as Superintendent of the Lushai Hills on two terms in 1899-1901 and 1906–1911.

=== Superintendent of Lushai Hills ===
Cole became political officer of the Lushai Hill district in 1899. He was responsible for changing the title to Superintendent instead. Cole's superintendecy presided over the death of Queen Victoria. As a tribute, he erected tombstones of Queen Victoria in all the villages in the Lushai HIlls and held a torch ceremony for the coronation of Edward VII. HIs first term was short but oversaw the opening of the first school in the Lushai Hills in 1899.

Cole was reassigned as superintendent of the Lushai Hills in 1905. He established a bazaar in Aizawl in 1909. During this time, Cole entered into the Bawi system campaign led by Peter Fraser. Fraser with the support of D.E. Jones met with Cole on 25 January 1910 to raise the issue of the practice of customary slavery known as the Bawi system and petitioned to abolish the system among the chiefs. Cole assumed that the Frasers' attempts to abolish the Bawi system were simply another theological aspect of abolishing tribal culture and simply refused by stating that the opinion of other missionaries was to be considered first.

Cole at the time agreed with previous administrators like John Shakespear who argued that the Bawi system provided for poor, vulnerable and impoverished individuals to take shelter under their chiefs in exchange for life service. Cole argued that abolishing the Bawi system would further intensify the suffering of the most vulnerable individuals in Mizo society. Fraser, who was friends with Lloyd George, the Chancellor of Exchequer, wrote to Cole informing him of his intention to use the imperial government to intervene to abolish the system and compensate the chiefs. Cole replied to Fraser's letter reiterating the point that the poor and impoverish are 'free' in the sense that they have a very light bondage in exchange for being fed and sheltered. However, this only prompted Fraser to spearhead an anti-Bawi campaign in the Lushai Hills with the support of missionaries and influential individuals. To counter the campaign the administration published a public notice that the issue of slavery was not really 'bound slavery' in the Mizo magazine Mizo le Vai Chanchin Bu. Fraser continued to ransom the Bawis under the chiefs and freeing them. Nag argues that Cole's military background and objectives in pacifying the unstable northeast frontier made him uncooperative in reforms that would lead to disturbance in the tribal way of life.

Cole with the Commissioner of Assam, Arbuthnot, held a meeting with Fraser on the nature of James Herbert Lorrain's support of Fraser's campaign. Cole argued that Lorrain never explicitly supported complete abolition of the system while Fraser asserted he did. Lorrain in fact writer a letter to Fraser recommending seven policies to reduce the impact of the Bawi system without abolishing it. However, Fraser refused to compromise. Cole asserted that the abolishment of the Bawi system would only be done with instructions from the imperial government and that it was not in his matter or power to do so. He instead counteroffered to Fraser to figure out ways to alleviate the burdens of the system with regular meetings with the missionaries. Fraser managed to publicize the issue in Wales via postcards however finally decided to send Cole a petition. Cole wrote the missionaries to further counter Fraser's intensifying movement. Cole argued that Fraser who was a relatively new and modern missionary was raising issues against the more established and older generations of missionaries who never noticed the issue of the Bawi system. Cole went as far to accuse Fraser of overriding the missionaries and exceeding his own authority as superintendent.

Chief Khawvelthanga who converted to Christianity met with Cole with the intention of freeing his slaves in the name of the Lord and in the name of King Edward. Cole interpreted this as a scheme by Fraser which would lead to more and more Christian chiefs to flood free Bawis and destabilize the frontier by deserting the labour needs in agriculture. Khawvelthanga was left disappointed that Cole did not approve of him freeing his slaves which angered Fraser. However Cole argued that, there was no reason for him to consider any matter that was not of a civil or criminal complaint and hence did not adhere to it.

Khawvelthanga freed his bawis and Fraser recompensed him a sum of ₹200 as a customary bawiman. Cole began to see the issue as an act to undermine his authority. Upon investigating the freeing of the Bawis, Cole figured that the Bawis originally belonged to Chief Suakhnuna, who migrated and the five bawis joined Khawvelthanga instead. Hence Khawvelthanga had released bawis that did not belong under him according to customary Lushai law. Cole continued to cite the authority of John Shakespear who was an expert in Lushai customs and culture in stating that slavery in the Bawi system was different compared to slavery in the west or among the Thahdo clans. Cole argued that Bawi or boi was mistranslated by Lorrain and Savidge as slave when it was more comparable to a servant.

Fraser was exiled from the Lushai Hills for his campaign. After meeting with Khasi missionaries, Fraser and the missionaries thus held a meeting in Mawphlang and signed an agreement to be shown to Cole. At the conference Cole asked whether Fraser could accept any form of the system continuing which Fraser did not support, as a result Cole barred Fraser from entering the Lushai Hills. A precondition was drafted by Cole to allow reentry on certain conditions. Fraser was not allowed to participate in matters of secular affairs or outside of medical missionary affairs. Fraser refused to sign it. Cole's deportation order of Fraser was reviewed by the British administration after Fraser appealed. After the Bengal partition was annulled in 1911, the Lushai Hills reverted to a district with Assam becoming a chief commissionerate. As a result, Cole was succeeded by Kennedy.

=== Later career ===
Cole was on special duty for the Delhi Durbar after his term in the Lushai Hills and took on the role of director of temporary works from January 1912 to April 1913. Cole was reassigned political agent of Manipur in 1914 before being placed on active service for World War One in France. As a result of his service he was made OBE in 1919 and retired from the Indian army in 1921.

=== Exhibition organiser ===
Cole was appointed Director of the Exhibitions Division of the Department of Overseas Trade and held the position till 1930. Cole organized several British government exhibits at prominent exhibitions such as in Rio de Janeiro Exhibition, Wembley Exhibition, Paris Exhibition, Antwerp Exhibition and Toronto Exhibition. Other domestic exhibitions included the British Industries Fairs at Birmingham and London. Henry Cole was made CVO in 1927 and was knighted in 1930.

== Death ==
Cole resided in Madrid when he was afflicted by influenza. After battling influenza for three days, Cole died on 30 September 1932. His wife Mai cremated Cole in Madrid. He was married twice with no children.

== Sources ==
- The Times (1 October 1932). "Sir Henry Cole". The Times. No. 46253. Times Newspapers Limited. Gale Primary Sources.
- The Sunday Times (2 October 1932). "Sir Henry COle". The Sunday Times. No. 5712. Times Newspapers Limited. Gale Primary Sources.
- Nag, Sajal (21 April 2016). The Uprising: Colonial State, Christian Missionaries, and Anti-Slavery Movement in North-East India (1908-1954). India: Oxford University press. ISBN 978-0-19-946089-2. LCCN 2015515443. OCLC 948338892. OL 28604513M.
- Samuelson, Ramchuani Sena (1985). Love Mizoram. Imphal: Goodwill Press.
