= Darbilhi =

Southern Mizo chieftainess (d.1901)

- Chieftainess of Muallianpui; Muallianpui Lalnu; Darzo lalnu
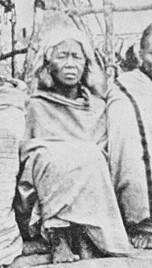
- Fânai chieftainess Darbilhi, depicted by John Shakespear.
- Predecessor: Nochhuma
- Successors: Lalsailova; Lalkhama
- Died: 1901
- Spouse: Nochhuma
- Issue: Lianbuka
- House: Fanai
- Father: Zahuata (Note: Za Huat or Yahwit) (Chief of Thlantlang)
- Religion: Sakhua

Darbilhi (d.1901; English: Darbili) was a Mizo chieftainess of the Southern Lushai Hills (now Mizoram). She acted as regent after her husband's death and commanded the influence of Fânai chiefs. She was the daughter of Zahuata of Thlantlang and was influential in diplomacy among the various tribes and conflicts. She was a British ally and cooperated with John Shakespear and gave up land for the construction of Fort Tregear.

== Early life ==
Darbilhi married Nochhuma of the Fânai clan who ruled over the villages of Muallianpui, Darzo, Lungpuitlang and Darzotlang. After Nochhuma founded the site of Muallianpui with 30 houses, the Sailo chief Thawnglian attacked and took Nochhuma and Darbilhi who was pregnant as captives. However, upon hearing Darbilhi was the daughter of Chief Zahuat, she and her husband were released after a fortnight out of fear of his power. Following this, Nochhuma's father, Khawtindala, aided Nochhuma with more households. Khawtindala escorted Nochuma's brother, Pahnuna, towards Muallianpui. He divided his assets between Nochuma and Pahnuna. Darbilhi settled at Darzo permanently with her husband in 1880. The name Darzo became a shortened form of Darbilhi Zo (transl. Darbilhi highlands) which was named by Nochhuma.

Following the mautam famine of 1881, many immigrants migrated to Darzo which had a good harvest and stock of food reserves. Due to the pressures of immigrants and refugees, Darbilhi requested her father's intervention to intervene and intercept the immigrants. During this time, she lost her firstborn son, Hrangkulha, and out of grief, invited the famous poet Saikuti for a month at Muallianpui. Zahuat sent Darbilhi's brother, Vanghin to console and guide her grief during the time of loss. During this time, the Serkawr chief, in fear of Zahuat's retaliation, sent a peace envoy known as Taiing. Taiing during the raid of Muallianpui had tried to kill Nochhuma. Nochhuma killed Taiing upon arrival and ratified the peace deal this way. However, the Sangau chief instead rallied the Lungtian chief to wage war against the Fânai. The battle of Vanlaiphai saw one death each from Muallianpui and Lungtian and two deaths from Sangau. The Sangau chief thus sent the peace offering to Zahuat, Darbilhi's father, instead.

== Chieftainship ==
Darbilhi's chieftainship began in 1882 with the death of her husband and her son Lianbuka being mentally unfit to rule. She was assisted by her former husband's upas to advise her on governance. During her rule she made several raids on the Zahau and Lusei tribes. She even raided into the Chittagong Hill Tracts which was British territory and sometimes did so with assistance from the Lai tribes.

Being the daughter of Zahuat, a powerful Chin chief, she made peace and increased her influence over the historical enemies of the Fânai, such as the Zahau and Sailos. Darbilhi managed multiple villages as satellites with hamlets to claim empty land and delegated roles to capable administrators. She negotiated peace with Thangduta of Thlangtlang with a sa-ui tan. Darbilhi held talks with the Zahau chief Thlacheuva. The Zahau attempted to hold the Fânai chief Zaduna hostage for leverage. However, the Khuangli tribe, who were historically allied to the Fânai as their ancestral chief, was saved by Fânai during the Thlawnrawn Rawt under Lallula, intervened. The Khuangli warned the Zahau and negotiated Zaduna's release, which was successful unconditionally. She sent her emissaries, Ralduha and Hleichhama, with Khawtindala's son, Patlaia, to Zathlir. After many rounds of talks, there was a hard-fought agreement not to raid each other. This decision was unpopular among the Fânai subjects of Darbilhi. They composed a hla about it:

Mizo:
Do reng rawh zathang ral chu,
In Chelh loh leh Darkhawpui,
Khuafur hawktui angin kan lian leh dawn e.

English:
March on the waging head-hunting raids on Zahau,
Undaunted and undefeatable Darzo warriors,

Would surely scourge you like a torrential rain.

— Darbilhi

Since her son Lianbuka was mentally unfit, Darbilhi arranged for a suitbale heir to be born to him. She arranged a marriage to him with a girl from Thlantlang via a relative. However, Lianbuka only slept for one night and led to divorce. Darbilhi got Lianbuka remarried and bore a daughter with her however divorced her. Darbilhi finally arranged a marriage with a Fânai girl after requesting her hand from Sawilera of the Fânai Zarep clan. Darbilhi secured the chieftain lineage once her grandson Lalsailova was born.

As Chief Darbilhi cared for the captive women and bawis of the raids. She strictly protected the women until the relatives were able to ransom them. Darbilhi took on many women as bawi to safeguard them under her royal protection. She was known for also providing buckets of rice to starving and struggling subjects and thus was reputed for her benevolent rule.

=== Anglo-Lushai relations ===
The British applied the subclan term Muallianpui to all the Fânai villages. Darbilhi cooperated with the British. She supplied guides for the advance on Hausata's village who was being targeted for the raid on John Fraser Stewart's camp. After the capture of Lalthuama, Darbilhi escaped her village and avoided the British. The British, however, began communication via emissaries and met with Darbilhi to take an oath of friendship on 4 February 1889. Darbilhi also supplied herself as envoy to other chiefs such as Vantura and Dokulha who also tendered their submissions by informing her. After the Chin-Lushai Expedition, Darbilhi signed a treaty with the British represented by John Shakespear. She avoided fighting with the British by perceiving them to be more powerful and troublesome and thus agreed to negotiate her sovereignty. Under the British, Darbilhi was cooperative until in 1900 when she ordered the execution of individuals at Thingsai and Bualpui who were believed to practice witchcraft. The British investigated the matter seriously and imprisoned the lead perpetrator, Dokapa, for life imprisonment.

Under the British, she allocated land of Darzo to the British to build Fort Tregear. Vincent William Tregear was the commander of the Chittagong Column in the Chin-Lushai Expedition who subdued the Muallianpui Fânai tribe. Darbilhi further supported the British by making Shakespear her foster brother and influencing her vassal chiefs to help reinforce the British presence with rifles and coolies. Fort Tregear was used as an intelligence centre which linked to the columns of the Chin Hills in Burma. After Fort Tregear was built, Charles Stewart Murray led a force to Zakapa with coolies from Darzo supplied by Darbilhi. After Murray ordered Zakapa's women for sexual corvée, Zakapa refused and Murray threatened to take Zakapa's wife. The conflict escalated when Murray burned down Zakapa's granary, and the village turned on Murray and his party. Darbilhi's coolie, Kaphleia, shot a sepoy who was standing guard for Murray outside Zakapa's zawlbûk. Kaphleia was arrested and taken to Fort Tregear, where he was tortured. Darbilhi honoured Kaphleia and the other coolies and granted them a feast with zû. Due to Darbilhi's close ties with John Shakespear, he vouched for her until the case regarding Murray was settled.

== Later life ==
Darbilhi died in 1901. She was buried at Lungphun, Darzotlang. Before her death, she allotted her two grandsons, Lalsailova and Lalkhama the villages under her rule. Lalsailova received Lunglengtlang, Muallianpui and Lungpuitlang. Darzo and Vanlaiphai was granted to Lalkhama.

== Genealogy ==
Fanai Chiefs Family Tree

Thatinkhuala
Hniarthula	Hniarchenga	Khenzahnawka	Bawitlunga
Chenhranga	Zachhuma	Hlawndawhthanga
Tluangzachhawna	Fanaia
Hrangtintlinga	Pakhupa	Torela	Thaaia	Zarepa	Khintina	Chhuanchhira
Thathranga	Khawtinnawla	Ralzatlunga
Chhanruanga
Chhunhleia	Rorehlova
Aithanangvunga (Samtawia)	Kualsawia	Khawtindala	Zahuata (Note: Chin chief of Thlantlang)
Dokhama	Pahnuna	Nochhuma	Darbilhi
Zaduna	Lianchema	Zakapa	Pazika	Lianbuka
Lalsailova	Lalkhama

== Sources ==
- Lianchhinga, F. (2010). "Darbilhi: Chieftainess of Muallianpui(1841-1901)" (PDF). History Journal of Mizoram. X (1).
- Nag, Sajal; Lalsangpuii, R. (2024). "Reversing of Gender:Anti-colonial resistance by Women warriors in Northeast India". In Singh, Lata; Sinha, Shashank Shekhar (eds.). Gender in Modern India:History, Culture, Marginality. Oxford University Press.
- >Lalthlengliana, C. (2007). The Lushai Hills: Annexation, Resistance and Pacification. Akansha Publishing House.
- Sangkima (2004). Essays on the History of the Mizos. Guwahati: Spectrum Publications. ISBN 81-87502-77-0.
