= Hausata =

Southern Mizo chief (c.1849-c.1888)

- Chief of Lungtian; Lungtian Lal
- Predecessor: Taihmunga
- Successor: Dokulha
- Born: 1849; Khuanglum
- Died: 1888 (aged 38–39); Lungtian
- Burial: 1888; Lungtian
- Spouse: Ngundawngi
- House: Chinzah
- Father: Taihmunga
- Religion: Sakhua

Hausata (1849-1888; English: Howsatta) was a Mizo chief of the Lai clan. Hausata was the chief responsible for the killing of Lieutenant John Fraser Stewart and the beginning of the Chin-Lushai Expedition, which annexed the Mizo chiefs into the British Empire.

== Early life ==
Hausata was born in 1849 in Khuanglum to Taihmunga. Hausata was born in the Lai subclan of Chinzah. Taihmunga would die on the next village migration to Cherhlun and Hausata would inherit chieftainship. His early chieftainship oversaw advice and regency by his uncles Ngulhmunga and Taithaia. In 1868, Hausata and his followers left Cherhlun and migrated south towards Thlandungpui and permanently settled at Lungtian. Lungtian was established in the Blue mountain (Phawngpui in 1872. During this time, Hausata married Ngundawngi, the daughter of Thlantlang chief Zahuata. Zahuata was a powerful chief with 24 satellite villages.

== Chieftainship ==
Hausata settled in Lungtian and conducted a raid on Thangluah chief Lalchheuva's village Lungsen in January 1883. His father-in-law Zahuata aided him in the raid and this allowed him to take significant loot and 92 captives. Hausata had targeted Lalchheuva as he was on bad terms with Sailo chiefs and that raiding him would not incur revenge or penalties.

During chieftainship, Hausata succeeded in making his brother Dokulha chief of Fungkah and united with him and his brother Vantura for raids such as on Lalchheuva. Hausata's growing power and his guarantee of sovereignty with his powerful father-in-law allowed him to collect tributes and taxes from neighbouring chiefdoms such as the Reang, Mara and Pangs.

=== Chin-Lushai Expedition ===
Hausata, however, had a dispute with his wife, Ngundawngi, who returned to Zahuata. To amend the relationship, Zahauta demanded the head of a white man for her to return to him. To protect his sovereignty with Zahuata's powerful chieftainship, Hausata was obliged to his demands. Hausata attacked Lieutenant John Fraser Stewart, who was leading a survey party in the Saichal range. He was ambushed at Belaisury Tom, which was 18km away from Rangamati on 3 February 1888. The survey party was attacked, and Stewart was killed. Further reasons for the attack on the party detailed that British individuals had been encroaching upon the territories of the Chinzah chiefs. This attack incurred the response of the British who launched the Chin-Lushai Expedition.

General Tregear led the southern Lushai campaign against Hausata to bring to justice the killing of J.F. Stewart. A force of 1250 soldiers under Tregear moved towards Hausata's village of Lungtian. Captain John Shakespear worked in intelligence and cooperated with chieftainess Darbilhi. Darbilhi revealed that with the beginning of the expedition, Hausata had already died. General Tregear regardless began to march on 15 March 1888 and reached Lungtian 5 days later. Hausata's followers deserted the village but the force with Darbilhi's guides located Hausta's grave. They unearthed Hausata and found Stewart's gun and confirmed Hausata's death.

Hausata's health had suddenly declined with the beginning of the Chin-Lushai Expedition. His followers attributed this sickness to the bad omen of killing white men. Following his death, Hausata had no heirs and his chiefdom was inherited by his brother Dokulha.

== Sources ==
- Bawitlung, Vanlalringa (2011). "Hausata - Founder of Chinzah Chietainship in the Lai Autonomous District Council, Mizoram". Historical Journal of Mizoram. XII (1).
- Chatterjee, Suhas (1995). Mizo Chiefs and the Chiefdom. New Delhi: Mittal Publications. ISBN 81-85880-72-7.
- Zorema, J. (2007). Indirect Rule in Mizoram: 1890-1954. New Delhi: Mittal Publications. ISBN 978-81-8324-229-5. OCLC 271837683. OL 48056042M.
