= Granville Henry Loch =

British military officer and administrator (1859–1929)

Lieutenant Colonel Granville Henry Loch CIE

Superintendent of the Lushai Hills
- In office 1905–1906
- Preceded by: W.N. Kennedy
- Succeeded by: F.C. Henniker

Commandant of the Lushai Hills Military Police
- In office 1898–1914
- Preceded by: R.H. Sneyd Hutchinson, IP (South Lushai Hills); Capt. G.H. Loch (North Lushai Hills)
- Succeeded by: Capt. H.C. Nicolay 2nd Gurkha Rifles

Personal details
- Born: January 26, 1859 St George Hanover Square
- Died: December 30, 1929 (aged 70) London, England
- Relations: William Adam Loch (Father); Sophia Loch (b. Bates, Mother)
- Known for: Founder of Fort Aijal, (now Aizawl)
- Awards: Companion of the Order of the Indian Empire

Military service
- Allegiance: United Kingdom
- Branch/service: Indian Army
- Years of service: 1878-1914
- Rank: Lieutenant Colonel
- Unit: 3rd Gorkha Rifles; Lushai Hills Military Police
- Battles/wars: Second Anglo-Afghan War; Chin-Lushai Expedition; Lushai Rising

Lieutenant Colonel Granville Henry Loch, CIE (Lushai: Mandingputara, 26 January 1859 – 30 December 1929) also known as G.H. Loch, was an Indian Army officer and administrator. He served as the Commandant of the North Lushai Hills Military Police Battalion from 1891 to 1898 and the Lushai Hills Military Police Battalion from 1898 to 1914, while also holding additional charge as Political Officer of the North Lushai Hills in 1894 and the Superintendent of the Lushai Hills from 1905 to 1906. He is credited with the expansion and development of Fort Aijal, which would become the city of Aizawl.

== Early life ==
Loch was born on 26 January 1859 in St George Hanover Square. Among seven siblings, Loch was the second son of William Adam Loch and Sophia Brownrigg Loch. He had five sisters, namely Edith, Katherine, Sophy, Mary and Margaret, with two brothers, James and William.

== Career ==
Loch was commissioned in August 1878 and participated in the Second Anglo-Afghan War. He would continue on to serve in the Zhob Valley campaign of 1884. Later, Loch was assigned to the Shan States column and fought at Fort Stedman, receiving a medal with two clasps. Loch participated in the Chin-Lushai Expedition and pacified the Burmese frontier in 1895–1896. During the Chin-Lushai Expedition, Loch contributed and developed the city of Aizawl from the establishment of Fort Aijal.

Shortly the Battle of Ahmed Khel, Loch who was attached to the 3rd Gorkha Rifles and Ninth Gorkhas oversaw the construction of the Officer's Mess at Almora. The building was constructed by all ranks of the battalion under Loch's supervision.

=== Construction of Aizawl ===
When the British decided to settle on the abandoned site that would become Fort Aijal, Loch was assigned to blast away boulders on the river between Changsil and Sairang. This would make the boats passable and able to open communications and logistics. After the Western Lushai Rising under Khalkam was subdued by R.B. McCabe, Fort Aijal was expanded under the volition of the commandant of the Lushai Hills military police which was Captain Granville Henry Loch. Loch alongside Mr Davies worked together to develop Aizawl. Loch developed masonry barracks for the military police. Loch was described by John Shakespear as having the inclination of an engineer. After a storm which destroyed the temporary jungle thatched housings, Loch became determined to engineer long term stable development of Fort Aijal and its surrounding buildings. When Davies questioned the necessity of such quality of building materials, Loch replied that even after ten years of service in Kohima there weren't any stone houses there yet. Loch took on the costs himself personally to build his own houses. The public works department further commented on his built house as "good and fit for issue". Loch was requested an estimate of the budget required to upgrade the buildings in and around Fort Aijal in a strictly necessary manner which became approved. Loch employed women during construction and relied on a Khasi contractor, Sahon Roy, to achieve these goals.

By 1897, Loch had built the personal bungalow of the assistant commandant of the Lushai Hills military police. Furthermore, police barracks and a hospital were established. During that year, the construction of a quarter guard and office headquarters was also in progress to be completed in the same year with an armourer's workshop under delay. When Loch was granted the check for his construction the costs of building had exceeded the budget. This was attributed due to the lack of consideration for terrain development in the hilly locations that affected building costs. The matter was not noticed by the Public Works Department until the completion of the quarter guard exceeded the budget by twice the original amount. The chief engineer became enraged upon the revelation and an order was placed on Loch to discontinue any further building around Aijal. As a result, the armourer's workshop was finished early to an acceptable standard under the Executive Engineer. John Shakespear sent a report to the government on the Public Works Department's incompetence in finishing the armourer's workshop, which became contracted to Loch, who finished it in a few months.

Loch had also added a Queen Victoria memorial porch to the Quarter Guard. Loch privately financed a bust of Queen Victoria to accomplish the memorial. After moving the married quarters from the bachelor barracks, the emptied space contained a knoll of land which Loch began to pave. Loch cut away parts of the eastern roads and levelled the knoll into a parade ground. The labour for the parade ground was found by sepoys while Loch gave out contracts. The canteen fund provided the money for the whole operation, which was produced by the sums the workers paid to satisfy the labourers. As a result, the government were only made to pay ₹1,200 for the new parade ground. A range was also built by Sepoy Labour. The military police battalion, on Saturdays, was instructed to carry out eight-hour shifts in construction. Loch's battalion never had issues with the labour quotas for construction, as the excess manpower on Saturdays permitted little work per person. Regarding the Saturday shifts, Loch was recorded by Shakespear to jokingly state that he "was a good man". When Shakespear asked to elaborate, Loch explained that while the sepoys wished for rainy weather on Saturday, he prayed for dry weather and thus was favoured as a good man.

The construction of the Superintendent House was overseen by Shakespear's wife, who designed the building. Loch contributed to the construction by supplying his sepoys as labourers.

== Later life ==
Granville Henry Loch was appointed Companion of the Order of the Indian Empire in 1901. He retired in 1914 and moved back to London. However the outbreak of World War One saw him placed in special service under the war office in the censorship branch. He was discharged in 1919. He died on 30 December 1929 in a nursing home in London.

== Sources ==
=== BMD ===
- "Index entry". FreeBMD. ONS.

=== Books ===
- Reid, Robert (1942). The Lushai Hills: culled from History of the frontier areas bordering on Assam from 1883-1941. Calcutta: Firma KLM.
- Shakespear, John (13 July 1939). The Making of Aizawl. London: British Library.
- Chaltuahkhuma (1987). History of Mizoram. Aizawl: M.D.C and Sons.
- 39 Gorkha Training Centre (2003). Third and Ninth Gorkhas. New Delhi: Lancer Publishers & Distributers. ISBN 81-7062-290-5.

=== News ===
- The Irish Cathlolic Herald (11 January 1930). "In Memoriam". The Irish Catholic Herald. No. 1870.
- The Times (1 January 1930). "Obituary: Lieutenant.Colonel Loch". The Times. No. 45399.
