= Zakapa =

Mizo chieftain (1839–1914)

- Chief of Khawhri; Khawhri Lal
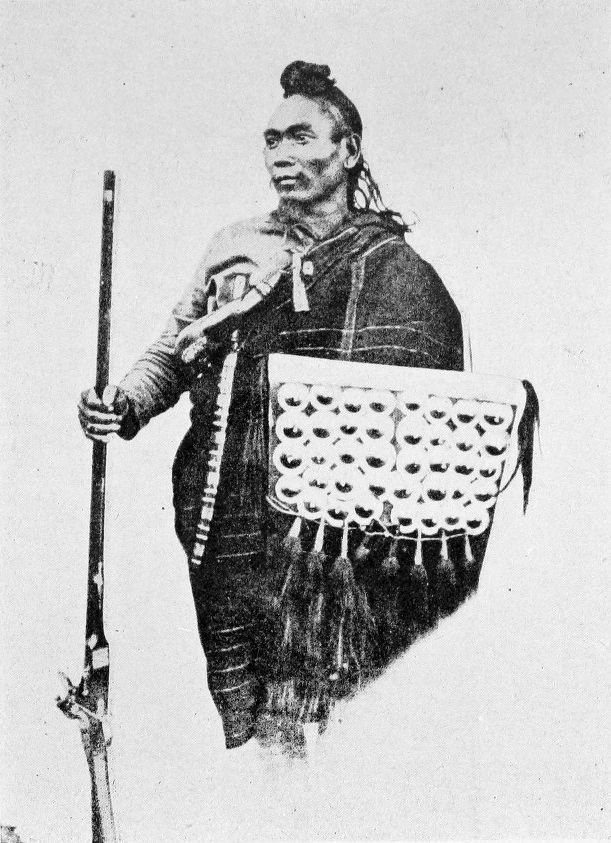
- A portrait of Zakapa
- Reign: 1864–8 August 1893
- Predecessor: Dokhama
- Born: 1839; Khawhri (present-day in Lunglei district, Mizoram)
- Died: 28 October 1914 (aged 74–75); Sailaluk
- Issue: Thanchhuma
- House: Fanai
- Father: Dokhama
- Religion: Sakhua

Zakapa, also known as Jacopa, was a Mizo chieftain of the Fanai clan and ruled the Vanlaiphai villages in present-day southern Mizoram, India. He is best known for his participation in the Lushai Rising.

== Early life ==
Zakapa was a descendant of Rorehlova, who established the Fanai chiefs and cooperated with Lallula. Rorehlova's eldest son Aithangvunga was Zakapa's grandfather. Aithangvunga's son Dokhama would move from Keltan to Khawhri. Zakapa would be born to Dokhama and become chief of Khawri in 1864. The villages of Cherhhlun, Lungkawih, Tuichang, Airthur and Tuipui would all become under his rule. He was born to three brothers, Zaduna, Lianchema and Pazika. He was the third son of Dokhama and brother to Zaduna, Lianchema and Pazika. Dokhama motivated Zakapa and Pazika to established Bawkte for a year or two until they lived in Thangmual for two years and became village chiefs themselves. At the age of 42, Zakapa intiaited chieftainship at Khawhri village and ruled through during the Chin-Lushai Expedition.

== Chieftainship ==
Zakapa was the superior chief of Vandula, an anti-British chief who cooperated closely with Vandula's wife Ropuiliani and son Lalthuama after his death. During the Chin-Lushai Expedition Zakapa readily surrendered and became friendly with the British. Zakapa's progression with British cooperation was left unfinished due to Seipuia, a rival chief being a longer-term ally to the British and opposing him.

=== Anglo-Lushai Relations ===
After the Chin-Lushai Expedition, the Lushai Hills became annexed by the British Raj. A North and South Lushai Hills were established. C.S Murray was assigned as the political officer of the South Lushai Hills and instructed to disarm all of the tribes with their weapons and quell any resistance. The Government of Bengal's initiative to build infrastructure introduced a coolie quota into the Lushai Hills, which was unpopular with the Lushai chiefs. Zakapa agreed to supply coolies to Murray along with his subordinate Dakopa, who supplied 59 men on 8 February 1891.

On 9 February, Zakapa and Lalthuama refused to meet Murray. Murray and Taylor entered into Zakapa's zawlbuk and ordered all other chiefs to leave. Zakapa did not act on Murray's trespass and obliged. A private conversation was had. Murray had stationed troops around Khawhri and warned Zakapa and Lalthuama of dangerous consequences. Murray subsequently burned the foodstock of Zakapa's settlement. In retaliation Zakapa attacked Murray's party and decapitated two sepoys before he managed to escape. The skirmish led to Murray's party killing 25 Lushai warriors. Murray's guards were killed due to being surrounded by Lushai musket men on all sides. His accomplice Taylor was severely wounded in his arm. Murray escaped the settlement and entered a hilly stream hence abandoning his men, money, ammunition and supplies.

As a result of the hostilities, Major Hutchinson captured Zakapa's subordinate chiefs and tortured the women of his settlement for his whereabouts. Zakapa was caught and arrested and deported from his village. Further British investigation showed that Murray's conduct had been dishonorable as a political officer. Murray and his subordinates had requested Zakapa for women for sex. Upon failure and refusal to provide the demands, Murray threatened to abduct Zakapa's wife. This was uncovered in court and Murray was demoted and transferred out of the Lushai Hills on the orders of the Government of Bengal.

== In hiding ==
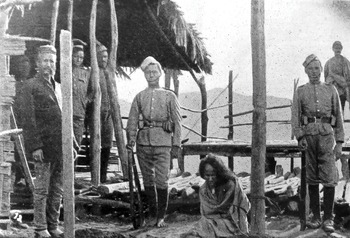
Zakapa on the day he was captured by John Shakespear.

Zakapa left Khawri and went to live with his brother Pazika. Zakapa left Khawri in 1892, soon after Murray and he had fought. Khawri remained without a chief for two years after his departure. The British government attempted to apprehend him and Captain Hutchinson along with Robert Blair McCabe were dispatched to Zakapa's village but he had already evaded capture. McCabe with 50 soldiers, Colonel Evan and Murray joined forces with Huthinzon on a second mission. However this meeting failed and they returned to their posts. Shakespear himself led 100 soldiers to Khawhri to investigate. When inquiring the whereabouts of Zakapa and Lalchhuma, Shakespear would beat the villagers with firewood if they claimed they did not know. Other villagers pointed in a vague direction to avoid punishment under Shakespear. Shakespear approached Thingsai village under Chief Patlaia offering any reward in return for Zakapa's whereabouts. Patlaia claimed Zakapa was at Khuangthing village. Shakespear ascended Uihili Tlang in the Lungkawlh village area to observe the village but returned to Darzo camp instead. The mountain peak Shapespear observed from is now known as Tarmita Khaw Thlir to signify Shakesspear's vantage mountain.

Zakapa's brother resided in Sailulak. Zakapa was caught by John Shakespeare. Shakespear had entered Sailulak searching for Zakapa. Shakespear offered a man in the village ₹300 to place his tin beside whoever Zakapa was disguised as. When Zakapa was found by Shakespear the village was surrounded by his troops. Zakapa was arrested and the truth of Murray's conduct was revealed. Shakespear offered to support Zakapa in court and help him. According to Shakespear's History of the Assam Rifles, the military police were deployed to the village. The sepoys entered the principal houses and emptied out all the inhabitants and placed them under the supervision of the guards. No one would identify who was Zakapa. However, after a while, a sepoy noticed a man with long hair in the crowd and pulled it back to identify Zakapa. Zakapa had been hidden by the villagers and disguised as a peasant and had been given the name Khuangthing Vaisawi. Regardless, Zakapa was sent to the Andaman and Nicobar Islands with the other chiefs while he awaited trial. The village was destroyed as a lesson to those who helped the outlawed chiefs.

== Later life ==
Shakespear took Zakapa to Calcutta in front of the viceroy where Charles Stewart Murray and he fought the case. Murray denied ever asking for women by Zakapa or making the threat. However, the court refused to believe Murray. The court convicted Murray, however to cover up the incident Zakapa was imprisoned in Calcutta Jail for a year. Zakapa was originally sentenced to five years but was released early and allowed to return to his home. However, as Khawri had been unoccupied, the villagers of Khawhri dispersed to Khuangthing and Thingsai and left it deserted. After prison, Zakapa returned and lived with his brother in Sailulak. Zakapa died on 28 December 1914 in Sailulak. He left behind three sons, Lalsuakpuii, Thanchhuma and Ngurchhingi who did not become very influential. Thanchhuma succeeded him.

== Legacy ==
The Department of Social Welfare and Tribal Affairs introduced the Zakapa award in 2023. The award recognises individuals, schools, churches and NGOs that have taken steps to improve the status of women or fight against violence towards women.

== Genealogy ==
Fanai Chiefs Family Tree

Thatinkhuala
Hniarthula | Hniarchenga | Khenzahnawka | Bawitlunga
Chenhranga | Zachhuma | Hlawndawhthanga
Tluangzachhawna | Fanaia
Hrangtintlinga | Pakhupa | Torela | Thaaia | Zarepa | Khintina | Chhuanchhira
Thathranga | Khawtinnawla | Ralzatlunga
Chhanruanga
Chhunhleia | Rorehlova
Aithanangvunga (Samtawia) | Kualsawia | Khawtindala | Zahuata (Note: Chin chief of Thlantlang)
Dokhama | Pahnuna | Nochhuma | Darbilhi
Zaduna | Lianchema | Zakapa | Pazika | Lianbuka
Lalsailova | Lalkhama

== See also ==
- Charles Stewart Murray
- Khalkam
- Lalbura
- Lushai Rising

== Sources ==
- Chatterjee, Suhas (1985). Mizoram under British Rule. Delhi: Mittal Publications.
- Chatterjee, Suhas (1995). Mizo Chiefs and the Chiefdom. New Delhi: Mittal Publications. ISBN 81-85880-72-7.
- Chatterjee, Suhas (1990). Mizo Encyclopaedia. Aizawl: Jaico Publishing House.
- Shakespear, L.W (1929). History of the Assam Rifles. London: Macmillan and Co, Limited.
- Young Mizo Association (1999). Fanai Lal huaisen Zakapa khua leh tui chanchin kal zel. Khawri: Khawri branch, YMA.
- Hluna, John Vanlal (2024). Mizo Chief Zakapa (Guardian of Mizo Women). NEIHA seminar.
