= Tirah campaign =

1897–98 frontier campaign in British India

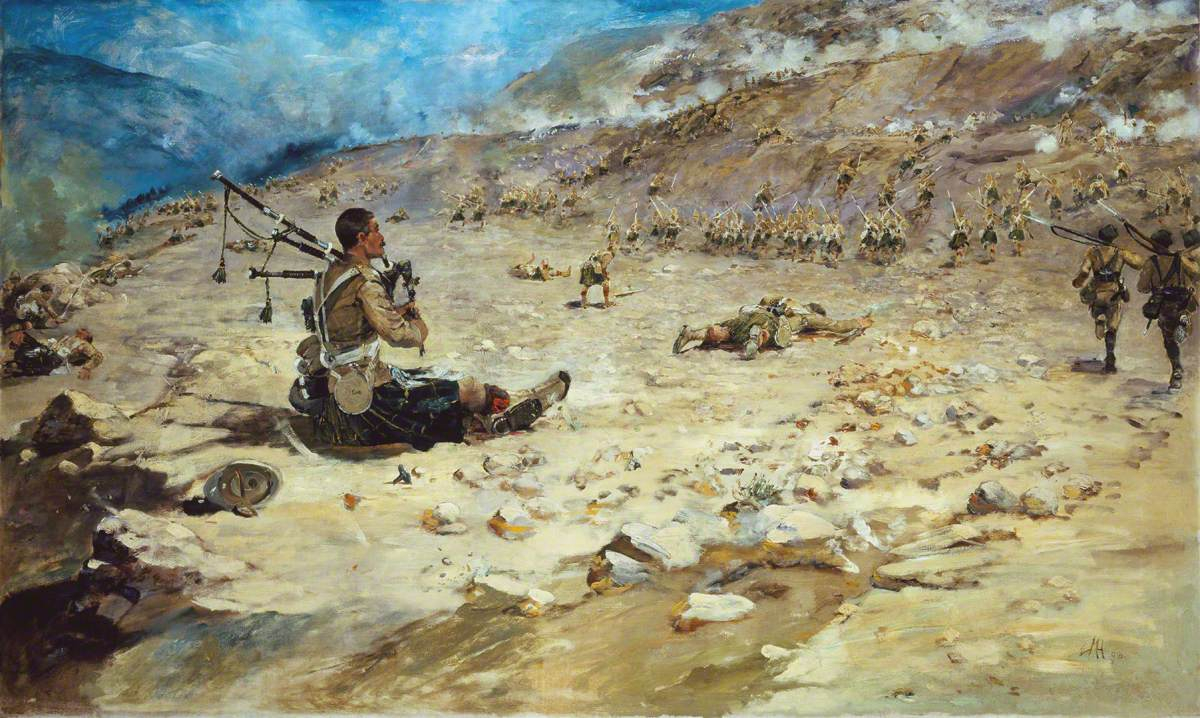
- Though wounded, Sergeant George Findlater continues to play the pipes while the Highlanders storm Dargai Heights.
Date	3 September 1897 – 4 April 1898 (7 months and 1 day)
Location	Tirah Valley, British India
Result	British-Indian victory

Belligerents
(United Kingdom of Great Britain and Ireland) British Empire; India	Afridi; Orakzai; Chamkani

Commanders and leaders
(United Kingdom of Great Britain and Ireland) William Lockhart (British Raj) Pratap Singh	Gul Badshah

Strength
34,882; 20,000 camp followers	40,000–50,000

Casualties and losses
1,150 British casualties Unknown Indian casualties	

The Tirah campaign, often referred to in contemporary British accounts as the Tirah expedition, was an Indian frontier campaign from September 1897 to April 1898. Tirah is a mountainous tract of country in what was formerly known as Federally Administered Tribal Areas of Pakistan, now Khyber Pakhtunkhwa province.

== Rebellion ==
The Afridi tribe had received a subsidy from the government of British India for the safeguarding of the Khyber Pass for sixteen years, in addition to which the government had maintained for this purpose a local regiment entirely composed of Afridi, who were stationed in the pass. Suddenly, however, the tribesmen rose, captured all the posts in the Khyber held by their own countrymen, and attacked the forts on the Samana Range near the city of Peshawar. The Battle of Saragarhi occurred at this stage when tribesmen led by Orakzai Chief Gul Badshah attacked a British fort. It was estimated that the Afridi and Orakzai could, if united, bring from 40,000 to 50,000 men into the field. The preparations for the expedition occupied some time, and meanwhile British authorities first dealt with the Mohmand rising northwest of the Khyber Pass.

== British advance ==
=== October ===
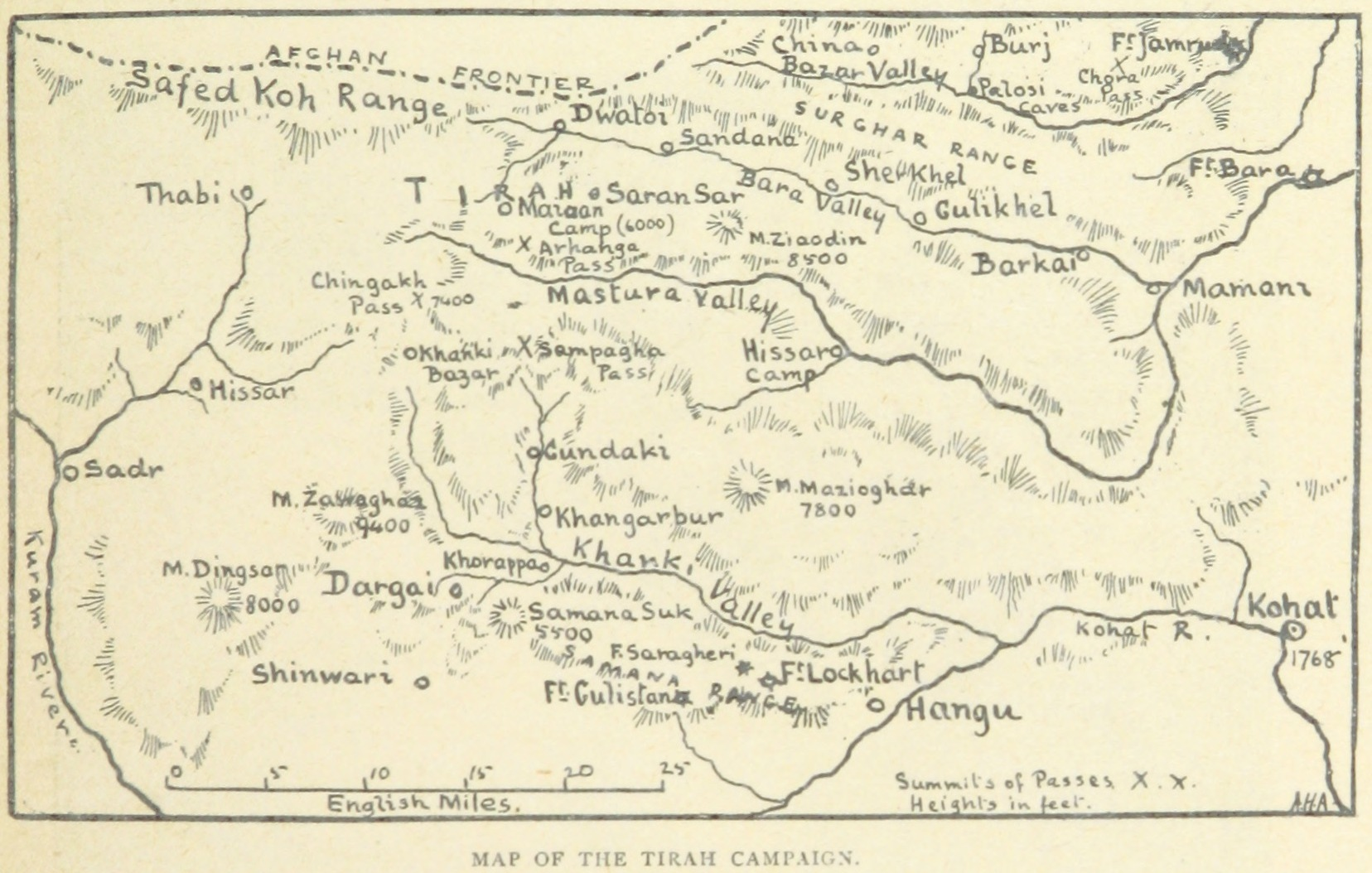
A map of places and battles in the campaign

The general commanding was General Sir William Lockhart commanding the Punjab Army Corps; he had under him 34,882 men, British and Indian, in addition to 20,000 followers. The frontier post of Kohat was selected as the base of the campaign, and it was decided to advance along a single line. On 18 October, the operations commenced, fighting ensuing immediately. The Dargai heights, which commanded the line of advance, were captured without difficulty, but abandoned owing to the want of water. On 20 October the same positions were stormed, with a loss of 199 of the British force killed and wounded. The progress of the expedition, along a difficult track through the mountains, was obstinately contested on 29 October at the Sampagha Pass leading to the Mastura valley, and on 31 October at the Arhanga Pass from the Mastura to the Tirah valley.

=== November ===
The force, in detached brigades, now traversed the Tirah district in all directions, and destroyed the walled and fortified hamlets of the Afridi. The two divisions available for this duty numbered about 20,000 men. A force about 3,200 strong commanded by Brigadier-General (afterwards Major General Sir Richard) Westmacott was first employed to attack Saran Sar, which was easily carried, but during the retirement the troops were hard pressed and had 64 casualties. On 11 November, Saran Sar was again attacked by the brigade of Brigadier-General (afterwards Sir Alfred) Gaselee. Experience enabled better dispositions to be made, and the casualties were only three.

The traversing of the valley continued, and on 13 November a third brigade under Brigadier General Francis James Kempster visited the Waran valley via the Tseri Kandao Pass. Little difficulty was experienced during the advance, and several villages were destroyed; but on 16 November, during the return march, the rearguard was hotly engaged all day, and had to be relieved by fresh troops next morning. British casualties numbered 72. Almost daily the Afridi, too wise to risk general engagements, waged continual guerrilla warfare, and troops engaged in foraging or survey duties were constantly attacked. On 21 November, a brigade under Brigadier-General Westmacott was detached to visit the Rajgul valley. The road was exceedingly difficult and steady opposition was encountered. The objectives were accomplished, but with 23 casualties during the retirement alone. The last task undertaken was the punishment of the Chamkannis, Mamuzais, and Massozais. This was carried out by Brigadier-General Gaselee, who joined hands with the Kurram movable column ordered up for the purpose. On the 29th of November a few shots were fired into headquarters camp injuring two escorts of Sir William Lockhart, including Pratap Singh of Idar, a Rajput Nobleman and orderly officer in the Army Staff. The Mamuzais and Massozais submitted immediately, but the Chamkannis offered resistance on 1 and 2 December, with about 30 British casualties.

=== December ===
The Kurram column then returned to its camp, and Lockhart prepared to evacuate Tirah, despatching his two divisions by separate routes: the first under Major-General W. Penn Symons (died 1899) to return via the Mastura valley, destroying the forts on the way, and to join at Bara, within easy march of Peshawar; the second division under Major General Yeatman Biggs (died 1898), and, accompanied by Lockhart, to move along the Bara valley. The base was thus to be transferred from Kohat to Peshawar. The return march began on 9 December. The cold was intense, 21 degrees of frost being registered before leaving Tirah. The movement of the first division though arduous was practically unopposed, but the 40 miles to be covered by the second division were contested almost throughout.

The march down the Bara valley (34 miles) commenced on 10 December, and involved four days of the hardest fighting and marching of the campaign. The road crossed and recrossed the icy stream, while snow, sleet and rain fell constantly. On the 10th, the casualties numbered about twenty. On the 11th, some fifty or sixty casualties were recorded among the troops, but many followers were killed or died of exposure, and quantities of stores were lost. On the 12th, the column halted for rest. On the 13th, the march was resumed in improved weather, though the cold was still severe. The rearguard was heavily engaged, and the casualties numbered about sixty. On the 14th, after further fighting, a junction with the Peshawar column was effected. The first division, aided by the Peshawar column, now took possession of the Khyber forts without opposition.

== Surrender ==
Negotiations for peace were then begun with the Afridis, who under the threat of another expedition into Tirah in the spring at length agreed to pay the fines and to surrender the rifles demanded. The expeditionary force was broken up on 4 April 1898. A memorable feature of this campaign was the presence in the fighting line of the Imperial Service native troops under their own officers, while several of the best known of the Indian princes served on Lockhart's staff.

== See also ==
- Tirah Memorial
