= Rorehlova =

Early Lushai chief

- Chief of Zawngte; Zawngte Lal
- Predecessor: Chhanruanga
- Successor: Aithangvunga
- Died: Lungchhuanuah
- Issue: Aithangvunga (Samtawia); Kualsawia; Khawtindala
- House: Fanai
- Father: Chhanruanga
- Religion: Sakhua

Rohrelova was a Mizo chief of the Fanai (Lai) clan in the 18th century of the Lushai Hills. He is described as one of the greatest Fanai kings. He is most well-known for his participation in the Thlanrawn massacre led by Lallula. He is the ancestor of Zakapa, who led the Lushai Rising against the British.

== Early life ==
Rorehlova was born to Chhanruanga, a Fanai chief. He had a brother named Chhunhleia. His father, Chhanruanga, possessed a sizeable village but was attacked and killed by the Thlanrawn. His brother Chhunhleia was killed soon after when attacking the Thlawnrawn for revenge. Rorehlova would be harassed by his relatives who wished to take chieftainship for themselfin his young age. Some of Rorehlova's relatives went to the Zahau and became enslaved as bawi. The custom was once the people had eaten the meat and drank the water of the Zahau, they would become in servitude to them. Rorehlova thus refused the hospitality and help of the Zahau. Rorehlova and his sister Zahluani went to Zawngte. As a result, Rorehlova became the chief of Zawngte. As the threat of a Thlanrawn invasion was still great, Rorehlova and his subjects moved into the settlement of Selesih with the Lusei chiefs. As a result, after seven generations of Fanai rule in the Tiau Valley, the Fanai chiefdoms finally migrated west. The Zawngte Pawi are named after the descendants of the Zawngte inhabitants under Rorehlova. During Selesih, Rorehlova met with Lallula after a fire broke out in the villages. Lallula took initiative and leadership and he aided in fighting the burning.

== Chieftainship ==
During Selesih, Rorehlova became acquainted with Lallula. Rorehlova would split with Lallula at Bawlte, where they promised to be brothers forever. They would dig a grave and take an oath of friendship. They threw stones in the grave and buried it. They professed that their next meeting would be in mitthi khua (land of the dead). Rorehlova informed Lallula that if the Pawis were ever to strike west then he would light a signal flame from his village. Bawtle would be established east of Zopui as a buffer chiefdom between the Lusei and Pawi. From Bawlte, Rorehlova settled in Lungkeiphaw and grew his reputation. He arranged an alliance with Nicheuva, the chief of Lungzarh. He offered his son, Sawmtawia, to marry Nicheuva's daughter, Tawlthiahi. After their marriage the alliance was finalised. Nichueva however advised Rorehlova that before migrating anywhere else, the issue of the Thlanrawn would have to be dealt with. Rorehlova invited Lallula initially but was refused. Rorehlova's mother, before her death, would send a message to Lallula that would incline him to change his mind.

As Lallula's sons expanded their power in the Lushai Hills, they began to attack the Hualngo tribes which led to the Pawi being involved. Vuta supporting his brothers would be captured by the Pawi under Zahuata. The Sailo chiefs would raise money for Vuta's ransom but Rorehlova would use part of the money to settle his own debts and tributes leading to a failure to ransom Vuta. A second raising of money would fail as not all chiefs would agree to fund another ransom attempt.

Lallula would invite the Thlawnrawn chief Thanchhuma to offer him tributes. Thanchhuma would arrive with his delegation consisting of his upa, Phunthanga and some warriors. Lallula and Rorehlova would feed them zu all night long with a feast of slain mithun. After the delegates and Thanchhuma were drunk, Lallula sounded the gong and ambushed the Thlanrawn. Most were killed with some escaping. However Thanchhuma and Phunthanga were captured and humiliated as Lallula composed songs and poems of the feat. Rorehlova managed to avenge his father and brother whom he had lost to the Thlawnrawn. After the Thlawnrawn massacre, Rorehlova would move to Cherhlunah.

The Hlawncheuho who did not wish to attack the Lusei wished to check the power of the Fanai. Rorehlova was invited to a feast where the ownership over a settlement was to take place. A feast was prepared with Zu. The Hlawncheuho did not have guns so they used a sword to ambush Rorehlova. Howevever during the struggle the sword broke in half. The Hlawncheuho considered this divine intervention. Rorehlova managed to escape during the dark of the night back to his hometown.

== Family ==
Rorehlova had three sons named Aithangvunga (Samtawia), Kualsawia and Khawtindala. His sons are considered the forefathers of the Fanai in Mizoram.

Fanai Chiefs Family Tree

Thatinkhuala
Hniarthula | Hniarchenga | Khenzahnawka | Bawitlunga
Chenhranga | Zachhuma | Hlawndawhthanga
Tluangzachhawna | Fanaia
Hrangtintlinga | Pakhupa | Torela | Thaaia | Zarepa | Khintina | Chhuanchhira
Thathranga | Khawtinnawla | Ralzatlunga
Chhanruanga
Chhunhleia | Rorehlova
Aithanangvunga (Samtawia) | Kualsawia | Khawtindala | Zahuata (Note: Chin chief of Thlantlang)
Dokhama | Pahnuna | Nochhuma | Darbilhi
Zaduna | Lianchema | Zakapa | Pazika | Lianbuka
Lalsailova | Lalkhama

== Later life ==
Rorehlova would migrate with his sons to Pangzawl. This would be followed by Zobawk to Phaileng. After Phaileng he would travel north and settle in Kawlri. From Kawlri they went to Hriangtlang before moving west into Vancheng. In Vacheng they moved to Chawngtleng and to modern day Piler Hill. Rorehlova saw his wife die during their stay at Piler Hill. From Piler Hill, Rorehlova moved to Lungchhuanah where he would die.

== Sources ==
- Fanai, Kawla (1989). Fanai Chanchin (Fanai History). Aizawl: F. Sapbawia.
- Lalthangliana, B. (1989). Mizo Lal Ropuite (in Mizo). Aizawl: R.T.M Press.
- Zokima, Reverend (1993). Mizo Lal ber Kairuma Sailo (in Mizo). Aizawl: V.L.B Press.
