= J.W.P. Peters =

British soldier and assistant governor (1864–1924)

John Weston Parsons Peters
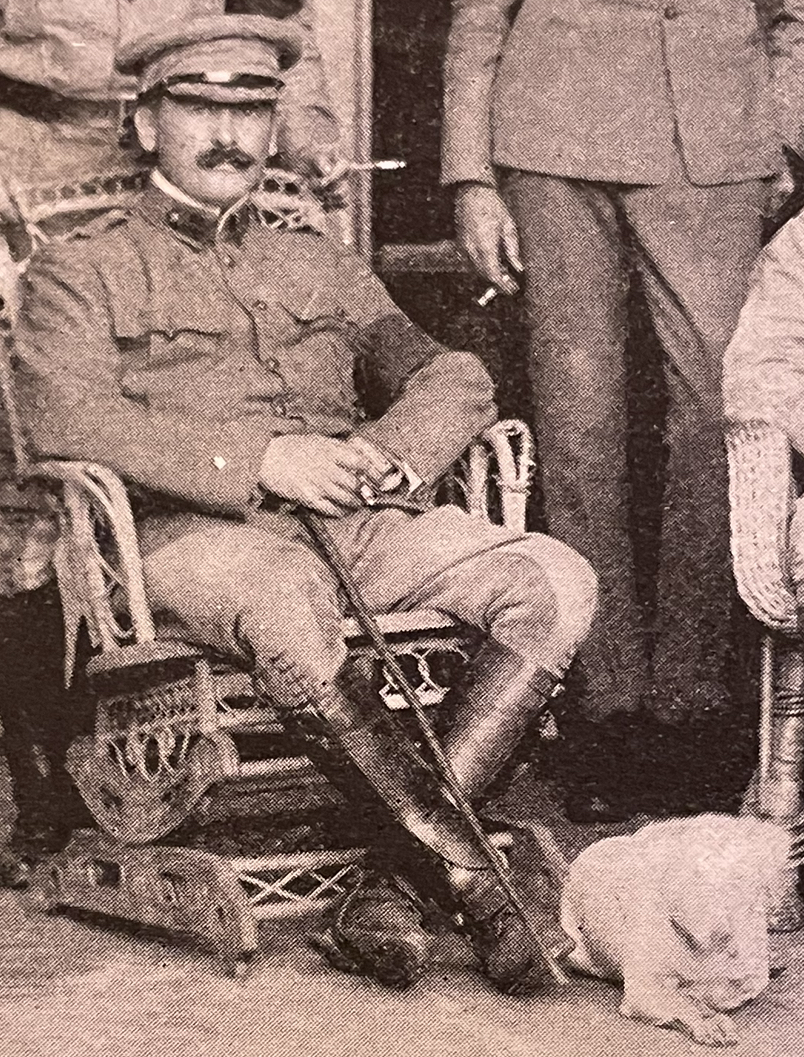
- Major J.W.P. Peters, c.1901
- Born: 23 November 1864; South Petherton, Somerset, England
- Died: 21 July 1924 (aged 59); Middlesex, England
- Relatives: Parsons family of Somerset
- Military career
- Allegiance: United Kingdom
- Branch: British Army
- Service years: 1879–1916
- Rank: Major
- Unit: 7th Dragoon Guards
- Commands: Middelburg District Command; Assistant Military Governor of Pretoria
- Conflicts: British Indian Campaigns: Chin-Lushai Expedition; Burma Campaigns; Hazara Expedition of 1891; Second Boer War: Battle of Thaba 'Nchu; Battle of Zand River; Battle of Doornkop; Battle of Diamond Hill; First World War
- Awards: Distinguished Service Order; Order of the British Empire

John Weston Parsons Peters, DSO, OBE (23 November 1864 – 21 July 1924) was a soldier of the British Army who fought in India, the Boer War, and the First World War. During the Boer War he served as Assistant Military Governor of Pretoria from 1900 to 1902 under the command of General John Maxwell.

== Early life ==
John Weston Parsons Peters was born in South Petherton, Somerset on 23 November 1864 to William Parsons Peters (1829–1902) and Eliza Mary Walters (1829–1873). His father was born William Parsons, but added the last name of Peters in 1858 in accordance with an inheritance from a maternal uncle.

Peters was educated at Winchester and was commissioned a Cornet on 22 February 1879, attending Sandhurst.

== Early Military Service ==
J.W.P. Peters was commissioned a lieutenant in the 7th Dragoon Guards on 9 May 1885, and was posted on special service to India and Burma. He served on the Chin-Lushai Expedition from 1889 to 1890 and was awarded the India General Service Medal with the Chin Lushai clasp. Peters was then appointed the Superintendent of signaling and Provost Marshal for the Hazara Expedition of 1891.

In February 1891, Lieutenant Peters took command of the signalers of the 2nd Seaforth Highlanders, 11th Bengal Infantry, 27th Punjab Infantry, 32nd Pioneers, and 37th Dogras being stationed at the fort at Rawalpindi. Colonel E.O.F. Hamilton reported that "My assistants, Lieutenant Peters, 7th Dragoon Guards, and Lieutenant Burrowes, Royal Irish Fusiliers, have rendered me every assistance. Both are active and zealous officers." Peters was placed in command of the signalers with the 2nd Brigade, and made all arrangements for signaling in that brigade.

At the end of the campaign, the General Officer Commanding the Hazara Field Force stated: "Captain Hamilton will, no doubt, bring to the notice of the Quarter Master General in India all points requiring attention, and I need not repeat them here. I endorse his favourable mention of Lieutenant Peters and Burrowes and the non- commissioned staff.". For his service in the Hazara Expedition, he was awarded another clasp to the India General Service Medal.

Peters continued to serve in the campaigns in Burma and India until 1892, being awarded a third clasp to his India General Service Medal for Burma 1889–92, and on 31 March 1891 was promoted to captain in the 7th Dragoons.

== Boer War ==
By early 1900, Peters was a Major and served as second-in-command of the 7th Dragoons as they embarked for service in South Africa. He was appointed to the Staff of the 4th Cavalry Brigade as the Brigade-Major, serving in that capacity from 26 May to 25 July 1900, fighting at the Battle of Thaba 'Nchu, Battle of Zand River, Battle of Doornkop, and the Battle of Diamond Hill.

He fought bravely at the Battle of Thaba 'Nchu in April 1900, with the regimental history of the 7th Dragoons stating: "The conspicuous gallantry shown by Captain Haig brings to mind the cool manner in which Major Peters fought the machine gun earlier in the day [at Thaba 'Nchu], sighting and firing it himself without cover and under a heavy fire."

At the end of July 1900, Peters was appointed as the District Commissioner for Middelburg, serving in that capacity until 20 November 1900. He proved himself a very capable staff officer and administrator and was soon appointed to the staff of General John Maxwell, the Military Governor of Pretoria. Peters served as Assistant Military Governor of Pretoria, also working as assistant to the superintendent of native affairs, from November 1900 until the end of the war in May 1902. He was lauded as an efficient and successful administrator and "distinguished himself for his administrative capacity."

Peters was involved in the administration of various concentration camps and the scorched earth policies around Pretoria, and was involved in the issue of removing natives from their villages to the camps. In a letter from Peters dated 14 October 1901, he stated that "General Kitchener ordered all native stads, or villages, to be destroyed and the inhabitants removed to refugee camps". This had quite an effect on the conduct of the war, and eventually contributed to the Boer surrender.

== Later Service ==
Following the peace in South Africa in 1902, he was posted to Hong Kong and Egypt, retiring from the Army in 1911.

On the outbreak of the First World War in August 1914, Peters was placed on active service and attached to the Staff of the Deputy Assistant Adjutant and Quarter Master General (D.A.A. & Q.M.G.) on 14 September with the rank of Major. He served with the D.A.A. & Q.M.G. until 2 March 1916. For his services in the First World War as a staff officer, Peters was mentioned in dispatches four times and award the Distinguished Service Order on 14 January 1916, as well as the Order of the British Empire.

== Personal life ==
In October 1895, Peters was involved in a minor scandal in England. A man named John Corrie Woolston accused his wife Emily Jane of adultery and petitioned for divorce naming Capt. John Weston Parsons Peters as one of the co-respondents. The other co-respondent was Louis Philippe Robert, Duke of Orleans, who was claimant to the throne of France. Emily Jane Woolston was the sister of Florence 'Kitty' Jewell, who was involved in her own famous scandal when she fell in love with and married the son of King Lobengula while touring with P.T. Barnum's Savage South Africa. The petition against Peters and Prince Philippe was dismissed a few months later on 10 March 1896.

In 1904, he was married to Mary 'Minnie' Bertram Brunton, from Edinburgh. Minnie died in Deal, Kent in 1922.

John Weston Parsons Peters died on 21 July 1924 in Middlesex. His sisters Elizabeth Rodie Thompson and Ellen Rosy Gillespy were appointed as the administrators of his estate which was valued at over £9,000.

Elizabeth Rodie Thompson's son, (J.W.P. Peters' nephew), was Lt. George S.R. Thompson, who was killed at the Aisne on 14 September 1914, while serving with the King's Royal Rifle Corps.

== Awards and decorations ==
Ribbon bars of J.W.P. Peters

Companion of the Distinguished Service Order (DSO)	1916
Officer of the Order of the British Empire (OBE) (Military Division)	1916
India General Service Medal	*Chin-Lushai 1889-90; *Burma 1889-92; *Hazara 1891
Queen's South Africa Medal	*Cape Colony; *Orange Free State; *Johannesburg; *Diamond Hill
King's South Africa Medal	*South Africa 1901; *South Africa 1902
1914 Star	
British War Medal	
Victory Medal (United Kingdom)	with bronze oak leaf for MID
