= Richard Westmacott (Indian Army officer) =

British military officer

Sir Richard Westmacott
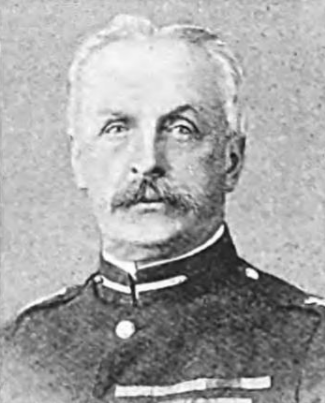
- Born: 16 March 1841
- Died: 28 February 1925 (aged 83)
- Military career
- Allegiance: United Kingdom
- Branch: British Indian Army
- Rank: Major-General
- Conflicts: Indian Mutiny; Second Afghan War; Soudan Expedition; Tirah Campaign
- Awards: Knight Commander of the Order of the Bath; Distinguished Service Order

Major-General Sir Richard Westmacott KCB DSO (16 March 1841 – 28 February 1925) was an officer in the British Bombay Army and after its amalgamation in the British Indian Army.

== Biography ==
Richard Westmacott was born on 16 March 1841. The son of the Reverend Horatio Westmacott, he was educated at Rossal. He entered the Bombay Army in 1859 and served in the Indian Mutiny (1857–1858).

Westmacott served in the Second Afghan War between 1879 and 1880, and Soudan Expedition in 1885. He commanded the Advance Column on the Chin Lushai Expedition, 1889 to 1890. He commanded the 28th Bombay Pioneers from 1887 to 1894 and he was assistant adjutant-general in Poona, 1894–1895.

Westmacott was Colonel on the Staff 1895–1896, and commanded the Nagpur District from 1896 to 1899. During this time he also commanded 1st Field Force in 1897 and 4th Brigade on the Tirah Campaign (1897–1898). He was promoted Major-General 20 June 1899. Commanding First Class District. Mhow, 1900–1903. He was appointed Colonel, 128th Pioneers in 1904.

Westmacott was appointed a Knight Commander of the Order of the Bath in 1898 and awarded the Distinguished Service Order in 1890.

== Family ==
In 1889, Westmacott married Rose Margaret, daughter of Major-General Francis James Caldecott, C.B. They had one son Guy Randolph Westmacott (born 1891) D.S.O who joined the British Army and served as an officer in the Grenadier Guards during the Great War before transferring to the Royal Air Force as shortly before the war ended in 1918. He may have been a Senior British Intelligence Officer during the Second World War.
