= Charles Stewart Murray =

Bengal Police Superintendent (1858-1903)

Charles Stewart Murray CIE

Superintendent of the Lushai Hills (South)
- In office 1 April 1891 – 16 April 1891
- Monarch: Queen Victoria
- Governor General: Lord Lansdowne
- Preceded by: Position created
- Succeeded by: John Shakespear

Personal details
- Born: December 4, 1858 Woolwich, Kent, England
- Died: May 4, 1903 (aged 44) Darjeeling, West Bengal, British Raj
- Spouse: Laura Susan Prestage (m. 1892)
- Relations: Brigadier General Alexander Henry Murray (Father); Martha Frances Vincent Murray (b. Davenport, Mother)
- Children: Commander Archie Alastair Stewart Murray; Alastair Donald Stewart Murray; Charles Stewart Murray (jr); Challiana (Reverend - Illegitimate)
- Known for: Political Officer of the South Lushai Hills
- Awards: Companion of the Order of the Indian Empire

Military service
- Allegiance: United Kingdom
- Rank: Superintendent
- Unit: Bengal Police
- Battles/wars: Chin-Lushai Expedition; Lushai Rising

Charles Stewart Murray CIE (4 December 1858- 4 May 1903) was a superintendent of police in the British Raj. Murray participated in the Chin-Lushai Expedition. Murray assisted John Shakespear, the field officer of the southern column in the expedition. After the annexation of the Lushai Hills, Murray was assigned as the first superintendent of the South Lushai Hills. However, his mishandling of authority with the Lushai tribes, such as Zakapa, and his demands for sexual corvée would see him transferred to an assistant commissioner of the Chittagong Hill Tracts.

== Early life ==
Charles Stewart Murray was born on 4 December 1858 in Woolwich, Kent in England. He was the second son of Briagder-General Alexander Henry Murray and Martha Frances Vincent Murray. He was a sibling to three more brothers: Alexander Charles Henry Gerald Murray, Cyril Francis Tyrrel Murray and Malcome Donald Donald Murray.

== Career ==
Charles Stewart Murray joined the Bengal Police in India, where he was appointed Superintendent of Police for the Chittagong Hill Tracts. Murray's successes in fighting the Bhutias and Lepchas gained him a reputation as a competent frontier officer. Murray held the position until 1888 where he was assigned as political officer to the Chin-Lushai Expedition under Colonel Tregear. Murray would hold a durbar with the chiefs in the Lushai language at Fort Lungleh. He would also make allies with chiefs such as Mompunga and Seipuia. On 1 April 1891 Murray was assigned political officer to the South Lushai Hills. He would have a salary of ₹700-₹1,000 with a fixed travel allowance of ₹150.

Murray's administration over the south Lushai Hills would last for 16 days before he would be transferred. Murray's duty as a political officer consisted of introducing house taxes and obligating chiefs to supply labour to construct roads and infrastructure. When tensions between Zakapa and Murray escalated into a South Lushai rising, the British originally considered the issue as a resistance to supplying the labour quota. However, the true cause was uncovered in judicial proceedings against Murray, who was accused of trying to procure women for sex and after Zakapa was unable to supply his demand, he threatened to take his wife. Zakapa reasonably believed Murray to carry out the threat. As a result, the following day, Murray interrupted Zakapa in his Zawlbuk as he was in a conference with Lalthuama. Murray dispersed Lalthuama to talk with Zakapa alone. After the conversation, Murray left the zawlbuk to burn down the rice stock of the village. The Lushais armed themselves and began to shoot at Murray and his envoy from all directions. Murray's guards were killed, and his assistant, Mr Taylor, was severely wounded as a result. Murray escaped through a hillstream and abandoned his men, ammunition, money and luggage. The absence of Murray for a few days and the unrest of Zakapa and the southern chiefs led to Captain Hutchinson to pacify the settlement.

After the Lushai Rising and fallout with Zakapa, a court case into his conduct demoted Murray for destabilizing the Lushai Hills. The proceedings against him ended on 10 February 1892, when his conduct was responsible for the deaths of two sepoys, a naik, two army signallers and a private servant. As a result, the court deemed him unfit to hold the position of political officer of the South Lushai Hills. Murray was sent to work as assistant commissioner in Chittagong under the discretion of John Edgar. Murray was later sent to work as district superintendent of police as Darjeeling, where he would work until his sudden death.

== Family and later life ==
Charles Stewart Murray married Laura Susan Prestage, daughter of Franklin Prestage on 4 January 1892. He had three sons, Alastair Donald Stewart Murray, Charles Stewart Murray and Archie Alastair Stewart Murray.

Due to Murray's sexual corvée and assaults on women, a Mizo woman, Thangtei, conceived and gave birth to a half Mizo boy known as Challiana. The rumours would reach the missionaries James Herbert Lorrain and Frederick William Savidge who would take Challiana into their care believing a Mizo woman could not raise a half white child. He grew up into a translator, pastor and medical assistant. His clan in the registry was listed as Sâp (British).

Charles Stewart Murray died on 4 May 1903 at age 44. Murray fell down dead during a dance at the Darjeeling amusements club, where he was secretary.

== Sources ==
- Chatterjee, Suhas (1985). British rule in Mizoram. New Delhi: Mittal Publications.
- Chatterjee, Suhas (1990). Mizo Encyclopaedia. Aizawl: Jaico Publishing House.
- Chatterjee, Suhas (1995). Mizo Chiefs and the Chiefdom. New Delhi: Mittal Publications. ISBN 81-85880-72-7.
- London Medals. "The important January 1891 Companion of the Order of the Indian Empire and Chin-Lushai 1889-90 Expedition pair awarded to Mr. Charles Stewart Murray, Bengal Police, the Superintendent of Police for the Chittagong Hill Tracts, and Assistant Political Offic". London Medals. London.
- Reid, Robert Neil (1942). The lushai hills: culled from History of the frontier areas bordering on Assam from 1883-1941. Aizawl: Tribal Research Institute.
- The Times (28 May 1903). "Obituary". The Times. No. 37092. London. p. 8.
- MyHeritage. "Charles Stewart Murray". MyHeritage.
- Jackson, Kyle (2023). The Mizo Discovery of the British Raj. Vancouver: Cambridge University Press.
- Jackson, Kyle (2015). "14. Hearing images, tasting pictures: making sense of Christian mission photography in the Lushai Hills district, Northeast India". In Kominko, Maja (ed.). From Dust to Digital: Ten Years of the Endangered Archives Programme. United Kingdom: Open Book Publishers.
- Shakespear, L.W (1929). History of the Assam Rifles. London: Macmillan and Co, Limited.
