= Paris Exposition =

Paris Exposition or Paris Exhibition can refer to

- French Industrial Exposition of 1844
- Exposition des produits de l'industrie française, held intermittently from 1798 to 1849
- Exposition Universelle (1855), the Paris Exposition of 1855
- Exposition Universelle (1867), the Paris Exposition of 1867
- Exposition Universelle (1878), the Paris Exposition or Paris World's Fair of 1878
- Exposition Universelle (1889), the Paris Exposition of 1889
- Exposition Universelle (1900), the Paris Exposition of 1900
- International Exposition of Modern Industrial and Decorative Arts, the Paris Exposition of 1925
- Paris Colonial Exposition, the Paris Exposition of 1931
- Exposition Internationale des Arts et Techniques dans la Vie Moderne, the Paris Exposition of 1937
