= Vincent William Tregear =

British Army officer (1842-1925)

Major-General Sir Vincent William Tregear KCB
- Born: June 25, 1842; Juanpore, West Bengal, British Raj
- Died: July 17, 1925 (aged 83); Portsmouth, Hampshire, England
- Spouse: Jane Charlotte Bell (m. 1867; died 1899)
- Children: 5
- Relatives: Vincent William Henry Tregear (Father); Elizabeth Hannah Tregear (Mother)
- Military career
- Allegiance: United Kingdom
- Branch: Army
- Rank: Major-General
- Known for: Chin-Lushai Expedition
- Conflicts: Second Anglo-Afghan War; Chin-Lushai Expedition

Major-General Sir Vincent William Tregear, KCB (25 June 1842 - 17 June 1925) was a British army officer.

The son of Vincent Tregear of the Indian Educational Department, he was educated privately. He entered the Bengal Army in 1859.

He was appointed a Major in 1879, Brevet Lieutenant Colonel in 1884, Lieutenant-Colonel in 1885, and Colonel in 1888. He was appointed a Major-General in 1897 and retired in the same year. He was transferred to the Unemployed Supernumerary List in 1902.

Tregear commanded the 9th Bengal Infantry and was Colonel on the Staff at Multan from 1895-97.

He served in the Second Anglo-Afghan War, 1879-80 and took part in the Chin-Lushai Expedition for both the expedition of 1888 and the expedition of 1889-1890. For his services in the Chin-Lushai Expedition, he was appointed a Companion of the Order of the Bath (CB) in 1890.

He married Jane Charlotte (died 1899), daughter of William Oswald Bell, in 1867.

He was appointed a Knight Commander of the Order of the Bath in the 1909 Birthday Honours.

== Sources ==
- Rao, C. Hayavadana, ed. (1915). "Tregear, Major-General Sir Vincent William" . The Indian Biographical Dictionary . Vol. 21.6. Madras: Pillar & Co. p. 430.
- Peters, Larry. "Vincent William Tregear". MyHeritage.
