= Chin-Lushai Expedition =

British punitive expedition to annex the Lushai and Chin Hills

Chin-Lushai Expedition of 1889–90
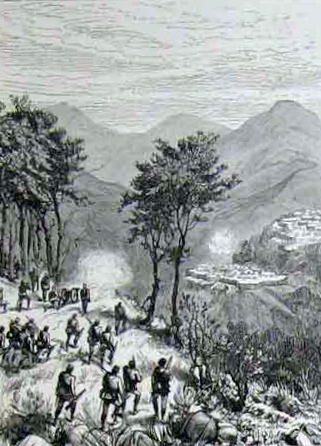
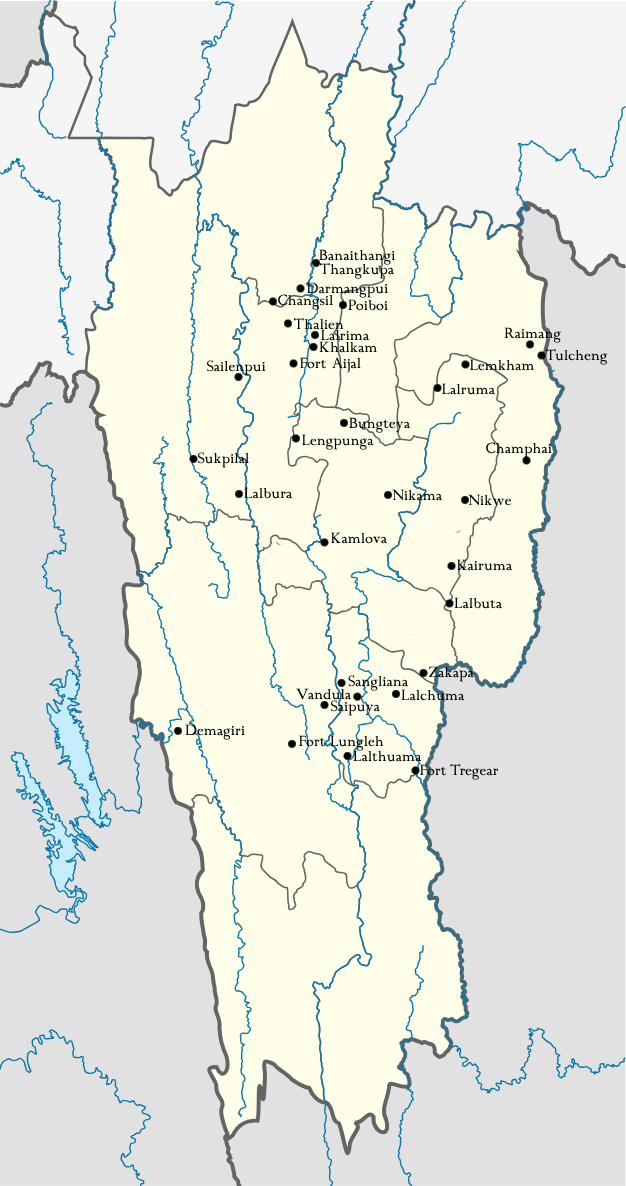
- Artillery shells fired on Pâwibâwia's settlement Map of settlements and Lusai chiefs in 1890
Date	15 November 1889 – 30 April 1890
Location	Chin Hills and Lushai Hills
Result	British victory Annexation of Lushai Hills; Lushai Rising

Belligerents
British Raj	Tribes of the Chin Hills and Lushai Hills

Commanders and leaders
(British Raj) Maj.Gen. William Symons (British Raj) Col. Charles McD. Skene DSO (British Raj) Col. Vincent William Tregear	Lushai Commanders: Hausata; Zahuata; Dokulha; Khalkam; Lianphunga; Zahrawka; Kairûma; Nikama; Chin Commanders:

Strength
3,608 British and Indian troops	10,000+

Casualties and losses
3 officers 78 soldiers 916 invalided	500+

The Chin-Lushai Expedition of 1889–90 was a British punitive expedition in Burma and India against the tribes of the Chin Hills and Lushai Hills.

== Background ==
=== Lushai ===
Following the Lushai Expedition of 1871–72, the border regions of Burma and India remained relatively peaceful with few raids occurring.

==== Murder of Captain Stewart ====
Lieutenant J.F Stewart of the 1st Battalion, Leinster Regiment accompanied by J.Mc.D Baird of the 2nd Battalion, Derbyshire Regiment was making a survey to the south-east of Rangamati for the building of a new road to be constructed. Stewart was to work southwards from Rangamati where Baird from Demagiri would meet up with him.

Stewart was accompanied by two men of his own regiment, Lance-Corporal McCormik and Private Owens along with a corporal and ten Gurkha sepoys of the border police. He departed from Rangamati on 16 January. On 18 January, a friendly chief named Saipuialal warned C.S Murray, who relayed to Stewart of movements of war parties in the area. Stewart did not heed the warning due to several 'wolf' cries of war parties around Demagiri before. On the 2nd of February he received news while encamped of a second impending raid but did not regard it seriously; he even declined to post a sentry. Furthermore, five of his sepoys had been sent to bring elephants, letters and logistics.

In the early morning, most of the sepoys were awake with two asleep. Stewart got ready and dressed before a volley was shot. The two sleeping corporals were stabbed in their sleep. The shot which was fired hit a sepoy in the thigh breaking his bone. Two more shots followed in which one wounded an escort on the arm. Stewart's servants and coolies ran away along with one sepoy. Stewart was made to fight with two European soldiers, Commander Naick Kali Sing and Sepoy Gaja Ram. The two European soldiers failed to defend due to the ammunition of their rifles being taken with the escaping coolies. The party was outnumbered as there were an estimated 200-300 Lushais surrounding the encampment. Hausata father-in-law, Jahoota had also provided men in the raid.

Stewart fired shots at the attackers after emerging from the hut with his revolver and breech-loading gun. The Lushais were said to have numbered 300 and armed with a mix of muskets, spears and daos. The commander and sepoy aided him in returning shots to the attackers. Stewart retired to the hillside and continued shooting. However, Stewart was wounded in the chest by a bullet and died instantly. The two sepoys escaped after Stewart's death. The Lushais took the guns of the camp as a result. The Commissioner to Chittagong placed a reward of Rs. 200 to find Stewart's body, which a party of hillmen found and reported on the 25th of February. Stewart was found headless similar to other victims of the attack. Stewart's body which fell off the edge of the ravine had been tightly bound in bamboo and difficult to release from.

An investigation revealed that the motive was not an anti-British one, but a Lushai custom. The chief responsible, Hausata had been obligated by his father-in-law Zahuata to bring him heads to prove himself as a son-in-law after a marital dispute. It was deduced that the war party had come upon Stewart's camp by chance, which was unguarded.

==== Murder of Pakuma Chieftainess ====
Pakuma Rani was a British ally and chieftainess on the border near the Chittagong Hill Tracts. Within 10 days of the murder of Captain Stewart, the Lushais made a raid on Pakuma's settlement. They took away fifteen captives and thirteen heads of the slain inhabitants. In the course of the raid, Pakuma was also killed by the raiders. Pakuma had actually been under the protection of the British. She had moved her settlement of 150 households within the jurisdiction of British territory out of fear of Sailo chiefs wishing to raid.

Lieutenant Widdicombe urged for punishment of this raid. The Government of Bengal believed that Khalkam was responsible for the raid on Pakuma Rani. An enquiry made by Rai Bahadur Haricharan Sharma led to the conclusion that Khalkam was not responsible. The sons of the Eastern Lushai chief Vûta were responsible, such as Nikama, Lungliana and possibly Kairûma. The government decided that, instead of a simple punitive expedition, the new circumstances of the annexation of Upper Burma in 1886 exposed that the Lushai Hills and Chin Hills on all sides must be considered. Hence an objective for annexation and pacification of the chiefdoms was decided.

==== Chengri Valley raid ====
In January 1888, the Government of Bengal received reports of a raid on Chengri Valley. The raid saw 24 villages consisting of 545 houses burnt down. The raid killed 101 inhabitants and captured 91 individuals in total. Most of the captives consisted of children and mothers who were killed as they were unable to walk with their captors. The British attributed the raid to Lianphunga and Zahrâwka, two sons of Suakpuilala. John Edgar, Bengal's chief secretary, outlined that the Shendus (Southern Mizos referring to Lai and Mara) needed to be reduced to submission.

=== Chin Hills ===
Following the Third Anglo-Burmese War, in 1886 the possessions of the King of Burma were transferred to the British. This included the tributes from the Kale, Kabaw and Yay valleys which were semi-independent. The Shan State of Kale was in a civil war between Maung Yit and his nephew Maung Pa Gyi. The British deposed Maung Yit and appointed Maung Pa Gyi in January 1887. Knowing the Chin were raiding the Shans, the British sent Captain Raikes, the Deputy Commissioner of Upper Chindwin, to open negotiations with the Chins.

Captain Raike met with Sizang representatives and explained the need for cessation of raids. Captain Raikes warned of no future raids and allowed for the slaves from recent raids to be retained as it had occurred before British authority took over the Shan state of Kale. The Chins were assured of friendly intentions and to cease raids. During negotiations with Haka and Zokhua tensions began to boil. A messenger of Captain Eyre sent Shwe Hlaing, an illegitimate chief's son, to open negotiations. He proclaimed that with the British he would be installed as Chief of Zokhua. This led to arrests of three messenger with two dying and Hlaing escaping. The Haka then made two raids killing eight and capturing 28 into slavery. The Sizang attacked a party of Shan at Kale killing one and capturing four. The Tlaisun made two serious raids in Kale in early 1888. This was followed by another in October 1888. The Sizang made five raids and the Kamhau made one raid. The CHins captured 122 Shans, killed 12 and wounded 14 in a span of 12 days.

The matter escalated when in October 1887, a Burmese pretender, Shwe Gyo Byu Mintha, raised a rebellion against the British in the Chindwin, Mingyan and Pagan districts. British officers Captain Beville and Major Kennedy were killed. Mintha fled into the Chin Hills and made asylum under a Tlaisun chief. The British sent an ultimatum to give up Mintha and sent similar orders to the Sizang to free their captives. The Chins refused all orders and requests.

== Order of Battle ==
Burma Field Force
Column	Regiment	Number of Men
Northern Column	Col. Charles McD. Skene DSO	
	1st Battalion, Cheshire Regiment	300
	42nd Gurkha Light Infantry	477
	5th Company, Queen's Own Madras Sappers and Miners	95
	10th Bengal Infantry	460
	38th Bengal Infantry	290
Southern Column	Gen. William P. Symons	
	1st Battalion, King's Own Scottish Borderers	500
	1st Bengal Mountain Artillery	84
	6th Company, Queen's Own Madras Sappers and Miners	151
	2nd Battalion, 4th Gurkhas	410
	2nd Madras Native Infantry	630

Chittagong Field Force
Column	Regiment	Number of Men
Chittagong Column	Col. V.W. Tregear	
	2nd Battalion, 2nd Gurkhas	300
	3rd Bengal Infantry	250
	Detachment, 9th Bengal Infantry	
	28th Bombay Pioneers	102
	2nd Company, Bengal Sappers and Miners	80
	Detachment, Chittagong Frontier Police	50

== Lushai Campaign ==
The Chin-Lushai Expedition consisted of two expeditions. The expedition of 1889 focussed on the prevention of Lushai raids and punishing Hausata's killing of Lt Stewart. The Chin-Lushai Expedition of 1889-90 was focused on the punishment of chiefs, releasing the captives taken in 1883 of a Lushai village and recovering weapons from the tribes and specifically focussed on freeing captives from the Chengri Valley raid.

=== Hausata's Punitive Expedition ===
General Treager assembled a column known as the "Lushai Expeditionary Force," in Demagiri. Three objectives were outlined for the Lushai column.

- To construct a road in the direction of Shendu country.
- To punish Hausata and Zahuata for the murder of Lieutenant Stewart.
- To establish an advanced post to be garrisoned during the season.

The original order didn't sanction a punitive expedition on Hausata but this was modified by telegram on 12 March. The troops were assisted by 2,500 Chakma and Bengali coolies. They had been hired for the construction of a road from Demagiri to Lungleh. The Chakma coolies were originally intended to build encampments and huts for the sepoys until this task was delegated to the column directly. The construction of the road began on 16 January and was completed to Fort Lungleh on 11 March 1889. The path allowed for elephants to cross the terrain and for logistics to arrive smoothly. C.S Murray was allied with a local Lushai chief known as Saipuialal who supplied the column and auxiliaries with guides to his elder brother Vandula's village. The officers met with Vandula who supplied information about Shendu preparations in defending themselves which turned out to be false.

Another British ally was a friendly chieftess known as Darbilhi. Darbilhi supplied guides to nearby villages for C.S Murray to gather intelligence on Hausata. During these investigations reports surfaced that Hausata had already died and had been buried with Stewart's gun. Furthermore, the heads taken during the attack on Stewart and his party had been sent to a chief named Paona for safekeeping. Paona was one of the five chiefs implicated in the raid alongside Hausata, his two sons and Zahuata. Two chiefs known as Dahuta and Zakapa sent delegates in an offer for submission during the column's activities. The delegates were informed that Colonel General Tregear would make the terms of peace. The reasoning for the submission of the two chiefs were described as the spreading of news of the Chin column's activities in destroying the Chin tribes.

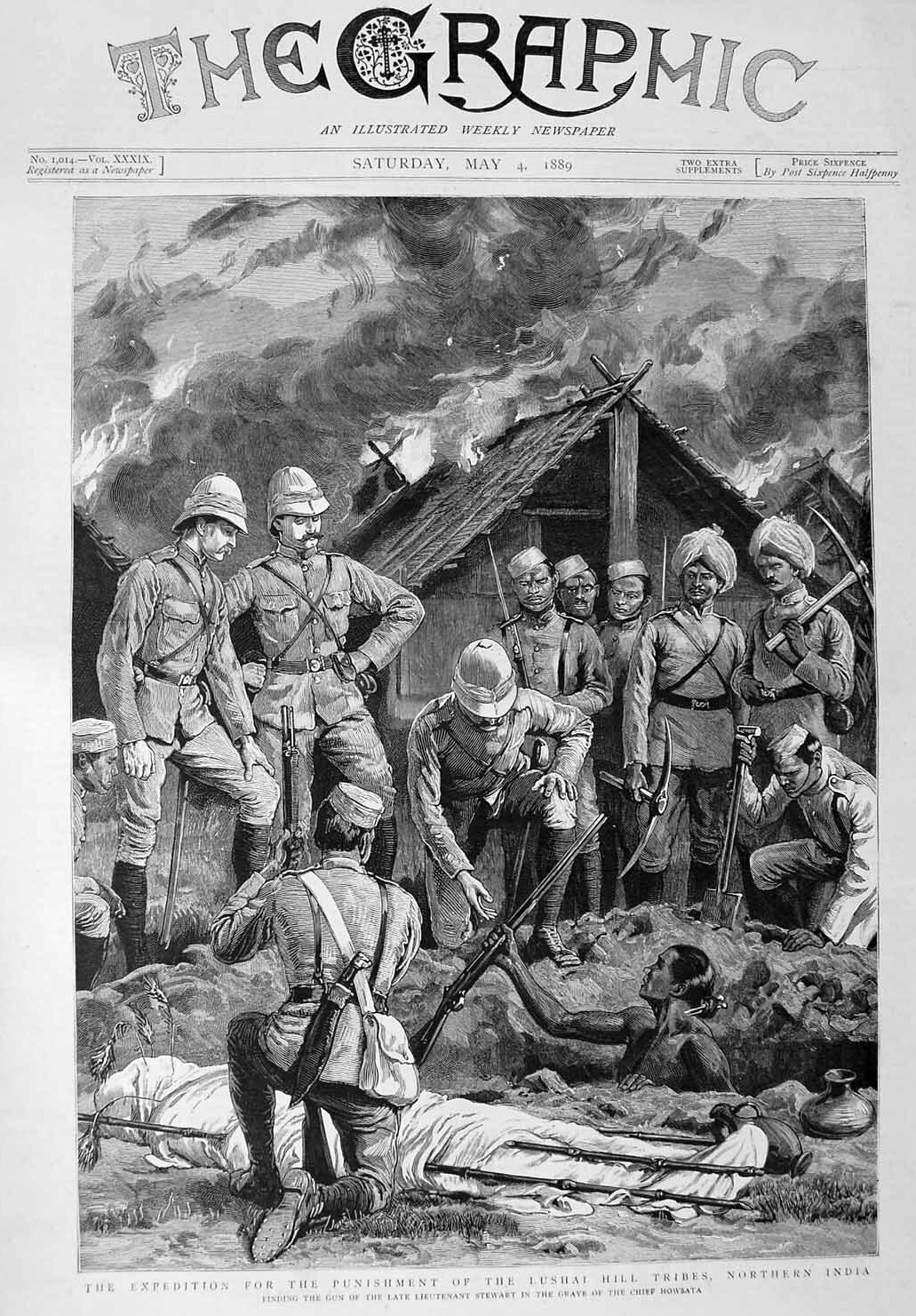
Finding the gun of the late Lieutenant Stewart in the grave of the Chief Hausata, The Graphic 1889

The column was divided into two parties who encamped around Hausata's village. The original plan for a nighttime ambush was aborted on account of Darbilhi's guides being unable to navigate the terrain in the dark. The force arrived at Hausata's village on the 20th. The Lushais in Hausata's village fired a signalling shot to burn down the houses. The force, in return, fired a few volleys and shots to halt the burning of the settlement. The village was deserted on arrival, with only two undefended stockades smeared with the blood of a dog to deter the advance. The guides identified the largest building as the chief's house and located Hausata's grave. Hausata was found dressed in robes and a turban. His grave was filled with his weapons, a power flask and some food for his journey in Pialrâl. Underneath Hausata, the column located Stewart's double-barreled gun. The column left his village and burned down Zahuata's village on its way to Lungleh.

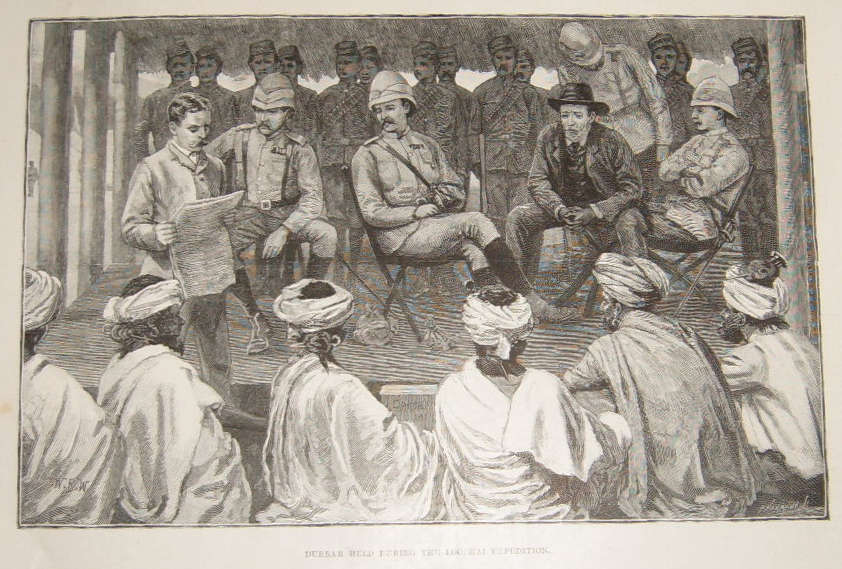
A durbar of Lushai chiefs held after the Chin-Lushai Expedition.

In good faith, the British ally Saipuialal had given his old village to the British to develop Fort Lungleh. After the Fort was developed with the amenities required, it was handed over to the Frontier police on 15 April to form a garrison. Before leaving the Lushai Hills, a durbar was held at Fort Lungleh. Five Lushai chiefs attended, namely, Saipuialal, Lal Thuabunga, Lal Lunga, Sangliena and Lal Ruma. C.S Murray addressed the chiefs in the Mizo language and explained the expedition and its causes. The durbar ended with rewards given to the chiefs for their aid and cooperation with the British.

=== Lianphunga's Punitive Expedition ===
Two columns were established. A northern column under Colonel G.J Skinner and a southern column under General V.W Tregear were established. Both columns were given separate objectives. The objectives for the northern column were:

- To punish Lianphungaa for the raid on Chengri Valley.
- To punish the sons of Vûta for their raid and murder of Pakuma Rani.
- To establish a permanent outpost near Lianphunga's village as a garrison point.

The objectives of the Southern column were:

- The construction of a mule path to Haka to establish a road between Burma and India.
- The establishment of outposts on the route to secure complete pacification and annexation.
- The subjugation of tribes who are neutral into the sphere of British influence.

Many of the troops and elephants and coolies along the journeying began to develop afflictions from diseases such as Malaria, Cholera and a native disease known as Lurza. General Tregear arrived at Fort Lungleh on 24 December. Tregear presided over the surrender of Hausata's brother's, Dokulha and Vantura through a chief known as Lalruma. The chiefs had surrendered their guns and released their captives. They further offered to help cut through the jungle on the way to Haka.

Concerns were made about the invasion of the Lushai Hills and the inseucrity it may cause on the tea estates bordering the frontier. The plan was made to defend the Cachar frontier, occupy Changsil and attack Liangphunga with Manipuri coolies from the Burma side.

=== Southern Column ===
Captain John Shakespear accompanied C.S Murray to bring in all the chiefs who had neglected or refused to submit to British rule. Tensions were raised with Lalthuama, son of Ropuiliani and Vandula who was an influential chief among the Shendus. Rumours had formed of Lalthuama's involvement in anti-British chiefs. His harboring of the chief Paona who stored the heads of Captain Stewart's party. As the road builders came closer to Lalthuama's village, Murray was granted a further 100 men to set relations right with Lalthuama.

Murray reached a dependent village under Lalthuama which was deserted as a new settlement was being built nearby for jhumming purposes. Lalthuama upon entering his village was tied up by the party and returned to his main village. Lalthuama was fined 30 guns, a gayal, 10 pigs, 10 goats, 20 fowls and 100 maunds of rice. The force hunted some of the animals in the village and took Lalthuama to Fort Lungleh until the full extent of the fine would be paid off. Lalthuama arrived at Fort Lungleh on 19 January 1890. He managed to provide the 30 guns in the fine on 21 January, however spoke of difficulties in procuring so much rice. Lalthuama was permitted to return home on his promise that he will provide the amount of rice in the fine at an encampment for the forces at Mat river.

Captain Brown, Shakespear, Mulaly, Lieutenant Bythell and Mr Walker who were encamped on Mat River began a journey to Darbilhi's village. The news of Lalthuama's arrest had made Darbilhi hesitant to meet with the party, and she had fled to another settlement. The party reached the settlement where Darbilhi resided after fleeing on 4 January 1890. An oath of friendship was taken between Darbilhi and John Shakespear. Through Darbilhi, messages were sent to Hausata's brothers, Dokulha and Vantura, to come and meet with the party.

The party was met by Vantura's men upon their return journey on 7 February. The men stated Vantura was close by and wished to surrender. Vantura himself revealed himself and gave Lieutenant Stewart's revolver to the officer; he claimed to procure it through Jahuta, who held other stolen rifles. Vantura was made into a prisoner and brought into their encampment. His subjects followed him non-violently before being separated by threats of using bayonets. Vantura pleaded illness as the excuse for why Dokulha was absent. Three Karbari accompanied Vantura, who was sent to summon Dokulha. A karbari returned and claimed Dokulha was too ill to travel.

The road construction continued further and a location in Darbilhi's old settlement was found to have amenities for a British outpost. Fort Tregear was established as a result. The party further ventured onwards towards the village of Lalleya. Lalleya initially resisted their entry before inviting them in after a display of force. He surrendered the field glasses and aneroid of Lieutenant Stewart.

=== North Lushai Column ===
Lianphunga's reputation among the Lushai chiefs was described as obnoxious. Many of the Howlong chiefs who disliked Lianphunga's tyrannical disposition readily allied with the British and aided them in cutting down the jungle to help the troops march through.

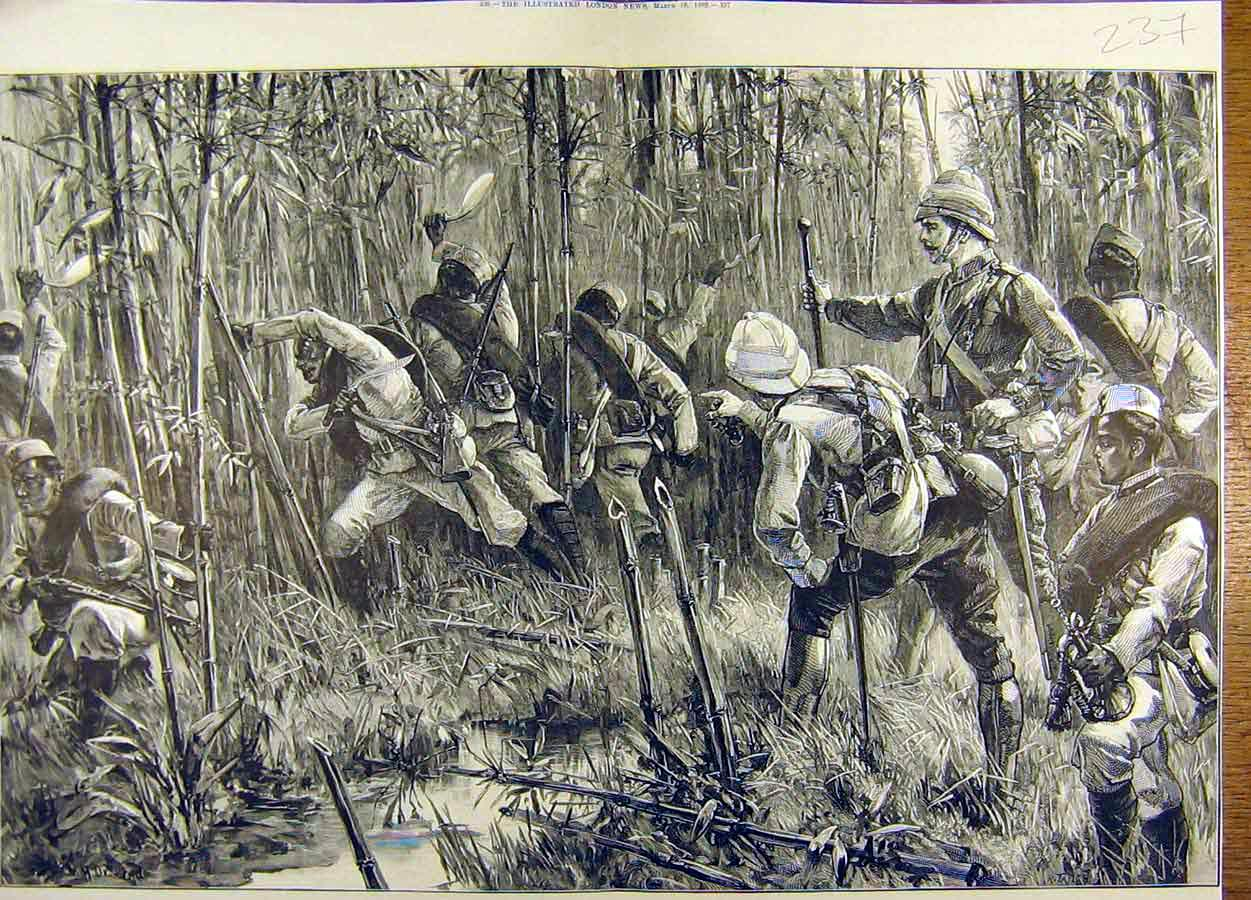
Lushai column clearing the path through the Lushai Hills.

The force used rivers to navigate the Luhshai Hills with rafts. Several boulders and fishing dams were removed from the path. During encampment, Murray interviewed four northern Howlong chiefs, Mompunga, Vantonga, Lalthuama and Lallura who brought presents of eggs, vegetables and zu (rice beer). Messages were sent to northern chiefs such as Lalhleya and Lalbura to aid in guiding the force, cutting the jungle and inform about Lianphunga's whereabouts.

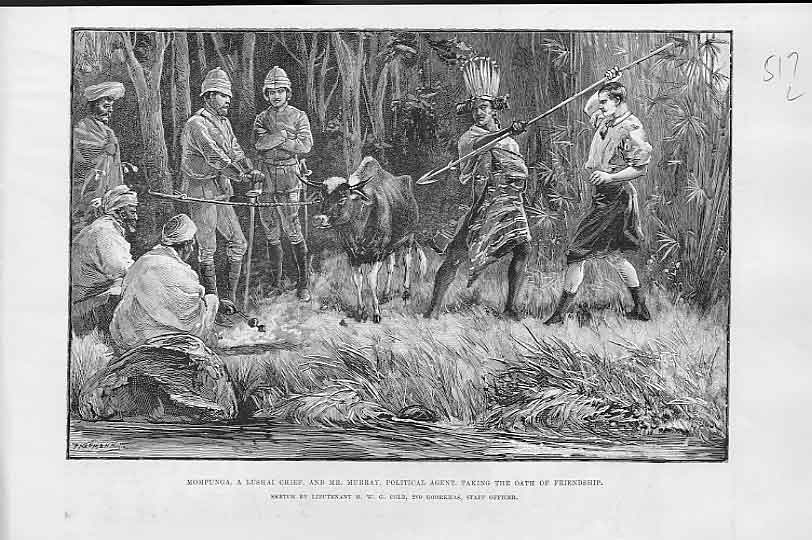
Mompunga, a Lushai chief, and Mr. Murray, Political Agent, taking the oath of friendship - ILN 1890

On 3 February 1890, Mompunga, a Howlong chief, met with Murray. The purpose of the visit was to seal a bond of friendship. Mompunga took an oath or thissa. Mompunga stated: "Until the sun ceases to shine in the heaven, and until yonder stream runs backwards, I will be your true and faithful friend."

During encampment four chiefs, Lalhleia, Lalburha, Lal Chema and Lalova, met with Murray. The chiefs informed of the direction and distance of Lianphunga's settlement from the current encampment. Colonel Skinner would arrive to Lianphunga's village on 8 February. Lianphunga would surrender to Skinner the following day. Lianphunga gave up many of his captives from the Chengri valley raid and sent them to Changsil. The rest of the force reached Lianphunga's old settlement not too far away from his newer one. The village was armed, but no violence was committed by the men who opted to flee instead. Lianphunga made contact with Daly's camp on 9 February. Daly did not consider himself justified in seizing Lianphunga and allowed him to return to his village as he had already cooperated with Skinner and released captives. Lianphunga would subsequently escape the following morning. Colonel Skinner would be staying nearby in a village. In the morning the Lushais burned down the village as the force escaped and tried to put out the fires. In the end, the supplies were lost in the huts and neighbouring villages supplied their grain from their jhums. In the North Lushai Hills, the remains of Thanruma's village was seen as a desirable location for a permanent post on which Fort Aizawl would be built.

Nikama the perpetrator of the raid on Pakuma Rani was close to Lianphunga's settlement. A prisoner released by the party before their arrival to Nikama's settlement, introduced the party to the upas. The upas stated that Lungliena had died and that Nikama had escaped with Lianphunga. The upas however freed the captives. The British fined the settlement 60 guns and Rs. 300 for Nikama's absence. A deadline of one day was given to procure the fine. As the village failed to do so, the settlement was burnt down. This repeated a second time for another village under Nikama. Kairûma who was also implicated in the raid was not punished due to the lack of time to visit his settlement. The chiefs furthermore assembled before the force. Kalkham, Lianphunga, Sailianpuia, Thanruma, Thanghulha, Mintang, Senkhomga and Tolera with a large following met with Mr Daly at his camp. They negotiated the surrender of Lianphunga but failed to reach an agreement. As a result, Lianphunga was not given up by his brothers and followers. The force let him go as a result. The establishment of Fort Aijal took over the responsibility of operations in annexing and pacifying the Lushai Tribes. The force burnt down the remaining houses of Lianphunga's settlement.

Lianphunga's associates were subsequently captured. Political officers were appointed in the North and South to manage the annexation process.

== Chin Campaign ==
Following the harbouring of a Burmese pretender after the annexation of Burma by the British, conflict began to brew. The pretender took refuge in the Chin Hills under the Taisun tribe. On 4–5 May 1888, hundreds of Taisun under the Burmese Prince Shwegyobyu captured the Sabwa of Kalay. The Sabwa of Kalay promised support to the rebellion to save himself and return to the capital in Kalay. The Chins and the Burmese held Chingaing as a result of 6 May. The British under Charles Crosswaithe sent a hundred rifles to Kalemyo under Major Gleig. Captain Eyre also moved up to support the flank from the Pakokku tract. The Kabaw Valley battalion also moved down. As a result, on 26 May, the British marched to Yaw country and recovered Chingaing held under Prince Shwegyobyo, who fled back into the Chin Hills. The British offered an ultimatum to the Taisuns to deliver Shwe Gyobyu and the other rebels. A similar ultimatum was also delivered to the Sizang tribe. Crosswaithe decided on two options which a punitive expedition or permanent occupation of the Chin Hills to propose a solution to the issue. Sir John Ware Edgar, Chief Secretary of Bengal, expressed his view to the Government of India that the inaccessibility of the country makes punitive measures difficult to enforce on the tribes and that opening up the unknown tract and making them recognise a single surrounding government would be an efficient policy via annexation.

On 17 September 1888, the Taisuns raided a village near Sihaung. The Zokhua, Haka and Thetta allied together in the south Chin Hills. The Baungshe tribes such as the Tawa, Kape, Shanpi, Sinsit, Aka and Lansit also attempted cooperation and alliances as a result. The Haka-Zokhua alliance made two raids in the Yaw country, killing eight and capturing 28. The Sizang under Chief Khai Kam attacked a party of Shans in Kalay, killing one and capturing four boys. The British, in response, raised a Chin Levy on the Chin Hills frontier for defence purposes and rushed Captain Raikes to Indin and Brigadier General Faunce to Kalay. The British established defensive outposts in the Kabaw Valley from Tamu to Gangaw, Minywa and Tilin on the Yaw border. The expedition against the Chin tribes was halted on account of the British conducting an expedition in Sikkim. In Burma, British forces were also occupied with the Kachin tribes. The Government of India thus prepared a blockade of the Chin Hills on the Burmese side. However, the raids continued into the Kalay valley. On 14 October 1888, Homalin was attacked by Shwegyobyu and the Taisuns. The Sizangs also attacked the village of Chitpauk near Yazagyo. On 20 October, Kambale was attacked. Kantha was attacked on 22 October and Kalemyo again on 29 October. The Kamhau tribe on the 29 also attacked Khampat killing seven and capturing 27. As a result, the Government of India sanctioned an expedition against the tribes on 16 November.

=== Sizang and Kam Hau Expedition ===
The newly sanctioned expedition operated with a goal to cripple the Sizang tribe. The Sizangs were located close to the plains of Kalay and had a reputation as a ferocious tribe hence being targeted first. The plan of operations was the construction of a road, fortify provisions and continue the process until the column had a steady way to attack the Sizangs in their homeland. The base of operations were established at Kambale. In December 1888, the first six miles of road was constructed and provisions were pushed forward via mule carts. The Sizang noticing the progress took action and ambushed the Madras Sapper Compoany on 7 December. The intensity of the ambush revealed to the British the Taisun and Sizang had allied together. Skirmishes continued and some attacks were made on the British in the plains but were driven back. On 30 December, General Sir George Stuart White arrived in Kambale and undertook the column to the hills. The Chins stockaded themselves and continued to ambush troops covering road makers. After a successful defense against the amush, General White advanced upon Khuasak with a large force accompanied by General Faunce and Major Raikes. The Chins in Khuasak were overwhelmed and burned their villages before retreating further west into the hills. The column then rested before destroying the villages of Buanman and Thuklai. The British column then advanced further where Fort White was built and named after General White.

The Kam Hau tribe which wished to avoid the fate of the Sizangs sent tributes to the British on 24 February 1889 requesting their villages to not be destroyed. Raikes offered to accept the request if the Kam Hau gave up their captives from the raids, surrendered half their guns, paid a ₹1,000 fine and an annual tribute afterwards. The Kam Hau, however, did not accept this proposal. As a result, General Faunce and Raikes advanced into the Sukte territory on 9 March 1889. The British encountered stiff resistance at Mualbem. On 13 March, General Faunce entered Tedim, where the Kam Hau chief Khaw Cin was residing. The Kam Hau burnt down the village after a fierce defence and abandoned the settlement. On 14 March, Phailian and Lamzang were also destroyed. On 16 March, the Kam Hau lost their Chief village of Za Tun and his brother Lian Tun's village of Bumzang. The British confiscated grain and other food supplies and returned them to Fort White. Following the activities of subduing the northern Chin, Raikes opened negotiations with the Taisun chief Boimon with little success. The Sizang and Sukte sent representatives to negotiate with the British. The Kam Hau acquiesced and paid the ₹1,000 fine and surrendered the captives on 2 May. Following an intense battle at Siallum under the Chief Lal Kam, the columns returned to Fort White to settle for the rainy weather. Charles Crosswaithe described the first expedition as failing to touch the Taisuns and failing to secure the submission of the Sizang and Kam Hau.

=== Chin-Lushai Expedition of 1888-1889 ===
Crosswaithe sent a proclamation to the Chin tribes, declaring that they would release their captives and refrain from any further raids on British territory. If the Taisun complied with the term their lives and property were to be spared and punishment for past offences would be withheld with the exception of surrendering Prince Shwegyobyu. The proclamation was sent to the Haka and Zokhua tribes as well.

On 3 September 1889 the Government of India approved the resumption of expeditionary activity in the Chin-Lushai hills. The Chin-Lushai Expedition would be a three pronged attack from Burma, Bengal and Assam. The objectives of the expedition were to punish tribes that had raided British territory and not come to terms, to subjugate neutral tribes into the British sphere of influence, and to explore the unknown territory of the Chin Lushai. The expedition was controlled under Sir William Penn Symons. Two columns were established, one at Buangshe in the south and another for the Northern Chins. Baungshe referred to the Chins south of the Taisun. This meant the Zokhua, Haka, Wunhla and Hanta clans. The Zohua and Haka were the most powerful, taking tribute from other tribes and thus were targeted by the British. On 18 December, General Symons advanced from Kan to Zokhua. The British set up posts on the road, urging surrender and white flags, but the Zokhua did not cooperate and fired on the column as they travelled. On 28 December at Taungtek, the British were attacked fiercely but repelled the attack.

From Taungtek, Symons advanced to Rawvan and encamped. Notices and posts were put up to urge surrender once more. The British encamped until the road to Zokhua was built. On 9 December, two small Chin villages surrendered, but Symons declined to make individual peace and preferred a broad Baungshe peace treaty. However, three Zokhua chiefs met with the column and tendered their submission. The terms were presented to release captives, not to raid and pay fines. In return, the British wouldn't change the administration of chieftainship, not annex the country, allow the keeping of guns, no damage to property, a fair price for labour and supplies and trading rights with British markets. The Zokhua accepted the offer and built quarters for the British at Zokhua. Haka also tendered submission and a fort was constructed. The country of the Thantlangs was reconnoitred.

In the Northern Chin Hills, the northern column left in November 1889 moved out of Fort White to Suangpi, where Sizang Chief Khup Pau took shelter along with the surrounding villages of Dimpi and Dimlo. The column continued to capture livestock and destroy crops as the Sizang put up strong resistance. Bertram S. Carey was established as the political officer at Fort White in the Chin Hills. Carey studied the effects of the destruction of villages on the Sizang and Kam Hai and changed policy. He restricted the destruction of villages to win over the chiefs and tribes, thereby inducing them into a state of cooperation. This was inspired by a possible alliance with the Sakhiling tribe, which controlled the route to the Taisun capital, thereby benefiting military operations. Carey improved the road to the Sakhiling settlement and built the Yawlu (Zolu) outpost with a garrison. The headmen eventually trusted the British, and the Sakhiling chief Mang Lun tendered his submission. Carey wished to use the Sakhiling chief's familial tie with the Suktes to pacify them. Mang Lun informed that the conduct of the Sizangs depended on the treatment of the Taisuns as they were following their lead. Hence, Carey restricted any destruction of Taisun villages.

The Northern and Southern Columns arrived and met at the Manipuri River close to Falam on 11 March. The Taisuns on 11 March met with the British and parleyed with them. The chiefs refused to pay the annual tribute demanded and could not confirm full payment of the fine of ₹1,000. Negotiations continued for two days and the Taisun chiefs tendered their submission to the British and agreed to all terms. An agreement was made to fight alongside the British to reduce the fines for chiefs who could not pay the fine. In April Syumons accompanied by the Haka chief visited villages to the South and was well received. He met General Tregear of the Chittagong Column at Haka on 15 April. The Sizangs who also promised to surrender alongside the Taisuns now did not deliver captives and continued cutting telegraph wires. Carey thus destroyed the villages of the Sizang such as Montok, Tanya and Pimpih. Pimpih fell to the British on 26 March. The Sizang chief and the Chief of the villages surrendered in the first two weeks of April and the Sizangs submitted by the end of April with all terms.

The Chin-Lushai Expedition was terminated officially in April 1890. General Symons submitted his report to the Chief Commissioner, stating that all Chin groups had been dealt with severely, but not all had fully submitted to British concerns. The promises of releasing captives and paying fines were yet to be fulfilled and honoured.

From the book – Frontier and Overseas Expeditions from India:

To the Northern column were assigned the duties of continuing and completing the subjugation and pacification of the Siyin, Sagyilaing, and Kanhow tribes of Chins, and of operating against the Tashons in conjunction with the Southern Column. The task of Brigadier-General Symons as Commander of the Southern Column was:

- First – To drive a mule road through the heart of the Baungshe Chin country to Yokwa and Haka, subjugating these tribes as he advanced; and obtaining the restoration of captives.
- Second – To advance in combination with the Northern column to the capital of the Tashon Chins and compel their submission.
- Third – To advance west from Haka, and, in co-operation with the Chittagong Column, complete the opening of the road between Bengal and Burma, coercing the tribes, and obtaining submission to our authority on both sides of the line of advance.
- Fourth – To visit villages; force the Chins to cease raiding and give up all captives; to explore the Chin Hills in every direction as far as the limits of time and the working season would permit.
- Fifth – To establish the necessary posts to hold the country after the withdrawal of the main body of the troops.

General Symons assumed command of the Burma Columns, Chin-Lushai Field Force on 15 November 1889, and about this time the preparations for the expedition were in the following state: The Southern Column had concentrated at Pakokku for its march of 165 miles to Kan. On account of the unusually late rains the start of the expedition had been put off until November 23. The Northern Column was ready at Fort White, and only awaited the arrival of its hill coolies. It had been decided to establish ten posts along the western portion of the Burma frontier for its protection against Chin raids. All the garrisons for these posts were sent up the Chindwin river to Kalewa. The late rains had flooded the Kale valley, and up to the end of November the country was impassable to anything but elephants. The energies of the officers, however, overcame all difficulties, and by the end of December these ten posts were constructed, occupied, and rationed.

The rationing of Kan, however, the head-quarters of the Southern Column, was one of the greatest difficulties with which the General had to contend. Kan was 165 miles by road from Pakkoku, the main base, and on 23 November, owing to the floods, carts could only travel sixty miles of this distance. A small river, the Myittha, connected Kan to Kalewa on the Chindwin, but it was very shallow and swift, full of rocks, and generally difficult of navigation. Owing to the difficulties of land transport, however, Lieutenant Holland, of the Indian Marine, explored the 136 miles of this river between Kan and Kalewa, and pronounced that it would be possible to send stores up by this route. This form of transport was accordingly adopted, and, under the supervision of Lieutenant Holland, was worked with conspicuous success until the end of January, when the river became too shallow for navigation. During February the transport officers had to meet a fresh difficulty in cattle-disease, which broke out with great virulence in the Kale and Myittha valleys, and through which the number of pack bullocks available was reduced by two-thirds. The first troops of the Southern Column reached Kan on 7 December, and the Sappers of the party began work on the road to Yokwa and Haka the next day.

Before the expedition started it was believed that the Southern Column would be able to reach Haka in at the most twelve days from Kan, and all calculations were made on this surmise. Such, however, were the unexpected difficulties of the country that, with the whole strength of the force devoted to making the road, sixty-four miles in length, it took the head of the column sixty-six days to get into Haka, while the mule road was not completed until the seventy-seventh day from commencing the work. This disappointing delay was not without its compensating advantages in dealing with the Chins. They expected us to make a quick advance, do some damage, and then retire. The steady persistent advance, together with the pains taken to get into touch with them, and to explain our objects and intentions, paralysed their efforts for resistance, and thus tribe after tribe submitted and yielded to our terms.

The Chins first met with by the Southern Column were the Yokwas of the Baungshe tribe. From the outset it was resolved to try a lenient policy with the Southern Chins, who before these operations had not come into contact with us. After one poor attempt by the Yokwas at opposition to our advance on 28 December, near Taungtek, when they acknowledged to having had 500 men and 300 guns against us, and to having sustained a great defeat, they gave up all hope of keeping us out of their hills. On 8 January two Yokwa Chins came into camp, and from this date onwards we were never again out of touch with the tribes. The objects of our coming, and our terms, were carefully explained to these two men, and they were dismissed to repeat them to their chiefs, who formally surrendered shortly after. The next day Lieutenant Foster and two other officers were strolling outside the camp when they were suddenly fired at by a few Thetta men in ambush, and Lieutenant Foster was shot dead. In consequence of this the nearest village, Lamtok, was burnt. Having dealt with the Yokwas, the column moved on Haka as soon as the mule path was sufficiently forward, arriving there on 13 February. The same procedure as that adopted with the Yokwas obtained the full submission of the important Haka community; and the surrender of these two tribes was virtually equivalent to the submission of the whole Baungshe country.

Having destroyed the enemy's villages and crops for many months, and captured a few stockades, the chiefs of the tribes believe surrender was necessary, and on 30 April 1890 the expedition was ended and disbanded.

== Aftermath ==
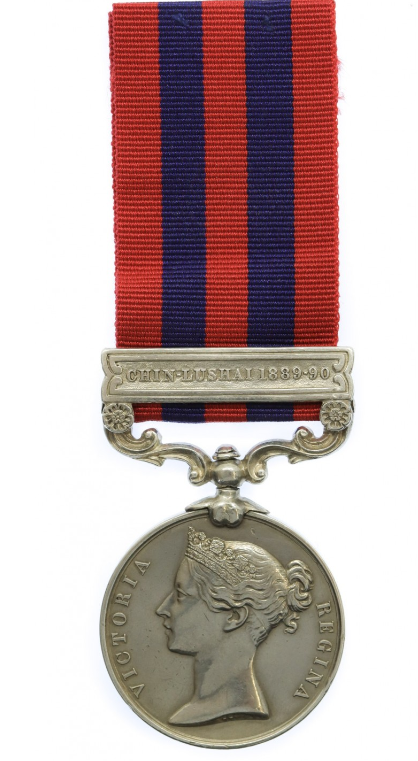
India General Service Medal with clasp for Chin-Lushai 1889–90

The British and Indian soldiers involved in the campaign were awarded the India General Service Medal with the clasp Chin Lushai 1889–90.

Col Symons, Col Tregear and Brigade Surgeon Edward Corrigan Markey were appointed Companions of the Order of the Bath (CB) for their service during the campaign, and the following were appointed Companions of the Distinguished Service Order:-

- Lieutenant-Colonel and Colonel Richard Westmacott, Bombay Staff Corps.
- Lieutenant-Colonel and Colonel George John Skinner, Bengal Staff Corps.
- Surgeon-Major William Heed Murphy, Indian Medical Service, Bengal.
- Captain Arthur George Frederic Browne, Bengal Staff Corps.
- Surgeon Frederick Arthur Rogers, Indian Medical Service, Bengal.
- Captain John Shakespear, the Prince of Wales's Leinster Regiment (Royal Canadians).
- Lieutenant Arthur Henry Morris, the Royal Irish Regiment.
- Lieutenant Edward James Lugard, Bengal Staff Corps.
- Gerald Edward Holland, First Grade Officer of Her Majesty's Indian Marine.

J.W.P. Peters served in the expedition as a Lieutenant on special service from the 7th Dragoon Guards.

== Sources ==
- "War Medals and Their History". Archives.org. S. Paul & Co., London.
- Chatterjee, Suhas (1985). British rule in Mizoram. New Delhi: Mittal Publications.
- Chatterjee, Subhas (1995). Mizo Chiefs and the Chiefdom. New Delhi: M D Publications PVT LTD. ISBN 81-85880-72-7.
- McCall, Anthony Gilchrist (1949). Lushai Chrysalis. London: Luzac.
- Pau, Pum Khan (2020). Indo-Burma Frontier and the Making of the Chin Hills. London: Routeledge. ISBN 9780429324703.
- Reid, A.S. (1893). Chin-Lushai Land: Including a description of the various expeditions into the Chin-Lushai Hills and the final annexation of the country. Calcutta: Thacker, Spink and Co.
- Reid, Robert (1942). The Lushai Hills: culled from History of the frontier areas bordering on Assam from 1883-1941. Calcutta: Firma KLM. p. 49.
- Sakhong, Lian H. (2003). In Search of Chin Identity: A study in Religion, Politics and Ethnic Identity in Burma (PDF). Denmark: NIAS Press. ISBN 87-91114-15-2.
- Shakespear, L.W (1929). History of the Assam Rifles. London: Macmillan and Co, Limited.
