= John Shakespear (British Army officer) =

British Officer (1861-1942)

Colonel John Shakespear CMG CIE DSO
- Tarmita
- Maj. J. Shakespear (Middle) with the editorial board of Mizo leh Vai Chanchinbu (c.1895)

Superintendent of the Lushai Hills (South)
- In office 16 April 1891 – 31 March 1896
- Monarch: Queen Victoria
- Governor General: Lord Lansdowne
- Preceded by: Charles Stewart Murray
- Succeeded by: Robert Henry Sneyd Hutchinson

Superintendent of the Lushai Hills (North)
- In office 1898–1899
- Preceded by: Alexander Porteus
- Succeeded by: Office abolished

Superintendent of the Lushai Hills
- In office 1898–1899
- Preceded by: Office Established
- Succeeded by: H.W.G. Cole

Superintendent of the Lushai Hills
- In office 1900–1903
- Preceded by: H.W.G. Cole
- Succeeded by: L.O. Clarke (acting)

Superintendent of the Lushai Hills
- In office 1903–1905
- Preceded by: L.O. Clarke
- Succeeded by: John Campbell Arbuthnott

Personal details
- Born: 1 September 1861 West Bengal, British Raj
- Died: 10 February 1942 (aged 80) Cheltenham, Gloucestershire, England
- Spouse(s): Charlotte Frances Beaufort Dunne (m. 1892; died 1926) Mary Catherine Grove (m. 1926)
- Parent(s): Sir Richmond Campbell Shakespear (Father); Marion Sophia "Lady Shakespear" Shakespear (b. Thompson, Mother)
- Education: Wellington College, Berkshire

Military service
- Allegiance: United Kingdom
- Branch/service: Army
- Rank: Colonel
- Unit: Prince of Wales's Leinster Regiment (Royal Canadians)
- Battles/wars: Chin-Lushai Expedition; Lushai Rising

Colonel John Shakespear CMG CIE DSO (Lushai: Tarmita,lit. 'Mr. Spectacles', 1 September 1861 – 10 February 1942) was the first Superintendent of the British Lushai Hills serving from 1891 to 1896. He also was an officer of the British Army in India, an Indian Political Service officer, and an author.

== Early life and education ==
John Shakespear was born in West Bengal on 1 September 1861. Shakespear belonged to Shakespear's Walk, known popularly as the Shadwell family of London. Shakespear was the youngest of the ten children of Sir Richmond Campbell Shakespear and Marian Sophia Thompson.

Shakespear was educated at Wellington College, Berkshire and the Royal Military College, Sandhurst. Shakespear enlisted himself in 1881 at twenty years old after completing his military education.

== Career ==
Upon enlistment, Shakespear was commissioned into the Prince of Wales's Leinster Regiment (Royal Canadians) on 22 July 1881 as a 2nd lieutenant and was promoted to lieutenant on 1 July 1881.

John Shakespear originally arrived at the Lushai Hills in 1888 to accompany Lieutenant Baird in surveying the frontier in the south. Captain Shakespear was tasked with reconnaissance of the survey party under Baird's party while Lieutenant J.F Stewart commanded the second survey party. Lieutenant Stewart's party began at Rangamatti on January 16 and worked towards Saichal where Shakespear and Baid's party would meet working from Demagiri.

He was an intelligence officer for the Lushai Expeditionary Force in 1888. He served with the Chin-Lushai Expedition of 1889-90 and was awarded the DSO in 1890. He served at Lushai in 1892 and was in command of the force that took part in the operations in the South Lushai Hills. He was promoted to major in 1895 and was appointed CIE in 1896. He served from 1891 to 1896 as Superintendent of the South Lushai Hills. He was appointed Assistant Commissioner, Assam in 1896 and Deputy Commissioner, Assam in 1897. He served as Political Agent in Manipur from 1905 to 1917. He was appointed CMG in 1917.

== Family ==
Shakespear married Charlotte Frances Beufort Dunne in 1892. His first wife died in 1926 and he married Mary Catherine Grove. He was keenly interested in the custody of his father's papers and in the history of the Shakespear family. John Shakespear left notes on the state of Manipur and its royal family and some draft chapters of his autobiography.

== Death ==
Shakespear died on 10 February 1942.

== Selected publications ==
- The Lushais and the Land they Live in. 1894.
- The Lushei Kuki Clans. Macmillan. 1912.
- The Thirty-fourth Division, 1915–1918. H. F. & G. Witherby. 1921.

== Sources ==
- Innes, Christopher. "Colonel John Shakespear". MyHeritage.
- Rao, Hayavadana (1915). The Indian Biographical Dictionary. Madras: Pillar.
- Lalzuimawia, K. (2016). John Shakespear in the Lushai Hills (1888-1905) (PDF). History and Ethnography. Mizoram University Aizawl (History thesis). Aizawl.
- "Lieut-Col. J. Shakespear". The Times. No. 49159. 13 February 1942.
- "Death of Lt.Col. J. Shakespear". Cheltenham Chronicles. 14 February 1942.
