= Economic census =

The term economic census may refer to various censuses of economic activity. These include:

- Censo Económico (Mexico)
- Indian economic census
- United States Economic Census
