= British rule in the Lushai Hills =

Period in the history of Mizoram from 1889 to 1947

South Lushai Hills (1889–1898) North Lushai Hills (1891–1898) Lushai Hills (1898–1947) Mizoram
- Part of Bengal Presidency (1889–1898); Integrated with Assam (1889–1912); District of Assam Province (1912–1947)
- 1889–1947
- Flag Coat of arms of the United Kingdom

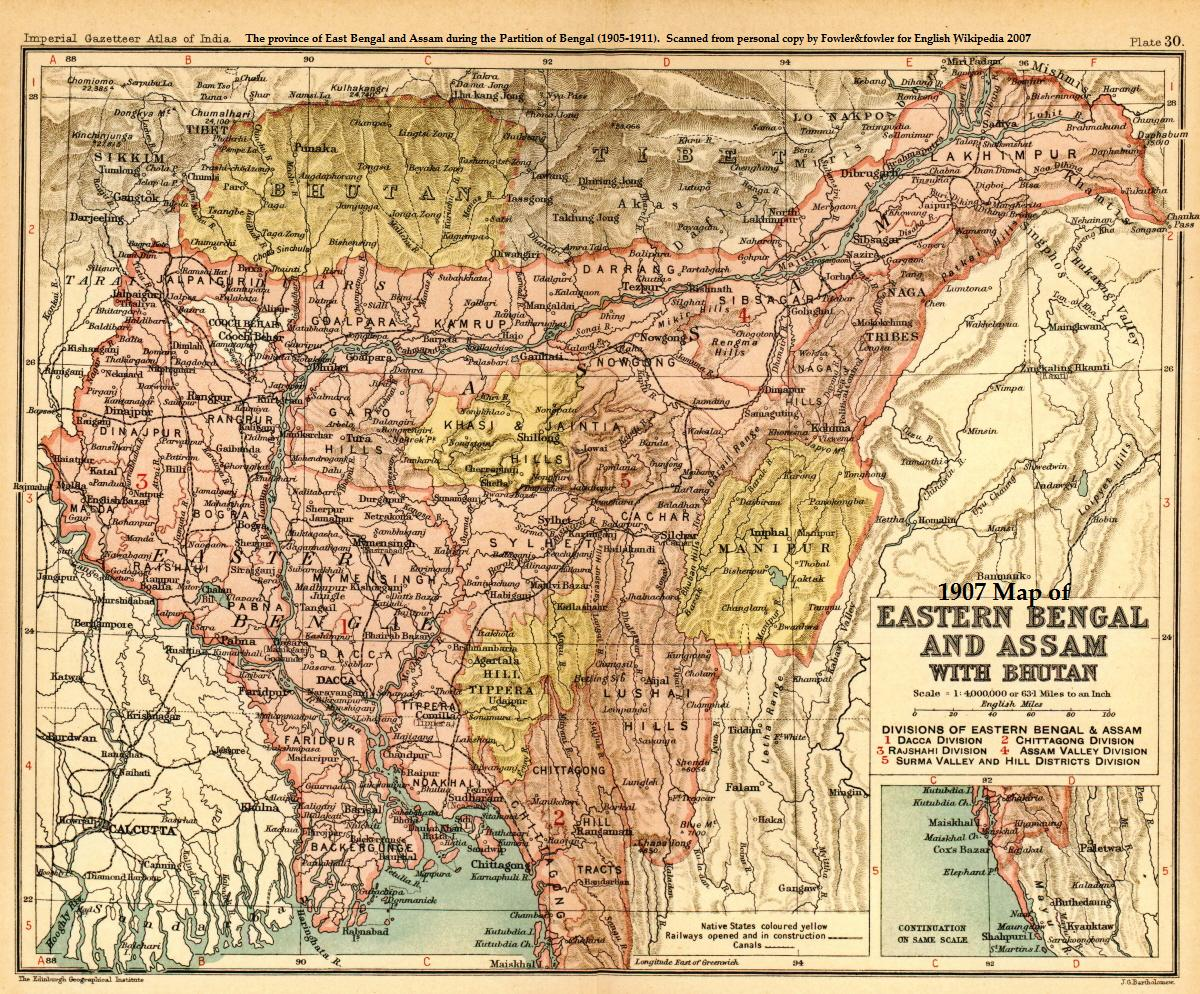
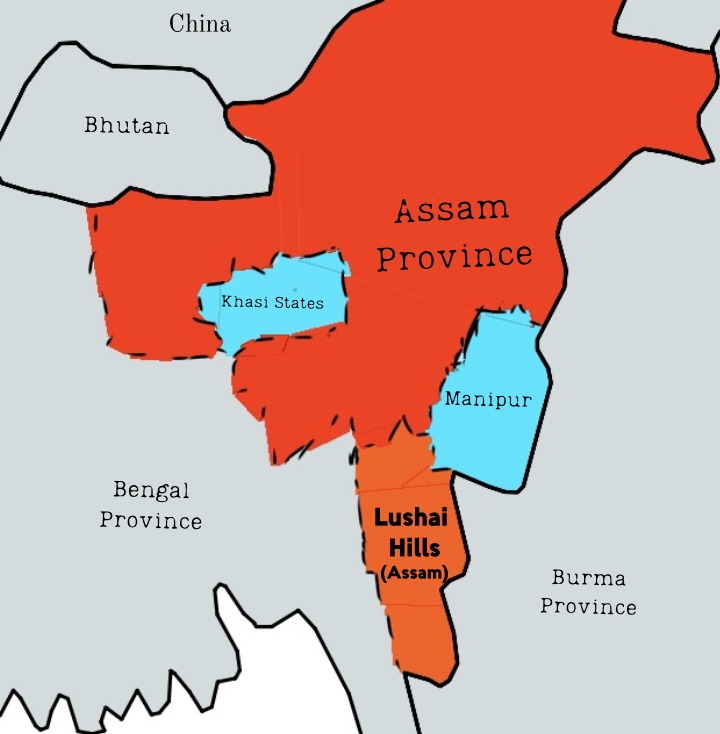
- Capital: Lungleh (1889–1898) (Note: Lungleh was the capital only for the South Lushai Hills.); Aijal (1889–1947)
- Demonym: British; Indian; Lushai
- Population
  - 1901: 82,434
  - 1941: 152,786
- Government
- Monarch
  - 1889–1901: Victoria
  - 1901–1910: Edward VII
  - 1910–1936: George V
  - 1936: Edward VIII
  - 1936–1947: George VI
- Superintendent
  - 1891–1896 (first): John Shakespear
  - 1943–1947 (last): Alexander Ranald Hume MacDonald
- Historical era: Colonial era
  - Expedition 1889: 4 March 1889
  - Lushai Expeditions: 1871–1872, 1883–1888
  - Divided into North Lushai Hills and South Lushai Hills: 1889
  - North given to Assam: July 3, 1890
  - South placed under Bengal Presidency: April 1, 1891
  - North and South merged: April 1, 1898
  - Independence declared: 15 August 1947
Preceded by	Succeeded by
Lushai Chiefdoms	Lushai Hills District
- Today part of: Mizoram

British rule in the Lushai Hills, spanning from the late 1889 to the 1947, commenced with the Chin-Lushai Expedition of 1889–90 leading to the formal establishment of the two administrative districts (North Lushai Hills, South Lushai Hills) in 1889 and continued through the integration of the regions into the province of Assam with both districts being merged as the Lushai Hills until India gained independence in 1947.

After the Chin–Lushai Expedition of 1889–90, South Lushai Hills was occupied in 1889, and the following year, it was formally annexed, becoming part of Bengal Presidency. North Lushai Hills was also occupied in 1889 and became part of British Assam. In 1889, the two districts merged and continued to be part of British Assam. In 1912, it was put into British India's Assam Province.

== Etymology ==
The Lushai hills are named after the Lushei clan. The name of the tribes became a colonial misnomer which applied to all of the Mizo tribes. The earliest recorded documentation was in 1862 which described Lhooshai Kukis living on the border of Cachar. The spelling of Lushai became standardized with the Progressive Colloq. Exercises in Lushai Dial. 3 by Thomas Herbert Lewin. Lewin claimed that Lu denotes head and sha or shat denotes cutting, which would imply the tribe is named as decapitators, a title supportive of the fact that the tribes had a reputation for headhunting. This view was rebuked by John Shakespeare who argued the name Lushai to be an eponym of a chief or ancestor of the Lushai clans. It is also argued that the name is a purely Lushai language word, that Lu means head and shei means long, as a reference to how the hair knot makes the head appear elongated. Theories have also proposed that the name is Burmese derived and means people ten. The name Lushai continued as the name of the district past Indian independence before becoming changed into the Mizo District with the political efforts of the Mizo Union in the Lushai Hills District (Change of Name) Act, 1954.

== British discovery of the Lushai Hills ==
The Lushai people and the British colonial area started to engage in war in September 1826. About ten miles south of Tlawng river, traveled a Mizo village leader named Buangtheuva (known to the British as "Bungteya") and his troops, who then invaded the Sylhet forest's timber. In addition to taking some slaves home, they slaughtered an unknown number of people. Thus, the British came to perceive the Lushais (then known as Looshais) as a vicious and barbaric tribe as a result of this event.

== Background ==
After the annexation of Cachar in 1832, the British became close in proximity to several Lushai tribes and clans. Reports of the time show a friendly relationship between Lushai and Cacharis, who pursued trade and other exchanges. However, the individual choices of select chiefs, such as Lalsuthlaha, to raid villages deteriorated relations. It was thought that the British invaded the Lushai Hills not because of any commercial desire but due to a series of Mizo invasions to the plains.

The Lushai chiefs relentlessly and viciously invaded Chittagong, Cachar, Tripura, Sylhet, and Manipur between the end of 1870 and the beginning of 1871. Up to 20 invasions were said to have occurred during this time.

The raid of Katlichhera and Alexandrapur by Sailam chief Bengkhuaia appeared to be the most important of all Lushai chief invasions, having a tremendous influence on the lives and future of the Lushai people. James Winchester, the tea owner of Alexandrapur, was killed, and the Mizos kidnapped his daughter Mary Winchester (Mizo: Zolûti). The British retaliated by organising an expedition to rescue the hostages. The expedition turned out a success and the hill tribes agreed to negotiate peace terms. The peace lasted until 1888, when tribes resumed raiding British enterprises and settlements, which saw the Chin-Lushai Expedition establish the territories under British sovereignty.

== History ==
The outcome of the Chin-Lushai Expedition saw the region subdivided into two sections. The North Lushai hills were administered by a political officer stationed at Fort Aijal under the Assam Government. The South Lushai Hills were under the administration of a political officer stationed at Fort Treager. This political officer reported to the commissioner of Chittagong who was under the Bengal Government.

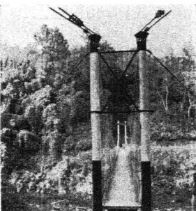
A public works bridge in Tuirial.

=== Lushai Rising ===
Paramilitary units were established to pacify the recently conquered tribes effectively in unfamiliar terrain. The North Lushai battalion was founded for this reason, and by 1898, the strength of civil and military police in North and South Lushai came to about 1106 personnel. The British also began to invest into local infrastructure to improve the army and police's ability to curb insurgency and raiding. Roads between Sairang-Silchar were constructed and another connecting Aijal to Serchhip. Bridges across rivers were also constructed to improve mobility during monsoons and rainy reasons. The total expenditure for public works amounted to Rs 80,000.

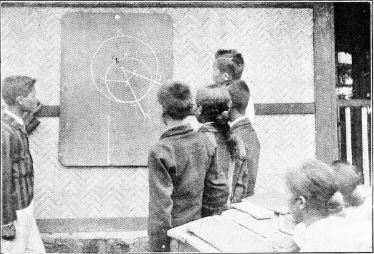
Lushai mission school students learning arithmetic.

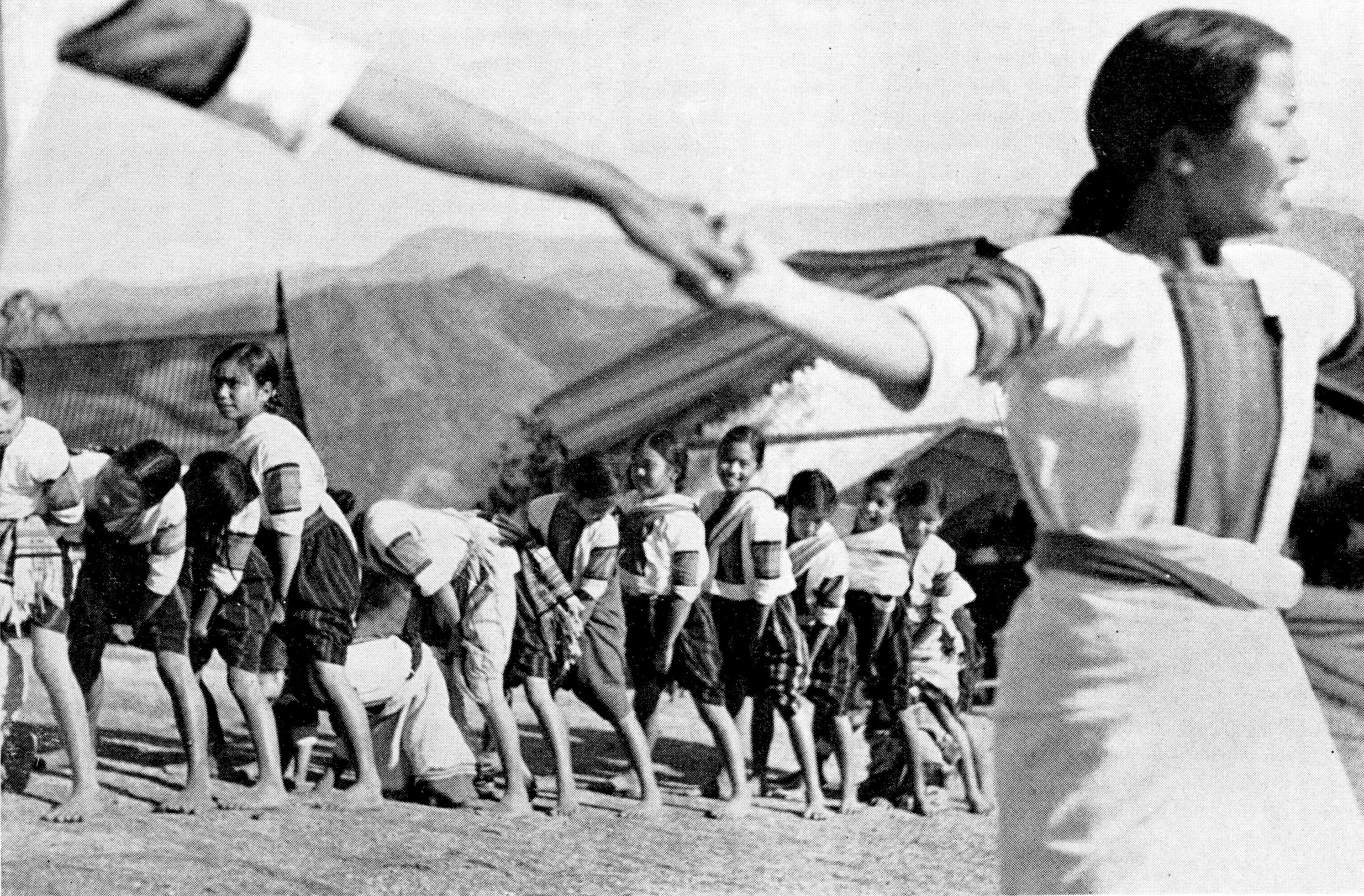
Lushai schoolgirls playing Sapu Ui Lut.

=== Early Institutions ===
The British administration set up schools imparting literacy to both sepoys and young individuals of both genders from the Lushai tribes. By 1900, there were three government schools and one mission school. These schools operated with the Lushai language and taught arithmetic, Hindi and English. 45 villages out of 93 in Aizawl had the light of literacy with British support. Initial intentions for education was to instruct in Bengali but this proposal was deflected by Welsh missionaries who saw the parallels of Bengali imposition in Lushai Hills to English imposition in Wales.

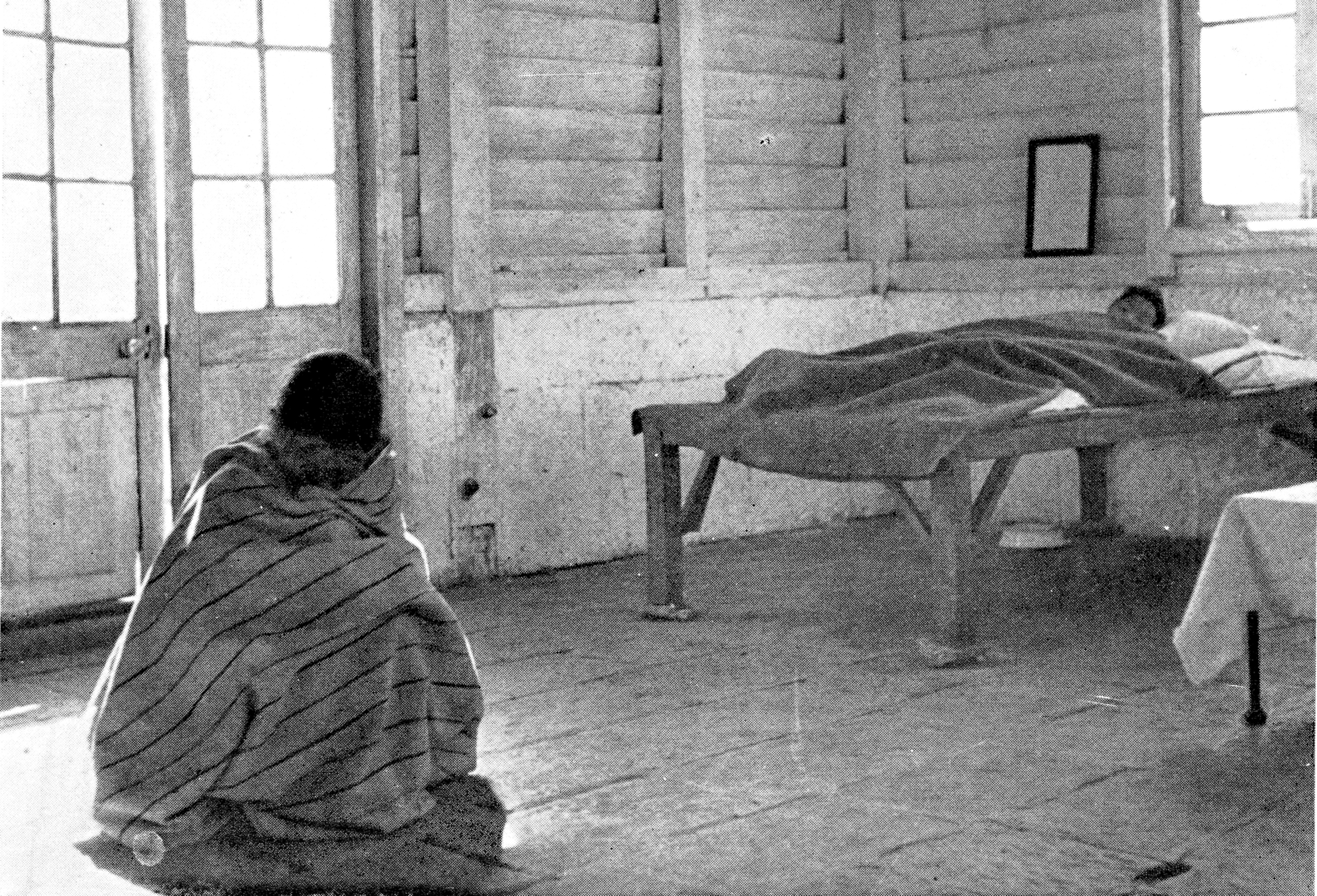
An early Lushai dispensary.

Medical infrastructure was also established to maintain the health of soldiers. This service extended to the civilian population with free medical provisions that affected the image of the Raj in the tribes. In 1896, the British constructed a big hospital in Aizawl and medicines were distributed freely to the chiefs. The conduct of the British in the Lushai hills functioned parallel to a welfare state.[18]

=== Chin-Lushai Conference ===
The beginnings of British rule over the Lushai Hills had proposals of amalgamating the Chin-Lushai tribes into a single administrative unit rather than maintaining a division between Chin Hills and (North and South) Lushai Hills. The conference was held at Fort Williams, Calcutta on the 25–29 January 1892. It was under the presidency of Charles Alfred Elliott who was the governor of Bengal. Five resolutions were adopted as a result of the conference. The first resolution stated a majority opinion supported the idea of a single administrative unit of the Chin Hills and Lushai Hills preferably under the Chief Commissioner of Assam. The second resolution delayed the urgency of the creation of a single Chin-Lushai District on the opposition of the Chief Commissioner of Burma Alexander Mackenzie, stating it should not be taken immediately.

The recommendation ultimately reached the Viceroy Landsdowne. While Landsdowne favoured the recommendation, the council was evenly split. The opposition of the former Chief Commissioner of Burma Charles Crosthwaite with knowledge of the Chin-Lushai tracts worded a strong argument against the district's creation. A decision was made on 2 August 1892 in a telegraph to the Chief Commissioner of Rangoon, stating that the Chin Hills would remain under Burma. The legacy of this decision was finalized in the 1937 split of Burma and India under the Government of India Act 1935, which established an international boundary between the two countries, splitting the Chin-Lushai tribes.

=== Construction of Aizawl ===
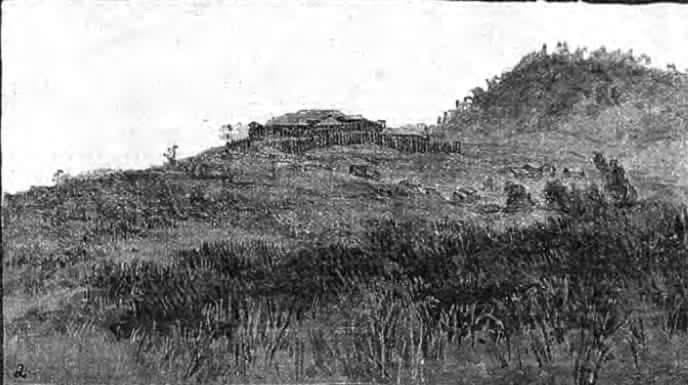
Fort Aijal, present-day Aizawl, in 1889.

Fort Aijal was founded in 1890 on an abandoned village site. It functioned as a barracks for two columns of the forces from the Chin Lushai Expeidition with fortifications improvised from locally harvested teak trees. The Fort grew with the relocation of the Silchar Police Battalion. Local resources such as quarried stone led to installing of bungalows and barracks. Commandant of the Military Police, Captain Granville Henry Loch, with a Khasi contractor, expanded the settlement. Loch was a soldier but possessed experience as an engineer. Loch trained his own men in quarrying and shaping stone. He used sepoys in greater numbers and instructed them in masonry, carpentry and roadmaking. This initiative lent his battalion a reputation as a pioneer instead of an ordinary infantry unit. Within the span of a few years, Loch had removed the improvised structures and abandoned village remnants into a station of well-constructed stone houses with corrugated iron roofs, proper doors and windows.

=== Christianity ===
On 11 January 1894, the first missionaries entered the Lushai Hills, known as James H. Lorrain and Frederick W. Savidge. It took both missionaries five years to baptise their first two converts. The meagre gain from their efforts convinced Robert Arthington, the patron of the Arthington Aborigines Mission, to move to the next hill tribe. Before the departure of Lorrain and Savidge, D. E Jones, a missionary under the Welsh Calvinistic Methodist mission, joined them. Jones struggled with obtaining results from his efforts, and many of his converts would be expelled shortly after being received into communion. His later converts would also leave on their own volition in 1904–1905. In seven years, the 1901 census recorded 45 Christians amid a population of 82,000, and only five were baptized church members.

=== Mizo alphabet ===
James Herbert Lorrain and Frederick William Savidge discovered that the Mizos possessed an oral language with no written system. They spent four years learning the Mizo language. In 1898, they reduced the Mizo language to writing and introduced the grammar of the language. To introduce a writing system, the two missionaries established a Mizo alphabet via simple Roman script using diacritical marks in some of the letters. The alphabets were: a, â, âw, aw, b, ch, d, e, ê, f, g, h, i, î, k, l, m, n, o, p, r, s, t, ṭ, u, û, v, z.

At first, the letter "aw" was used for long-sounding vowels while "o" represented short sounds. However, Reverend D.E. H Jones and E. Rowlands found it inappropriate. In 1903, a conference was held between the missionaries at the Welsh mission on the Mizo literary issue. The "aw" and "o" letters were allowed to be separated.

=== Merging of the Hills ===
A conference was held from 14 to 18 December 1896 with the superintendents of the North and South Lushai Hills to discuss administrative issues. It was decided that the merger of South Lushai Hills to Assam would provide a saving of 2 lakhs. The government of Assam forwarded numerous proposals, including the recommendation for Aizawl to become the headquarters of the district and for Shakespear to be appointed the superintendent of the new district. Due to the increased territorial administration, Shakespear was to be assisted with political assistants. Three assistant superintendents were permanently transferred to the Assam government for the administration of the future district. The south Lushai Hills would be proposed to be formally transferred from 1 October 1897 into the northern district.

The North Lushai Hills and the South Lushai Hills were merged on 1 April 1898 by the Government of India. The Northern administration absorbed the South Lushai Hills, and its South Lushai Battalion was amalgamated on 13 April 1989 and renamed the Lushai Hills Military Police Battalion. The merger also saw the political headquarters of the South Lushai Hills, Fort Treagor, decommissioned due to water scarcity. Lieutenant Colonial John Shakespear functioned as the first superintendent of the Lushai Hills district. By 1900, several forts were decommissioned, and military police unit numbers were reduced with a reduction of resistance among the tribes. This achievement was partly attributed to the efforts of missionaries.

=== Circle system ===
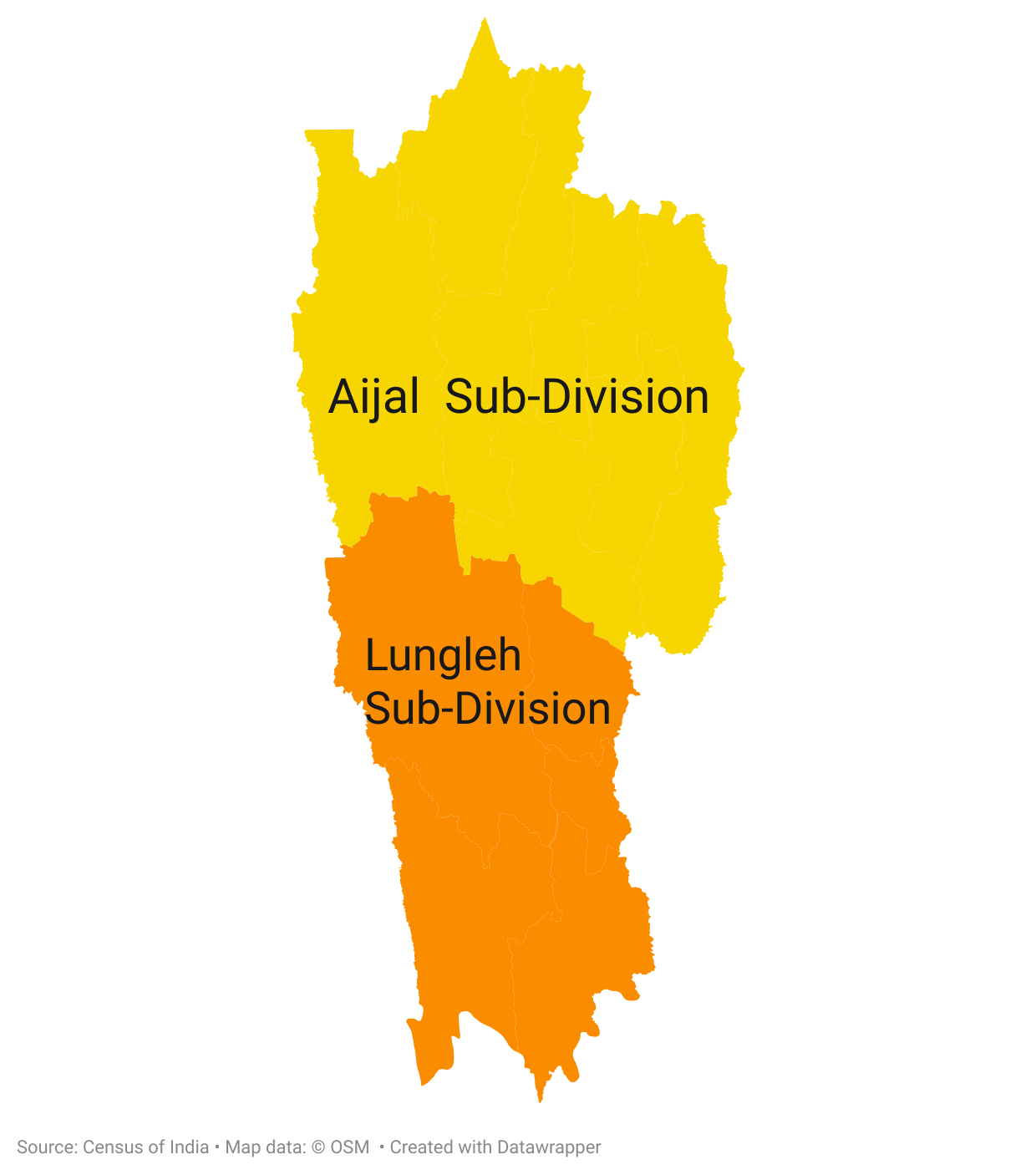
Subdivisions of Mizoram from 1898-1960s

The Lushai Hills district was originally divided into two subdivisions, North and South. In 1901–1902, the circle system was introduced to the Lushai Hills. The circle districts would comprise several villages. There were 18 circle districts established, 12 in Aizawl subdivision and 6 in the Lungleh subdivision. Each circle consisted of an interpreter placed in charge who would tour and be emissaries between the British and the chiefs. In 1908 the policy was changed so that circle interpreters were made to stay in Aizawl as to curb their influence of individual agendas concerning the chiefs. In the society of Mizo chiefdoms, the British introduced the Khawchhiar, a village writer. The khawchhiar would maintain statistics and other reports on the settlements and villages. The British considered the chiefs to be representatives of the concerns of their subjects and hence did not interact with commoners but only heard their concerns via their chiefs. Around the same time, 23 chiefs were further taken to Sylhet to meet with the Viceroy, George Curzon.

=== Boundary developments ===
In 1900, the boundary demarcating Manipur and the Lushai Hills was reconsidered with a boundary commission led by P. Maxwell and A.W. Cole. The commission engaged in field work and surveying from 22 January to 9 February 1900. Maxwell demarcated the boundary by stating that it begins at the junction of the Tuivai and Barak and continues to follow the Tuivai around several prominent landmarks. The government approved Maxwell's boundary line which remained unchanged even under Indian rule.

In 1901, the Chin-Lushai boundary was considered following the completion of the Manipur-Lushai border. A boundary commission was established which demarcated the Tupui and Tuaisai stream following the latter into the Tuimang and Bopuilui until the source of the Tyao river.

In 1903, Chief Commissioner Bampfylde Fuller declared the 1875 boundary was vague and insufficient in demarcation. This was observed as Lushai tribes began to migrate north and Cacharis moved south, leading to disputes over the territory and land of the two districts. Commissioner Fuller advocated for a revision and scientific demarcation via a transfer from the Cachar district to the Lushai Hills which contained Lushai villages. The tract in dispute was a resort for Lushai communities who disliked their chiefs and escaped beyond the control of the superintendent of the Lushai Hills. Fuller commissioned the boundary to cover running north from Chatter Chura down the Bhagsurra stream to the junction of the tlawng river and another boundary running south from the east side of the range into a stream that joined into the tlawng river. This boundary would trade both Cachar and Lushai land. The Governor General in council approved the transfer in 1904.

=== Mautam Famine ===
The mautam famine struck the Lushai Hills in 1911, which was approximately 30 years after the previous mautam famine in 1882. The harvests of 1909-1910 were exceptional due to well-distributed rainfall and benefitted Aizawl the most. However, in 1911, the Bamboo flowered, and rats began to proliferate in population as early as March. By June 1912, crops such as maize and millet were destroyed by rats shortly before ripening. The lack of infrastructure, such as a railway to transport rice aid, and the lack of markets in the Lushai Hills meant access to rice would take a journey of a few days, provided one could afford to do so.

The British government in the Lushai Hills employed two policies to combat the onset of the Mautam famine. The first policy aimed at reducing the invasive rat population by announcing incentives for killing rats. Up to 179,015 rat tails were produced for the government as a result. The second policy was to distribute food relief. This was decided as the Lushai Hills lacked any local markets to purchase rice from. The government allocated 585,000 rupees and ordered rice from independent merchants and shopkeepers to transport them from Sairang to Aizawl and Demagiri to Lunglei.

Food grains were issued to the needy on the condition of repayment with interest. This was difficult due to the lack of monetization of the economy at the time. To deal with this phenomenon, the British resorted to forced labour. Labourers were pooled from several villages to work on expanding Aizawl as a city by building roads, bungalows, offices and water storage tanks to combat water scarcity. Even if an individual had not taken a loan personally for food relief, they would become obligated to participate in forced labour to pay off another's debt. In retaliation, some villages and chiefs moved out of the Lushai Hills. Dokhuma Sailo moved his village to Tripura, and Hrangvunga Sailo also moved 200 families under him out of the territory to Tripura.

Famine relief also saw missionaries and the early church volunteering to distribute aid and food relief from stockade depots. Missionaries would also help sign loan papers as guarantors so individuals could receive the rice aid. The fallout of the famine saw the church take on the role of medical relief for the cholera outbreaks, taking in orphans and the destitute. The operations were funded by the Lushai Famine Funds mission directors and other donors. The efforts of the missionaries also saw the growth of Christianity. In 1912, up to 80 villages had churches and 1,800 converts in total.

=== World War One ===
The outbreak of World War One saw few Mizo men take the initiative to enlist, with numbers of enlistment increasing with the despisement of those who would not volunteer by courtships and belles of the villages. In April 1917, 2100 Lushai Men marched out in the 27th Indian Labour Corps under four companies. Initially many elderly men and women strongly opposed allowing their children to be sent to the war front. They suspected that the British would put them in the line of fire under the pretext of working as auxiliaries. The British announced the exemption of all volunteers to the impressed labour coolie quota to avoid unpaid labour. Some Chiefs sent forward villagers who were considered less worthy. Other entitlements such as a lifetime exemption from an annual housing tax, coolie labour quotas and an ability to tour abroad also proved popular for Lushai manpower. Missionary and government publications also propagandized the opportunity to fight abroad. Further recruitment initiatives were halted due to the Kuki Uprising in the bordering regions against continued recruitment. The Royal chiefs helped in gathering volunteers. Dohleia the son of Chief Khamliana made a rigorous campaign and volunteered to go to France as an example.

A dozen Mizos joined the St John Ambulance Corps and the Army Bearer Corps. Lorrain noted that wil many volunteers showed interest, the height restriction for enlistment filtered out many volunteers for qualification. A Labour Battalion of 2100 men volunteered and assembled at the Assam Rifle's Ground at Aizawl on 25 April 1917. Since the Mizo people never saw such a large gathering, they assumed they would inflict heavy casualties on the Germans. The Mizos marched to Silchar and boarded the train to Calcutta, and experienced tunnels and iron bridges. They took another train from Calcutta to Bombay. From Bombay, they voyaged on the Red Sea and reached France in June 1917.

The Corps was deployed in Marseille as La Valentine camp. The camp was built up with a canteen and a cinema over time. Labour Corps were also often accompanied by missionaries, for the Lushai Labour Corps, Reverend James Herbert Lorrain accompanied them. The Mios main responsibilities were to dismantle deserted trenches and dugouts and send wooden planks to reuse in new battlegrounds. Superintendent W.L. Scott comments that the Mizos accustomed fast to the climate and would finish their job faster than others. being close to the firing line, the Mizo camp was shelled and sometimes bombed but the Mizos were described as "steady and never alarmed".

The Mizos went through a cold icy winter but continued to provide great results of their labour. Lorrain reported that during the Hundred Days Offensive in March 1918, the Mizos worked so well under fire they earned special commendation for withdrawing from the danger zone without any casualties. The Church in Wales regularly sent parcels and gifts to the Mizos. D.E. Jones sailed with the Lushai labour corps as chaplain and translator and given the rank of honorary captain. Lorrain, at the behest of the YMCA, worked in France for four months.

Superintendent H.A.C. Colquhoun published in the Mizo leh Vai journal to help the British government by buying war bonds or depositing postal savings. Chief Khamliana contributed ₹1,000 towards the war effort.

The contracts to the Labour Corps personnel were made under one-year contracts, which timed out before the end of the war. Attempts to extend the term of contractual obligations were unsuccessful and led to many returning home. The Mizos were given a chance to visit London but everyone except one declined in order to come back home. Coming home, the Mizos received an elaborate reception at Chanmari, Aizawl, with the honour of a military band.

In the end, 2029 men of the original 2,100 returned. Deaths were attributed to the novelty of a sea journey to mainland Europe, disease, casualties from bombings and grenades in the course of labour work and ammunition handling. Lushai Labour Corps personnel were also active in Arras for demolition work, even deployed to regions such as Mesopotamia, Greece, Lucknow and the Ottoman vilayet of Basra.

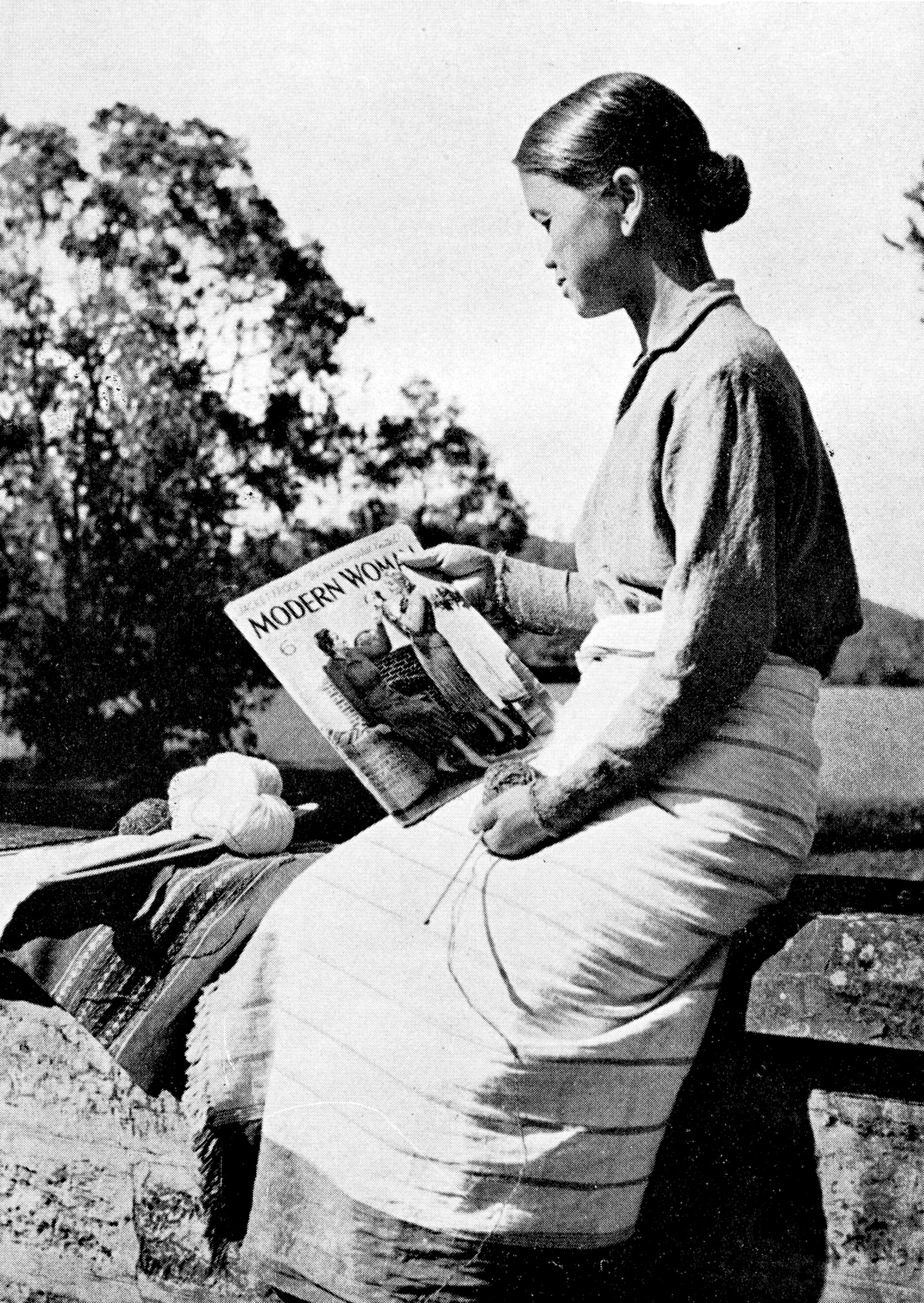
Lushai woman reading a magazine.

Returning from the war encouraged veterans to join the Assam Rifles, Assam Regiment and Indian Army Hospital Corps. In Aizawl, a memorial was constructed shortly after the war to commemorate the deaths of 71 Labour Corps volunteers. Exposure to foreign cultures in the course of the war redeployments also began to bring home new ideas of westernization and modernization. Some of these developments were the introduction of short hair and European dress. Articles such as those by Lalsailova in Mizo leh Vai suggested that rural readers consider moving to Aijal for the purpose of progress (hmasawnna). Mizo labourers also brought back crop seeds such as mustard, which changed traditional Mizo cuisine to French fusion in the post-war era. Men who normally kept their hair long in a bun at the back and front now began to keep short hair as 80% got the haircut during service. Some Mizos pushed back with satire for the haircutters. The exposure also encouraged new generation of students and young girls to pursue education.

=== First political movements ===
The first forms of organized politics in the Lushai Hills began in 1925 under the leadership of the Telela (Darchhingpuia), a pharmacist of the Ralte tribe in Kulikawn suburb of Aizawl. Telela formed a group with his friends Thuama, Saikunga and Thanzuala who were shopkeepers. Chawngbuia a church elder was also included along with two tailors, C.Z. Biaka and Chawngdailova. The group sent a memorandum to Parry protesting against compulsory labour such as construction of the chief's house, zawlbuk, village schools and coolie work. Parry was furious at the prospect. He threatened the group with imprisonment if they did not desist. The group persisted and requested the Governor for the concessions of forced labour and for representation in the reformed provincial council. Telela was a romantic poet who continued to creatively express his ideals of freedom and the Christian millennium. Chawngbawia another prominent group member was a school teacher and church elder who believed in state participation like the Khasis. Rev. J.J.M. Nichola Roy, a khasi leader met with Telela and Chawngbawia in Shillong to discuss the lack of political representation. Nichols Roy stated that no political representation can be granted to the Lushai until they leave the excluded zone. He went on the advise steps in mobilising public support for administrative change and representation. The group under Telela began to deliver lectures at Aizawl upon their return. On account fo this and the governor's redirection of the memorandum to the superintendent, Parry issued an arrest for the group and placed them in Aizawl police station. They were released the next day but this had stifled political movements until post world war two.

=== Nevill Edward Parry ===
Nevill Edward Parry was superintendent of the Lushai Hills from 1924 to 1928. In 1926, the villagers of Chhinchhip complained to Parry about the oppression of their chief Hmingliana and the khawchhiar (village writer) Hrangchhuma. They requested for the dismissal of the two individuals. However Parry punished the complaints by fining every family ₹3 while a fine was imposed on Hmingliana of a mithun. Similarly a complaint by villagers in Reiek and Tuahzawl had lodged complaints against their chiefs in connection with village inscriptions which was sought to be pocketed by the chiefs.

Parry functioned on a basis of empowering the chiefs and the institution of chieftainship. Parry attempt to bring back the institution of the zawlbuk. The Zawlbuk was in its decline and not used with the onset of Christianity and modernization. Zorema argues that the institutions was a symbol of traditionalism and autocratic rule by chiefs. The Christian parents preferred to keep their sons home on account of the conditions being better for education. Parry would order that all villages larger 25 houses should maintain a zawlbuk. Parry also stopped the tradition of subdividing the land of the chiefs to disempower more chiefs and restrain the influence of petty headsmen. Complaints had also risen on the conduct of circle interpreters who demanded eggs, fowls, and goats through the chiefs who would tax the subjects. Parry put an end to this by requiring the circle interpreters to pay for what they received on tour through an order on 13 November 1926. Parry codified hnatlan which was voluntary labour for the chiefs in constructing their houses or private works. Furthermore, Parry codified upas and ramhuals to follow the chief on journeys as a customary law.

The judicial power of chiefs were also being undermined with kohran upas who would hold cases and settle disputes between individuals. Parry codified another policy that upas have no authority to hold or settle cases and that the authority is only granted to chiefs and the courts in Aizawl and Lungleh. Parry also refused to grant review to the decisions made by chiefs in the settlement of customary courts when individuals appealed to him as superintdent.

=== Excluded Areas and Inner Line Regulation ===
In 1925, the Inner Line Regulation was amended to protect the Lushai Hills district. It was derived initially after the Lushai Expedition under section 2 of the Bengal Eastern Frontier Regulation 1873. It was an attempt to exercise political control over the Lushai Hills and chiefdoms. The rationale was to prevent traders, merchants, farmers and subjects from crossing into Lushai territory and deteriorating relations with the chiefdoms. This would also allow for the British to guarantee boundaries of their dominion and assure security of their subjects and possessions. As the border was too informal with the chiefdoms, the British declared a unilateral declaration with the inner line. One of the objectives of this regulation is to prevent the holding of land and assimilation of their culture and tradition beyond this inner line by 'strangers'. The Inner Line has, for this reason, protected the Lushai Hills from commercial exploitation of land and forest resources from merchants, traders and other tribes.

=== Academic Development ===
The middle schools in Aizawl and Lungleh had begun to fail to satisfy the Lushais in pursuit of higher education. The demand emerged shortly after World War One but was not acted upon by superintendents who felt it lacked justification despite the encouragement of the Welsh Mission. In 1929 the Welsh Mission sent an official request to the superintendent for a high school which was refused by the administration. In 1931 the chiefs submitted a joint representation the Commissioner of Surma Valley, Hezlett. Hezlett was of the opinion that a high school would produce more educated Lushais than jobs can be distributed in the Lushai Hills. As a result, higher education was not prioritised until A.R.H MacDonald would become superintendent.

As a result of this decision, the wealthy Lushai families sent their children outside the district to pursue higher studies. The exposure to other organizations led to the need for a Lushai organisation to pressure the government on various areas of improvement. In October 1924, the Lushai Student's Association was founded in Shillong with branches in Calcutta and Gauhati. The Lushai Students Association held a conference at Shillong in the same month where Bucchawna was assigned the dual post of general secretary and treasurer. The Calcutta branch consisted of Dahrawka, Kailuia Sailo and Sangkunga. The Gauhati branch consisted of Durra, Chongthu and Buchhawna Khiangte. The Shillong branch was the largest with the most notable member being Thanglura.

=== McCall's Developments of the Lushai Hills ===
Superintendent McCall was the administrator of the Lushai Hills district from 1933 to 1943. His administration saw four major innovations in the Lushai Hills. These were the Ten Point Code, the Welfare System under the aegis of the Red Cross, the Lushai Hills Cottage Industries and the inauguration of the Chief's Durbar. These innovations were introduced to unify the Lushai identity and to support Governor of Assam Robert Reid's vision of transforming the excluded tribal zones into a separate Crown Colony. Reid's plan received considerable political interest but was dropped at the onset of World War Two.

The Ten Point Code was established and taught in schools to children. The purpose was to cultivate Lushai identity for potential nationhood and preservation of Mizo culture and customs. The code was also implemented into choirs, poetry and song. The welfare committees in villages also recite two points of the code every monthly meeting. The code was also intended to remedy traits of Lushai culture that were backward and incohesive for a national identity.

Ten Point Code
Point	Code
1	We desire to maintain a wholesome respect for all that is best in our indigenous culture, which bears the stamp of the hardly learned experience of our brave forefathers over time immemorial.
2	We desire to inspire in our people an ambition to maintain a true sense of proportion as to what wants and desires are reasonable in relation to our own natural resources and industry.
3	We desire to maintain strict loyalty to our Chief in all things lawful, and in all his efforts on behalf of his people, in return for which the Chief will serve the interests of his people so that he may continue to rule.
4	We desire to inculcate into one and all that we should display the same sense of loyalty to our whole village community as we desire to practise towards our own families.
5	We desire to do all in our power to foster the indigenous spirit of Tlâwmngaihna in our midst.
6	We desire to integrate into our daily lives, within the indigenous framework of our social systems, what modern science and knowledge have discovered, by strengthening and safeguarding our characters, health, home, crops, industry and possession.
7	We desire to seek all useful channel for the greater use of our leisure time so they by industry we may bring advtange to our families and villages and relieve our womenfolk of harder work.
8	We desire to unite all in contesting our common tendency to be Mi hlem hle while retaining pride in the sincere achievement of all manly and courageous feats, especially those undertaken for the protection of our community.
9	Those of us who are Christians agree to recognise that we should bow to the authority of those who introduced us to it, and that we shall be disloyal if we do not submit to discipline.
10	We desire to inculcate into our community the need for self-control and avoidance of excesses, to cultivate true spirit in willing service and discipline into young men who are the nation of the future.

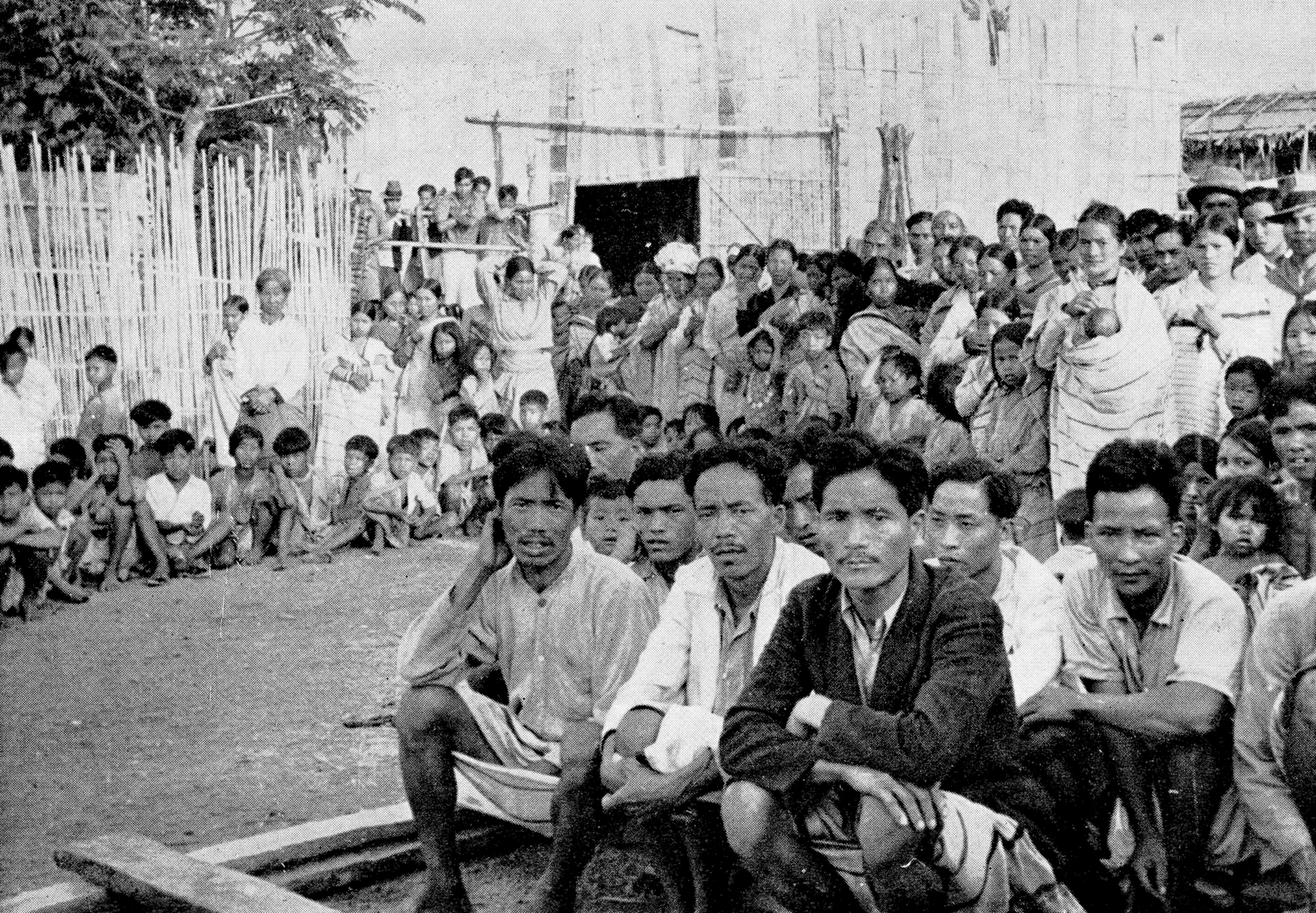
Lushai village welfare meeting.

The rationale for implementing the Village Welfare System was twofold. The first reason was that it was an egalitarian way of bringing people together socially on the subject of health. The second reason was to encourage the Chiefs to cooperate on an uncontroversial matter. The stipulation held legitimacy by allowing the villages to join the welfare system voluntarily but being obligated to follow the rules upon joining.

Village welfare was introduced due to the fact that only 3% of the Lushai population had access to permanent contact to amenities. The civil surgeon was in charge of the village welfare system, who oversaw all matters of public health and living conditions for the benefit of the villagers. The village welfare committees function under the guidance of the Red Cross district committee in Aizawl. All committee decision-making was unanimous and implemented by the villagers in religious, social, and technical harmony. All welfare committees have the village chief as president, leaders of the church and school, pensioners, and two village women and two village men in membership.

The Lushai Hills Cotton Industry initiative was too risky for government funds and was privately financed by McCall and his wife, who formed as a joint organizer and managing director of the venture to cultivate craftsmanship and broader market opportunities to export loom products.

The British policy of diminishing chieftain power by granting chieftain rights to collaborators and other individuals increased the number of chiefs from 60 to 400 in the 1890s to the 1930s. The large number of chiefs required a system of coordination and consultation. This led to the creation of the District Chief's Durbar. Each Chief will ascend to the durbar by signing a document affirming loyalty to the British Crown and the Lushai people. The durbar was designed for chiefs to become responsible for studying the conditions and lives of people under their jurisdiction and to unify the Chiefs in looking after the wellbeing of the Lushai people in general. The Durbar was assigned to meet twice yearly at a convenient meeting place for all chief circles. It would last seven to ten days and, in an advisory capacity, make decisions offered to the superintendent.

October 1940 Chief's Durbar elections
Circle	name	clan	village
Aizawl subdivision
Circle I	Lalsailova	Sailo	Kelseih
Circle I	Kamlaiana	Sailo	Tachhip
Circle II	Khawkunga	Chenkual	Pukpui
Circle II	Ngurliana	Sailo	Kolasib
Circle III	Hrangtinaia	Hmar	Vaitin
Circle III	Laltinkhuma	Sailo	Lailak
Circle IV	Awksarala	Sailo	Phullen
Circle IV	Hrangchhuma	Sailo	Khawdungsei
Circle V	Thlahthiauva	Hualngo	Khuangleng
Circle V	Thanglianga	Sailo	Tlangsam
Circle VI	Thangchuanga	Sailo	Biate
Circle VII	Lalzuala	Sailo	Baktawng
Circle VIII	Saihnuna	Sailo	Mualcheng
Circle IX	Ngurchhina	Sailo	Thenzawl
Circle X	Lalbuanga	Sailo	Kanghmun
Circle XI	Lalluaia	Sailo	Reiek
Lunglei Subdivision
Circle XII	Laldula	Sailo	Buarpui
Circle XIII	Thanzama	Sailo	Thiltlang
Circle XIV	Sena	Sailo	Sekhum
Circle XIV	Taikhuma	Ralte	Pukpui
Circle XV	Khuahupa	Pawi	Cheural
Circle XV	Lalsailova	Fanai	Lungleng
Circle XVI	Achhuma	Fanai	Tawipui
Circle XVII	Chungmunga	Lakher	Serkawr
Circle XVIII	Lianhnuna	Palian	Tiante

=== Young Lushai Association ===
The liberal and progressive nature of A.G McCall led to the development of Lushai community organizations. The increase in education and the influence of the Young Men's Buddhist Association in Burma led to the creation of the Young Lushai Organization on 4 June 1935. The YLA was not a political organization but a cultural one. It was originally consisting of the sons of chiefs before becoming populated with commoners. The organization developed a view against the institution of Lushai chieftainship which would influence its members who would go on to found the Mizo Union on the same policy and ideology such as Vanlawma.

=== World War Two ===
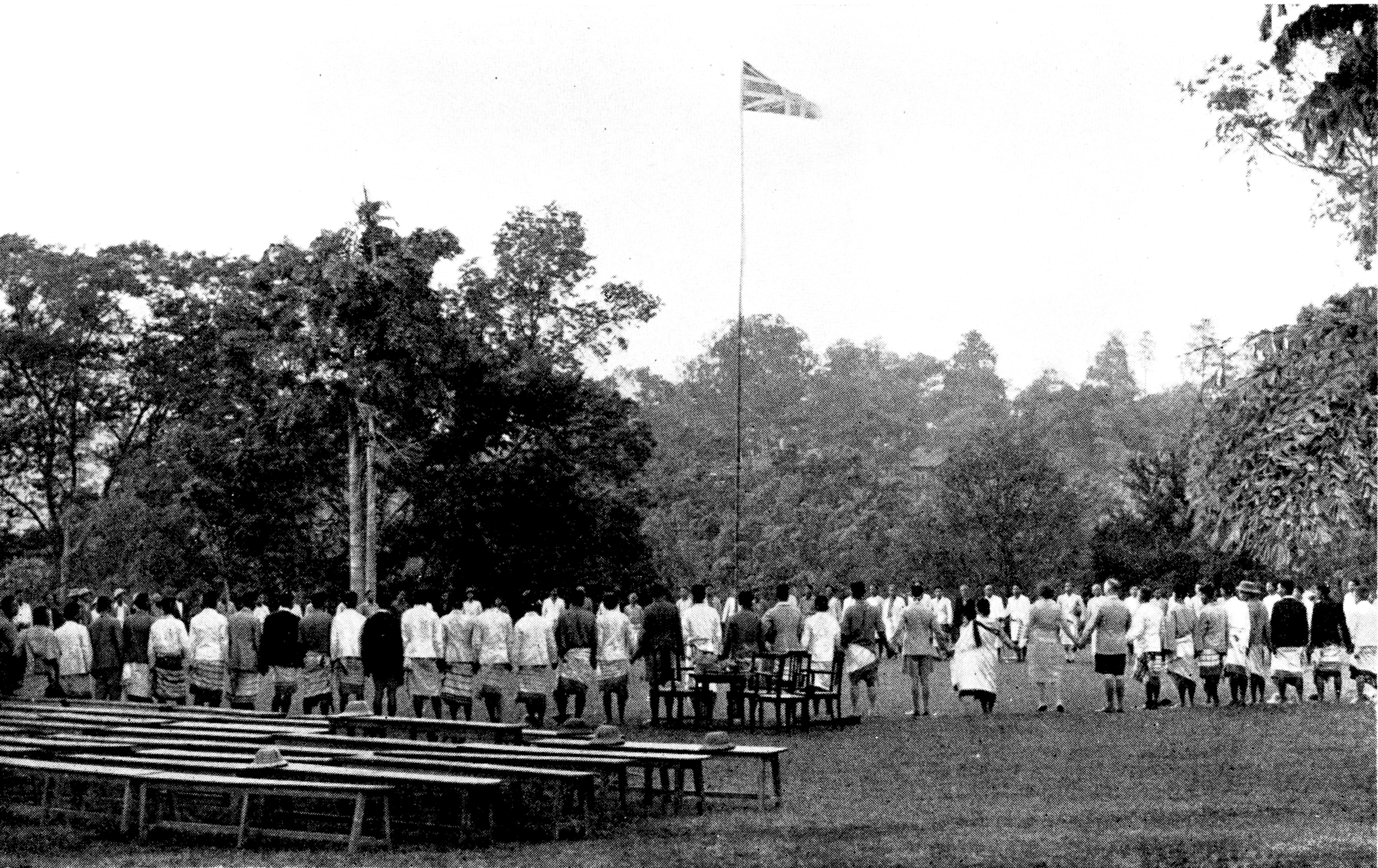
Lushai chiefs pledge allegiance to the Union Jack during World War II.

In April 1942, the Imperial Japanese Army had occupied much of Colony of Burma and pushed the British back into the Northeastern Regions of India. Superintendent of the Lushai Hills, Major Anthony Gilchrist McCall, brought 300 tribal chiefs and asked them to join in a voluntary bond with the British Crown and to sign a promise to join in a "Total Defence Scheme" (TDS) of the area. McCall was recalled under protest by the Governor of Assam Andrew Clow in May 1943, his position being transferred to Shillong instead. However, in his absence, the Total Defence Scheme was held throughout the war. McCall argued that without loyalty to the British, the TDS would collapse and that the Lushai Hills would not resist Japanese occupation if the British military were to retreat as they did in British Malaya, Singapore and Colony of Brunei.

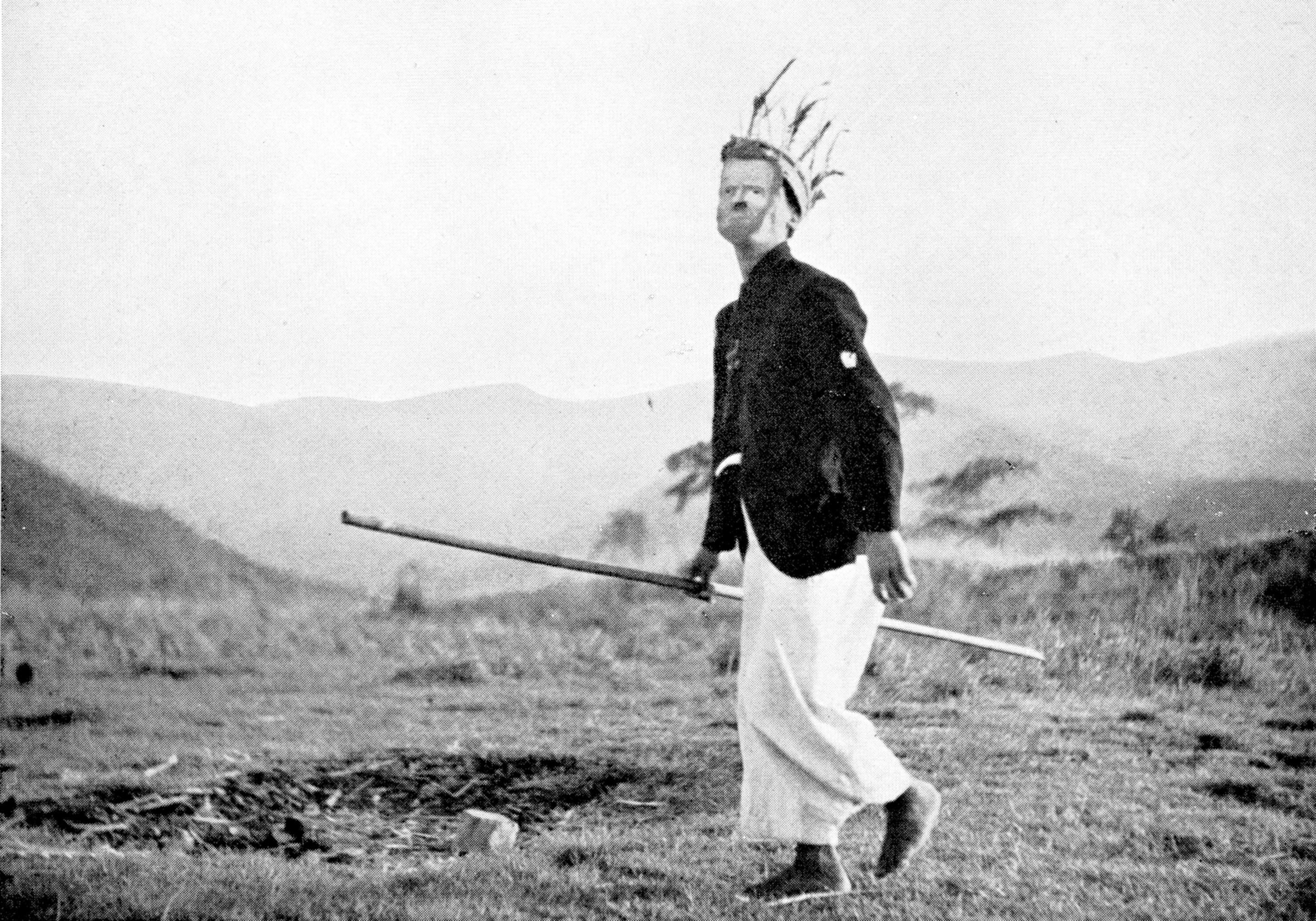
A Lushai reenactement of Winston Churchill's speech.

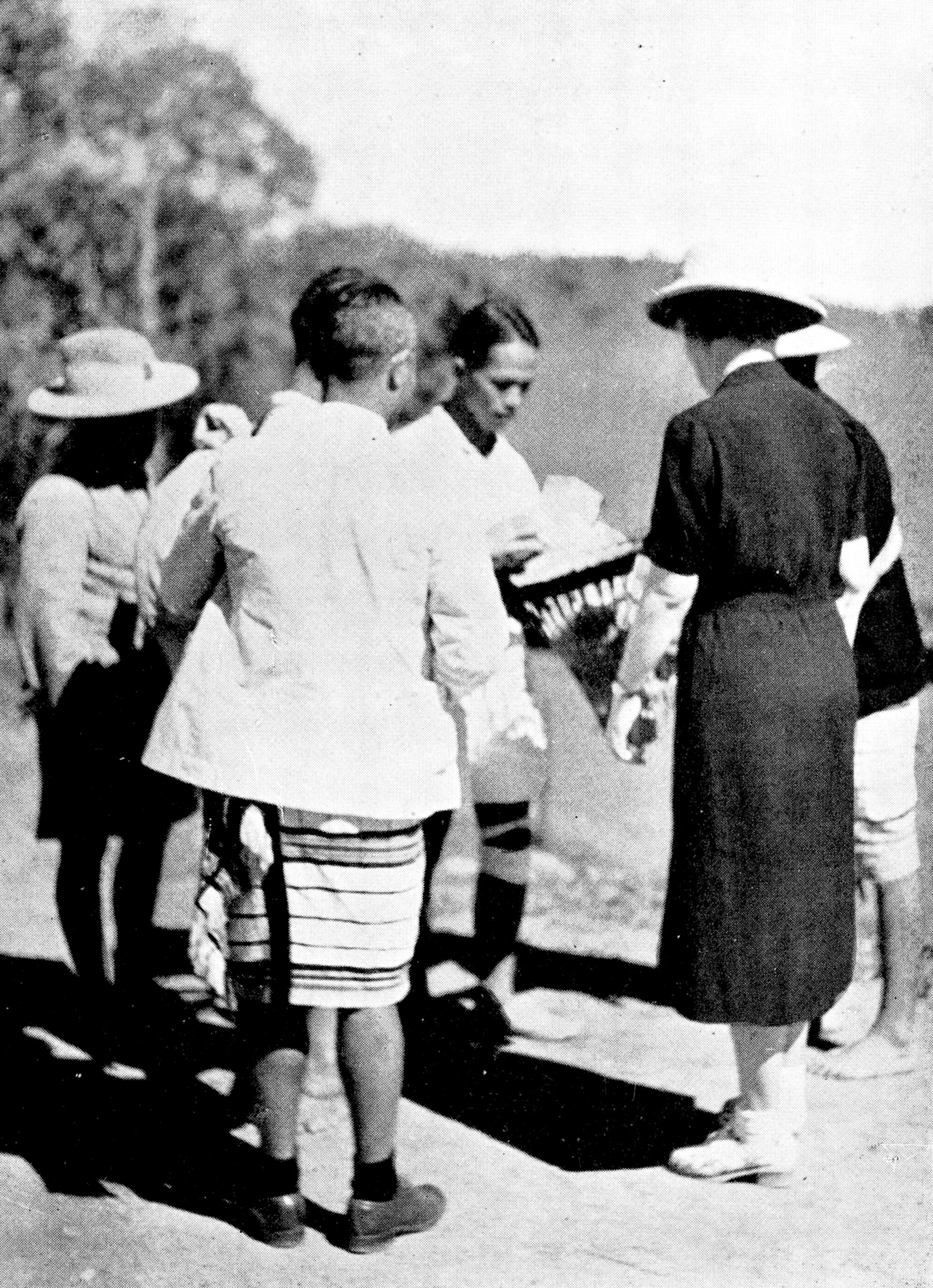
Superintendent's wife giving gifts to Lushai recruits in World War II.

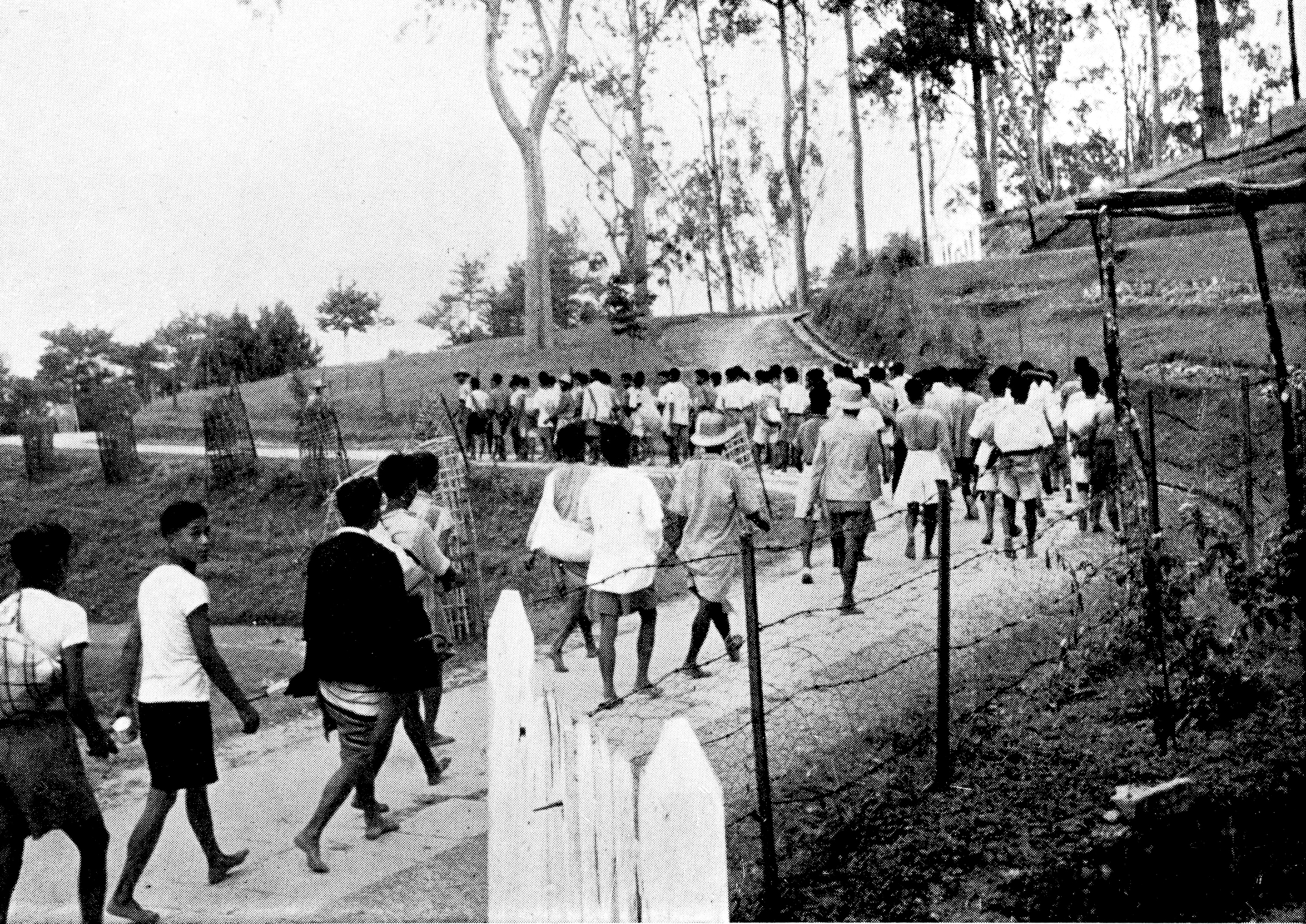
Lushai recruits making a journey to enlist for World War II.

The Total Defence Scheme involved guerilla warfare, strategic abandonment of villages, scorched earth tactics with denial of food and water, booby traps, destruction of bridges and exclusive information supplied to British authorities. McCall explicitly states to Chiefs to arm the bravest with guns and rifles and not directly confront enemies but to rely on knowledge of the terrain for effective ambush tactics. The Total Defence Scheme functioned on an asymmetrical warfare doctrine as a result. McCall's scheme was made in mind that tribal people did not possess up-to-date arms, were not professionally trained in military affairs and lacked vital air support and reconnaissance in comparison with the Japanese. The Lushai tribesmen were trained by Australian military personnel, such as Colonel Percival Augustus Parsons, in guerilla warfare. The scheme was successful as the Japanese retreated from the borderlands of India in late 1944.

The Japanese had occupied the villages of Darkhai, Khuangpah and Teikhang on the Lushai border in Burma. This prompted the settlements of Champhai, Biate, Darzo, Hnahlan, Khuangpah, Pawlrang, Samthang, Sawleng, Tipaimukh, Thingsai, Tuisenhnar and Vanlaipai to establish Pasalṭha pawl. Corps of the Lushai Scouts known as Biate Sipai were raised to support this with 300 raised in Biate alone. In total, 3000 youths had joined the military forces. The importance of the Lushai Hills as a frontier for the Japanese invasion of India led to military investments. As a result, Aizawl, Kolasib, Lunglei and Tlabung became vital supply bases. Zorema also argues that the exposure to foreign troops and the investments in military infrastructure opened up the Lushais to a politically conscious future.

In 1944, the British formed the Lushai Scouts. The task was given to Major Jack Longbottom. He was instructed to raise a regiment of scouts consisting of 400 men. The Japanese had already pushed into Tidim in the Chin Hills and were battling in Kohima and Imphal. The Lushai Scouts were placed under "V" Force to be used as guerillas but trained and raised as regular troops. The scouts were specialised into jungle warfare on mobility and minimum transport. Major Longbottom travelled to Aizawl before reaching Biate on the frontier of the Chin Hills. In March 1944 the unit was agreed to be formed from the General Headquarters in Delhi. Most of the scouts consisted of 18-20-year-old men. They were assigned patrol exercises in the Chin Hills and improvised in making bridges to cross the Tui river in order to maintain patrol timings. The scouts committed small raids on the Japanese on the main Tiddim road.

On 7–8 September, the scouts would march 15 miles through jungles in between two Japanese artillery companies with a platoon post. At dawn the outpost was attacked with noc casualties from the scouts. The Japanese retaliated with a stronger platoon in Saizang. Two Lushai scouts speaking Chin disguised themselves as vegetable merchants and supplied information on the platoon and sentries. An attack later carried was successful with only four wounded. The Scouts later occupied Kennedy Peak and cooperated with the Free Chin Resistance fighters to overrun a platoon. After the war, the Lushai Scouts were disbanded in Shillong. It recorded 51 encounters with the enemy with the casualty of a British officers and two other ranksand 23 wounded. Major J Longbottom was given a certificate signed by Chief Lalkhama of Darzo with the national garment Puanchei and bag (Iptechei).

Lushai volunteer distribution across units
Unit	Lushai volunteers
Assam Regiment	1272
Indian Army Medical Corps	772
Burma Army	581
Assam Rifles	340
Lushai Scout Group	309
Other unit corps	168
Airforce	52
Navy	27
W.A.C	20
Auxiliary Nursing	10
Total: 3551

=== Azad Hind ===
Of the Mizos employed in the military by the British, 60 were assigned to the south east Asian theatre in various regiments. The exact number of Mizos captured by Japanese forces and placed into the Indian National Army is unknown. However, the most prominent members were Darthawma, Biakliana, Dr Saitawna, Dr Rosiama and Kapthanga. One prominent captured individual who refused to join the INA was Vanhlira who refused to join in a meeting with Bose. Saitawna was captured in Burma by the British. Rosiama was similarly captured by the British in Burma and formally surrendered two months after imprisonment. Darthawna, Biakliana and Kapthanga continued to fight under Bose until the conclusion of World War Two. As a result, the three of them were awarded recognition as Indian Freedom fighters with pensions.

=== District Council ===
Alexander Ranald Hume MacDonald as superintendent of the Lushai Hills supported the crown colony scheme formulated by Professor Coupland. MacDonald built upon McCall's chief's durbar by introducing representatives who were commoners in equal number to the chiefs. This was done to pacify the people as a reward for their services in the total defence scheme and the war effort contribution. The district council would mark the official beginning of political participation for the Lushai people.

The district council consisted of 20 representatives elected by chiefs in their circles and another 20 representatives elected by the commoners. Two electoral colleges were established to allocate voting and seats for each. The Electoral College of the Commoners was constituted of ten houses that would nominate one elector who would then vote for a commoner to represent them.

=== First District Council Elections ===
District Council Results January 1946
Circle	Chiefs	Village	Commoners	Village
1.	Lalsailova	Kelsih	Dr. Dahrawka	Aijal
2.	Khhawkunga	Bukpui	Kapthianga Clerk	Chaltang
3.A.	Lamlira	Hmuizawl	Thangzika	Sawleng
3.B.	Lalindia	Khawruhlian	Khenkhama	Phuaibuang
4.A.	Awksarala	Phullen	Ranga	Saitual
4.B.	Lalzidinga	Ngopa	Vaitlia	Khawdungsei
5.	Vanhnuaithanga	Kelkang	Manliana	Zotlang
6.	Suakhnuna	Lungpho	Lalchhawnzova	Chalrang
7.	Tlanglianchhuma	Hualtu	Liantudaia C.I.	Baktawng
8.	Saihnuna	Mualcheng	P. Saitawna	North Vanlaiphai
9.	Lalthawvenga	Sailam	Lalzuia	Sialsuk
10.	Ngurchhinna	Khawrihnim	Lalbuaia	Lungleng
11.	Lalbuanga	Tukkalh	Zahlira Pastor	Tukkalh
12.	Lalthangdula	Buarpui	Rokawnga	Vanhne
13.	Lalbuana	Thingsai	Khuanga Pastor	Thitlang
14.	Taikhuma	Pukpui	R. Dengthuama	Pukpui
15.	Thangkunga	Lungtian	Aithura	Muallianpui
16.	Aichhuma	Tawipui	Ch. Saprawnga	Theiriat
17.	Suakhnuna	Serte	Rohmingliana	Tlabung
18.	Chhungmunga	Serkawr	Laithuama	Tuipang

=== Political movements ===
The growth of the Young Lushai Association saw a radical faction forming who wished to participate in politics. On 12 April 1946, the Lushai Commoner's Union inspired by the Burmese organization, the General Council of Buddhists Association was formed. On April 9, 1946, Vanlawma took permission of the superintendent A.R.H MacDonald in Aizawl to organize a meeting of the commoners. As a result, Vanlawma, Dahrawka and H.P Sailo organised a commoners meeting. Vanlawma was a member of the Young Lushai Association and the first matriculate of the Lushai Hills. Another group led by an individual known as Saprawnga was not granted permission to do so in Lunglei. Saprawnga was not granted due to MacDonald's concerns over his strong following and the lack of political control outside of Aizawl. Saprawnga would subsequently become the chief executive member of the district council of the Mizo district. Other prominent leaders would include C. Chhunga the first chief minister of the Union Territory of Mizoram, Khawtin Kuma and Bawichuaka.

The party operated under a democratic constitution and functioned through elected representatives. In every big village there were units and branches of the party established. Members would deposit payment and donations to the party fund. The Young Lushai Association on 8 February 1945, shortly before the formation of the Lushai Commoner Union sent a delegate to the superintendent A.R.H MacDonald demanding that village elders be elected rather than appointed by chieftain privilege. Accompanying demands included an end to forced labour, and outdated imperial levies. Superintendent MacDonald agreed to the terms and arranged a forum to address the political matters. On 14 January 1946 the Lushai Commoner's Union and the chiefs elected 24 representatives and convened a district conference.

The general meeting of the party in 1946 convened and they formally changed the name of the Lushai commoner's party to the Mizo Commoner's party before shortening into the Mizo Union. This decision had been credited with the popularisation of the term Mizo over the anglicised misnomer of Lushai. The policy of opposing chieftainship alienated many chiefs who initially participated in the Mizo Union and led to Superintendent MacDonald pushing back on a perception of radicalisation and destabilisation of the system of indirect rule.

On the 25–26 April 1946, a conference and election was made for the party. Pachhunga became president, Lalhlema became vice-president, Vanlawma was general secretary, Lalbuiaia was assistant secretary and Thanga was treasurer. The meeting also saw the objective of the party outlined:

- To guide and lead the Mizo people and ultimately to attain an independent Mizoram.
- To bridge the gap between the ordinary Mizo chiefs and their ministers.
- To create better understanding among all the Mizo regardless of localities.
- To improve the Mizo language so that the Mizo culture might be better understood and continued.
- To establish a press in order to publish papers and other materials beneficial to all the Mizo people.

The initial activities of the Mizo Union were originally localised in Aizawl. The party spread their influence through hla (songs or poetry), consisting of slogans of their policies and aims. A draft constitution known as Rorel Khawl which was rejected by the Governor of Assam for being too ambitious. The Mizo Union also brought attention to the Lushai Hills. Vanlawma was invited by Reverend J.J Nichols Roy to Shillong. At Shillong Vanlawma was approached by S.B. Choudhuri, an editor of the Shillong Times who asked elementary questions on the Mizos as they were unknown to the rest of India even to Shillong. Vanlawma received a front-page news article on the creation of the Mizo Union in the Shillong Times which Choudary described as a 'political feat'. Vanlawma became a special correspondent to the Shillong Times and the Hindustan Standard in Calcutta. During this time Vanlawma met with the Assam Communists at his hostel after being invited by them. Vanlawma would also meet with the Khasi leaders under direction of Superintendent Macdonald to write a constitution of a relationship between the tribes. However, the Khasi leaders did not cooperate by citing that the Khasi hill people were more progressed with wealth and education but that they were willing to lead the Mizos to unite. The meeting with the leaders was fruitless as they did not write a constitution or follow through which disappointed Vanlawma.

=== Meeting with Bordoloi ===
The partition of India became a contentious topic for the future of the hill tribes. The Assam State Chief Minister Gopinath Bordoloi began to cooperate with the Khasi, Garo, Mizo and Naga on the direction of their political future. Vanlawma met with Bordoloi in Shillong to talk of the desire of the Mizo people. The question of independence had not been broached at this time, but Vanlawma decided to provide Bordoloi with the answer that the Mizos would ascend to India rather than Pakistan. Vanlawma argued that this arrangement would mean the Mizo people would desire significant autonomy to protect themselves from Indian dominance and exploitation. Bordoloi agreed to Vanlawma's proposal.

=== Developments of the Mizo Union ===
The first general assembly of the Mizo Union was summoned on 24 September 1946 with two representatives from each sector of the Lushai Hills district. There were 700 representatives at the first general election. Internal problems also began to plague the Mizo Union. The first president of the Mizo Union, Pachhunga was criticed for not being well educated to hold the position of President. An intellectual group within the Mizo Union led by Saprawnga and college graduates had formed and this faction of the Mizo Union criticized the leadership of the party for being uneducated. Pachhunga attempted to resign from the complaints but was persuaded to preside over the first general meeting. Vanlawma, Dahrawka, and Sailo's meeting was held at Thankthing M.E School, and there was a large attendance. Superintendnt A.R.H. Macdonald attended the meeting. MacDonald spotted the pamphlet of the Mizo Union, which discussed abolishing the ramhual class of Mizo chieftainship. Macdonald became alarmed at the Mizo Union challenging the status quo and the status of chieftainship. As a result, the meeting was kicked out of the school. It was argued that allowing the meeting to take place in the government school building would make the chiefs believe the views of the Mizo Union were sanctioned by the government, hence provoking the response MacDonald gave. The meeting was subsequently continued in a nearby Zawlbuk. Public opinion on Lushai chieftainship had begun to sour, and tolerance decayed for chiefs using power and authority on behalf of the British, which appeared increasingly autocratic. The meeting was also attended by Mr. Sakhrie, the secretary to the Naga National Council. The Nagas originally kept contact with the Mizo politicians for an opportunity to fight for independence as a common cause for their people.

The results of the meeting elected the Mizo Union Party councillors. Pacchunga, the president of the Mizo Union, K.T Dawla, Zairema from Dawrpui Veng, Reverend Chhuahkhama from Mission Veng, Thangliankhama from Kulikawn Veng, Ranga from Saitual, Vanlalbuka from Sihphir, R.B. Chawnga from Tuahzawl and Vankeuva from Sialsuk. While the Mizo Union began to establish itself, A.R.H. MacDonald convened a meeting for the district council on 7–8 November 1946. The meeting intended to form a constitution of Vantlang Rorel Khawl. MacDonald claimed that through the constitution the crown colony can protect Mizoram from falling under the Indian government. MacDonald stated: "I am afraid that Mizoram is going to vanish unless the Mizoram learn the democratic system while the British are here. Therefore, we the British must teach the democratic system to the Mizo leaders".

MacDonald also established the MacDonald scheme or Rorelkhawl. This was a constitution managing the executive, legislature, judiciary institutions for a fully fledged government. The scheme consisted of a legislature of chiefs and commoners to make laws and levy taxes. The executive would consist of an auditor, a minister and three councillors. The three councillors would be the head of a ministry in either the Department of Agriculture, Arts, Industries, Trade, Forest and Fisheries, Department of Public Works and Communications and Department of Education and Health. There would be a 33-member council and "historian" to act as its secretary. A governor with direct responsibility of judiciary would be head of state holding office for 16 years as a term. The auditor and minister for 4 years and the councillors for a term of 3 years. Lastly a public service commission would be established for the recruitment of public personnel with the auditor as chairman and two retired public servants as members. The first meeting of the District Council was on 18 January 1946 where MacDonald instated himself as president. However, before MacDonald could secure a unanimous approval on the constitution, the commoners opposed the draft as not agreeing to equal seats as chiefs. The outcome of the conference led to the establishment of an advisory council known as Hnawhchhuah Ngaituah Pawl in every village. The responsibility of the council was to advise the chief in matters of expulsion of undesirable individuals from the villages. The meeting also concluded that all families are obligated to pay the fathang (paddy tax) except government workers, teacher, pastors and salvation army personnel. The tax would be ₹2 for those that didn't cultivate crops. MacDonald had also deposed five chiefs. Three of these chiefs were deposed due to their collaboration with the Japanese and treated as traitors, and two chiefs had become too old to lead their villages. The removal of chiefs led many individuals to advocate for MacDonald to pursue political reforms. Hualzakham was branded a traitor and jailed, as well as being deposed.

The proposals failed to gain agreement. The meeting lacked many of the Mizo leaders at the time, and many of them, such as Khawtinkhuma, president of the Mizo Union, were openly against the institution of chieftainship. Saprawnga attempted to negotiate with MacDonald by stating that if the commoners outnumbered the chiefs by having twice the representation, an agreement on the proposal could be reached. In return, MacDonald blamed the Mizo leaders for their agendas and for abandoning the welfare of the Mizo people. He argued that most Mizos aren't able to disagree with the current political intelligentsia. A second election was held for the Mizo Union, with Khawtinkhuma remaining president. The vice president would be an ex-Burmese military officer named Lalbiakthanga. Vanlawma tried to withdraw his name from the ballot box when Saprawnga nominated Vanthuama for the general secretary role. Equal votes were cast between both until Lalhlema the chairman cast his vote for Vanthuama.

=== Lushai Chiefs Council ===
The chiefs continued their meeting after the District Council meeting and established the Lushai Chiefs Council. The council was formed to defend the institution of Mizo chieftainship. The motto was "Heaven's Light our Guide" and held three objectives. These were to maintain the integrity and cooperation of chiefs, maintain cordial relationship between the government and the people, to safeguard customary Lushai laws and to maintain hereditary rights of chiefs and consider the general interest of all individuals. The following members constituted the council:

- Chairmain: Lalsailova Sailo, Chief of Kelsih
- Deputy Chairman: Awksarala Sailo, Chief of Phullen
- Secretary: Ngura Chongthu,. Chief of Durtlang
- Joint Secretary: Hrawva Khiangte, Chief of Aizawl
- Treasurer: Lalluia Sailo BEM, CHief of Reiek
- Finance Secretary: Khakhunga Chenkual, Chief of Bukpui
- Ex-officio members:
  - Lalkailuia Sailo, B.A. Assistant to the Superintendent
  - Hranglura Sailo, Sub Inspector of Police
  - Dr. Saichhunga Sailo, Assam Regiment
  - Captain Ṭhenphunga Sailo, Assam Regiment
  - Captain lalrinthanga Sailo, Assam Regiment.

=== Mizo Union Lakhipur Conference ===
A conference was arranged under H.K. Bawichhuaka in Lakhipur in Cachar. The purpose was to discuss the September conference on the district council of the Lushai Hills. Two resolutions were passed as a result. The territorial unity and solidarity of the whole Lushai population occupying the Lushai Hills, a part of Cachar, Manipur, and Chittagong Hill Tracts be maintained. The second resolution concerned that the Lushai Hills shall have full autonomy and self-determination with the province of Assam.

=== Bordoloi Committee ===
Gopinath Bordoloi requested Vanlawma to attend a meeting of all the representatives in Assam State to determine whether they preferred to join India or Pakistan. The meeting was held in Gauhati. Vanlawma and Khawtinkhuma would arrive in February 1947 as co-opted representatives of the Lushai Hills district. The invitation from Bordoloi infuriated Vanlawma who felt that Bordoloi no longer wished to give the Mizo Union full membership on thee Assam Advisory Sub-Committee. Vanlawma would ask Khawtinkhuma not to accept the co-opted membership but request full membership. However a second invitation arrived from Assam which replaced Vanlawma with Saprawnga as co-opted members. As a result, Khawtinkhuma and Saprawnga accepted co-opted membership in the Assam Advisory Sub-Committee to represent the Mizo people.

=== Vanlawma's public speech and debate ===
As a result, Vanlawma held a public meeting supporting the independence of the Mizo people. The speech also criticised Bordoloi for not allowing full representation of the Mizo people. Vanthuama began to debate Vanlawma on the possibility of independence as a small nation, and fighting a rebellion would be fruitless and destructive while stifling resources for economic growth. The sharp disagreement saw Mizo Union leaders side with Vanthuama. The southern localities of Aizawl were in agreement with Vanthuama against independence and the northern localities in Aizawl supported Vanlawma in independence. The meeting introduced the concept of the question of independence for Mizoram.

=== Divergence of ideology in the Mizo Union ===
Pachhunga convened a meeting of the Mizo Union under the assistant superintendent Sainghinga in the Bengali Theater Hall in Aizawl. The question of meeting discussed the issue of independence. Church leaders, teachers and other individuals participated in the meeting, totalling 200. Pachhunga, Dahrawka and Hmartawnphunga argued on the premise that union with India would see a dominant culture absorb their identity and way of life. As a result, they encouraged a serious commitment to MacDonald's proposed constitution as a Crown Colony of the British as they believed this would protect the Mizo people and their land.

Superintendent MacDonald wanted a second election for the calendar year 1947. The second annual election saw Khawtinkhuma and Vanluama both nominated for the role of president by the party. Some members encouraged Vanlawma to withdraw so that MacDonald would see the Mizo Union as one accord. However this idea became unpopular with the independence approving supporters of Vanlawma and preferred an election instead. In March 1947 a Mizo newspaper run by unionists reported that councillors must resign at the end of the calendar year which was December 1946. Vanlawma who was elected in January 1947 was forced to resign which caused controversy among the Mizo Union party.

The Mizo Union councillors who had been forced to resign met at Pachhunga's home on 24 March with vice president Zairema and other leaders. A consensus was reached that the forced resignations were unlawful and against the party constitution. A decision was taken to strip Khawtinkhuma, Zairema, Vanthuama and Lalbuaia of their positions on 25 March 1947. From the date onwards an interim group would lead the party until a general election was called which was headed by Pachhunga and Vanlawma as president and general secretary. As a result, the Mizo Union under Pacchunga became pro-independent while the party under Khawtinkhuma became pro-India during the political campaigning period.

Superintendent A.R.H. MacDonald was about to leave Mizoram on account of the expiration of his term. Before this, the Constitution's subadvisory committee was visiting Aizawl. The Committee consisted of Gopinath Bordoloi, N.V. Thakar, B.N. Rae, Mr. Ramadhyani, Reverend Nichols Roy, Mr Temjemaliba Ao with Khawtinkhuma and Saprawnga. The two Mizo factions were preparing memorandums for the Bordoloi committee. The faction under Pacchunga argued for independence due to the differences of Mizos and Indians and lack of history. Khawtinkhuma's faction submitted a memorandum hoping for a union with India and a request for a district council. A clause was inserted to revisit the decision in 10 years and opt out of the Indian Union.

The meeting was held in Kulikawn in southern Aizawl. B.N. Rao and Nichols Roy were the main speakers. Roy spoke on the future of the Mizos. He used his experience as a minister of public works in Assam to explain of the benefits of union with India. During question time Nichols Roy entertained a question from Sena. Sena asked about the Mizo's choice to be independent in which Roy reluctantly agreed to the prospect to respect the decision if taken. The meeting did not make any decisions. The Bordoloi Committee met in Shillong to make a final decision and agreement. Khawtinkhuma and Saprawnga on behalf of the Mizo people signed the agreement of becoming a union with India. However, Tenjemaliba Ao of the Nagas disagreed to become a union with India and left the meeting. A.Z. Phizo would visit the Mizos in Aizawl as he intended to work with them to secure independence for both. The visit was not significant as the Mizo Union leaders had already committed to a union with India. This stopped all opportunity of cooperation between the Nagas and Mizos and the Nagas arguably launched their independence movement in 1949.

=== MacDonald's departure ===
Due to the failure of gaining consensus and approval for his proposals from the district conference, MacDonald began to cooperate with the Mizo Union right wing. A public meeting was held on 21 February 1947 in Aizawl. It was chaired by Sainghinga the assistant superintendent along with Dahrawka and Hmartawnphunga with 200 Lushai leaders who were from the church or various school. The resolution of the meeting argued for independence to maintain their ethnic and cultural identity. An argument was made on the basis that the departure of the British would not protect the hill tribes from the influx of the Indians if the excluded areas were removed. The meeting declared that "the British Government is great refuse for the Mizos. Noone can tell the fate to which we could have been reduced had the British not helped in maintaining our identity."

MacDonald attempted to revive the District Council Conference. It had become functionally inactive after the Mizo Union had refused to cooperate with it from November 1946. As Superintendent he ordered that every ten houses in the village shall elect one representative who were then to elect the members of the District Council. The election dates to nominate members of the conference would be 6 February 1947. The elections to the Second District Council were scheduled to be held on 9 April for the Lunleh subdivision and 14 April for the Aizawl subdivision. The Mizo Union who opposed this convened a Block Officer's Conference between 4 and 5 April at the village of Sialsuk. The Mizo Union decided to abstain from the elections. Dengthuama gave a speech stating that:

"Our Superintendent has formed a District Conference which does not really represent the district because the number of seats is exactly equal for the commoners and the chiefs. Only 300 chiefs should have twenty seats and more than 1.5 laks people having the same number of seat is a definite injustice. So we cannot participate in that election. On 5 April we metand resolved that we cannot participate."

As a result of this declaration, the Mizo Union boycotted the second district council elections. There were no candidates from the Lunglei subdivision while 300 candidates from the Aizawl subdivision placed themselves on the ballot.

=== Second District Council election ===
District Council Results April 1947
Circle	Chiefs	Village	Commoners	Village
1.	Lalsailova	Kelsih	R. Vanlawma	Thakthing
2.	Khhawkunga	Bukpui	Zaia	Lungmuat
3.A.	Lamlira	Hmuizawl	Lianthangpuia	Saizawl
3.B.	Lalindia	Khawruhlian	Khenkhama	Phuaibuang
4.A.	Awksarala	Phullen	Pastor Liangkhaia	Saitual
4.B.	Lalzidinga	Khawdungsei	Laithuama	Tualcheng
5.	Laltawna	Bungzung	Manliana	Zotlang
6.	Lalthiama	Sialhawk	Chawlkhuma C.I.	Biate
7.	Lalzuala	Baktawng	Lalhmuaka	Lenchim
8.	Saihnuna	Mualcheng	Pastor Saitawna	Mualcheng
9.	Lalthawvenga	Sailam	Thanbuka	Sailam
10.	Vanhnuaithanga	Lungleng	Lalthangdula	Arte
11.	Lalbuanga	Tukkalh	Sena	hmunpui

=== Chieftainship and the UMFO ===
Groups of volunteers were established to campaign for the Mizo Union and popular issue of independence. Vankhama, Lalrinliana went to Sialsuk, Vanlalliana and Challeta went to Champhai, Ngura went to the northeast while Thangridema Thantuma went to Baktawng. However the intention of spreading the idea of independence was ineffective as most rural inhabitants had little to no interest in the future of the Lushai Hills. The volunteers noticed that the issue of chieftainship had become a topic of rural individuals becoming tired of working under chiefs.

==== Mizo Union split ====
A majority of the Mizo Union supported union with India. However towards independence, a faction known as the right wing formed out of the party. They consisted of businessmen located in Aizawl with links to chiefs who preferred alternatives to rule under India. Political scientist, Prof Coupland's Crown Colony Scheme became the initial source of support for this minority of the Mizo Union. The scheme would oversaw Zo-Kuki-Chin areas placed under a unified colony under British rule. Saprawnga and L.B Thanga formulated a scheme to carve out a new party known as the Mizo Union Council. This party would become the precursor to the United Mizo Freedom Organization who would be influenced by Burmese Mizos. A Burmese ex-military officer Lalbiakthanga formed the UMFO on 5 July 1947. Lalmawia Khiangte a former King's Commission Emergency Officer during WW2 British government held the position of general secretary. However, the party was known as Zalen Pawl, which meant the party of the privileged. They failed to make serious political gains to offset ascension to India.

=== Report of the Bordoloi Sub-Committee ===
Report of the Bordoloi Sub-Committee was submitted on 28 July 1947. It recommended for the formation of an autonomous district council for the Lushai Hills District. The council would be between 20 and 40 members and elected on the basis of adult franchise. The council would be empowered to form and enforce their own laws within their jurisdiction. The council furthermore was granted oversight on the institutions of chieftainship such as inheritance, succession and customary laws. The report further supported the creation of the Pawi-Lakher Regional Council in the southern area of the Lushai Hills.

=== L.L. Peters ===
After the departure of A.R.H. MacDonald, D.A. Penn became superintendent for a short period before Leonard Lamb Peters was assigned. Peters held a meeting on 14 August 1947 to discuss the options for the future of Lushai Hills, whether to remain with India, join Burma, or become independent. Amajority of the delegates at the meeting supported a union with India based on the belief that a guarantee can be maintained on the maintenance of existing safeguards on their customary laws and land rights. The meeting also oversaw a memorandum that allowed the Lushai Hills to opt out of the Indian Union in ten years based on a referendum. The assurance of the maintenance of the Chin Hills Regulation of 1896 and the Bengal Western Frontier Regulation of 1873 were maintained to preserve the Mizo identity.

=== Indian Independence ===
Plans had been made for the independence parade. The Mizo Union sought to carry out a celebration but were opposed by dissidents who supported independence namely the Mizo Union under Pachhunga. The Mizo Union branch of Dawrpui strongly opposed the celebration. Vanlawma wrote a letter to Khawtinkhuma to cease plans for the procession. A further notice was sent by the faction to Peters to inform him not to hoist the tricolour flag. The Mizo Union Dawrpui branch held a meeting with Christian hymns and prayers and sang of mobilising weapons to march. The group opposed the idea of a Christian people becoming part of a Hindu majority nation. Guns, grenades were collected to prevent the procession from happening. The matter continued to escalate until the Mizo Union president, Khatinkhuma, threatened to resign if the procession continued. The Indian flag was not hoisted openly out of fear of conflict. Three volunteers were stationed outside Superintendent Peter's bungalow ready to take down the Indian flag if he hoisted it. However, Peters stated that there was no flag to hoist. On the other hand, a farewell to the British was given in Dawrpui in Aizawl which hosted a large crowd. The Lushai Hills was succeeded as the autonomous Lushai Hills district of Assam.

== Economy ==
=== Lushai Hills Cotton Industries ===
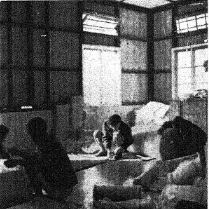
Lushai workers in the Reid House storage building.

The traditional Mizo tribes possessed talent in Mizo handicraft in cotton weaving. While the Bengal Home Industries Association of Calcutta attempted to leverage this talent, no agreement was reached. The District Officer took the initiative in commercializing and educating Mizo labourers in cotton production skills as a safeguard against the failure of rice crops. A cottage industries Organisation was financed privately by the district officer and his wife, who was personally versed in textiles. The decision to privately finance the cotton industry in the Lushai Hills stemmed from the central government's reluctance to invest in a venture and a need to curb Christian revivalism growing in communities.

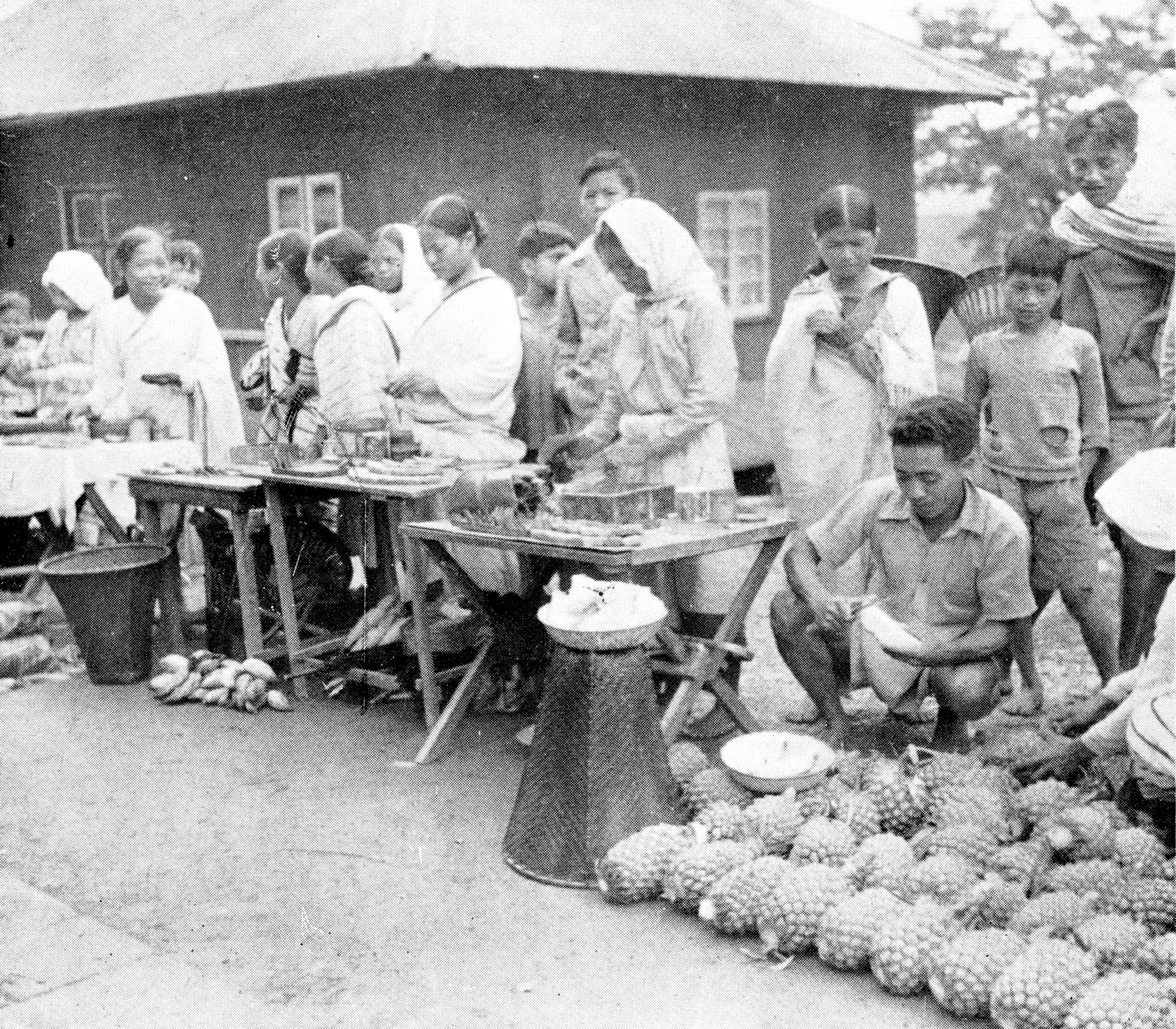
A Cotton bazaar situated in Aizawl for the Lushai Cotton Industries.

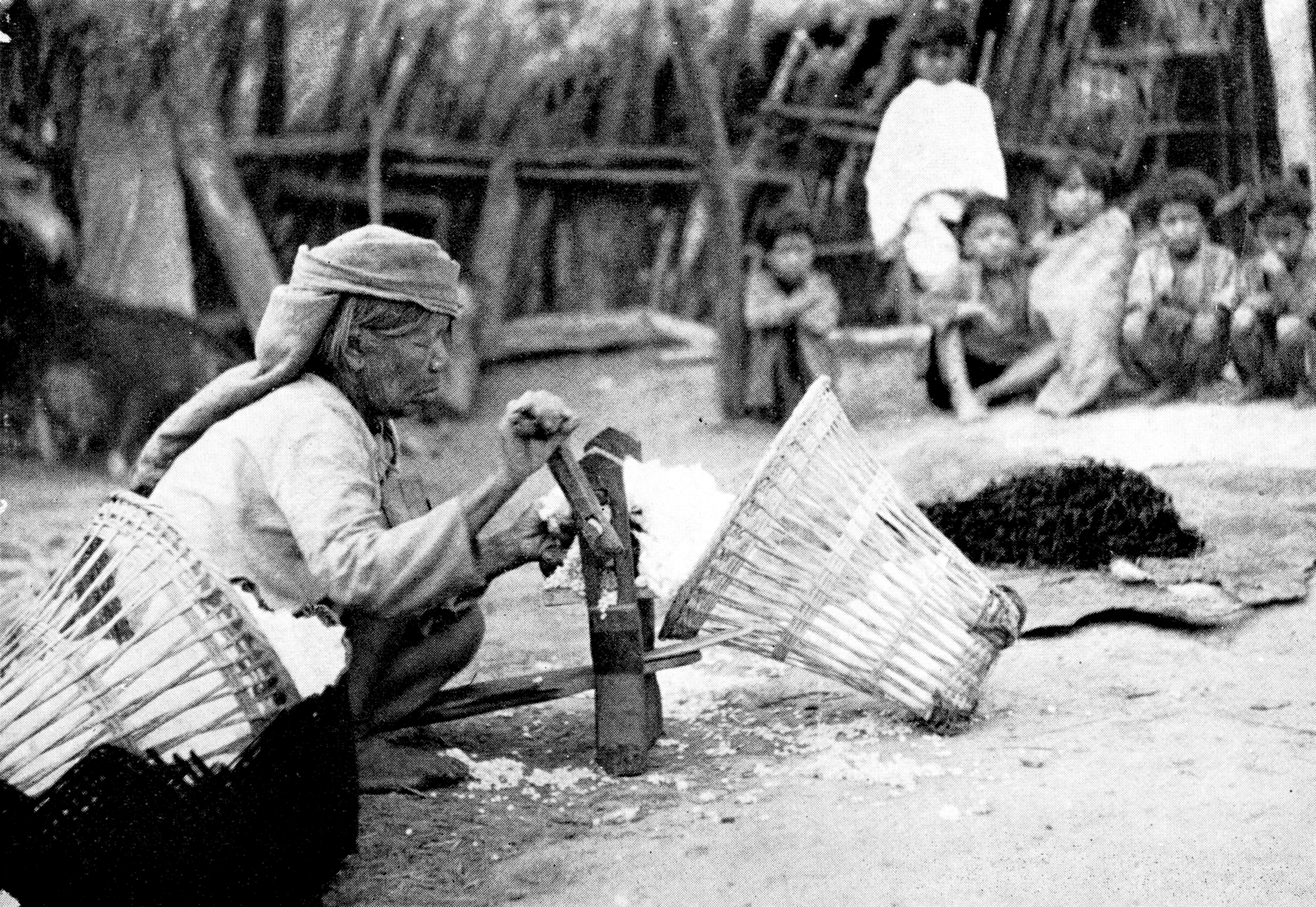
The hand ginning of cotton by Lushai workers.

In the months of leisure in the jhumming cycle, labourers would spend time producing a rug made of unspun, white, tufted, local cotton. The Lushai Hills Cotton Industries began to train and upskill Mizo labourers into looming craftmanship which as a domino effect led to craftsmen spreading these teachings to other villagers. Quality control of rug productions would see only 20% of rugs marketable and profitable. As a measure, rejections carried a guarantee of full market price if a second replacement rug of high quality could be submitted.

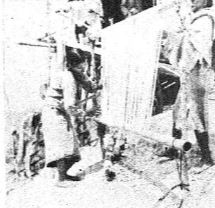
Separation of cotton with rice water.

The Imperial Tobacco Company assisted with the enterprise of cotton industries under the resident manager in India, R.G Baker who offered to accept first grade rugs as gifts in the coupon system of the company. This eased the trouble of marketability and exportation in the hilly and rugged terrain of the Lushai Hills. The saleability of rugs increased from 20% and began to compete with substandard rugs in the broader market. The product was now considered higher quality under hand spun cotton, tightly stuffed and bound by the woof.

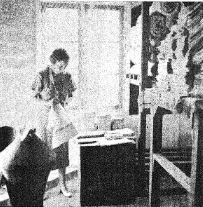
Mrs McCall organizing the Lushai Hills Cotton Industries Program.

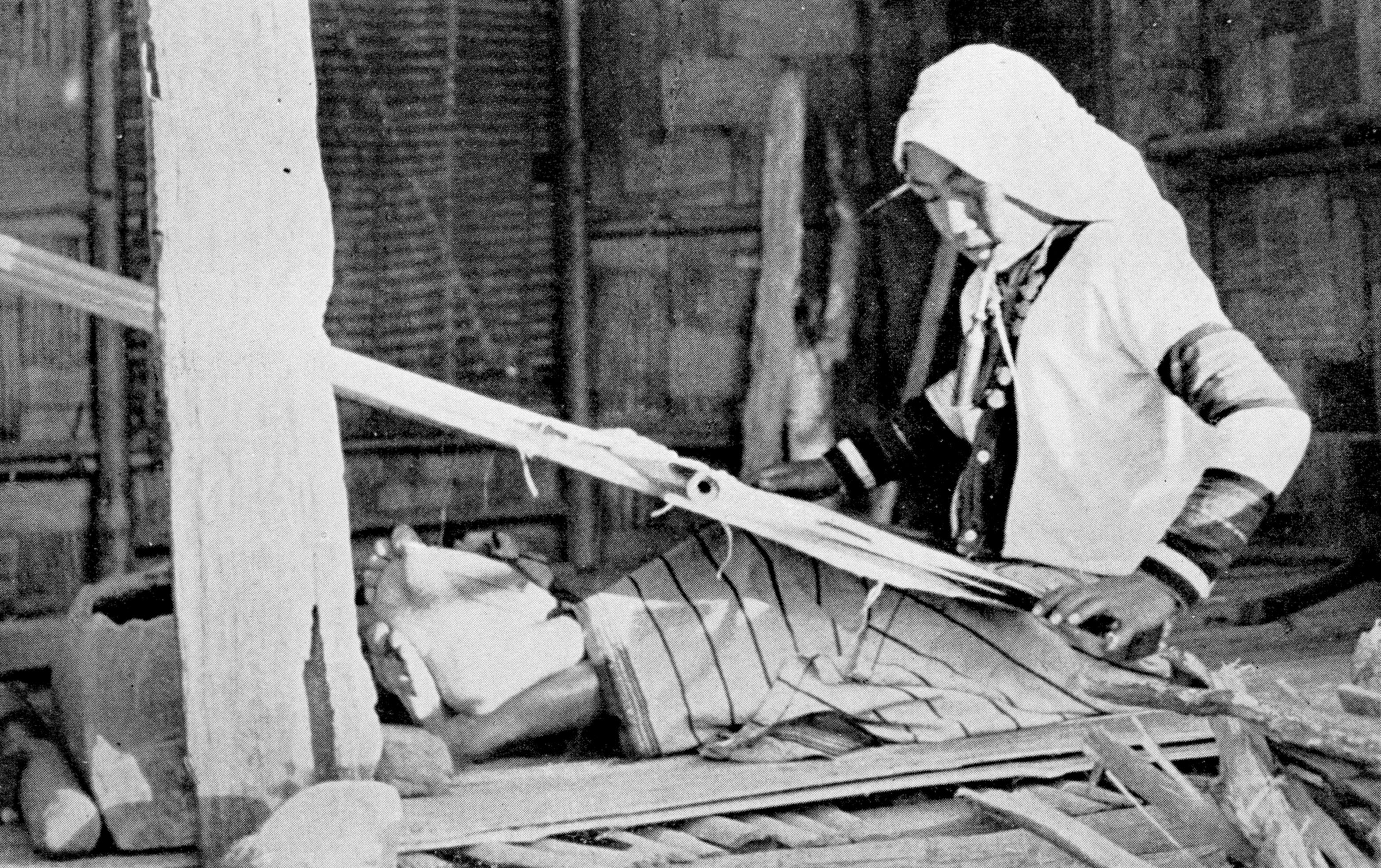
Lushai weaver with a tobacco pipe.

Lushai craftsmen in cotton industries were being sent to Calcutta to Dr. Boege, a general manager of a trading company, for training in synthetic saying. The growing industry prompted Governor of Assam Robert Reid and his spouse to become patrons with the construction of the Reid House to provide offices, workspace, stock rooms, packing and dyes. This supplied dyes for free with a specially trained dyer. The interests and influence of the Reid house promoted second cash bows to villages, improved employability and social status of women, employed the disabled and crippled, revival of Lushai hand-looming culture, and encouragement of research into the usage of natural resources of the Lushai hills into fields such as medicine, metalworking etc. Issues in the cotton industries were resolved with well off and influential individuals such as Chhuakhama, Pachhunga and Thanga who negotiated agreements with the Imperial Tobacco Company at their personal expense.

=== Urbanisation ===
The Mizos were historically a nomadic people. They would migrate from their traditional village sites every seven to ten years, according to J.M. Lloyd. The annexation of the Lushai Hills ended nomadism among the Mizos via various policies. Nag argues that the curbing of raiding and warfare among the tribes provided substantial security and confidence in law and order. Other factors such as the growth of the Church and beginning of education further complimented this change. The British government also surveyed Mizoram and finalized the issues of land ownership and competing claims. New processes of cultivation were introduced to the tribes and the growth of the administrative apparatus recruited Mizos into government offices and other spheres of influence. This change the traditional Mizo economy and provided security. The building of churches in villages also encouraged permanent residence. According to missionaries Clark and Chapman, the practice ofmoving villages fell into disuse when every village had its own church and were reluctant to abandon their worship site which they had built themselves. As a result, houses in villages were also permanently constructed.

The British also took responsibility for the construction of roads. The British initially began road construction during their military expeditions and operations for the purpose of administrative convenience. The first road constructed was the Aizawl-Changsil road with a distance of 16 miles. This was followed by the Aizawl-Silchar road via Duarbond completed in 1893.

In the Lushai Hills, the Mizo people traditionally used messengers to relay and communicate messages. After the British annexation a post office was established at Aizal and Changsil separately in 1890. Postal mail would be transported via mailrunners. In 1908 the superintendent of the Lushai Hills assumed charge as Superintendent of the Post Offices and Aizawl to improve post services. The post office continued to expand and by 1947 there were 14 branches of the post office in Mizoram. Telegraphs were installed in Mizoram in 1894 via Kolasib.

Roads in Mizoram-Chin Hills
Name	Distance	Time period
Sairang-Silchar	120 miles 193 km	1890s
Lunglei-Chittagong	140 miles 225 km	1890s
Haka-Kalawm	150 miles 241 km	1890s
Fort White-Tiddim	24 miles 39 km	1890s
Lunglei-Haka	130 miles 209 km	1890s
Haka-Kan	65 miles 105 km	1890s
Aizawl-Sairang	14 miles 22 km	1920s
Aizawl Station road	6 miles 10 km	1920s
Sairang Station road	2 miles 3 km	1920s
Lunglei Station road	2 miles 4 km	1920s
Demagiri Station road	1 miles 2 km	1920s
Aizawl-Changsil	6 miles 10 km	1930s
Aizawl-North Vanlaiphai	80 miles 129 km	1930s
Aizawl-Falam	103 miles 165 km	1930s
Aizawl-Lunglei	103 miles 165 km	1930s
Aizawl-Tipaimukh	72 miles 116 km	1930s
Lock's trace road	52 miles 83 km	1930s
Lunglei-Demagiri	42 miles 68 km	1930s
Lunglei-Haka	58 miles 93 km	1930s
Lunglei-Serkawr	67 miles 108 km	1930s
Dokham-Kolodyne	31 miles 50 km	1930s
Zongling-Tongkolong	42 miles 68 km	1930s
Tuiping-Chakhang	45 miles 72 km	1930s

== Education ==
The Christian missionaries headed the introduction of education under British rule. Reverend J.H. Lorrain and F.W. Savidge opened a co-ed primary school in Aizawl, the first school in Mizoram. The school was successful until the two missionaries were recalled to Assam, leading to its shutdown. The school was revised in February 1898 under Reverend D.E. Jones. Despite being co-ed, a majority of the students were male. In 1899, Reverend Edward Rowlands, who had experience as a teacher took over the work of the school. Parents originally did not see the need for education and this stifled participation in the school despite enthusiasm by children. Justifications were provided that labour was needed for jhum cultivation as opposed to being absent for school days.

Children would come to school with their brethren, carrying them on their backs or carrying their siblings. Teaching consisted of reading and writing initially. The syllabus was expanded over time as the school progressed. The pupils mainly attended from nearby villages around Aizawl. For students who stayed in distant villages, John Shakespear arranged a hostel as a small house for them to stay to attend school. In 1902 the school opened two sections, a lower primary section up to Class 3 and an upper primary section up to Class 5. The missionaries and pupils would also work together to bring lessons to villages.

Mizo children were educated both at home and in their zawlbuk and often relayed their knowledge to others. One service on Sunday was devoted to Sunday School for adults to learn to read and write. Alphabetic charts were freely distributed and Sunday school became popular. This would be changed into a Bible study hour as the service became the most popular one. Missionaries would utilize students and graduates of their classes as teachers into the villages to both educate and evangelize. Due to the unpopularity of the coolie system of forced labour, many individuals began to participate in schools operated by missionaries. As the goal was to establish mass literacy rather than higher education, there was no high school established early on.

The government also opened schools as early as 1893 but they taught in a Hindi medium and mainly served the children of sepoys stationed in Demagiri, Aizawl and Lunglei. Superintendent Alexander Porteus made a proposal in 1896 to the government of Assam to establish a school for Mizo children. The request was approved and a government school for the Mizos were established on 21 August 1897. In 1903 the government decided to open give near schools every year up to a maximum of 20 schools. The government also encouraged missionaries to encourage the Mizos to take up education and take on roles in school inspection and management.

In 1903, nine missionary schools were opened in Mizoram in the villages. These villages were Khawrihnim, Phulpui, Zukbual, Lungtan, Biate, Khawreng, Maita and Hmunpui. The government and Christian missionaries worked together to raise the number of lower primary schools to 15 which enrolled a total of 400 students. On 25 June 1903, the first batch of Mizo students attended the lower primary exams. Out of 27 students, 19 succeeded. The exams had covered Handwriting & Dictation in the Lushai Language, Explanation of Mizo pioneer, Arithmetic and English. The exam was conducted by the British government. Despite only 27 individuals taking the exam, the 1901 census showed 2058 literate individuals in the Lushai Hills. 2005 of these individuals were male with only 53 females. Despite several Christian denominations being established in the Lushai Hills, until 1947, only the Presbyterian Mission and the Baptist Mission worked among the Mizos to advance education. The other denominations began to advance education after Indian independence. By the end of British rule, there were 259 Primary schools and 22 Middle English Schools across the whole district. There were only two English High Schools in the Lushai Hills during British rule established late in 1944 in Aizal and 1948 in Lunglei.

Both the government and missionaries also sent Mizo students outside the district to expand educational opportunities. Lalziki was a woman whose mother died at four months leading her father to give her up to the Baptist missionaries. She was educated by the missionaries until the age of twelve before being sent to Calcutta for a matriculation examination and going to Madras at the Woman's Christian College for B.A and Delhi for her master's degree at Union Christian College. She was the first woman in the Lushai Hills to obtain a master's degree with the credit of the missionaries' upbringing.

The government believed in basic education for the Mizos. They employed local people to run the administration and require the employees to have a basic qualification for the role of serving in the government. Superintendent John Shakespear proposed appointing Reverend E. Rowlands as Honorary Inspector of all the existing schools in Mizoram. The Chief Commissioner of Assam approved the proposal and appointed Rowlands for a term from 1903 to 1907. He frequented schools to advance policies and techniques for the growth of education. Missionaries would hold the role of honorary inspector until Indian independence. Savidge would go on to suggest the establish of permanent central schools with boarding houses which the superintendent agreed to. The government provided a grant of ₹10,000 to provide hostel and additional accommodation alongside a yearly expenditure of ₹8,720. Rowlands argued the policy was successful as the children were away from the influence of their parents.

John Shakespear also introduced scholarships in 1902 for students in lower primary schools as an incentive. The Government of Assam granted eight lower primary scholarships in March 1903 at a rate of ₹3 for two years to performing students. The government furthermore financially assisted the schools. The first grant was to existing mission schools in 1897-1898 of ₹333 and the following year of ₹902. The Chief Commissioner on a visit to Aizawl in February 1904 granted ₹2,030 to the Aizawl mission and ₹1,440 to the Lunglei mission. In 1905–1906, the government transferred government schools to the responsibility of the missionaries and bore an expenditure of ₹2,460 for teacher salaries. The government continued to expand their grants to the schools of Mizoram over time.

In 1925 the Teacher's Training Department was established. It was led by a trained ceterficate teacher known as Mrs Hughes who was assisted by a foreign educated Mizo. The growth in education led to a clash between the missionaries and the government objectives. The missionaries refuted Mizo indigenous culture for the Christian converts while the government attempted to preserve customs such as the zawlbuk, zu and dances. In 1936 a curriculum was established in both the north and south subdivisions with a common examination in October 1936. McCall stated in Lushai Chrysalis that the curriculum was unsuited to the Mizos. This was because the curriculum up to the middle standard was influenced by Calcutta University's perception of a matriculation course, which McCall argued failed to meet the needs of a backwards people of a largely agrarian background. McCall believed education became a ticket for social mobility in government jobs rather than preserving local culture.

Education Milestones:

- First Lower Primary Examination in 1903
- First Mizo passed the Matriculation Examination in 1910.
- First Mizo obtained bachelor's degree in 1924.
- First Mizo (male) obtained master's degree in 1945.
- First Mizo female (Lalziki) obtained master's degree in 1952.

== Sources ==
- Chaltuahkhuma (1987). History of Mizoram. Aizawl: M.D.C and Sons.
- Liangkhaia (1938). Mizo Chanchin [Mizo History] (in Mizo). Aizawl: L.T.L. Publications.
- McCall, Anthony Gilchrist (1949). Lushai Chrysalis. London: Luzac.
- Malsawmdawngliana (2018). "Exploring the new world: The first world war experience". Historical Journal Mizoram. XIX (1): 179–188.
- Nunthara, C (1996). Mizoram: Society and Polity. New Delhi: Indus Publishing Company. ISBN 81-7387-059-4.
- Sangkima (2004). Essays on the History of the Mizos. Guwahati: Spectrum Publications. ISBN 81-87502-77-0.
- Samuelson, Ramchuani Sena (1985). Love Mizoram. Imphal: Goodwill Press.
- Vanlawma, R. (1969). Ka Ram Leh Kei (My Country and I) (in Mizo). Aizawl: Zalen Publishing House.
- Zorema, J. (2007). Indirect Rule in Mizoram: 1890-1954. New Delhi: Mittal Publications. ISBN 978-81-8324-229-5. OCLC 271837683. OL 48056042M.
- Nag, Chitta Ranjan (1998). Mizo polity and political modernisation: precolonial and colonial institutions. New Delhi: Vikas Publishing House.
- Lalrimawia (1995). Mizoram History and Cultural Identity (1890-1947). Guwahati: Spectrum Publications.
- Zatluanga (1966). Mizo Chanchin [Mizo History] (in Mizo). Aizawl: Zatluanga.
