= Mizo craft =

Craft work of Mizoram

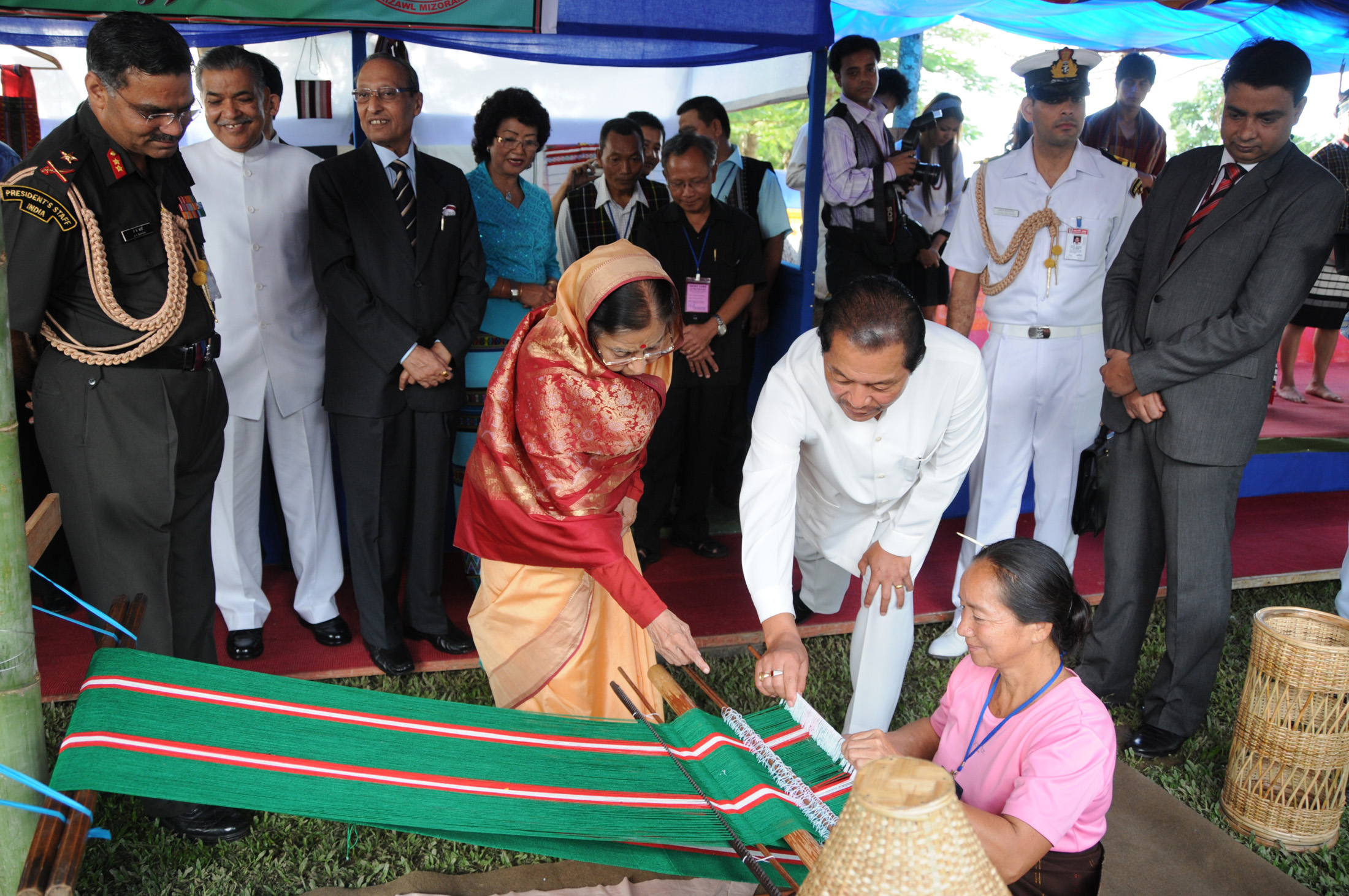
Handloom and handicraft exhibition at Aizawl, Mizoram on September 23, 2010

Mizo craft refers to as Mizoram handicrafts, is a traditional art and techniques of the inhabitants of Mizoram state, prominently known as the "Songbird of the North east". Its people are collectively known as Mizo. Mizo craftsmanship exists since ancient period. Its artisans use simple tools designed to produce traditional products. Handloom, cane and bamboo weaving are the core elements of its handicraft identity.

== Background ==
The traditional art of Mizo people creates several varieties of bamboo and cane products such as flower vase, baskets and utensils. Traditional furniture and hats using various craft material are among other craft products of the state. Mizo artisans, group or a single individual works independently to produce handmade items by using weaving methods. Artisans use raw material of bamboo to create traditional ornaments which is mostly used by Mizo women on special occasions such as marriage ceremony or festivals. Besides producing bamboo baskets, Indian economic census covered that Mizo artisans create cane stool, gourd crafts, and pottery across its districts and subdivisions.

== See also ==
- Mizo culture
- Mizo literature
- Darkhuang
