= Indian economic census =

Periodic Indian government survey

Indian economic census is the census of the Indian economy through counting all entrepreneurial units in the country which are involved in any economic activities of either agricultural or non-agricultural sector which engaged in production and/or distribution of goods and/or services not for the sole purpose of own consumption.

The economic census provides detailed information on operational and other characteristics such as number of establishments, number of persons employed, source of finance, type of ownership etc. These information used for micro level/ decentralized planning and to assess contribution of various sectors of the economy in the gross domestic product (GDP).

== Economic census ==
In 1976, the Government of India launched a plan scheme called Economic Census and Surveys. In 1977 Central Statistical Organization conducted First economic census in collaboration with the Directorate of Economics & Statistics (DES) in the States/Union Territories. The economic censuses of 1980 and 1990 were integrated with the house-listing operations of the population census. However, the data collected by the census organization were handed over to the state Directorates of economics and Statistics for processing and publication. All other economic censuses were conducted by the Directorates of Economics and Statistics of the states under the overall guidance of the Central Statistical Office.

Economic Census	Year
First Economic Census	1977
Second Economic Census	1980
Third Economic Census	1990
Fourth Economic Census	1998
Fifth Economic Census	2005
Sixth Economic Census	2013
Seventh Economic Census	2019
