= Satyen Barkataki =

Assamese civil servant (1908-1984)

Satyendra Nath Barkataki I.A.S S.C.S-E.R.
- Satyendra Nath Barkotoki

Superintendent of the Lushai Hills
- In office 1949–1953
- Preceded by: Leonard Lamb Peters
- Succeeded by: Himself (Deputy Commissioner)

Deputy Commissioner of Nagaland
- In office 1953–1953
- Succeeded by: S.J.D. Carvalho

Personal details
- Born: September 1, 1908 / 1915 Jorhat, Dibrugarh, Assam
- Died: 1984 (aged 75-76)
- Education: Jorhat Government High School
- Alma mater: University of London and Paris
- Occupation: Civil servant

Satyendra Nath Barkataki (1 September 1908 – 1984) was both the first Indian superintendent of the Lushai Hills district (now Mizoram) and the final one. Shortly after becoming superintendent his role would transition into a deputy commissioner. He was an Assamese civil servant who worked in multiple administrative roles from 1933 to 1968. He also authored books in both Assamese and English.

== Early life ==
Barkataki was born to Raisaheb Durgadhar Barkataki, a divisional inspector of Schools. His mother was Kalmini Devi. On his mother's side he claimed lineage to Anandaram Dhekial Phukan. He had a brother, Munin Barkataki, and was brother-in-law to Renuka Devi Barkataki.

Barkataki entered the Jorhat Government High School in 1917 and graduated in 1925. After matriculation he studied four years in the Presidential College Calcutta. He would pass BA with Honours in English in 1929. Barkataki was offered a scholarship to study abroad. However, due to his father's early retirement, bad financial investments and spending his savings to publish the Mahabharat in Assamese, the other expenses for studying abroad could not be fulfilled. This caused depression in Barkataki and nearly give up on his studies. He studied in Dacca University temporarily before leaving a month later and roaming north India for a full year. In 1930, Barkataki made a decision to study Law to become an advocate. Since the law course in Bombay was two years compared to three in Calcutta, Barkataki enrolled in Bombay. Barkataki studied for two years in the Government Law College, Bombay. He would also attend cases where Muhammad Ali Jinnah would work as a barrister. Barkataki would leave his education unfinished and enter the civil service in 1933.

== Civil Service ==
After graduation with an M.A and passing the LLB, Barkataki was required by the district magistrate to undergo government exmas in law, languages and accounts. Barkataki did not study for the government exams until three weeks before the examination. However the reading material challenged Barkataki. In response, a senior officer advised Barkataki to go on leave and leave the province to apply for an extension to the exam date. Barkataki followed the advice and retreated to Calcutta under the guise of a fever. However, returning after the examination period, the district magistrate did not believe Barkataki. Barkataki obtained third-class magisterial powers and was permitted to take on small cases. His first assignment was to Dibrugarh in June 1933. Barkataki would be promoted to second class magistrate after a case was wrongly referred to him but handled.

In the second year of his career, Barkatki was trained in survey and land settlement along with other officers and two from the ICS. In 1934 he was transferred to Golaghat. Barkataki and the officers would live in tents for up to two months during this course. During the course Barkataki records how the students would politely giggle to acquiesce the principal lecturer. Barkataki would enter good relations after making faces behind the principal making the learners disperse to their tents. He convinced the principal of his humour which on good standing afforded him good marks despite low effort. After the course Barkataki would be posted as magistrate of a sub-divisional town. Soon, he would be transferred back under the district magistrate and assigned to the headquarters of a large district. After having an argument with a government worker disputing his office work, Barkataki's confirmation as magistrate and first class powers was placed under reconsideration. Barkataki negotiated and managed to maintain his confirmation after the matter cooled down. In 1935 Barkataki would serve in Sylhet followed by Maulvi Bazaar in 1936.

After another sub-divisional assignment, Barkataki undertook a 15-month leave to Europe. He visited Marseilles, France before going to London. His intention was to join the Bar but due to financial and timing issues this was unable to be achieved. Baraktaki instead completed a course in Phonetics in London University under Daniel Jones (phonetician). He would move to Paris which was cheaper than London. He enrolled at Sorbonne University and attained a doctorate. Baraktaki learnt French and explored Europe during this time. On return, Barkataki would be posted to a large subdivision. The subdivision had some of the highest crime rates at the time, which he faced as a magistrate. In 1938 Barkataki was posted to Sylhet district but specifically Habiganj.

From 1939 to 1942, Barkataki worked in the Garo Hills. He was assigned to the Burma border in 1942–1945 at Barpeta. In 1945–1946, he worked as Tezpur. In 1946 he worked as under secretary in Shillong.

== Lushai Hills Superintendent ==
Barkataki was transferred to the Lushai Hills district as the first Indian superintendent. Barkataki describes the animosity of the Lushais against the hill peoples and attributed this to the missionaries and uninterrupted British rule. Barkataki managed the civil disobedience movement that had removed Leonard Lamb Peters. He also found that being the first Indian superintendent led to issues in trust from the Mizos, who did not readily work with people from the plains.

In January 1949, Barkataki attended and presented a speech to the assembly of Mizos. Barkataki explained the issues of independence for India and the formation of a new constitution. He justified to the Mizos in their demands for representation that their district council will be granted to them for representation. Barkataki further outlined that government plans for reforms in the Lushai Hills district were stalled particularly due to the civil disobedience movement that removed L.L. Peters. The agitation of the Mizo Union and their animosity towards the institution of chieftainship prompted Barkataki to explain that normalisation of relations and cooperation with chiefs were a prerequisite for administrative evolution for the Lushai Hills district. Furthermore, Barkataki distanced himself from the superintendents of the British era, where chiefs were empowered to the detriment of commoners. Plans were announced for the beginning of the construction of schools and roads, which was outlined as a priority for human development. Issues were raised in his speech about the refusal of the Lushai to build their schoolhouses. This was in part due to political polarization. A story was raised about an old woman who refused shelter in villages due to not being affiliated with the Mizo Union. The issue of the coolie quota was also raised. Barkataki announced the reduction in the quota with a Porter Corps and an increase in wages. The fines during the civil disobedience towards L.L. Peters was also announced to be refunded. However the guns seized were withheld.

The southern Lushai Hills were more closely integrated with eastern Bengal and the Arakan Hills rather than Assam and the North Lushai Hills. The main trade route was from Chittagong, which was historically in Lunglei. After partition the routes were essentially closed in the southern Lushai Hills and economically declining the region. The economy of the southern Lushai Hills relied on coolies and government assistance. The road project began on Republic Day 1950. Barkataki worked towards a road construction project on a self-help basis. The project was featured in news article but Barkataki accredited the Assam Rilfes Colonel, the Political Assistant and Engineer. The volunteers for the project came out to work outside of the harvest and busy jhumming periods. The road was 128 miles which linked Aizawl and Lunglei. The road was built with voluntary labour from the Mizos who built 90 miles of the road themselves. The slogan "see it through to Lungleh" was used throughout the project. The project was completed with an estimated equivalent of 1 crore worth of work. The first shovelling was ceremoniously performed by Reverend E.L. Mendus of the Welsh Mission in Aizawl. The road was designed for jeep traffic. A majority of volunteers were from the Assam Rifles Lushai Hills battalion. The home minister of India, Dr. Kailash Nath Katju, took a tour of the Lushai Hills and declared the project the ideal of India. The Lushai Hills had not seen a wheeled vehicle until World War Two and had only once route from Cachar. In an interview, Barkataki learnt the Mizo customs and discovered the impromotu roads to be near to the village jhums with churches, schools and clubhouses throughout the district. Barkataki realized the community centres of the Lushai Hills synergized with the cultural value of Tlawmgaihna. This led to the creation of the road project throughout the district.

In another event, a minister visited the Lushai Hills district. Barkatati arranged the minister to meet with a chief who arranged zu as a beverage. However, the minister refused and commented, "I never touch such things". Barkataki encouraged the minister to drink out of respect, but the minister made a scene in defiance. As a result, Barkataki poured himself a glass of zu and the secretary accompanying the minister while arranging tea for the minister instead. After sniffing the zu, the minister asked how much alcohol would induce drunkenness. In response Barkataki explained that the zu is treated like water with little effect. As a result, the minister did consume an amount of zu.

After the Mizo Union came to power in the district council several laws were passed to repeal chieftainship. Barkataki described the Mizo Union as a strong leftist party who viewed chiefs as reactionary institutions blocking progress. Bishnuram Medhi, who supported chieftainship, attempted to preserve it but failed. Barkataki exclaimed that the four years in Mizoram was the happiest years in his service life. He admired the qualities of cheerfulness, humour, hospitality, courage and truthfulness among the Mizos which he found had lacked in other era of his career. He appraised Tlawmgaihna as a respectable civic sense.

== Naga Hills ==
The increase in demand for Naga independence led to Barkataki being reassigned to the Naga Hills district. Within a few months, Zapu Phizo and his supporters termed Barkataki as the Plains Tiger of Assam. At the time the Naga Hills was in a state of turmoil. Barkataki did not see the issue as a political one but one of law and order. Barkataki was of the opinion that Phizo and the Naga National Council had a serious belief in independence but a majority of its members were careerists and opportunists who would terrorize and tax the villages.

However, Barkataki's career in the Naga Hills did not last long. He was transferred to the capital as Director of Supply before the year ended.

== Later career ==
After becoming Directory of Supply, Baraktaki was appointed Secretary to the Government in the Education and Medical Departments. In 1955 he received an offer from the Government of India to join the International Commission for Supervision and Control in Vietnam as Political Adviser to the Indian Delegation to the commission. This would be a diplomatic role as opposed to an administrative role in his career. Barkataki stated that the work in this role did not suit his temperament. He worked for 8 months in Hanoi, Vietnam before being transferred to Vientiane in Laos as Conference Secretary to the International Commission. He was later appointed Deputy Secretary General for another year.

After the commission in Laos was finished in 1958, he was appointed administrators in Mahe in Pondocherry which was de-jure French India. During this role the workload was intensely light and afford a lot of time for Baraktaki to indulge into writing and publishing. After Mahe, Baraktaki became Secretary to the Government of Ponidcherry. However, in 1961 Baraktaki was recalled to Assam as the Hills Division Commissioner. This role was also light in work allowing Barktaki to publish books in the hill tribes of the northeast Indian regions. He maintained the role for four years. Barkataki during this tenure also oversaw the humanitarian crisis of the Chakma refugees crossing into the Mizo district and the Garo Hills. During his tenure, Barkataki in a report submitted in 1963 discusses regional tensions in Assam. He classified the issues under three categories: Hindu-Muslim, Assamese-Bengali and Hills-Plains. He argued the Assamese Bengali issue to be a historical issue perpetuated by the British administrations. The Hills-Plains issue was seen as a consequence of the sixth schedule which differentiated the northeast from the Indian Union. Issues such as the Assamese Language Crisis, the Hill State demands aggravated tensions. Baraktaki mentioned in the report that the Mizo National Front at the time was not a force worth taking seriously as they did poorly in the general elections. The lack of infrastructure and connections with the wider Indian community was also a cause for concern as they isolated the northeast and cut off communication. Barkataki advocated improvement in education and building of schools to integrate the hill tribes academically. Baraktaki was against involving the military in the northeast as he argued that most issues are a law and order issue. He advocated for military withdrawal from the hill states instead. The Hindu Muslim issue was seen as a communal issue that could intensify into a regional one. East Pakistani refugees however continued to enter Assam during the era and this became a cause of concern for the Assamese.

In April 1965, Barkataki was appointed Chairman of the Assam Public Service Commission, which he served until retirement. Barkataki retired from the IAS in September 1968.

== Later life ==
Barkataki began a multi-purpose farm specialising in pigs, poultry, fishery and cattle. However the project failed with serious financial loss. After closing the farm Barkataki committed to becoming a full time writer. In 1983 he would undergo a critical surgery. He would die in 1984 shortly after.

== Publications ==
- Escapades of a Magistrate (1961)
- Fool Bibi (1961)
- Post Magisterial
- Assam (1969)
- Tribes of Assam (1969)
- Tribal Folk-tales of Assam-hills (1970)
- The Life of Napoleon (1977)
- Adolf Hitler
- The Khasis (1977)

== Sources ==
- Brahmaputra Beckons Publication Committee (1982). The Brahmaputra Beckons. Assam: Brahmaputra Beckons Publication Committee.
- Barkataki, Satyen (1961). Escapades of a Magistrate. Bombay: Orient Longmans.
- Barkataki, Satyen (1969). Assam. Assam: National Book Trust.
- Government of India (1966). History Of Services Of Indian Administrative Service (1966). Delhi: Manager of Publications Delhi. p. 73.
- Singh, K. (1995). The Scheduled Castes. Oxford University Press.
