= Kelkang Revival =

1937 Christian Revival in Mizoram

The Kelkang Revival also known as the Mizo Revival of 1937 was a Christian Revivalism movement in the Lushai Hills (Mizoram) among the Mizo people. The revival became infamous and Superintendent Anthony Gilchrist McCall intervened to curb its influence.

== Background ==
Kelkang was established in 1932 after several clans and tribal chiefdoms were merged by the British. The first Christian woman in Kelkang, Vari, converted her husband Khara into Christianity. Kelkang became the largest Zahau chiefdom on the west of the Tiau River with a few hundred Christians.

== Revival ==
The topic of the Kelkang Revival has not been systematically analysed, and thus there are differing views and confusion on the course of events in the revival. A.G. McCall's report on the movement is stated to have a negative bias, whilst authors such as Chhawntluanga tend to be defensive. McCall argues that the Kelkang Incident shows the administration of the Lushai Hills needed to hold missions accountable for their teachings and actions.

Thanghnuaia, a preacher, was a Ralte man of 36 years old who visited Kelkang for family matters. He was meant to collect the bride price of his sister, but the mithun died before he could take it. Thangnghuaia began to speak in tongues. The term vanzai (transl. heavenly singing) or vantawng (transl. heavenly talk) was used for Thanghnuaia. Thanghnuaia, who was illiterate, would get individuals to read out a verse pointed to, claiming the Holy Spirit had selected it as the verse of the day.

Thanghnuaia started to make performance while staying at an upas house in Kelkang. More and more people began to witness Thanghnuaia's actions and he continued to preach about focussing on family worship, constant prayer, humility and holiness in life. His ministry increased Church attendance and solved disagreements in the village. Thanghnuaia shared his influence with three other men, Thanzinga and Pasina according to Chief Liannawla who claimed that these three men had been converting Christians into a majority. The Church was awakened anew according to Liannawla. As Thangnhnuaia was an illiterate, Pasina a popular school teacher and Church Committee member presided over the meetings and handled discussions on the Bible. McCall states that the three men succeeded in wielding considerable spiritual influence over the people. When Thanghnuaia pointed out verses people would follow them. Such as if a verse mentioned sacrifice, individuals would begin to sacrifice their animals. Another passage stated the raining of manna in the skies which made Kelkang inhabitants stop cultivating food as they believed rice would rain from the skies and the world was ending. Children stopped attending school and the movement according to McCall went out of control of the Church leaders and missionaries.

In June, Thanzinga claimed a holy vision. He had laid on his back near the master bed with his mouth open and shook his head before stating that all people should gather and ready themselves for God's blessing. The message spread and the people of Kelkang swarmed Thanzinga's house. The revivalists began to sing and dance and individuals stopped working on their jhum cultivation plots to participate. Due to the crowd, Thanzinga was moved to upa Taibawnga's house. Thanzinga's brother, Lianbawnga took the position of crucifixion and screamed in the lively gathering. By July, many people had abandoned jhumming to hold regular sacrifices of animals for God. Between 24 July-10 September 1937, 13 pigs, 5 oxen, 3 mithun and three goats were killed to feed the ceremony.

McCall describes the revival as inhibiting the spirit of the Holy Ghost in their hearts. Song and prayers would be introduced with individuals answering the call to stand up in the Chapel and making words for the congregation. McCall stated that the gaiety of the performances of dance would end in hysteria and described a woman who stood naked in Church after going insane. He noted while the missions didn't license the action they failed to discipline such breaches of worship etiquette during the revival. Vanlalchhuanawma lists the revivalists believing in clairvoyance to discern the spiritual nature of individuals. The Christians at Champhia afraid of the Kelkang revival demarcated a vague spiritual boundary to protect themselves known as thlarau daitheu. The dances were unique to other revivals with one legged hopping, push and pull dancing with shouldering and pulling. Tai Nei Lam was a sneering dance at non-revivalists who didn't participate fully or spiritually.

Most predictions were made by Pasena. A few did come true, such as the arrests of the ringleaders and the fining of the chief. The raining of rice was fulfilled in 1959 during the mautam famine when the Assam Government air dropped rice. The prophecies of the Kelkang Revival were as follows:

- God is going to supply clean rice by making it rain down on Mizoram
- The site for the Church was surveyed and measured
- Three individuals will be arrested
- The Mizos will taste of Burma's prosperity
- The British shall be defeated
- Revival shall remain in Mizoram
- The Chief shall be fined ₹60
- The village grouping will happen
- False accusations
- Kelkang will become a city of the Spirit and its deliverance
- The day of Gentiles will be ended and the armageddon war is near, the allied powers of Italy and nine other nations will defeat Britain
- There will be an earthquake when prisoners from Sylhet will be released

The pastor of Kelkang, P.D. Sena met with Thanghnuaia and was annoyed at his method of interpretation pointing to verses. Sena shut the book and threw it at Thanghnuaia stating him that he was manipulating people. Thanghnuaia later in a statement issued that he requested Sena to teach him the correct way but that Sena had left him after declining. The Chief made an expulsion order three times but Thanghnuaia refused to leave. Thanghnuaia had left for other villages but always returned to stir up the revival once more.

The chief of Kelkang sent his upa Lianhranga to McCall, citing that the movement was to spread on a wide scale to neighbouring villages. McCall sent the young Mizomen to gather intelligence for two weeks and gathered reports. The reports outlined the vast number of conversions. McCall left with an escort of Gurkha riflemen of the First Battalion of the Assam Rifles on 4 September for Kelkang. McCall and the forces reached a camp 11 miles away from Kelkang. Once the ringleaders were made aware, they threatened that if McCall intervened, the Holy Spirit's words stated that he would be killed. When McCall was to arrive at Kelkang amidst the celebrations, the revivalists planned slap him on the face and jump on him to trample over him. McCall argued that this plane was concocted so no one person could be named a killer in his death. Pasina had forged the plan to perform a raid on the superintendent. He was the one to annoy him to make him say "damn" and signal the ambush. The plot to ambush McCall was provided by independent individuals outside the revival movement. On Pasina being questioned during the trial he denied it. McCall made a march unexpectedly and surprised the village with his visit. He surrounded the houses of Thanghnuaia, Thangzinga and Pasena and ordered two guards not to allow the chapel to be used as a stronghold by restricting entry into it. The ringleader was absent, having been told he was praying in the wilderness, before a search party was sent and had them arrested.

The ringleader, unnamed by McCall (Pasina according to Vanlalchhuanawma), was taken with him to the camp and described as continuing to speak in tongues with dazed, unseeing eyes. He was told by McCall that he could either persist in his nature of worship without food or that he behave normally and his family would be permitted to visit and feed him. McCall held a trial and brought forward many witnesses for ten days. Allegations against Thanghnuaia included disruption of jhumming as people had stopped cultivating food after announcing the end of the world to occur on 13 January 1938. The accused were also stated to have used threats and harassment of individuals who did not surrender their animals for the feasts and sacrifices. McCall also charged them with false witness or prophecy. Young men were defamed for sexual relations without proof. The revivalists were further charged with challenging the authorities. Pasina had invoked the spirit to not fear the chief, superintendent, mission etc. Vanlalchhuanawma argues this issue sparked McCall's intervention. The ringleader chose to abandon the method of worship and declared it to his followers rather than going to jail. The mission transferred the pastor to another area, and the Chief was punished for the disorder of the revival. McCall sentenced the three men, Thanghnuaia, Pasina and Thangzinga to three years in Sylhet. The Governor of Assam awarded clemency on the condition they refrain from public worship and preaching of religion for one year after the imprisonment was complete. All other villagers of Kelkang were made to pay heavy fines and dues with manual labour or money. The guns were confiscated by the administration, the house tax was doubled and the coolie quota was raised to six days unpaid labour. The drums of the church were seized and kept in the C.I's officers at Champhai. The people used a bison's horn instead as a substitute.

Another incident saw a chief report to McCall that a Church elder, Liana, was going with a married woman, Chawmi, on an evangelism tour. However, Liana's wife at home was seriously ill and they refused to postpone or cancel the trip. The chief accused them of adultery. McCall contacted the mission who stated the tour was not sanctioned. McCall gave an ultimatum to agree to stay in their village for one year or submit to jail. McCall also reports in his book an incident of a revivalist using a knife to attack a relative. When asked why, the man claimed that the revival excited him to the point of being lightheaded. McCall sent the man to prison for six months.

== Sources ==
- Vanlalchhuanawma (2007). Christianity and Subaltern Culture: Revival Movement as a Cultural Response to Westernisation in Mizoram. Delhi: Indian Society for Promoting Christian Knowledge. ISBN 978-81-7214-901-7.
- McCall, Anthony Gilchrist (1949). Lushai Chrysalis. London: Luzac.
