= Walter Lawrence Scott =

British colonial officer (1880–1951)

Sir Walter Lawrence Scott CIE

Superintendent of the Lushai Hills
- In office 1919–1921
- Preceded by: H.A.C. Colguhoun
- Succeeded by: S.N. Mackenzie

Superintendent of the Lushai Hills
- In office 1922–1923
- Preceded by: S.N. Mackenzie
- Succeeded by: S.N. Mackenzie

Personal details
- Born: August 7, 1880 Rangiora, New Zealand
- Died: January 20, 1951 (aged 70) Nelson, New Zealand
- Spouse: Beatrix Mary Scott (nee Nicholson) (m. 1910)
- Children: Elisabeth Scott; Margaret Agnes Scott
- Parent(s): John George Lawrence Scott (Father); Agnes Scott (Mother, b. Robinson)
- Education: Christ's College
- Alma mater: Canterbury University
- Occupation: Indian Civil Service
- Profession: Colonial officer
- Known for: Superintendent of the Lushai Hills

Sir Walter Lawrence Scott CIE (7 August 1880 – 20 January 1951) was an Indian Civil Service officer from New Zealand in the British Raj. Scott was assigned several positions, most notably as superintendent of the British Lushai Hills.

== Early life and education ==
Walter Lawrence Scott was born on 7 August 1880 in Rangiora to J. G. Lawrence Scott, the headmaster of East Christchurch School. He was the oldest of three children, with two younger brothers, Colin Edwin Scott and Frank Joseph Lawrence Scott. Scott attended his father's school, followed by Christ's College. Scott was awarded a junior university scholarship in 1897 and attended Canterbury College. He graduated in 1900 and achieved a senior scholarship with an exhibition in mathematics and experimental science. In 1902, Scott obtained M.A. with honours in mathematics, mathematical physics and chemistry alongside a Bachelor of Science degree in 1903. Scott participated in tennis, the Dialectic Society and the Students' Association.

== Career ==
Scott undertook the Indian Civil Service course at Trinity College, Cambridge and was posted to British Bengal in 1904. Scott was originally a magistrate for five years in a probationary term. In 1912, Scott became under-secretary to the government of Assam. Scott was assigned as superintendent of the Lushai Hills twice, between 1919 and 1921, and between 1922 and 1923.

As superintendent of the Lushai Hills, Scott is credited with defending the sovereignty of the district's territory against claims made by Hill Tipperah. He is also known for opening the Assam Rifles to Mizo volunteers to participate in.

He was later assigned as the director of land records in Assam from 1923 to 1924. Scott was further appointed as the commissioner of the Surma Valley division from 1934 to 1935. Scott received the Companion of the Order of the Indian Empire in 1929 and was knighted in 1939. Scott was a member of the Governor's Executive Council of Assam from 1935 to 1937. After the council was abolished and replaced with ministers, Scott was assigned to the Revenue Tribunal of Assam in 1937.

== Later life ==
Scott married Beatrix Mary Nicholson on 20 December 1910 at Christ Church Cathedral in Nelson. He had two daughters, Elisabeth and Margaret. Scott retired from the Indian Civil Service in April 1938. In World War II, Scott was assigned the temporary rank of Captain for the Nelson home guard. Scott died on 20 January 1951 in Nelson.

== Sources ==
- Samuelson, Ramchuani Sena (1985). Love Mizoram. Imphal: Goodwill Press.
- Hight, James; Candy, Alice (1927). A Short History of the Canterbury College (University of New Zealand) with a Registers of Graduates and Associates of the College. Auckland: Whitecombe and Tombs Limited.
- "Wedding". Nelson Evening Mail. Vol. XLV, no. XLV. 20 December 1910. p. 6.
- "Sir Walter L. Scott: Distinguished New Zealander". The Evening Post. Vol. CXXVII, no. 136. 1939.
- "Obituary:Sir Walter Scott". The Press. Vol. LXXXVIII, no. 26327. New Zealand Press Association. 23 January 1951.
- "Home Guard Captain: Sir Walter Lawrence Scott". Auckland Star. Vol. LXXII, no. 284. 1 December 1941.
- "Service in India: Sir Walter L. Scott former dominion resident a distinguished career visit on retiring leave". The New Zealand Herald. Vol. LXXVI, no. 23370. 12 June 1939.
- Scott, Gordon. "Walter Lawrence Scott". MyHeritage.
