= Alexander Porteous =

British colonial officer (1855-1932)

Alexander Porteous CIE

Political officer of the North Lushai Hills
- In office 1894–1897
- Preceded by: A.W. Davis
- Succeeded by: John Shakespear

Personal details
- Born: July 1, 1855 Kincardineshire
- Died: October 14, 1932 (aged 77) London
- Parent(s): Alexander Porteous of Lauriston (Father); Helen Porteus (Mother, b. Scott)
- Education: Harrow School
- Profession: Colonial officer
- Known for: Superintendent of the Lushai Hills

Alexander Porteous CIE (1 July 1855 - 14 October 1932) was a British colonial officer and administrator. Porteous spent his career administrating different districts of British Northeast India, such as Assam, Manipur, Sylhet, the Naga Hills and the Lushai Hills.

== Early life and education ==
Alexander Porteous was born on 1 July 1855 to his father of the same name, Alexander Porteous and Helen Porteous. He was the third oldest of six children. His brothers were David Scott, John James, Hercules Scott and William Walter. He had one sister, Mary Drummond. He was educated at the Harrow School.

== Career ==
Porteous entered the Bengal Civil Service in 1878. He served in Assam until being appointed Deputy Commissioner of the Naga Hills from 1887 to 1890. He was assigned Political agent of Manipur between 1892 and 1894. He served as political officer of the North Lushai Hills from 1894 to 1897.

Porteous presided over the final stages of the Lushai Rising with a punitive expedition at Chief Kairuma. Kairuma had refused to supply coolie labour and fines for refusing. The British columns occupied Kairuma's settlement without any resistance. They finally decided to burn it down and seize his livestock. After following it through, Kairuma surrendered and paid his fines. Porteous commented in the annual report that the Lushai chiefs were finally reconciled to the Government of the British Raj and Assam. Kairuma and another rebellious chief Lalbura both met with Porteous and cooperated without resistance.

Following the Lushai Hills, Porteous was reassigned to Manipur between 1897 and 1898. He was later Deputy Commissioner of Sylhet from 1899 to 1900. Until 1902, he was a judge and commissioner in the Assam Valley districts.

== Later life ==
Proteous retired in 1904. He had received the Companion of the Order of the Indian Empire in 1902. He moved to London, where he died on 14 October 1932.

== Sources ==
- McCall, Anthony Gilchrist (1949). Lushai Chrysalis. London: Luzac.
- Reid, Robert (1942). The Lushai Hills: culled from History of the frontier areas bordering on Assam from 1883-1941. Calcutta: Firma KLM.
- "Mr. Alexander Porteous". The Times. No. 46266. London: Times Newspaper Limited. 17 October 1932.
- "Alexander Porteous". MyHeritage.
