= N.E. Parry =

British colonial officer (1884–1939)

Nevill Edward Parry

Deputy Commissioner of Garo Hills
- In office 1920–1922
- Preceded by: F.E. Jackson
- Succeeded by: L.S. Bingemann

Superintendent of the Lushai Hills
- In office 1924–1928
- Preceded by: S.N. Mackenzie
- Succeeded by: Charles George Gordon Helme

Deputy Commissioner of the West Garo Hills
- In office 1929–1931
- Preceded by: Lt. G. Walker
- Succeeded by: S.L. Metha

Personal details
- Born: 1884 Buckinghamshire, UK
- Died: 14 March 1939 (aged 54–55) Ipplepen, Devon
- Spouse: Annie Dunnet Parry (m. 1920)
- Parent(s): Edward Hagarty Parry (Father); Amelia Marthe Parry (b. Piguet, Mother)
- Education: Trinity College, Cambridge
- Alma mater: University of Cambridge
- Occupation: Indian Civil Service
- Profession: Colonial officer

Nevill Edward Parry (1884-14 March 1939) was an Indian Civil Service Officer of the British Raj. He was the Deputy Commissioner of the Garo Hills and the Superintendent of the Lushai Hills. He was also the administrator who initially advocated for the Crown Colony of Eastern Agency Scheme.

== Early life ==
Nevill Edward Parry was born in 1884 as the oldest son of Edward Hagarty Parry and Amelie Martha Parry. He had five younger siblings consisting of two brothers and three sisters. His brothers were Henry Anthony Mervyn Parry and John Theodore Parry. His sisters were Theodora Ethel Hill, Adela Amy Vaudrey and Pauline Grace Cumming.

Parry was educated at Rugby School and left in 1902. Following this he attended the University of Cambridge under Trinity College. He graduated with a Bachelor of Arts in 1906.

== Career ==
Following the 1906 exams, Parry was appointed to the Indian Civil Service. In 1907, he served in Eastern Bengal and Assam as an assistant magistrate.

=== Lushai Hills ===
Parry upon becoming superintendent of the Lushai Hills developed ideas of strengthening the power and positions of the chiefs. Following his experience in the Khasi Hills, Parry initiated policies to prevent the decay of chiefly authority. Parry did this by attempting to revive the zawlbûk institution. The zawlbûks had begun to decline with the emergence of education and Christianity and a new progressive mindset. Christian parents stopped sending their children to the village zawlbûk on account that their homes and schools' education had surpassed the traditional methods. However, the decay of this institution meant a weakening of chiefs. Parry ordered that every village exceeding 25 houses was mandated to construct a zawlbûk. To avoid weakening the chiefs by dividing village, Parry stopped villages from splitting. During this period, the system of circle interpreters who coordinated chiefs within certain administrations were using government power to demand free goods such as eggs, goats and fowls. Parry ordered all officials on 13 November 1926 to pay the fair share for any goods received.

Parry's significant achievement is his Monograph on Lushai Customs and Ceremonies which he published in 1927. Due to the issue of litigation of Mizo customary law, Parry found great difficulty in assessing unbiased information. As a result, Parry standardised Mizo customary law in a publication known as the Mizo Hnam Dan (transl. Mizo People's Law). Parry compiled the customary legal code by interviewing and consulting chiefs of the Sailo clan primarily.

=== Crown Colony Scheme ===
Parry wrote a letter as part of a memorandum of to propose a hill division. His letter dated 3 March 1928 was made during his tenure as Superintendent of the Lushai Hills. In the letter, Parry argues that the hill people have no connection with Bengalis or Assamese. The Lushais are of Mongolian origin and share more affinity with the Kukis and Chins. The religion of the hill people is also primitive. Parry argued this, citing the case of Lushai animism and the lack of Islam and Hindu influences. The Lushais who were annexed by the British were now obligating the British to protect them from being exploited by advanced communities in the plains and place them as permanent disadvantages. In ascertaining the future responsibility of India to protect the hill people Parry describes it as a "unjustifiable slur on capacity and goodwill". The Lushai people were described as being highly educated but lacking abstract political ideas and unready for political advancement. Economic factors of the future were considered as it lacked industry, minerals and navigable terrain and a lack of roads.

Based on these factors, the letter proposes a council for backwards tracts in Northeast India. Parry proposed a hill division with a commissioner under the Governor of Assam, granting considerable autonomy in budget and finances. The Second option proposed was the North-Eastern Frontier Hill province to be formed of the backwards tracts consisting of Lushai Hills (Mizoram), Khasi and Jaintia Hills (Meghalaya), Sadiya Frontier Tract with Balipara Frontier Tract (Arunachal Pradesh), Mikir Hills, Pakoku and Western Burma.

== Later life ==
Parry returned to the United Kingdom, where in 1932 he joined the Devonshire Association. Parry died on 14 March in Ipplepen. He was succeeded by his wife Anna Dunnet Parry, whom he had married on 23 December 1920 in Calcutta.

== Sources ==
- "Annie Dunnett Sinclair-Smith & Nevill Edward Parry". My Heritage. INDIA-EASy.
- "Deaths". The Times. No. 48254. Times Newspaper Limited. 15 March 1939.
- Cullum, Thomas Gery (1907). The Cambridge University Calendar for the year 1907-1908. Cambridge: Deighton Bell and Co.
- Michell, Arthur Tompson; Perry, Ottley; Higginbotham, George (1904). Rugby School Register: From May 1874 to May 1904. Rugby: A.J. Lawrence printer.
- Sawmveli, V. (2017). "Mizo customary laws and discourse of women's rights". In Kakati, Binita; Dutta, Bitopi; Pereira, Melvil (eds.). Legal Pluralism and Indian Democracy Tribal Conflict Resolution Systems in Northeast India. New York: Taylor & Francis.
- Simon, John Allsebrook (1930). Memorandum submitted by the government of Assam. Government of India Central Publication Branch.
- Zorema, J. (2007). Indirect Rule in Mizoram: 1890-1954. New Delhi: Mittal Publications. ISBN 978-81-8324-229-5. OCLC 271837683. OL 48056042M.
- Devonshire Association for the Advancement of Science, Literature and Art (1940). Report and Transactions - The Devonshire Association for the Advancement of Science, Literature and Art. University of Michigan.
- Great Britain India Office (1910). The India Office List for 1910. London: Harrison and Sons.
