= Anthony Gilchrist McCall =

Indian Civil Service officer and military officer (1895-1978)

Major Anthony Gilchrist McCall OBE
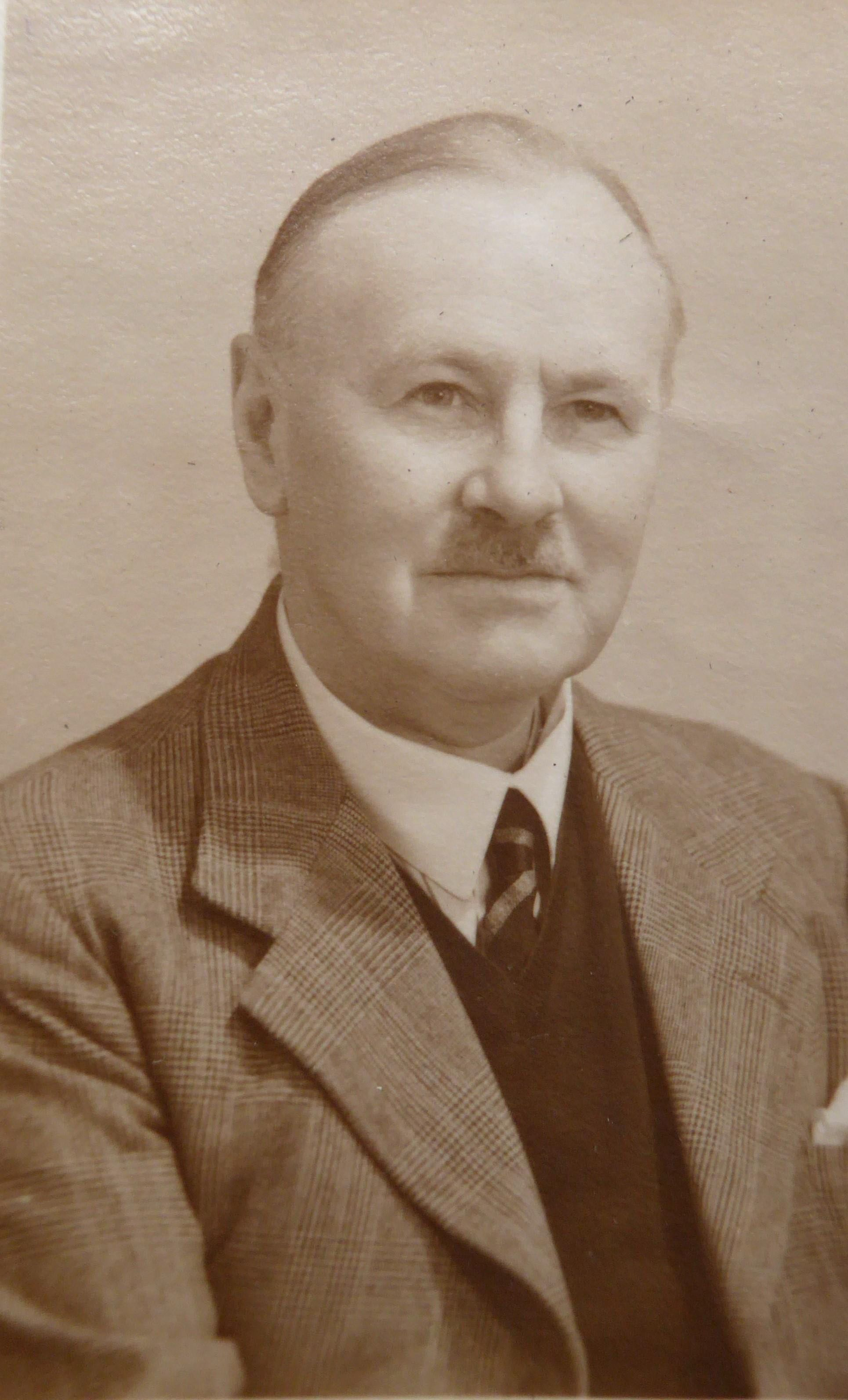
- Portrait of Anthony Gilchrist McCall (c. 1950s)

Superintendent of the Lushai Hills
- In office 1931 – May 1943
- Preceded by: G.G.G. Heime
- Succeeded by: Arthur Ronald Hume Macdonald

Personal details
- Born: January 7, 1895 Conisbrough, South Yorkshire, England
- Died: May 8, 1978 (aged 83) Sandbanks, Poole Unitary Authority, Dorset, England
- Spouse: Jean Chisholm McCall (m. 1924–1978);
- Children: Mary Elliot Scott
- Relatives: Dr Anthony McCall (Father); Mary Greer Gilchrist McCall (Mother); Elizabeth Marion Gilchrist McCall Gough (Sister)
- Military career
- Burial place: Bournemouth Crematorium and North Cemetery; U9/27
- Allegiance: United Kingdom
- Branch: British Army
- Service years: 1915-1931
- Rank: Major
- Unit: 54th Brigade Royal Field Artillery
- Known for: Superintendent of Lushai Hills District
- Conflicts: Balkans theatre, World War I
- Other work: Lushai Chrysalis

Major Anthony Gilchrist McCall OBE (7 January 1895-8 May 1978) was an Indian Civil Service officer and an officer of the British military. He was the superintendent of the Lushai Hills District from 1931 to 1943.

== Early life ==
Anthony McCall was born in Yorkshire on 7 January 1895 to Dr Anthony McCall and Mary Greer McCall (b. Gilchrist). He had one sister. He was educated at Cheltenham College before going to Woolwich to train as an officer in the Royal Artillery. He was commissioned in the early summer of 1914. McCall was on leave in Germany on the outbreak of World War I and escaped detention by German authorities. He served with the Royal Artillery and participated in the Balkans theatre, particularly on special duty in the Serbian campaign. His ranks include being a Lieutenant and a Captain Temporary Major. He ended his service with the rank of Major.

== Indian civil service ==
In 1921, McCall joined the Indian Civil Service as the only regular soldier in his year to be accepted. He was posted to Bengal where he received further training. He was then posted to the Government of Assam.

In 1928, McCall was appointed President of the Durbar in Manipur State. He held this position until 1931, when he was transferred as the Superintendent of the Lushai Hills District.

== Superintendent of the Lushai Hills district ==
The Lushai Hills was described as a pleasant backwater that was underdeveloped and underinvested by the Government of Assam. Little had been done to modernize the region. Due to the inner line and excluded areas designation, outside contacts were also limited. McCall took on a modernisation policy for the Lushai Hills to prepare them for their place as a wider community. McCall designated policies for the Lushai Hills while preserving Lushai customs and traditions. Efforts were made in education, health, hygiene, agriculture and social activities. Due to this, the Assam Government permitted McCall to remain as superintendent for a term far longer than average. McCall's efforts in the Lushai Hills were ambitious, as he even attempted to convince the British to establish electricity.

=== Response to the Kelkang Revival ===
As Superintendent McCall presided over the unfolding the Kelkang Revival. A Mizo preacher, Thanghnuaia who was illiterate began to get individuals to read out verses he pointed and claim communion with the Holy Spirit. Thanghnuaia's influence grew through his preaching and constant prayer. His influence became diluted over two more men known as Thanzinga and Pasina according to Chief Liannawla. Pasina who was literate presided over the meetings and handled biblical discussion. McCall claimed that the three men succeeded in wielding considerable spiritual influence over the people of Kelkang.

Thanzinga claimed to have had a holy vision, and the message spread across Kelkang. Revivalists began to sing and dance and stopped cultivating their crops. Individuals began to sacrifice animals in feasts for God as a result. McCall analyses the revival of individuals inhibiting the spirit of the Holy Ghost in their hearts. McCall recorded instances of hysteria such as a naked woman in Church during the revival celebrations who went insane. He criticised the missions for the failure to police the behaviour of revivalists and lack of worship etiquette.

Eventually the Kelkang Revival spread to neighbouring villages. McCall left with an escort of Gurkha riflemen of the First Battalion of the Assam Rifles on 4 September towards Kelkang. McCall uncovered a plan that the revivalists planned to ambush him by slapping him and trampling him. He claimed this plan was made so that no one killer would be identified in his attempted intervention. Pasina was alleged to have devised a plan to prompt McCall to say "damn" in order to trigger the ambush. McCall thus made a surprise visit to the village and surrounded the houses of the ringleaders and arrested the three men.

Pasina was taken to the camp and spoke in tongues. McCall gave an ultimatum to Pasina to persist in worship and not be fed, or revoke the behaviour and allow his family to feed him and visit him. He conducted an investigation and trial over a span of ten days. McCall stacked several allegations against the ringleaders. Thangngnuaia was accused of disrupting food cultivation after an end-of-the-world revelation was announced. McCall charged them with false witness and prophecy. The ringleaders also defamed sexual relations without proof. McCall further charged the revival movement with challenging authority. McCall sentenced the three men, Thanghnuaia, Pasina and Thangzinga to three years in Sylhet. The men were soon granted clemency on condition of refraining from public worship. McCall exacted heavy fines and increased impressed coolie labour to six days of unpaid labour.

=== McCall's reforms ===
==== Chief's Durbar ====
McCall established the chief's durbar in the Lushai Hills. Using the pre-established circle system, the chiefs of each circle would record votes under a secret ballot system to appoint a chief spokesperson for the circle. This position would be held for term of three years. An appointed chief would be required to sign a document to hand to the district officer or superintendent. The document would require allegiance to the British monarch and faithful duty to advance the standards for all lushais. The office would also place chiefs in charge of all grievances and subjects within the circle to encourage leadership cultivation and cooperation. The document further outlines an anti-corruption clause to not place material and personal ambitions by reaching an office as a circle chief. Chiefs would be required to learn all the principles of administration and accept necessary changes in traditional Lushai customs regarding chieftainship. Lastly, the document states that all chiefs in office are equal. McCall implemented this clause to prevent conflicts of clan precedence and history from justifying inequality and conflict. McCall's intention of the durbar policy was to encourage chiefs to become able administrators who could maintain foresight for the wellbeing of their people as opposed to their traditional privileges.

The Durbar would meet twice a year and last 7-10 days with the superintendent. Apart from policy negotiations, the superintendent would become responsible for teaching administrative policy on certain topics such as legal procedure, soil and forest conservation, agriculture, public works and politics. The functions of the durbar were established to consider changes to the Lushai District Cover, which codified customary Lushai laws. The durbar would also encourage chiefs to raise grievances on the implemented policies of the British government or other sources which are not indigenous. Overall the durbar would maintain the policy of indirect rule while simultaneously granting a machinery for fully examining and debating policies relating to the Lushai people.

However the durbar also led to failure. The chiefs at one point allocated funds to an agitator who wished to start a highschool and become educated into a headmaster for the future high school. However, he failed to gain a degree from Calcutta before becoming embroiled in a cotton deal scandal. In another durbar, the chiefs opposed supplying rice to schoolteachers on account of no high school being established despite the British funding over 200 schools.

October 1940 Chief's Durbar elections
Circle	name	clan	village
Aizawl subdivision
Circle I	Lalsailova	Sailo	Kelseih
Circle I	Kamlaiana	Sailo	Tachhip
Circle II	Khawkunga	Chenkual	Pukpui
Circle II	Ngurliana	Sailo	Kolasib
Circle III	Hrangtinaia	Hmar	Vaitin
Circle III	Laltinkhuma	Sailo	Lailak
Circle IV	Awksarala	Sailo	Phullen
Circle IV	Hrangchhuma	Sailo	Khawdungsei
Circle V	Thlahthiauva	Hualngo	Khuangleng
Circle V	Thanglianga	Sailo	Tlangsam
Circle VI	Thangchuanga	Sailo	Biate
Circle VII	Lalzuala	Sailo	Baktawng
Circle VIII	Saihnuna	Sailo	Mualcheng
Circle IX	Ngurchhina	Sailo	Thenzawl
Circle X	Lalbuanga	Sailo	Kanghmun
Circle XI	Lalluaia	Sailo	Reiek
Lunglei Subdivision
Circle XII	Laldula	Sailo	Buarpui
Circle XIII	Thanzama	Sailo	Thiltlang
Circle XIV	Sena	Sailo	Sekhum
Circle XIV	Taikhuma	Ralte	Pukpui
Circle XV	Khuahupa	Pawi	Cheural
Circle XV	Lalsailova	Fanai	Lungleng
Circle XVI	Achhuma	Fanai	Tawipui
Circle XVII	Chungmunga	Lakher	Serkawr
Circle XVIII	Lianhnuna	Palian	Tiante

==== Welfare Committee System ====
On account of only 3% of te population in permanent contact with amenities, the village welfare committees were inaugurated in response. The policy was established in the interest of the public health and living conditions of all villages. The final authority of the system was the civil surgeon of the Lushai Hills. The welfare committees were largely under the guidance of the Red Cross District Committee in Aizawl. It employed both Lushais and Europeans in this endeavour. Only unanimous decisions are enacted by the committee. This was to ensure that policies were not enforced without amending Lushai conditions or technical approval of the civil surgeon. Furthermore, the committee was bipartisan in religion, education, and politics, making it easy to implement.

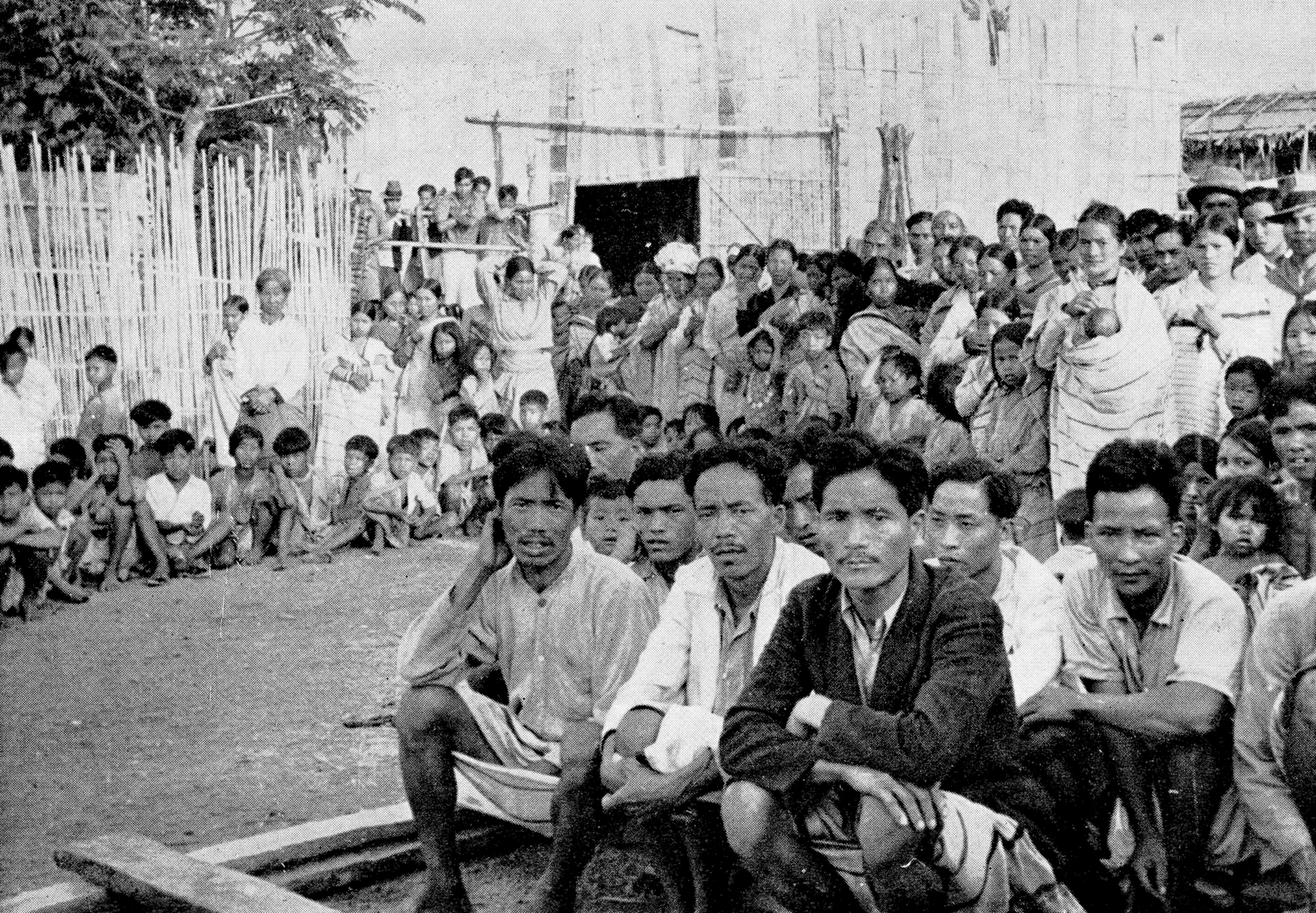
Lushai village welfare meeting.

Welfare committees were required to comply with district rules. The rules were that committees must be formed with the chief as president who will be assisted by heads of the village church and school along with pensioners and two ordinary men and women. This structure ensured unity and kept checks of power on all individuals among the Lushai hierarchy. The formation of a committee by a chief is not compulsory but must follow the rules if chosen. Upon advice or new health alerts from the headquarter committee of the chief surgeon, the chief will call the committee members to his house for local consultation and gain a unanimous acceptance to apply the new advice. Advice would range from hygiene, diet pamphlets, pregnancy etc. If the committee is not unanimous the matter is dropped until it can be brought up again favourably. Once the advice is accepted by consensus a meeting is held for the village. The villagers are called together once a month and the advice is read out with a short discussion. To limit long debates, villagers are told the advice beforehand and encouraged to bring up question during the monthly meeting. During the meeting a vote will be held in which a majority of villagers would have to support the advice to implement it as a custom. There is no penalty or enforcement of the new rule apart from public opinion.

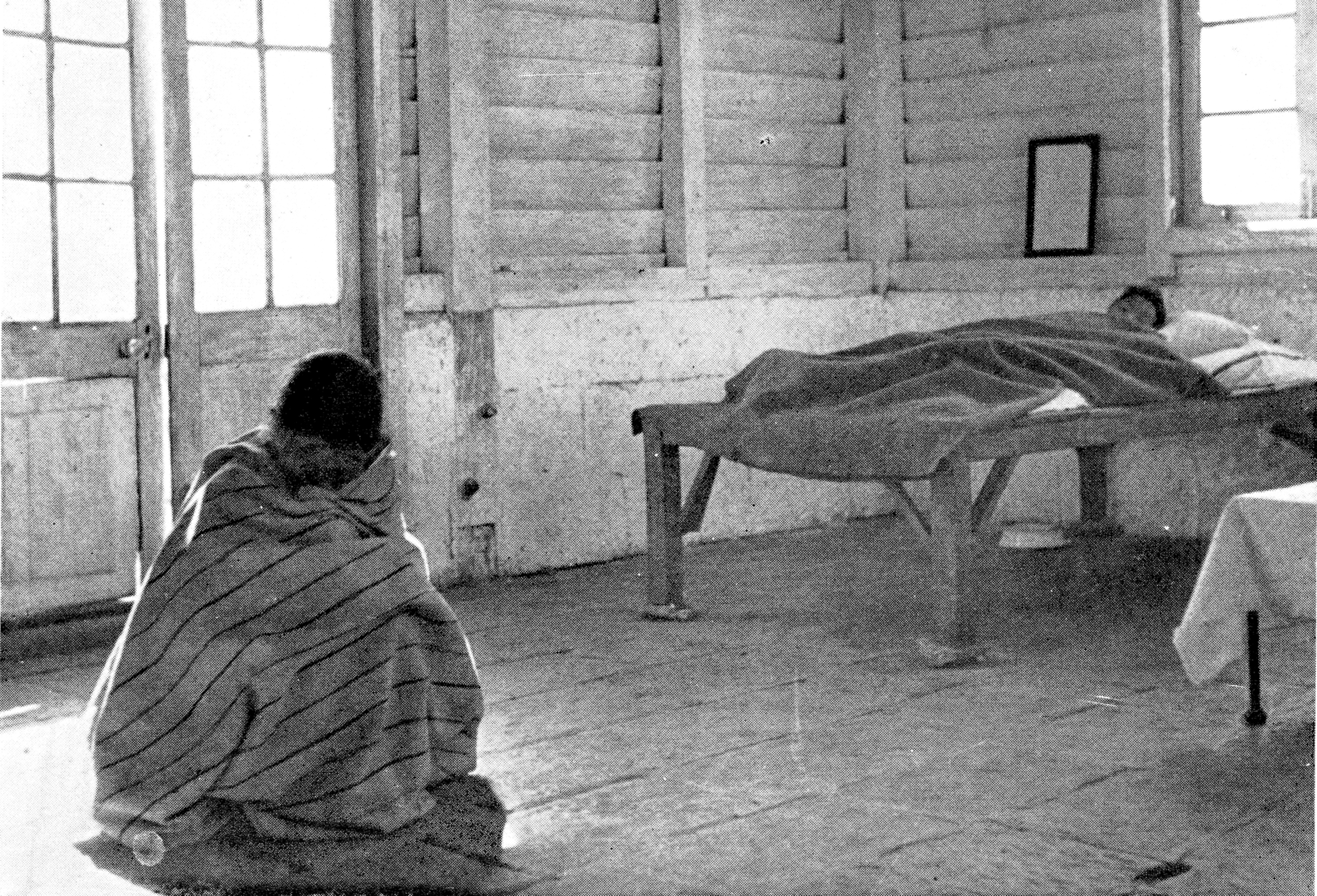
An early Lushai dispensary.

McCall established the village welfare committees to encourage choice-making among the Lushai people and take responsibility for their wellbeing. The policy was also cost-effective as there were no expenses apart from the printing fees of the pamphlets and advice. The pamphlets educated the Lushais on epidemics, Lushai cuisine and nutrition which were handed out free of cost.

==== Ten Point Code ====
Another reform under McCall was the ten point code. This was established as a policy of forming a national identity that would resist becoming absorbed into the spheres of Indian or Burmese domination. McCall states that "this will sow the seeds of a temperate nationhood". The ten point code would be learnt by children in school to the point of being recited beginning to end without fault. The code was translated into Lushai verses by the poet and Chief Saihnuna, a Fanai of the Leng village in the Eastern lushai Hills. It was largely used as a choir song and used for the village welfare meetings at the beginning and end. The code was developed with full consultation of the missionaries to ensure no disagreement was reached.

The code also considered John Shakespear's notes which listed the vices of the Lushais. The first is of a want of manly independence, in which there is a lack of effort to trouble themselves to their own improvement of best interest unless they are bestowed a favour. The second is described as a tendency to intrigue which should not be indulged. A third vice was listed as a tendency to rush orders or requests. The fourth vice is a love of litigation. Without double jeopardy, the Lushais continue to bring up previous cases when a new administrator comes. Shakespear also terms laziness as a vice and advocates to maintain the impressment of labour as coolies. As a result of this insight, McCall formulated the code to encourage the Lushais to remedy the vices. McCall argues that cures by order and edict have a lasting effect while dictatorial action is better reserved for emergencies.

1. We desire to maintain a wholesome respect for all that is best in our indigenous culture, which bears the stamp of the hardly learned experience of our brave forefathers, over time immemorial.
2. We desire to inspire in our people an ambition to maintain a true sense of proportion as to what wants and desires are reasonable in relation to our own natural resources and industry.
3. We desire to maintain strict loyalty to our chief in all things lawful, and in all his efforts on behalf of the welfare of his people, in return for which the Chief will serve the interests of his people so that he may continue to rule.
4. We desire to inculcate into one and all that we should display the same sense of loyalty to our whole village community as we desire to practise towards our own families.
5. We desire to do all in our power to foster the indigenous spirit of Tlâwmngaihna in our midst.
6. We desire to integrate into our daily village lives, within the indigenous framework of our social system what modern science and knowledge have discovered, by strengthening and safeguarding our characters and health, home, crops, industry and possessions.
7. We desire to seek all useful channels for the greater use of our leisure time so that by our industry we may bring advantages to our families and to our villages as a whole, making increasingly sincere efforts to arrange our lives that we may relieve our womenfolk of some of the harder work, that we may spare them in the hope and belief that they will, in their turn, take increased trouble to rear finer children, and make better food, clothes and happier and more united homes.
8. We desire to unite all in contesting our common tendency to be 'Mi hlem hle' while retaining our pride in the sinere achievement of all manly and courageous feats, especially those undertaken for the protection of our community, as well as in the industrious successes of our wives and families in their homes and in their schools.
9. Those of us who are Christians agree to recognise that we should bow to the authority of those who introduced us to Christianity, and that we shall be disloyal to them if we do not submit to the discipline, which it is their prerogative to demand.
10. We desire to inculcate into all our community the need for self-control and the avoidance of all excesses — a fault to which so many of us are subject, and in all the achievement of this self-control, we desire further to inculcate a true spirit of willing service and discipline into the young men, who are the nation of the future, recognising that without such proper and temperate discipline we cannot hope to be of any use to our clans, our families, or to any employers, or even to the faith which we may profess.

==== Lushai Hills Cotton Industries ====
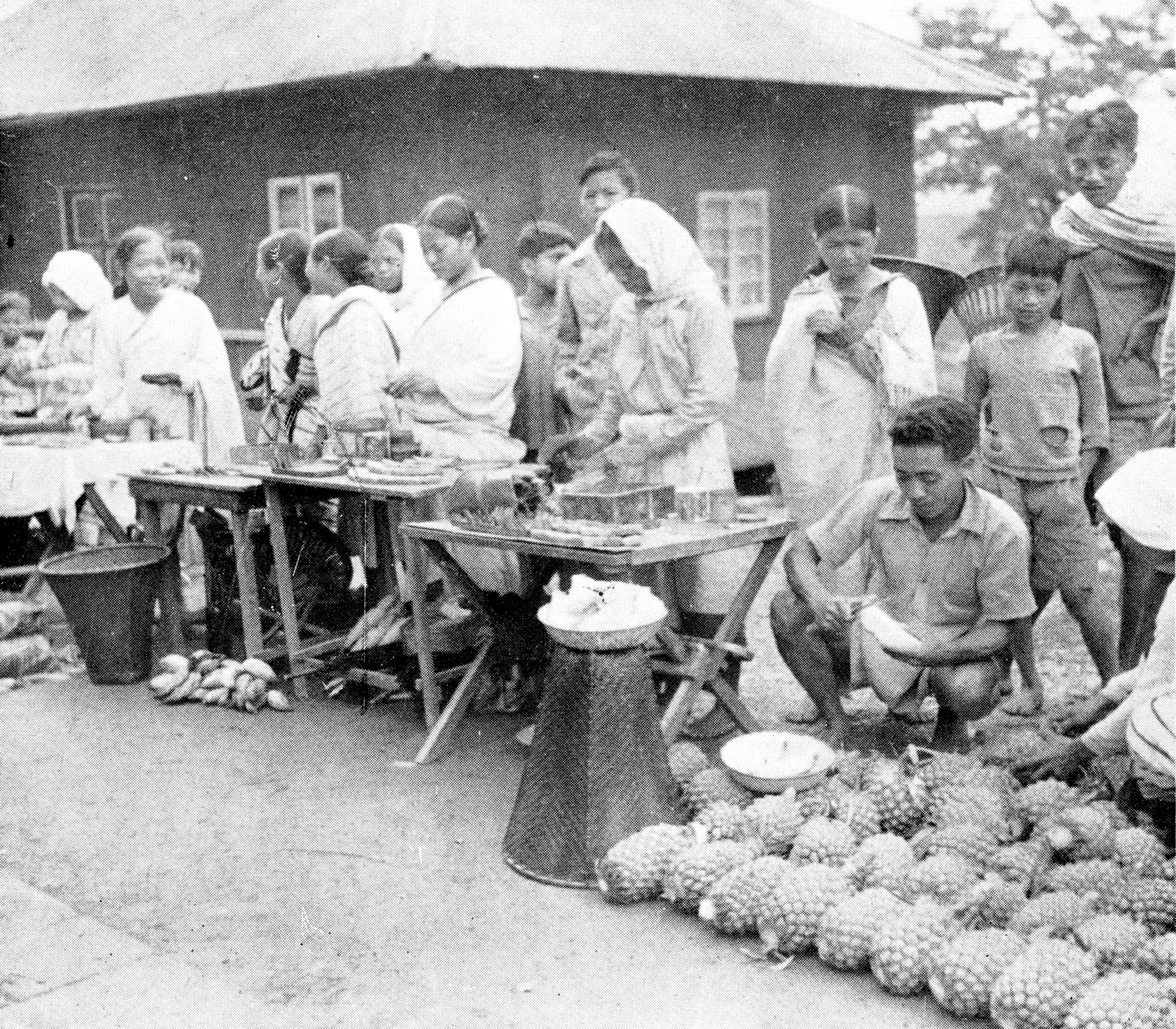
A Cotton bazaar situated in Aizawl for the Lushai Cotton Industries.

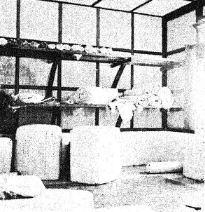
White rugs produced from the Lushai Cotton Industries Program.

McCall and his wife recognised that the Lushais possessed significant talent in cotton weaving on hand looms, which had traditionally been used in pre-colonial times. After McCall's term was extended as superintendent, he endeavoured to open up the Lushai Hills to the markets of the plains. This was done with consideration for granting economic capacity for the Lushai people in the situation of self rule or strife in harvest failure. McCall privately financed the venture and established the Lushai Hills Cotton Industries. The organisation was privately funded as the possibility of failure of the endeavour after central government funding would negatively reflect on McCall's administratorship. Another reason for the expansion of the cotton industry was to curb the influence of Christian revivalism that the Welsh mission had caused. Jean McCall took on a full time position to managing the operation and organisation. She would aid them in understanding and educating the Lushais on cotton enterprise.

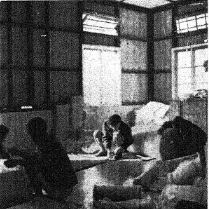
Lushai workers in the Reid House storage building.

The first article built under the Lushai Hills Cotton Industry was a rug of rough unspun white tufted locally grown cotton. They were accepted as production and sent off as samples. However the first consignment as the market was not up to standard in a wire to McCall and refused to accept more. This was demoralising especially for many individuals who were looming during the leisure months of March. Notices were sent out to all workers that only rugs up to a certain date could be accepted as an only batch. Each rug was stored on the veranda of McCall's residence. They were measured, checked for standard and paid for. Experiments were put on different lines. As a result, one of the lines led to success. The product was accepted for delivery to the markets in Calcutta. As a result, volunteers from the villages were called to learn the preparation of cotton and its method of introduction into the warp. Afterwards, the volunteers spread their skills by teaching others in their villages who were eager. Each rug completed to standard were paid for at a standard rate. Only 20% of rugs were marketable however. As a result, a lowered market price was introduced to low quality rugs unless a high quality rug were to replace it in which the price for both would be compensated. To transport the rugs, R.G. Baker of the Imperial Tobacco Company of India offered assistance. Over time, the quality of rugs improved along with the marketability rate of rugs. Demand increased as coloured rugs were requested.

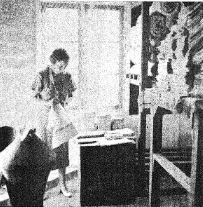
Mrs McCall organizing the Lushai Hills Cotton Industries Program.

The Lushais were sent to Calcutta and trained in dyes under the Havero Trading Company General Manager, Dr. Boege. The Lushais learnt how to make synthetic dyes. However, the increase in production led to Robert Niel Reid to patronise the venture. The Reid House was constructed to house the stock of rugs and other capital in cotton production. The patron of Robert Reid supplied dyes free of cost to the Lushais, who previously could not produce them on a mass scale.

=== World War Two ===
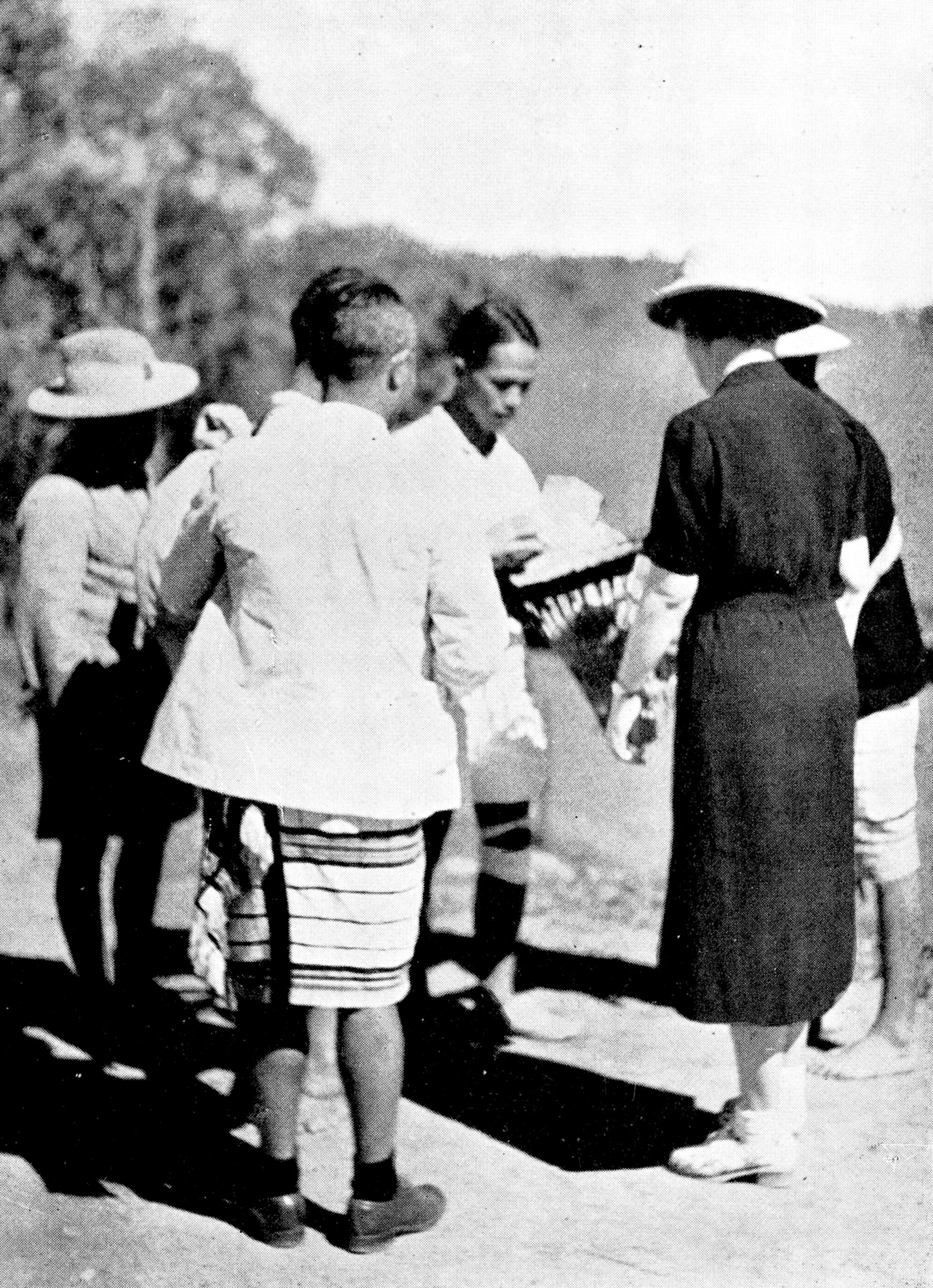
Jean McCall giving gifts to Lushai recruits in World War II.

In 1942 at the Japanese occupation of Burma, McCall gathered all the Lushai chiefs and asked them to join a voluntary bond to the British crown and sign a promise to join the Total Defense Scheme for the Lushai Hills. After successful negotiations with the chiefs and their upas, the 300 delegates linked arms around the flag pole with McCall, his wife and two civil officers and sung "God save the King" before the Union Jack. McCall furthermore made a speech at the chiefs durbar which would show support for the future crown colony scheme of the Chin-Lushais:

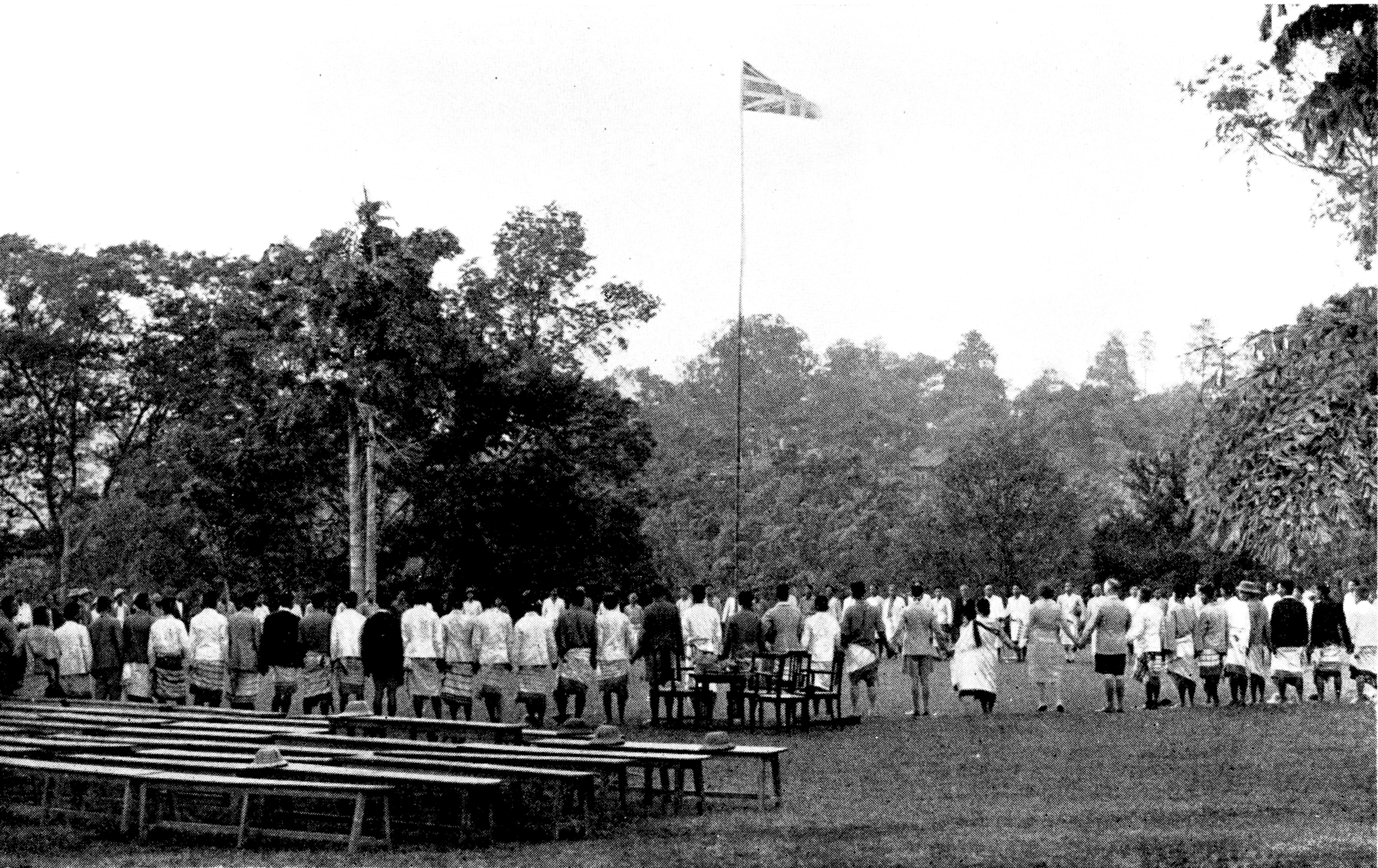
Lushai chiefs pledge allegiance to the Union Jack during World War II.

You will remember that in 1935 the British peoples enacted an Act which had for its purpose the inauguration of Dominion Status for India. The British peoples could have included the destiny of the Lushai straight away with that of the Indian peoples. But they did not. They made Lushai what is now known as an ‘Excluded Area’ and they retain the right to protect Lushai from subjection to any other majority control. Was that not an Act which gave proof that the British peoples’ wish was to protect Lushai land, and to ensure that the destiny of Lushai passes to no other hands without the consent of the Lushai peoples? . . . If Lushai land were handed over to India or to Burma what chance would we, who are Lushais, have of entering into the social and cultural framework of either power, at this late stage, bearing in mind the fact the geographically or culturally we never have been a part of either?’

The Superintendent, Lushai Hills, created certain avenues by which the Lushai peoples could prove themselves worthy. The Village Welfare Committee was a great encouragement to a much needed unity. It brought Christians and non-Christians nearer, lessened the gap between Chiefs and people, the Chiefs and the Church, the men and the women. The 10 point code created a means for unity in our senses of what was expected of any good Lushai citizen. The Lushai Hills Cottage Industries created the means by which the skill of the Lushai might spread far and wide and by which of skill handed down from our forefathers. Lushai themselves write from Cairo and from Quetta and from elsewhere, proud to see Lushai products being used by the Army institutions and others, while even now Lushai articles have been specially sent by the Government of India to Johannesburg, city of Gold, in Africa, as an example of our ancient and contemporary art.

Then in 1938 you, who keep in touch with world affairs, will remember the Munich Agreement of 1938, by which Mr. Chamberlain managed to put off war with Germany for one more precious year. The Superintendent, Lushai Hills, then intensified the above avenues to create our national strength and unity and intensified Circle Conferences among Chiefs, culminating in October 1941 in a full district Durbar of Circle Representative Chiefs from the North and the South Lushai Hills. Such a body is the initial personification of Lushai national life. It would be difficult to aspire to nationhood without such institutions as the above.

— Anthony G. McCall, McCall Papers, Administering Colonialism and War: The Political Life of Sir Andrew Clow of the Indian Civil Service

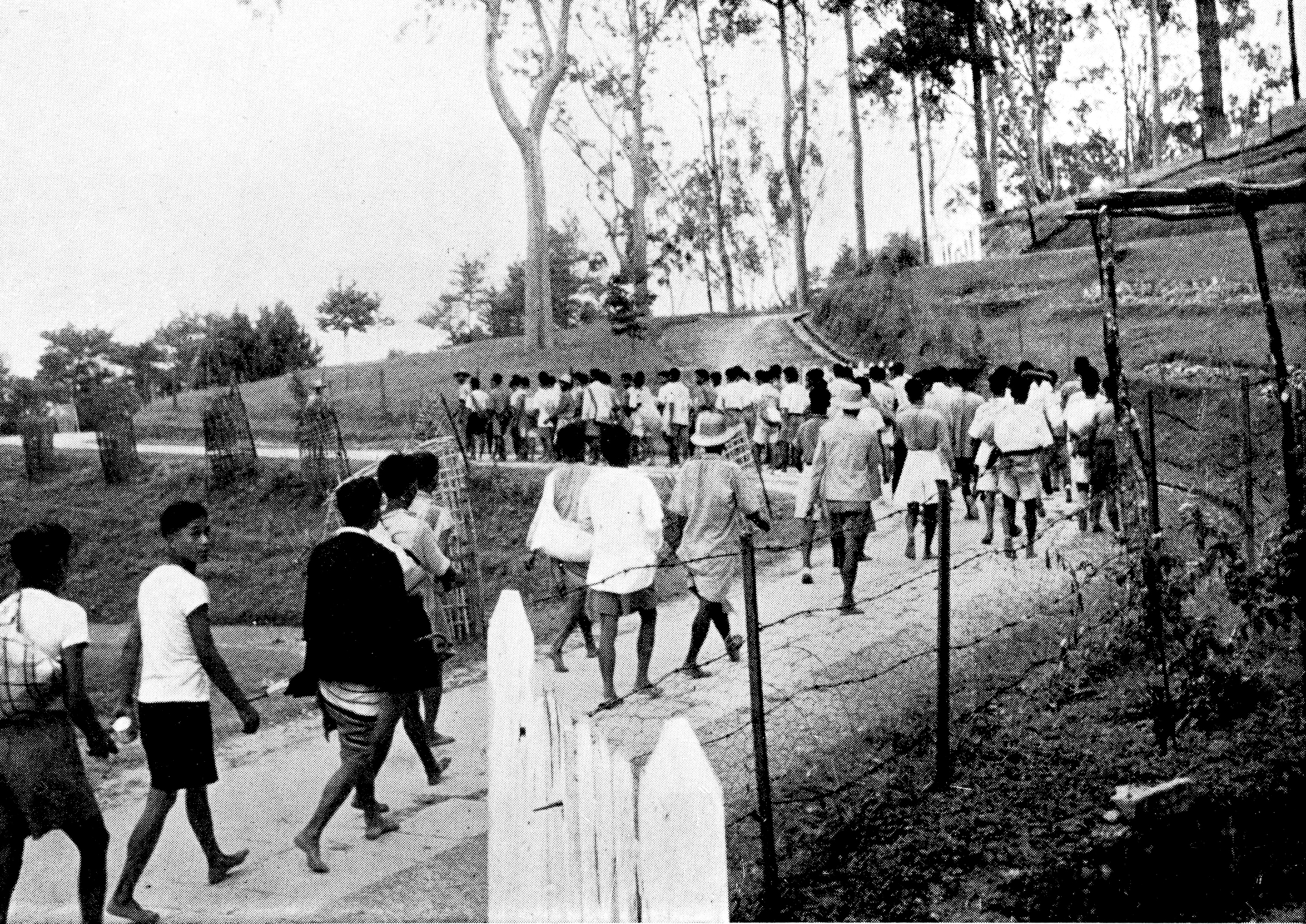
Lushai recruits making a journey to enlist for World War II.

McCall established twelve tactics that would comprise the Total Defense Scheme. Beyond the total defence scheme, other considerations were also undertaken. The first aspect is stimulating discussion among the people to support their chiefs to side with the British. Secondly, McCall was determined to counter the defeatist teachings of the Indian National Congress, who claimed the Japanese would become another colonial master. Countering this was important to stimulate the sacrifice needed to defend the Indian territories. McCall was also wary of the influence of Subhas Chandra Bose and the Azad Hind movement of exiled regiments surrendered to the Japanese in Malaya, Java and Burma. Furthermore, unlike other British administrators and merchants, such as the tea estate owners, McCall and his wife remained in India among the Lushais. Both of them carried a capsule of potassium cyanide from Calcutta to be used in the event of capture.

During the war, McCall would be recalled as superintendent of the Lushai Hills and placed in Shillong. In protest of the decision, McCall claimed that "he represent(ed) the personification of British integrity" to the region's people. Andrew Clow was responsible and replaced McCall with the political officer of Shillong instead. In his memoirs, McCall wrote of the event as Black May of 1943. Lushai chiefs would contact him and his wife to question why he would leave during such a crucial moment. In a letter from Andrew Clow on 10 November 1944, McCall was accredited with implementing the Total Defense Scheme and his far-seeing and accurate judgement. Clow's decision has been explained primarily due to his private secretary's relationship with McCall and his status as a civilian. James P. Mill and McCall were both experts on the tribal regions but had vastly differing views on it. Due to this, it has been argued that Mills influenced Clow's decision to some extent as a power struggle. A more prominent reason was that the Total Defense Scheme required a military officer within the chain of command rather than a civilian. This was to avoid turning the Total Defense Scheme into a rogue mechanism. In his diary, McCall criticized the decision of the military commanders who had never set foot in the tribal areas.

Three months after his dismissal in August, McCall wrote to Mills about Mill's sabotage of the Total Defense Scheme and his role as superintendent. McCall's letter to Mills outlined ten reasons to reinstate the Total Defense Scheme. One of the reasons were that the Army Commander should recognise the integrity of the Lushai Hills cannot be defended solely by their own troops.

However, Mills' opinions were backed by L.L. Peters, the administrative officer of the South Lushai Hills subdivision of the district. Peters did not believe all chiefs held the mettle and leadership to implement the Total Defense Scheme. Furthermore, Peters did not believe that a married civilian officer had a duty to engage in combat involuntarily along with his wife. Furthermore, he did not believe the division of the Lushais and Chins could lead to further animosity or conflict.

== Later life ==
Major McCall with British and Lushai Leaders in 1945

McCall's services were recognised by being made O.B.E. He retired from the Indian Civil Service and participated in some businesses in Rhodesia. McCall would return to England and reside in Poole. His other commitments were described as photography and writing, including the publishing of his book, Lushai Chrysalis, in 1949. Towards his final days, McCall developed blindness and partial paralysis. He died on 8 May 1978 and was buried in Bournemouth Crematorium and North Cemetery.

== Family ==
McCall married Jean Chrisholm Elliot Scott, who was widowed (formerly Culbard), on 17 October 1924 in Calcutta, India. He had one daughter.

== Selected works ==
- McCall, Anthony Gilchrist (1949). Lushai Chrysalis. London: Luzac.

== Sources ==
- Chaltuahkhuma (1987). History of Mizoram. Aizawl: M.D.C and Sons.
- My Heritage Ltd. "India, Marriages, 1792-1948" (Document). Online Database: MyHeritage.com.
- The Times (13 June 1940). "Prayer in Assam". The Times (Letter to the Editor). No. 48641. London, England. p. 7.
- The Times (12 May 1978). "Major A.G. McCall". The Times (obituary). No. 60299. London, England. p. 18.
- Chatterjee, Suhas (1990). Mizo Encyclopaedia. Aizawl: Jaico Publishing House.
- Alexander, Colin R (August 2019). Administering Colonialism and War: The Political Life of Sir Andrew Clow of the Indian Civil Service. New Delhi: Oxford University Press. p. 158. ISBN 9780199096954.
- Vanlalchhuanawma (2007). Christianity and Subaltern Culture: Revival Movement as a Cultural Response to Westernisation in Mizoram. Delhi: Indian Society for Promoting Christian Knowledge. ISBN 978-81-7214-901-7.
