= List of superintendents of Mizoram =

The Superintendent of the Lushai Hills (later Superintendent of Mizo District) was the central administrative authority of the Lushai Hills in India from 1889 to 1952. The superintendent served under the Chief Commissioner of Assam, acting under the Viceroy and Governor General of India.

== Powers and functions ==
The administration of the Lushai Hills district was within the power of the Chief Commissioner of Assam, the superintendent and the assistants of the superintendent. The superintendent upheld the authority of the chiefs who ruled over their people in a policy of indirect rule. Chiefs would report to the superintendent of any serious crimes such as murder, rape and serious accidents under their jurisdiction. The superintendent held the power to regulate the succession of chiefs and the inheritance rights of villages after the death of a chief. If a minor chief inherited a chiefdom, the superintendent would be authorised to appoint guardians. The superintendent also held the power to partition villages and establish new ones, with the choice of headmen and any number of houses to be assigned. Boundaries of the chiefs would be enforced so that the jurisdiction of disputes was clear.

The control of the police in the district was vested in the superintendent. In criminal justice, the superintendent had the freedom to decide on a death sentence, deportation/transportation and imprisonment with permission from the chief commissioner. All proceedings are summoned to the superintendent with rules on ability to appeal to the Chief Commissioner. In civil matters the superintendent considered traditional Lushai customs.

== Leaders of the Lushai Hills ==
Number	Name	Term of Office		Notes
Political Officers of the North Lushai Hills
1	Captain H.R Browne	1890	1890	Captain Browne was assigned the first political officer of the North Lushai Hills. His headquarters were in Aizawl. Browne's chief responsibility as political officer was to disarm the Lushai tribes. Browne held a chief's conference on 13 June 1890 at Fort Aijal and declared the suspension of chieftainship for Zahrawka and Lianphunga for the Chengri Valley raid. A fine for 15 guns was additionally imposed. Browne did not enact harsh measures on Lengpunga as he did not wish to antagonize a prestigious and influential chief. On his way from Aizawl to Changsil post, Browne was ambushed by a western chief, Thonsuma. Outnumbered with only 16 soldiers all sepoys were killed and one escaped to relay the news. As a result, Brown was killed 6 September 1890. Browne's weapons were looted and he was brought to Changsil post fifteen minutes later where he died. After his death, Khalkama was emboldened to raid Fort Aijal.
2	R.B McCabe	1890	1892	R.B McCabe was the political officer to introduce taxes and the coolie system of quotas for Mizo youths at low wages. The coolie system and quotas would continue until abolishment in 1953. His administration saw Rev William Williams visit with the first influence of Christianity in the Lushai Hills.
3	A.W Davis	1892	1894	A.W Davis renounced Aizawl as the capital and renamed it Fort Aijal and staffed it with 100 soldiers.
4	Granville Henry Loch (Acting)	1893	1894	G.H Loch is responsible for the development of Aizawl into a city and the establishment of roads and infrastructure around the Lushai Hills. Loch was responsible for building the Lammual, a field for military drills. He is also known for giving a printing press to the Mizo Presbyterian Church, now known as the Loch Printing Press.
5	A.W Davis	1893	1894	
6	Alexander Porteous	1894	1897	A. Porteus built two outposts at Siallukawt and Serchhip villages. He is also known for presiding over the arrival of Frederick William Savidge and James Herbert Lorrain, who contributed to the creation of the Mizo alphabet and the official beginning of the Christianization of the Lushai Hills.
7	Major John Shakespear	1897	1898	The North and South Lushai Hills were merged. Shakespear continued as Superintendent.
Superintendents of the South Lushai Hills
1	C.S. Murray	1 April 1891	16 April 1891	Captain C.S Murray was a military officer in the Government of Bengal. He was assigned to the Lushai Hills on account of his achievements in subduing the Bhutias and Lepchas in Darjeeling and his participation in the Chin-Lushai Expedition. Murray held a chief's durbar on 3 April 1890 explaining the intentions of the British government Murray was sacked from his position after a court case by Zakapa. Murray attempted to demand women for sex and insulted Zakapa by threatening to take his wife upon refusal. Zakapa attacked Murray and managed to decapitate two sepoys before Murray burned the village. He was replaced by Shakespear, who stood by Zakapa in court.
2	Captain John Shakespear	1891	1896	Brokered a settlement with Chieftainess Darbilhi to allow the establishment of Fort Tregear.Became a foster brother to Darbilhi. Led the expedition and capture of Ropuiliani and her son Lalthuama, the central resistance to British rule.
3	R.H Sneyd Hutchinson	1896	1898	After Zakapa's rebellion on Murray's injudicious conduct, Hutchinson was assigned to quell the South Lushai rebellion of 1891 in February. Hutchinson failed to capture Zakapa but succeeded in capturing Zakapa's allies: Lalthuma, Dakopa, Kapchunga and Lemkam. Hutchinson was further assigned to conciliate the tribes of Vantura (Howlong) and Tonglion (Lakher). He undertook a risk and met with Vantura who had been shot by Tonglion's men and died in Hutchinson's arms. After torturing the women of Zakapa's clan, Hutchinson failed to attain his whereabouts and capture him. Hutchinson was later reassigned to his original office of the Chittagong Hill Tracts.
Superintendents of the Lushai Hills District
1	Major John Shakespear	1898	1899	
2	Captain H.W.G. Cole	1899	1900	H.W.G Cole was responsible for abolishing the title of political officer and changing it to superintendent. Cole erected tombstones of Queen Victoria in every village in Mizoram and held a torch ceremony for the coronation of Edward VII. His rule saw harsh punishment on disturbances of the peace such as the hanging of three cutthroat robbers. He is also responsible for the circle system which limited and demarcated the jurisdiction of chiefs and their possible migrations for jhumming cycles. He embarked on a policy of limiting chief power by creating more chiefs and involving within the institution of Mizo chieftainship more deeply. He oversaw the first school in Mizoram opening in 1899.
3	Major John Shakespear	1900	1903	Shakespeare further contributed to the administration by creating 11 blocks in Northern Mizoram subdivision and 7 blocks in the Southern Mizoram subdivision.
4	Loftus Otway Clarke (Acting)	1903	1904	
5	Major John Shakespear	1904	1905	
6	Major John Campbell Arbuthnott	1905	1905	
7	Major Granville Henry Loch	1905	1906	
8	Major H.W.G Cole	1905	1911	H.W.G Cole is also credited with the encouragement of farming potatoes in Mizoram. He established a bazaar in Aizawl in 1909. Cole was also the superintdent during Peter Fraser's campaign against the Bawi system of the Lushai Hills. Cole deported Fraser, but Fraser managed to bring the issue to parliament with the help of Lloyd George and succeeded. Cole left the Lushai Hills as a result.
9	Major W. Kennedy	1911	1912	Kennedy oversaw the mautam famine of 1911. Kennedy took initiative in addressing the issue with an application for a loan of Rs. 800,000 from the British Raj government.
10	F.C Henniker	1912	1912	F.C Henniker worked with Mizo elders and scholars on researching the nature of the mautam famine. With assistance, he was the first administrator to map out the upcoming famines and realize their cyclical nature as an ecological phenomenon.
11	Major Granville Henry Loch	1912	1913	
12	J Hezlett	1913	1917	J Hezlett worked towards repaying the debts of responding to the mautam famine under Kennedy. He oversaw Lushai volunteers for World War One to fight against Germany.
13	H.A.C Colguhoun	1917	1919	Colguhun oversaw the Spanish flu's influence in Mizoram. Lushai volunteers from World War One had developed immunity and were in charge of digging graves for the victims.
14	Walter Lawrence Scott	1919	1921	W.L Scott opened the Assam Rifles to Mizo volunteers. He is also credited with defending Tripura's claims to Mizo territory.
15	S.N Mackenzie	1921	1922	
16	W.L Scott	1922	1923	
17	S.N Mackenzie	1923	1924	
18	N.E. Parry	1924	1928	Parry oversaw the development of changes in the Lushai Hills in his four-year administration, which concerned the preservation of indigenous culture and codification of customary law.
19	Charles George Gordon Helme	1928	1932	Presided over a period of intense rainfall which led to logistical issues and stoppage of services such as mail and food. This period is known as Minpui Kum. Helme tried to control the population of Aizawl and began a program of deporting excess dwellers into outlying villages. Exemptions were provided to government workers, missionaries and vulnerable individuals.
20	Major Anthony Gilchrist McCall	1931	1943	
21	A.R.H MacDonald	1943	1945	
22	J. Dumbreck	1945	1945	
23	A.I Bowman	1945	1946	
24	Captain D.A Penn	1946	1947	
25	Leonard Lamb Peters (Note: Peters remained as superintendent after Indian Independence.)	1947	1949	
26	Satyen Barkataki	1947	1953	Established a voluntary road construction project between Aizawl and Lunglei of 128 miles.

== See also ==
- British rule in the Lushai Hills
- Chief Commissioner of Assam

== Sources ==
- Barkataki, Satyen (1969). Assam. Assam: National Book Trust.
- Lalrimawia (1995). Mizoram History and Cultural Identity (1890-1947). Guwahati: Spectrum Publications.
- Nag, Sajal (2008). Pied Pipers in North-East India: Bamboo-flowers, Rat-famine and the Politics of Philanthropy. (1881-2007). New Delhi: Manohar Publishers & Distributors. ISBN 978-81-7304-311-6.
- Samuelson, Ramchuani Sena (1985). Love Mizoram. Imphal: Goodwill Press.
