= Mizo people =

Ethnic group in northeastern India

Mizo
Mizo hnam
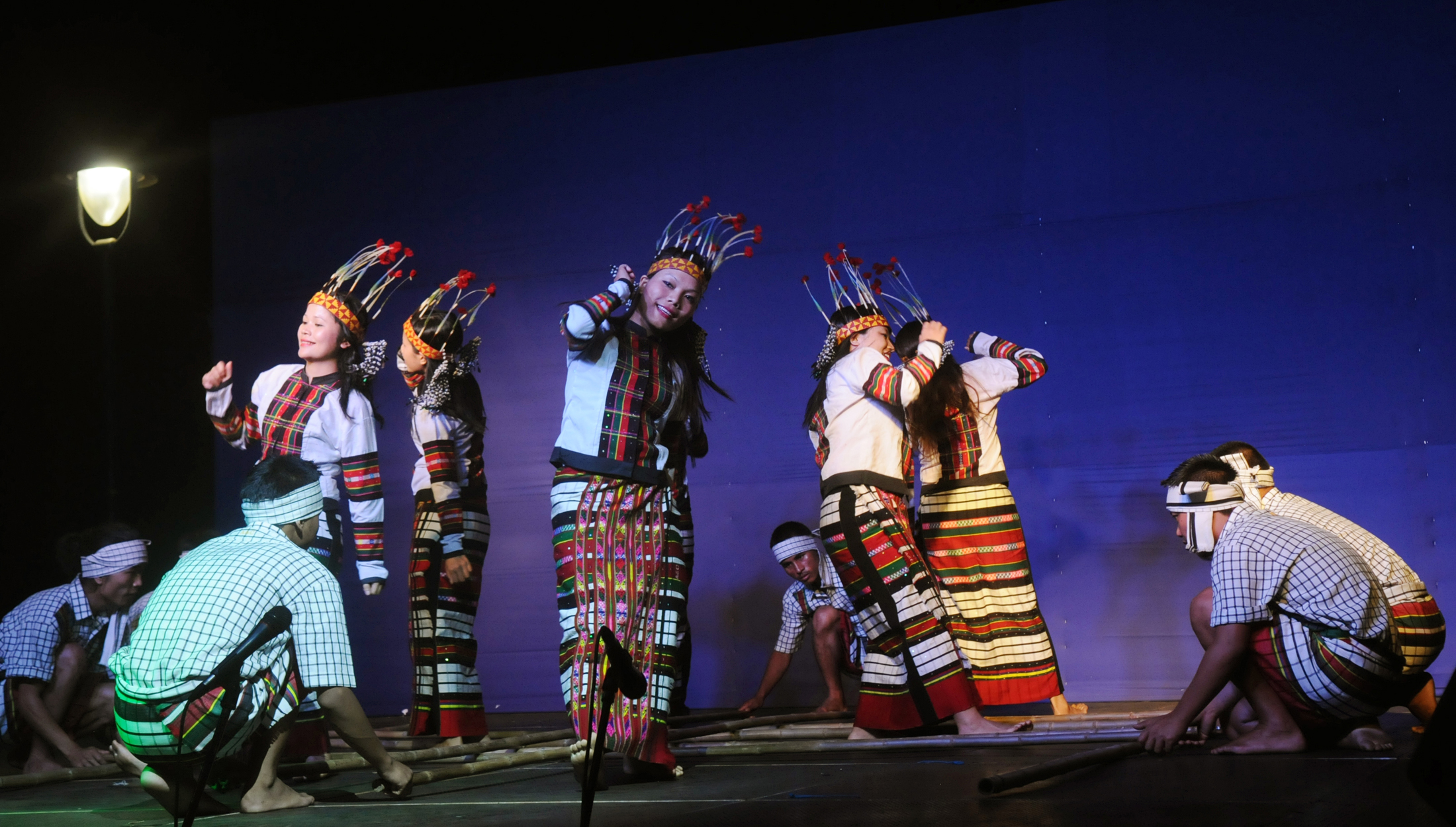
- Mizo traditional Cheraw dance

Total population
- 1,400,000+ (2011–2019) (Note: including the Mizo diaspora's respective statistics)

Regions with significant populations
- India: 1,022,616 (Note: Mizo proper: 830,846; Hmâr, Lakher, Pawi, and Paite in Mizoram combined with Mizo proper: 10,22616)
- Mizoram: 914,026 (Note: Mizo proper: 802,763; Hmâr, Lakher, Pawi, and Paite in Mizoram combined with Mizo proper: 914,026)
- Manipur: 55,581 (Note: Mizo proper: 6,500; Hmâr combined with Mizo proper: 55,581. Paite in Manipur are not counted as they identify as Zomi in Manipur.)
- Assam: 33,329 (Note: Mizo proper: 4,006; Hmâr combined with Mizo proper: 33,329. Paite in Assam are not counted as they identify as Zomi in Assam.)
- Meghalaya: 6,439 (Note: Mizo proper: 4,445; Hmâr combined with Mizo proper: 6,439. Paite in Meghalaya are not counted as they identify as Zomi in Meghalaya.)
- Tripura: 5,810 (Note: Mizo proper: 5,639; Hmâr combined with Mizo proper: 5,810.)
- Arunachal Pradesh: 1,445
- Nagaland: 1,264
- Myanmar: 33,554 (1973)
- United States Canada: approx. 6,000 (Note: Spread out across US and Canada. When considering the Chin population in the US it numbers 30,000)
- Israel: 6,000

Languages
- Mizo

Religion
- Majority: Christianity; Minority: Judaism, and Mizo Sakhua (Note: Historical majority)

Related ethnic groups
- (Zo):Chin people, Kuki people, Thadou people, Hallam-Kuki people, Asho people (Zomi):Paihtê people, Zou people, Vaiphei people, Simte people, Suktê people (Naga): Aimol people, Kom people, Chiru people Subgroups (Mizo subgroups): Hmâr people, Lai people, Mara people, Râlte people, Paihtê: Kukish-speaking peoples

- People: Mizo hnam
- Language: Duhlián ṭawng
- Country: Mizoram, Zoram

The Mizo people (historically called the Lushais (Note: Lushai is a colonial misnomer encompassing different tribes living in the then Lushai hills; not to be confused with the Lusei tribe)) are a Tibeto-Burman ethnic group primarily from the Indian state of Mizoram. Further communities beyond Mizoram live in neighboring northeast Indian states like Manipur, Assam, Meghalaya, and Tripura, with minority populations also found in Myanmar. In recent years, Mizo diaspora communities have sprung up in the United States, Canada and Israel.

Oral Mizo history states Chhînlung as the original homeland of the people. The nature of Chhînlung as a location or an eponym is still unclear This origin story is shared among various other Zohnahtlâk tribes.

The Chin people of Myanmar and the Kuki people of India and Bangladesh are the closely related to Mizos, with many of the Mizo migrants in Myanmar having assimilated within Chin society. The Chin, Kuki, and Mizo, are collectively known as Zo people (Zohnahthlâk; lit. 'descendants of Zo'), all of whom speak the Mizo language.

The Mizo language, also known as Duhlián ṭawng, is part of the Tibeto-Burman language family. Regionally the language is classed within the Zohnathlâk languages spoken by the Zo people. Mizo is the official language of Mizoram, where it serves as the primary lingua franca alongside the English language.

Before British rule in the Lushai Hills, the Mizo people organized themselves under a system of Mizo chieftainship. A notable chiefdom was the Confederacy of Selesih. Other notable chiefdoms were Tualte under Vanhnuailiana and Aizawl under Lalsavunga. Following British annexation of the Lushai Hills, the Mizos adopted Christianity via proselytization by missionaries. In the decolonisation period, the Mizo people asserted political representation with the founding of the Mizo Union.

The Lushai Hills was constituted as an autonomous district of Assam before being renamed as the Mizo district. Following the mautam famine of 1959, the Mizo National Front declared independence in the Mizo National Front uprising in 1966. The Indian government responded with the Bombing of Aizawl and Operation Accomplishment, an extensive village regrouping policy aimed at curbing insurgents. The unrest continued until 1986, when Mizoram was established as a state.

== Classification ==
The Indian Constitution contains provisions related to communities classified as Scheduled Tribes under Article 342. The term, however, is not defined and is subject to the discretion of the President and the Governor of the relevant state. The criterion for assessing categorisation informally considers indications of primitive traits, distinct culture, geographical isolation, shyness of community contact, and economic backwardness.

The Constitution (Scheduled Tribes) Order, dated 6 September 1950, designated the hill people of Assam and the Mizos as a Scheduled Tribe. Government policy follows Jawaharlal Nehru's five principles (tribal Panchsheel) to improve the quality of lives without disturbing their way of life. This focuses on encouragement of traditional talents, culture and knowledge; Tribal rights in land and forests; Tribal recruitment into administration and development; Harmonisation of policies without rivalry and judgment of civic growth.

== Definition and subgroups ==
The term "Mizo" is a collective name for the people inhabiting the State of Mizoram who have close affinity in dialect, origins and customs. Pachuau states that the Mizo identity was a result of increased self-consciousness of a distinct ethnic group which has had no formal basis of inclusion and exclusion but rather moulded by pre-colonial and post-colonial history granting it legitimacy. The most popular discourse on defining Mizo identity is that tribes are identified as being chhînlung chhuak (transl. emerging form Chhînlung). Mizos see themselves as a tribe and a nation but do not deny subclassifications of clans and tribes.

The word Mizo refers to the hill people living in Mizoram, but certain groups such as Chakmas, Reangs and Nepalis are not considered Mizo due to their lack of affinity. Mizo is thus used to include the people who share a common origin of migrating into present-day Mizoram. The main tribes under the Mizo ethnicity are Hmâr, Lusei, Râlte, Vangchhia, Paihtê, Fânai, Lai, Thado, Suktê etc.

There are as many as 17 clans of the Mizos and numerous subclans within them. These clans have their own dialects and customs, however the dialects differ little and it interchangeably understood. Mizo ṭawng/Duhlián ṭawng functions as the lingua franca of the Mizos.

=== Subgroups ===
There are five major clans or tribes of the Mizo people which are Hmâr, Lusei, Râlte, Lai (Pawi), and Mara (Lakher) which are known as the awzia (transl. foreigner/ speaker of foreign language). Some Lai and Mara tribes do not identify as Mizo despite being considered proper tribes of the Mizo group.

==== Hmâr ====
Hmâr in the Lusei dialect of Mizo means "north," indicating that the Hmârs lived at the north of the Luseis. However, current historians argue, that the name originates from a term of hair knot patterns as a clan identifier. They are descendants of Manmasi and term themselves Manmasi-nau (transl. children of Manmasi), who came out of the Chhînlung cave, known as Sinlung in the Hmâr dialect. Historical settlements of Mizoram such as Biate, Champhai and Vangchhia were historically inhabited by the Hmârs.

The Hmâr population decreased since the 1901 census as many began to consider themselves Mizo. The tribe currently claim a population of 150,000 under the Mizo classification. The Hmârs traditionally participated in artisan works such as blacksmithing, carpentry, brass workings and pottery.

The Hmâr were politically active within the Mizo community with the influence of educated elites from the Indian plains. Prominent Hmâr statesmen were H.K Bawichhuaka and Pachhunga, who played significant roles in the early period of the Mizo Union. However, following the formation of the Union Territory of Mizoram, the Hmârs became discontent with the deprivation of representation, where political power was vested within the Lusei and the Pawi-Lakher autonomous council. The discontent was intensified following the Mizo Accord and the ascension of Mizoram to statehood. The Hmâr People's Convention and Hmâr Volunteer Cell formed a separatist movement. The organisations demanded for the formation of an autonomous region for the Hmâr inhabited regions in Mizoram, Manipur and Cachar. The Hmârs settled an accord in 1994 before various factors led to a splinter with a demand for a separate Hmâr state instead.

==== Lusei ====
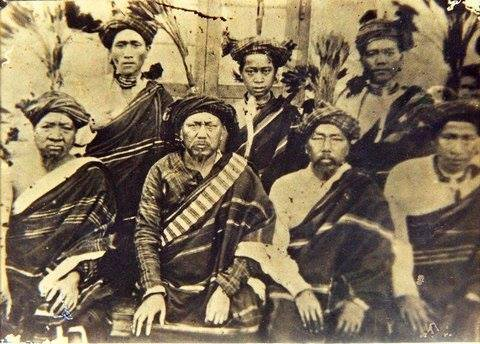
A picture of Lusei chiefs Sitting from L to R: Kairûma Biate khaw chief, Thanruma Bawlte chief, Khamliana Lungleng chief, Suakhnuna Tachhip chief Standing from L to R:Lalluaia Reiek chief, Hrangvunga Tripura Zampui tlangdung chief, Not known.

The former Mizo term Lushai descends from the Lusei tribe and was popularised following the Lushai Expedition. Originally, it referred to the tribes occupying south of Cachar, and began to be used as a term for all tribes west of the Kaladan river. The origin of the Lusei clan is relatively unknown compared to other Mizo subgroups. However, the Lusei claim to be distinct as early as settlement in the Chin Hills. Lusei is argued to be a linguistic classification for individuals who speak the Duhlián dialect. However, there is no genealogy for the Lusei as Lusei historiography has been dominated by chieftain dynasties such as the Sailo. The Paihtês claim that the Lusei descend from Boklua, an illegitimate son of the Paihtê chief Ngehguka.

The Lusei are also known as Duhlian. Traditionally, they were identified by how they tied their hair on the back of their head. According to early British historiography, the existing Lusei Chiefs all claimed to be descendants of a certain Ṭhangura, who is sometimes to Shakespear said to have sprung from the union of a Burman with a Paihtê woman. In Mizo historiography and oral history, Ṭhangura is the son of Zahmuaka, the first Lusei chief.

==== Râlte ====
The word Râlte is made up of two words: Râl (transl. enemy) and te being a plural marker. Due to the Chhînlung origin story, the Râlte people are regarded to be the noisiest members of the Mizo.

The Râlte claim to be the last group to leave Chhînlung with the mythical ancestors known as Hehua and Leplupi. Their two sons, Kheltea and Siakenga, conflicted over the distribution of their father's inheritance. This led to the younger Kheltea inheriting the assets and the two brothers setting up separate villages thus establishing the two main branches of the Râlte clan. Prominently documented Râlte chiefs include Mangkhaia, who was captured and ransomed but killed by Vanpuia, who did not receive a share of the ransom. Mangkhaia Lung (transl. Mangkhaia's memorial) was erected by his father Mangthawnga for this. The Râlte were distinguished from the larger Lusei clan for maintaining their dialect and being known for not building zawlbûk originally until being influenced by Lusei chiefs. The Khelte and Siakeng themselves differ in traditional sacrificial customs. Historically, the Râlte resisted absorption into the Lusei chiefs and maintained their language in their villages.

==== Lai (Pawi) ====
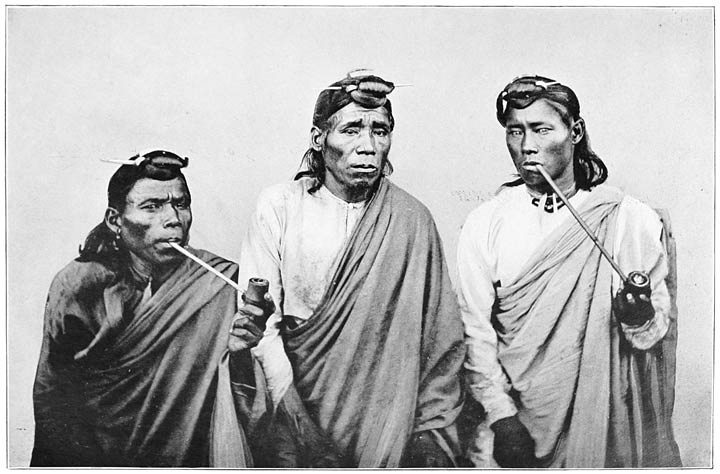
A picture of 3 Fânai clansmen

Pawi is a name given by Lusei to those who tie their hair on the top of their foreheads. The Pawi refer to themselves as Lai. Hakha, (Mizo:Halkha) is the capital city of Chin State, which is the main settlement of Pawis in Myanmar, where they are known as the Hakha Chin people.

The Hakha Chin people do not identify themself as Mizo and prefer the name Lai or Chin. This is due to the political decision under Section 2(4) of the Chin Special Division Act, amended in 1957. Mizos in Burma adopted the Chin identity to become Burmese citizens. As a result, half of the Mizo population was effectively discouraged from calling themselves Mizos.

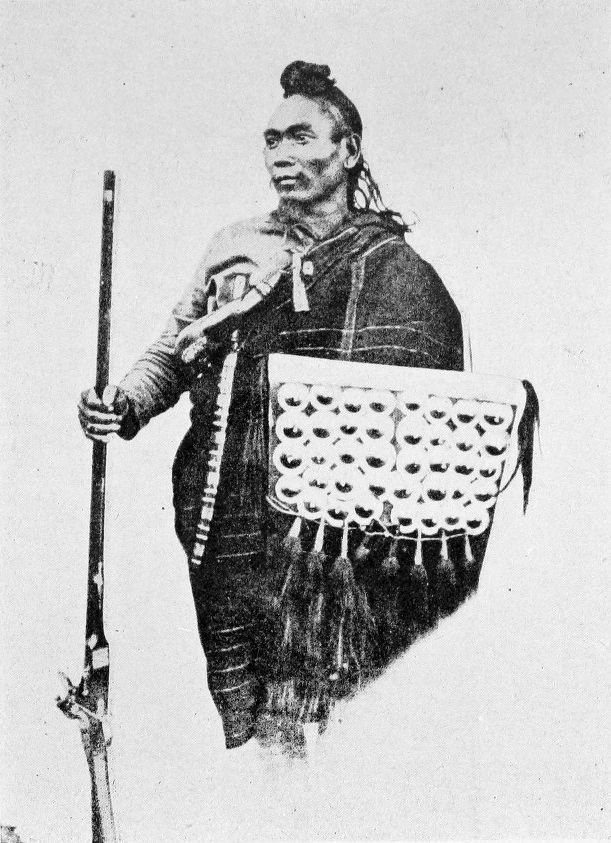
Fânai chief Zakapa from 1909.

The Lai people of southern Mizoram, a segment of the much larger Lai/Chin population, were granted an Autonomous District Council under the Sixth Schedule of the Constitution to support their identity. Lawngtlai was created as the headquarters of Lai Autonomous District Council.

==== Mara (Lakher) ====
The Mara people are known by different names: they are Lakher in Mizo and Shendu in Arakanese. They primarily inhabit the southeastern region of the Lushai Hills. While the Maras are believed to have originated in the north, historical accounts suggest that they migrated from various locations within central Chin State, likely due to external pressures from the east. Their migration route to their present settlements can be traced with relative accuracy. Their settlement in the Lushai Hills is estimated to have been established around 200 to 300 years ago.

== Etymology ==
The term Mizo is derived from two Mizo words: Mi (transl. "person" or "civilian") and Zo (transl. hill). According to Schendel, Zo means 'highland' or perhaps 'remote'. Sangkima argues the Zo emerges from ancient China. Since Mizos have historically named their tribes and clans after leaders, Zo could possibly be a development of Zhou of the Zhou dynasty. The similarity of Zhou to variations of Zo such as: Jo, Yo indicates that the term possibly descended from the tribal beginnings of the Zhou Chinese state. Another proposal is that is descends from the Chinese term Miao Tsu (simplified Chinese: 苗族书; traditional Chinese: 苗族; pinyin: Miáozú) which was applied to the non-Han tribes in southwest China at the time the Mizos had cohabited together with them.

During the British colonial era, the Mizo people were known as the Lushai people, an anglicised form of Lusei, one of the prominent clans among the Mizo people.

The Mizo people were known as the ကလင်ကော့ (Ka Lin Kaw/ Kalinko) by the Burmans when 800 Mizo men joined Maha Bandula's cavalry in 1823 though detailed etymological studies specific to this name are limited.

There is a theory that due to the alpine climate, the hill people could've been named Zomi or Mizo as "people of the cold regions". By this definition, Zo means cold region, and Mi means men. However, outside groups' lack of continuation of this name doesn't support the theory.

Lalthangliana argues that the name derives from the town of Zopui, built in about 1765. The town was ruled under Lallula, the progenitor of the modern Sailo chiefs. Due to Lallula's success in raids against their enemies, the Chins, it is plausible that the people prided themselves on their settlement name as the Braves of Zopui. Pui (transl. big) in Zopui hence refers to the big town of Zo. Due to the fact that the term Mizo wasn't included in the 1901 British census and became common by the 1960s, it supports the theory of Mizo being a modern name. However other historians such as Vanchhunga argue that the term Mizo was being used as early as during the settlements in Burma as the forefathers use to state "Keini Mizote chuan" (transl. We are the Mizos). The earliest documented usage of the term Mizo was by John Shakespear in his monograph which proclaimed the people refer to themself in this term. In the 1961 census of India, 28000 Hmâr, 109000 Lusei, 9000 Paihtê, 40000 Pawi and 41000 Râlte declared themselves as Mizos which constituted 96% of the total population. In Burma, the identification of individuals as Mizos decreased. This was because, unless they identified as Chin, the government of Burma did not consider them citizens.

Before the term Mizo, the peoples of the Chin Hills, Lushai Hills, Chittagong Hill Tracts were described as being a part of the Zo (Jo/Yaw) country according to Vincenzo Sangermano in 1833. This view was reinforced by Thomas Herbert Lewin who in his book A fly on the wheel describes generic nation of the people in Lushai Hills as "Dzo".

The popularisation of the term Mizo is also argued to be a political influence. The emergence of the Mizo Union began to replace the terms Lusei or Lushai with Mizo as a conscious choice to incorporate all the tribes of the district at the time. In 1954, the Lushai Hills district was transformed into the Mizo District with a change of name act.

Mizo is a broad ethnic classification of subgroups or clans inhabiting Mizoram (in colonial times the Lushai Hills) in India. Members of many subgroups, especially speakers of the Central Kuki-Chin languages have joined and adopted the Mizo category.

== Ancestral origins ==
=== Chhînlung ===
Some Mizos have a belief that their ancestors left a place known as "Chhînlung" to immigrate. Some agree that this location is in Northwest China near the upper Mekong Valley. Lalthangliana argues that the Tibeto-Burman ancestors of the Mizos resided in the Tao Valley of present-day Gansu, northeast of Tibet. The Mizos have songs and tales that have been passed down from one generation to the next by influential people about the splendor of the old Chhînlung civilization. It is argued that Chîn refers to the Qin Dynasty and that lung in the Mizo language refers to the heart as well as rock, hence possibly referring to the heartland of the Qin Empire at the time. Oral history among Mizo communities have passed down hla (transl. song) of the Chhînlung origin and have surmised that the ancestors of the Mizos left Chhînlung hurriedly:

Mizo:

Khaw singlungah kal siel ang ka zuang suak a,
Mi le nello tam e,
Hriemi hraiah.
English:
Out of the village Sinlung,
I jumped out like a siel [sic] gayal,
Innumerable were the encounters

With the children of men.

— Essay on the History of the Mizos

This hla has been argued to be a reference to a Chinese military excursion on the ancestors of the Mizos and attributed to Qin Shi Huang's military campaigns.

Mizo:

Ka siengna Sinlung ram hmingthang,
Ka nu ram, ka pa ram Ngai.
Chawngzil ang kokir theih chang Siena
Ka nu ram, ka pa ram ngai.
English:
My mother-land, famous Sinlung
Home of my own ancestors
Could it be called back like Chawngzil,

Home of my own ancestor.

— Essay on the History of the Mizos

This hla is argued to be of more recent composition according to its sentiment, language and construction.

Guite argues that the Chhînlung cavern or cave wasn't the origin of the Mizo tribes but rather an important settlement along their migration routes into their present-day settlements. Zawla argues that the Mizos originated from the Great Wall of China built in 225 BC. Zawla suggests the Mizos were a Mongolian group who migrated from Western China between the Yangtze and Huanghe. Haokip suggests that based on the Mausoleum of Qin Shi Huang following his death, that Chhînlung could refer to the vast networks of caverns and gates built underground where he was buried. The linguistic study of Sinlung and khul further implies that Khulsinlung together means tomb or graveyard covered with stones; however, further research is required into this claim.

Historian, Sangkima, argues that Chhînlung is located in Sichuan province of China. The homophonic name Xinlong is located in Sichuan and proposed as a possible location. This has been rejected as it is unknown if Chhînlung refers to a Tibetan or Mandarin name. Xinlong is a sinicised name while the Tibetan name is Nyarong. Furthermore, the county was named Xinlong in 1951 hence not supporting the theory. Another proposal is that Chhînlung is an eponym of a ruler, as traditionally the Mizos declared their origin by their allegiance to their chief rather than a geographic location.

=== Departure from China ===
According to K. S. Latourette, there were political upheavals in China in 210 BC when the dynastic rule was abolished and the whole empire was brought under one administrative system. Rebellions broke out and chaos reigned throughout the Chinese state. Joshi argues that the Mizos left China as part of one of those waves of migration.

Anthropologist B. Lalthangliana traces the origins of the Mizo people to northwestern China, particularly the Gansu region along the Yellow River valleys. Historical records, including the Shi Ji (transl. Historical Records), Hou Han Shu (transl. Book of the Later Han), and Xin Tang Shu (transl. New Book of Tang), suggest that the ancestors of the Tibeto-Burman groups descended from the Di-Qiang people, who lived in the Yellow River valleys over 7,000 years ago. Two major migrations of the Di-Qiang people contributed to the spread of Tibeto-Burman groups:

- First Migration (3000 BC – 2000 BC): Triggered by population growth due to agricultural abundance.
- Second Migration (1st century AD – 6th century AD): Driven by warfare and political instability.

The original Tibeto-Burman ancestors of the Mizos are estimated to have originally settled in the Gobi Desert and northeast of Tibet.

The ancestors of the Mizos and other Tibeto-Burman groups are identified as the Qiang (Chinese: 羌; pinyin: Qiāng; Wade–Giles: Ch'iang). The Qiang were said to have been established in the western areas of Sichuan, Shanxi and Gansu. They were neighbours to the Shang dynasty, where their diplomacy was characterised as warlike, consisting of raids, looting and kidnapping for human sacrifice. One branch travelled south towards Burma and formed the modern Tibeto-Burman groups. Vumson argues that the Tanguts formed from the Qiang people were forced southwards by Chinese expansion at an early stage. This was argued as of the Tibeto-Burman languages, only Tibetans maintained a written script, indicating that civilisation did not penetrate them before around the time of the Zhou dynasty. The absence of the influence of Buddhism indicates that by the first century AD, the Tibeto-Burman ancestors of the Mizos had shifted their villages away from its influence.

In analysing Chinese history, Verghese and Thanzawna argue that based on religious beliefs of the Mizos, there was a lot in common with the Huns, Saks, Scythians and other slaves who were made to work on the Great Wall. The legend of a Mizo written language on scripture being devoured by a dog is likened to the possibility of referring to the destruction and burnings of scrolls, books and documents recorded on bamboo and palm leaves as ordered by Emperor Qin Shi Huang. K.S. Latourette states that the Chinese in their early dynasties believed in spirits in nature such as rivers, mountains, stars and other natural objects. They further believed that there were two souls, one in the flesh and another ascended higher. The Tartars during this period believed in a God known as Nagitay who watches over children, cattle, and crops. Verghese and Thanzawna argue that Nagitay and Pathian are similar as being a one true God with dominion over earth but not interfering in mortal lives. The Mizo people also traditionally believed in two souls (Thlarau). Mizo animism believed in the prevalence of spirits in natural objects and an afterlife known as mitthi khua and pialrâl. Hence, due to these similarities, it is argued that the Tibeto-Burman ancestors of the Mizos had contact with the Huns and Tartars to develop such religious beliefs.

The Mizos maintained an animist religion upon leaving China. This indicates that the migration from Chhînlung occurred before the introduction and adoption of Buddhism in the first century. By the 6–8th century, it was assumed that the Mizos were in the Chamdo area of Tibet and moved further south during the rule of Empress Wu Zetian. This is argued as there is no influence of Nestorian Christianity in the influence of Mizo religion. It is also argued that during the southern migration, the Tibeto-Burman ancestors of the Mizos mingled and were influenced by South Chinese ethnic groups and borrowed aspects of their culture, language and custom. It can be argued that the Mizo ancestors lived among Ailao Kingdom with historic ancestors of groups such as the Tai people, Lolo, Miao and possibly other tribes in the Jiulong Mountains around Baoshan before being disrupted by Chinese expansions. The Mizos would migrate to the Burmese-Tibet border and eject the Beian Kadu tribes into Manipur and Burma. Sangkima supports this through lunguistic analysis. Yunnan, which was home to several tribes, influenced the Mizos language with loan words from the Loloish languages. The Karen people who are thought to share the origin in Yunnan share similar origin stories and folklore and animism beliefs, further supporting this theory. Due to this period, Sangkima proposes the term Mizo emerged as the Chinese term Miao Tsu (simplified Chinese: 苗族书; traditional Chinese: 苗族; pinyin: Miáozú) was applied to the non-Han tribes in southwest China at the time.

=== Genetics ===
Genetic studies have explored the origins of the Mizo people. Research indicates that the Mizo, along with other Kukish-speaking groups, have East Asians and Southeast Asians genetic markers. A study published in Genome Biology in 2004 found that the Y-DNA haplotypes of Mizo men were distinctly East and Southeast Asian. The Mizo people typically exhibit physical features common among East and Southeast Asian populations. Further genetic studies have proposed the Mizo groups to originate from two haplotypes. The predominant haplotype O refers to populations originating in Central or East Asia as being part of the Eurasian clan of early Siberians. Haplotype H refers to South Central Asia and Indian ancestry.

== History ==
=== Upper Chindwin ===
During the 8th century the emergence of a Zo kingdom was evidenced in Chinese records. Fan Chuo a Tang dynasty administrator who published the Man Shu (simplified Chinese: 蛮书; traditional Chinese: 蠻書; pinyin: mánshū; lit. 'barbarian document'; roughly means the book on the southern tribes) records a kingdom on the Chindwin river which the Chinese refer to as Mi No. Zou argues the document refers to the Chindwin people living south of the Nanzhao Kingdom. In the Chinese text, the people are termed as Mi No, the Chinese name of the Chindwin and hence comparable to Chin. The Mi No were stated to have been victims of Nanzhao's conquests in Western Yunnan. The kingdom was described as referring to their princes and chiefs as Shou (simplified Chinese: 寿; traditional Chinese: 壽; pinyin: Shòu). The structures lacked inner or outer walls but the Mi No king possessed a palace of pillars and gold and silver. In 835 AD the Nanzhao invaded the Mi No and looted their gold and silver. Due to the lack of distinct cultural identities, Zou argues that the Chinese scholars simply demarcated the Zo people as the Shou or Mi No of the Chindwin. Due to the pressure of the Nanzhao, Tibet and China, the Zo tribes migrated southwards towards the Irrawaddy River and settled deeper in Burma by the 9th century. The title of Shou resembles the term sho used by the Chins in the plains regions to designate themselves. Furthermore, Sing Khaw Khai argues that the pillars of the Mi No king were ancestral pillars erected by the Tedim in the middle of their courtyards for ancestor sacrifices.

Fan Chuo did not specify the location of the Mi No palace, instead indicating it is 60 days stages south west of Yongchang (Baoshan) in Nanzhao, which is now situated between the Salween River and Mekong River. The directions would thus indicate towards the Kale and Kabaw valleys. Since Khampat in the Kabaw valley was established in the mid-9th century, according to Lalthangliana, it is more likely that the Zo tribes lived under a Kale ruler. The Kale Valley was populated with a variety of tribes ranging from Sak, Kantu, Kaget, Kadu, Ingye, Kwan-yi, Shan people, etc. Despite being walled, Sing Khaw Khai argues that a succeeding Shan ruler built walls after the original rulers were conquered.

The Zo tribes entered with the Kachins. The Zo people are said to have taken a similar migration route to the Karen people via the Mekong River or Salween River or a caravan route from Suifu in western Sichuan to Bhamo in Burma to the east of the Irrawaddy River. The Shans had established a state at Hkamti Long, which was initially a military outpost by a Tibetan Prince from 1000 A.D. The outpost served as a frontier to the influence of the Nanzhao Kingdom and China in the region. The Shans began settling in Hukawng, Mogaung, Kabaw, Kale and a little in the Yaw valleys. The Shans mixed with the Zo based on the Mizo and Zahau oral history.

Thanga argues that the Mizos during this period settled in the Hukawng Valley. The Mizos resided in Auktawng, which is argued to be a corruption of Awksatlang in the Kabaw Valley. During this settlement period, the Mizos developed influence from the Shans and learned to drink tea. The main reason for migration from this settlement, according to oral history, was a famine known as Thingpui Tam (transl. Tea famine) during their stay in the Shan states. One of the earliest hla (transl. song) was inspired by the Thingpui Tam:

Mizo:

Shan khuoah lenpur a tla
Mi raza tlan thiera e.
English:
A severe famine visited Shan,

that made people run.

— Mizo poetry

However, the Mizos were stated to have prospered with the exchange of culture with the Tai Shan states including learning the art of war and use of iron implements and moulding of brass pipes. Hranglien Songate argues that the Mizos developed their great festivals from the influence of the Tai Shan states and their culture.

=== Arrival in the Kabaw Valley ===
It was in the Kabaw Valley that Mizos had cultural influence with the local Burmans. It is conceivable that the Mizos learned the technique of cultivation from the Burmans at Kabaw as many of their agricultural implements bore the prefix Kawl (transl. Burmese), signifying the origins. Some agricultural tools with the kawl prefix are: kawlhnam, kawlhrei, kawltu, kawlbahra, kawlhai, kawlthei, kawlfung, kawlhren and kawlper, etc. The influence of Burmese culture is also indicated by similarities in early games, musical instruments, dresses, and customs. Lalrimawia argues that traditions such as throwing of quoits, gauntlet, wrestling, merry-go-round and inkawlvar were aspects influenced by Burmese culture or interactions.

The Mizos began to migrate further down via the Chindwin River. However, the earliest Tibeto-Burman settlers, the Kadu tribes, had already established themselves along the upper portions of the Irrawady valley. The Kadu in Manipur were in conflict with the Kadu in Burma as the Mizos occupied the Chindwin valley. Furthermore, the Kadu's desire to settle the Chindwin stopped the Mizos from further migration East or West. For this reason, the Mizos contained themselves in the Kabaw Valley. Lalthangliana argues that the Mizos and the Burmese cohabited in Khampat against the Kadu tribes. An informal alliance was formed where the Burmese would not go beyond the Monywa and Alon in the Chindwin area, hence why the Mizos and Burmese did not have conflicts in this period. The Burmese instead migrated north to Myedu and Khetthin, where the Mizos were not inhabiting. As a result, the Mizo-Burmese alliance lasted from the 9th century to the 13th century. The Burmese fought their way through the various tribes such as the Mon, Wa, Sak, Kantu but never the Zo. Luce argues that the Zo were termed Khyang (transl. ally) by the Burmese and left them with possession of most of the Chindwin. Lehman, however, argues against this by stating that linguistic identity and ethnic identity don't respond neatly. This alliance and interaction were responsible for the cultural exchange. Lalthangliana notes that the Mizo language developed and borrowed significant loan words from the Burmese language. The Burmese-origin words were absorbed into the Mizo language and considered core features rather than loan words. The Mizos also maintained a tattooing practice, which is attributed to a Burmese introduced custom. The strongest legacy of Mizo-Burman relations is musical instruments. In particular, the brass gongs and drums, which were treated as heirlooms, were originally Burmese. Copper hairpins and similar heirlooms are assumed to be Burmese descended, as the Mizos were largely isolated from foreigners and had no access to copper mines. The cotton gin of the Mizo villages are also of a similar model to the Burmese and began in use during the settlements in the Kabaw valley.

Khampat in the Kabaw Valley (now in Myanmar) is known to have been the next Mizo settlement. The area claimed by the Mizos as their earliest town was encircled by an earthen rampart and divided into several parts. The residence of the ruler stood at the central block called Nan Yar (transl. palace site). The construction of the town indicates the Mizos had already acquired considerable architectural skills. They are said to have planted a banyan tree at the Nan Yar before they left Khampat as a sign that the town was made by them. The reason for leaving Khampat is not known but the Banyan tree was planted with the belief that they would return to Khampat when the branches reached the ground. It is speculated that either the Shans or the Manipuri were responsible for their departure. The population of the migration was exemplified in oral history, which recounts how, when the Mizos departed Khampat, they walked over two clusters of bamboo, which were reduced to dust. According to the Cheitharol Kumbaba, the Meitei and Pongs (Shans) had a common enemy known as the Kyang of Kapo. Zou argues that the Kyang of Kapo refers to the Khyang (Chin) of the Chindwin Basin. The Cheitharol Kumbaba states:

"[King Kiyamba] was victorious over the Kyangs of Kapo. Meetingu Kyampa and Choupha Khekkhompa, the king of Pong, made an alliance and fought (against the Kyangs). ... They attacked together Kyang Khampat of Kapo. They defeated Kyang. Captured in battle Mung of Takhen, Khamset, Khamkhai and Hokham."

The Meitei and the Shans divided the occupation of the Kabaw Valley among themselves. The Mizos through oral history maintained two hla regarding the legend of the banyan tree:

Mizo:

Ka phunbungpui dawi ai ka sanna,
Mi Khawih loh, as khawih loh turin,
Thangin lian la, khuanuleng hualin,
I tang zar Piallei a zam tikah,
Seifaten vangkhua rawn din leh nang
English:
Our Banyan tree has the power to predict
Harm caused wither by men or animals could not inflict it
Cause it thrives under the protection of Supreme being That shall be time to restore

Our Principal town as times before

— History of Mizo in Burma, Lalthangliana

Mizo:

Chhak tianga kan sulhnu,
Chumchi leng romei a kai chiai e,
Kan khaw Bungpui a tha her liai e,
Kan khaw Bungpui a that her liai e,
A tang zaran kulva kawl leng maw?
English:
The relic of our past in the east is still standing
With a golden halo around it in misty setting
The Banyan tree would look more majestic
If there are lovely birds frolicking

Aren't they?

— History of Mizo in Burma, Lalthangliana

After reaching present-day Khampat in the Kabaw Valley of Myanmar, the Mizos established themselves there. Three chiefs (Hmâr: Reng) were chosen by the Hmar King (Hmâr: Rengpui) Chawnmanga to lead his realm. Chawnmanga then gave Lersia authority over the kingdom's southern region, Zingthlova over its northern region, and Luopuia over its central region. Then split into three kingdoms that later became chiefdoms.

Mizo:

Sima Lersia, hmara Zingtlhoh,
Khawma laiah Luopui (Luahpuia)
Luopui-in lenbuang a phun,
Thlanga pualrangin tlan e
English:
Lersia in the south, Zingthloh in the north,
and in between Lupui (Luahpuia) ruled,
Luopui planted a banyan tree,

Whereon horbills from the west feed,

— Education and Missionaries in Mizoram

King Lersia Chawngthu (c. 920–970 AD) was considered one of the greatest Kings of the Mizo people, as he established trade with the Shans and Burmans, with his kingdom spanning 40,000 miles.

In the Kabaw Valley, the Mizos and Shans were cooperative due to the common enemity of the Kadu people. Around this time from the 10–13th centuries, the Mizos developed musical instruments. Instruments such as the drum and gong were adopted most likely from the Burmese. It is argued that the Mizos left the Kabaw valley in the 13th century after Tai-Shan tribes invaded Assam in 1229 and the Mongol Empire conquered China, leading to an influx of Shans into the region. In accordance with the Mongol conquest of Burma, Kublai Khan had penetrated the Irrawady Valley down to South Mandaly. Since the Mizos did not adopt a written language or script it is extrapolated by historians that the Mizos did not encounter Kublai Khan's armies and avoided contact with the expedition routes taken. The Mongols replaced the successors of the Nanzhao kingdom and contributed to rise of ancestors of the Tai-speaking modern Shan. The power vacuum left after the withdrawal of the Mongol Empire empowered militant Shan states to begin expansion campaigns in Burma. This would ultimately push the Zo westwards into the Chin Hills.

=== Chin Hills ===
The Mizos arrived in the Chin Hills around the 13th century in successive migratory waves. Their movement southward has been linked to the expansion of Tai-Shan states (Tagaung, Mogaung, Mohnyin, Wuntho, Homalin, Kale, Bahmo, Putai and Khamti), as well as a joint Manipuri invasion of the Kabaw Valley with the Pong kingdom. The rugged highland terrain limited large urban settlements, leading to the formation of small, distinct village communities with unique socio-cultural identities. Over time, the lack of communication between settlements led to the emergence of different dialects, clothing styles, and customs. The ancestors of the Mizos split into two groups. One group passed the tributary of the Chindwin River and established Didim (Tiddim). The tribes in this first group consist of Meitei, Ralleng, Mirawng, Thado, Paihtê, Zo and others to settle on the southern borders of Manipur. The second group moved to the southeastern side. The group halted at Thang Tlang, where tribes such as Ngon, Lente, Tlaichhun and Zagiat settled down. The rest of the second group continued where the tribes of Laizo, Zauhan, Khuangli and Thlan Rawng settled on the southern side of Lêntlang. Mattu and Mara tribes settled in the southern corner, neighbours of the tribes of the Arakan Hills.

In tracing the migration of the tribes, Zawla purports that there were three stages. The tribes originally halted at Lêntlang or Imbuk Tlang. The tribes then moved south towards the Tiddim area and further south towards Falam. The Suktê and the Siyin tribes of Falam forced the tribes to halt further migrations; as a result, the Mizos crossed the Manipur river and occupied Lêngtlang. It is estimated that the Mizos lived in Lêntlang within a range of 200–400 years according to varying historians.

Seipui, one of the chiefdoms that lasted till the 1700s, was strategically located with natural defenses and year-round water sources. It was 20 miles west of Falam and contained ancient stone monuments, speculated to have been erected by the Lusei clan of the Mizo people. In regard to prominent settlements in the Chin Hills, the Lusei tribes mainly settled at Seipui and Khawkâwk. The Râlte settled at Suaipui and Saihmun. The Chawngthu clan settled Sânzawl and Bochung. The Khiangtê at Pelpawl, Bêlmual and Lungchhuan. The Hauhnâr, Chuaungo and Chauhâng settled in the Hauhnar hills. The Ngêntê, Puntê and Partê at Chawnghawih and Sialllam. The Pautu and Khawlring settled in the namesake locations of the Pautu Hills and Khawlring Hills.

By the late 16th century, the Luseis at Seipui engaged in conflict with tribes who resided east of the Manipur River. These wars led to the capture of Chhuahlawma, a Paihtê warrior. Chhuahlawma was adopted by his captors and given a wife. His son, Zahmuaka, would later become the first Lusei chief, marking the beginning of Lusei chieftainship in Mizo history.

=== Movement westward to the Lushai Hills ===
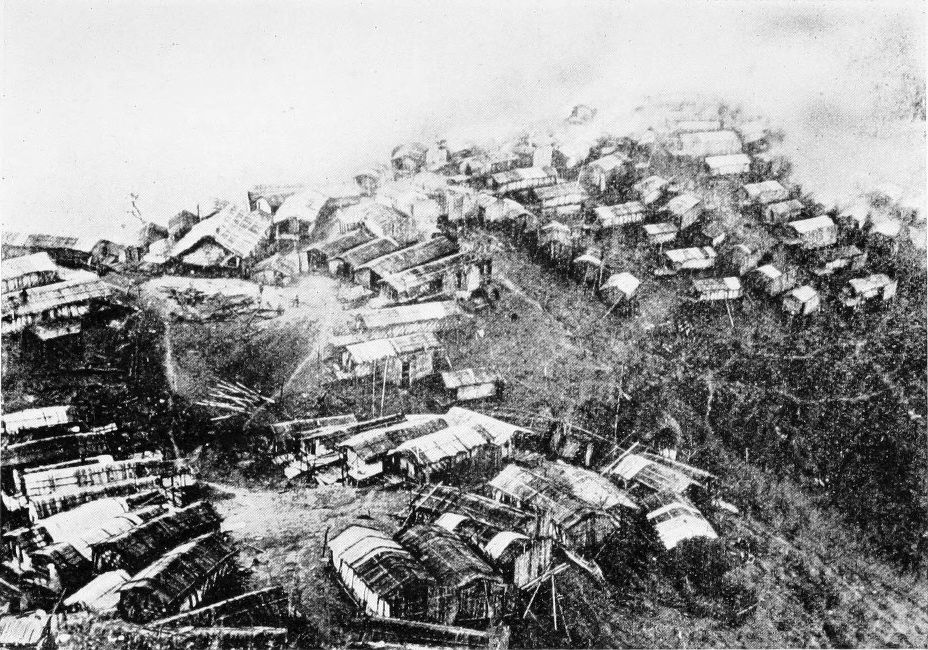
A typical Mizo village during the early 1900s

In the early 14th century, they moved westward to Indo-Burmese border into the Lushai Hills. They built villages and called them by their clan names, such as Seipui, Saihmun, Bochung, Biate, Vangchhia, etc. The hills and difficult terrains of Chin Hills forced division into several villages and ethnic diaspora arose.

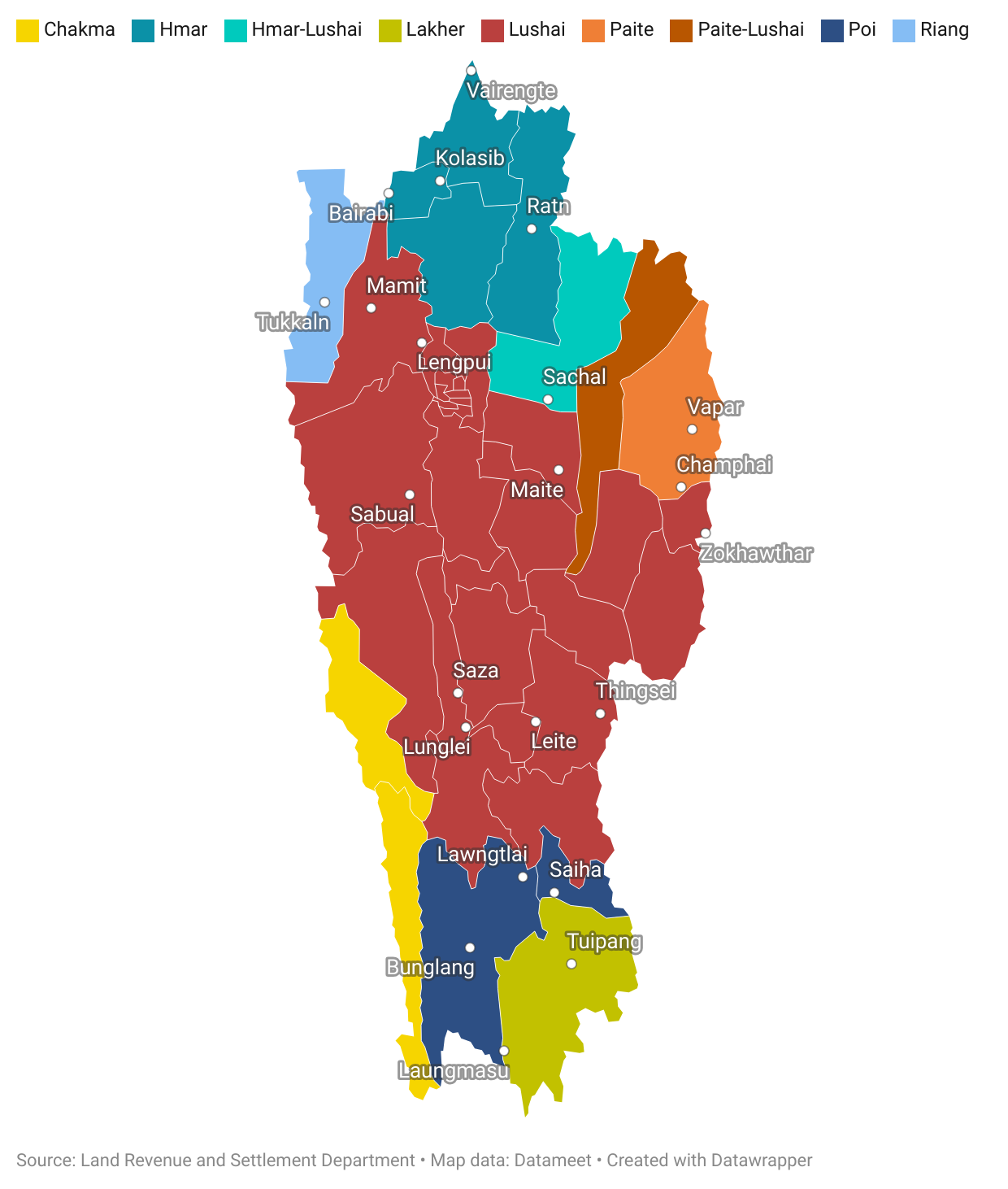
Historical settlements and distribution of Mizo Tribes and Clans in Mizoram State.

It has been proposed by historians that there were waves of migrations of Mizo groups into the present-day territory of Mizoram. The first wave is termed "Old Kukis" and migrated to the Chittagong Hill Tracts and the North Cachar Hills with success in preserving their identity. The second wave, the "New Kukis" were the second wave who were forced to migrate from the Lusei tribes to the west as far as Tripura. This led to confrontations with the British, such as Colonel Frederick George Lister before becoming armed frontiers and stations for the British. The final wave were the Lusei tribes.

==== Establishment of chieftainship ====
The origins of Mizo chieftainship can be traced back to Zahmuaka and his sons, who established the earliest ruling clans. These included the Zadêng, Thangluaha, Ṭhangur, Paliana, Rivunga, and Rokhuma families. The Zadêng chieftains were among the first to migrate, reaching as far as the Chittagong Hill Tracts. Subsequent migrations followed, with the Palian clan moving next, succeeded by the Rokhuma, Rivung, and Thangluaha clans.

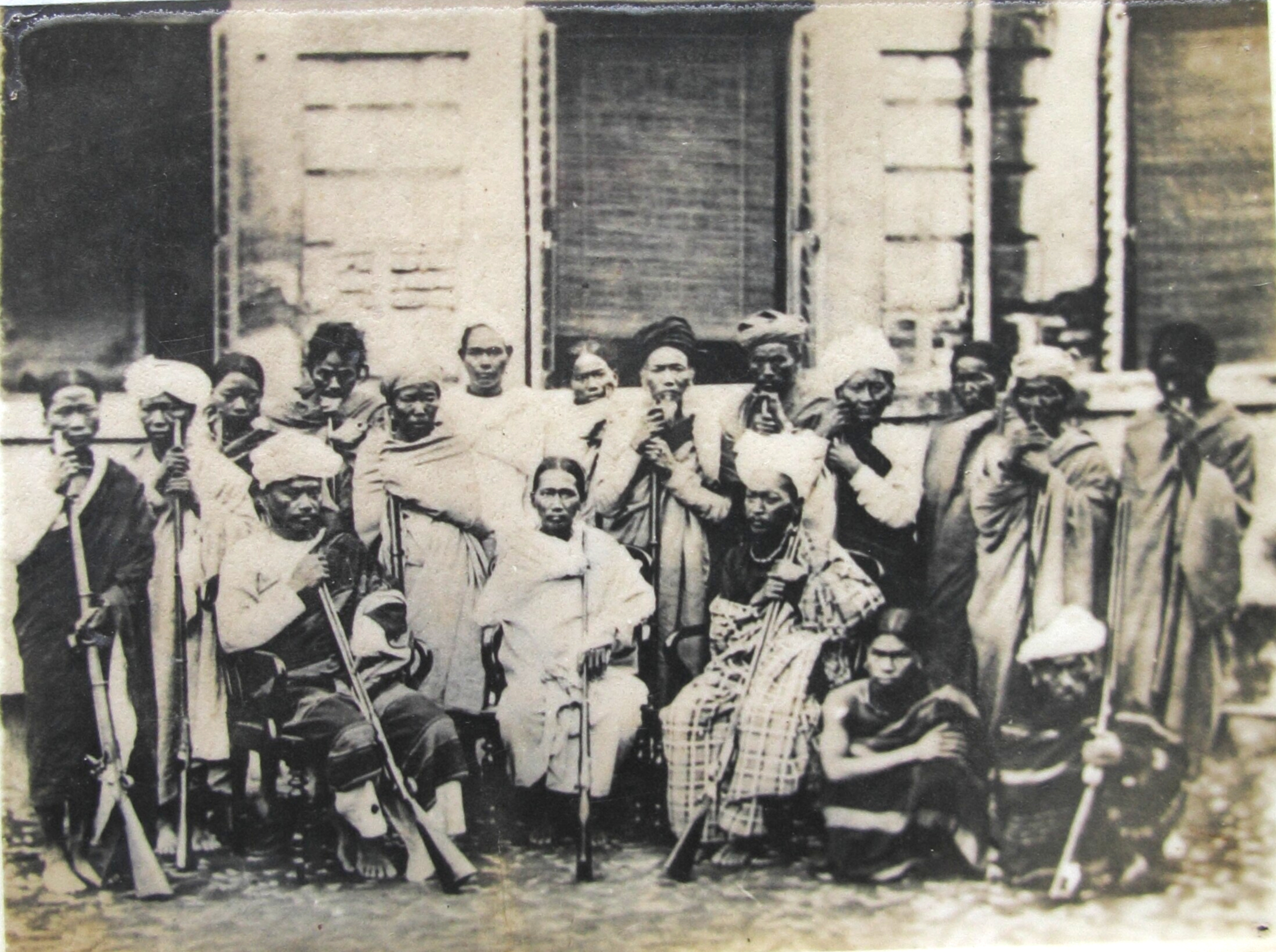
Lushai Chieftains at Calcutta in 1872

By 1890, following the British annexation of the Lushai Hills, colonial records documented the status of these ruling families. The Rokhuma chieftains were assimilated into the predominant Sailo house, leaving little historical trace beyond oral tradition. The Zadêng, Thangluaha, and Palian houses, once powerful, were significantly weakened under British rule, retaining authority over only a few settlements under colonial protection. Meanwhile, Rivung chiefs settled near the Twipra Kingdom, becoming the first Lushai leaders recorded in historical sources as early as 1777. The Ṭhangura house, later known as the Sailo clan, emerged as the most influential ruling group, consolidating power over much of the Lushai Hills frontier.

==== Selesih ====
Selesih was one of the largest and most renowned settlements of the Mizo clans. This settlement was formed around 1720 with the cooperation of seven chiefs who sought to defend against raids from tribes across the Ṭiau River. Sailova's sons Chungnunga and Lianlula, with their sons, established Selesih, which was originally a settlement under Pu Kawlha. The coalition consisted of Lalhlûma, Rohnâa, Lalchêra, Pu Kawlha, Darliankuala and Darpuiliana. Selesih was home to 7000 households and for this reason was also known as Selesih Sangsarih khua (transl. Seven thousand village of Selesih). In terms of modern-day Mizoram, it was situated between Khawbung South and Zawlsei in Champhai district.

Spoken by the Sailo clan, the Lusei dialect emerged as the dominant form of speech within the settlement. As the settlement expanded and mingled with neighbouring clans, the Lusei dialect gained prominence and eventually became the cornerstone of the modern Mizo language.

Early Lushai Chiefs Family Tree

Zahmuaka
Zadeng	Rivunga	Ṭhangura	Paliana	Rokhuma	Thangluaha
Thangmanga	Chawnglula
Chênkuala	Sailova
Chungnunga	Lianlula
Lalhlûma	Rohnâa	Lalchêra	Pu Kawlha	Dârliankuala	Dârpuiliana
Laltuaka	Lallula	Rolûra	Savunga
Lalpuiliana	Lallianvunga	Mângpawrha	Vûta	Lalngûra	Lalzika	Lalbuta
Lalsavunga	Ngûra	Suakpuilala
Vanhnuailiana	Vanpuilala

=== Lallula ===
Chief Lallula left the settlement of Selesih to establish Zopui. Lallula consolidated his power by invading the Râlte settlement of Siakeng and overpowering its chief, known as Mangngula. The Khawlhrings, who were harassed by the Haka tribes, also fled to Lallula's settlement of Zopui. His power would grow and challenge the Zahau clan known as the Thlanrâwn. The Thlanrâwn continued to harass, raid and demand tributes. Lallula hence concocted a plan to end Zahau domination in the Lushai Hills.

Lallula invited the Thlanrâwn chief Thanchhûma to give him tribute and arrange a feast for him. Thanchhûma arrived with a delegation of his upas and his champion pasalṭha, Thanghlianga. The delegates were fed zû and intoxicated. At midnight Lallula beat a gong to signal the ambush. The delegation was killed by the villagers and warriors and Thanchhûma was captured. His pasaltha Thanghlianga escaped to tell the news. Thanchhûma was humiliated, and Lallula immortalised the tale in a hla (transl. song). To avoid reprisal, Lallula migrated westwards away from the Thlanrâwn.

=== Sailo rule ===
Lallula's grandson Lalsavunga was a prominent chief who founded the village of Aizawl and conquered the Thado chief Siakzapau, the Hmârs allied to the Thado and conquered the Hualngo under Zahuata. Lalsavunga's son, Vanhnuailiana was termed the greatest of all under the skies and founded the prominently documented settlement of Tualte, which houses culturally revered warriors such as Vâna Pa and Zampuimanga. Vanhnuailiana subjugated various Lai tribes and conquered land for the Lusei. Lallula's youngest son, Vûta subdued the Zadêng chiefs and fought against the southern Sailos known as Haulong under Chief Lalpuithanga.

The consolidation of the Sailo rule introduced for the first time a ruling tribe that imposed distinct socio-cultural norms on all other tribes. The development of the Sailo confederation continued to attract more and more assimilation and integration of subtribes, who would give up their individual identities and towards a uniform and unified identity. Vanlalchhuanawma argues that the resentment of integration and Sailo rule made non-Lusei Mizos reject the Mizo identity and disperse towards Manipur, Cachar and Tripura. The remaining Mizo tribes under Sailo rule accepted Duhlián ṭawng and assumed the Lusei identity.

=== North–South War ===
The Chhim Leh Hmâr Indo (transl. North-South War) was a war between two factions of the Sailo family. Lallula's descendants were established in the North with his son Vûta. In the South, the descendants of Lallula's cousin, Rolûra (son of Lalchêra), were led by Chief Lalpuithanga.

Tensions began when Vûta began to settle further South in Buanhmun. Vûta established a temporary hut to establish a village around. Lalpuithanga in retaliation moved and settled in Buanhmun. However, Vûta did not hesitate from settling in Buanhmun, leading to Lalpuithanga to leave the settlement back to his hometown of Vanchengte. Vûta as a result of Lalpuithanga's retreat composed a mocking hla (transl. song). This humiliated Lalpuithanga and led to an escalation of tensions between Northern and Southern chiefs.

Vûta, at one point, had to retrieve a gun, his prized possession, which Lalpuithanga had taken. He took his nephew, Thawmvunga, who was a renowned pasalṭha with him. Lalpuithanga's upas were former members of the Zadêng chiefs that Vûta and the northern chiefs had subdued. In revenge, they planned to ambush Vûta. Each of them concealed a stick and Lalpuithanga confronted Vûta about the composition of the song. Vûta claimed to mean different lyrics in an attempt to defuse the situation. However, his nephew Thawmvunga was angered and swung his dao (transl. sword) around above the heads of the delegates to subdue them. Thawmvunga took the gun from them and left with Vûta. Lalpuithanga's upas chased down Vûta and Thawmvunga and attempted to wrestle the gun away from them. In the ensuing chaos, Thawmvunga took out his knife and attempted to saw off the gun and took off. As they ran, Lalpuithanga's men shot a volley at Vûta and Thawmvunga which missed but signalled a declaration of war.

The war led to constant raids between the North and South chiefs. The war led to the Khawlung massacre, a brutal raid in the middle of the night, which became immortalized as a song. Many women and children were taken captive. The war ceased with the onset of the mautam famine.

==== Old Tualte ====
The exact date of Tualte's establishment remains uncertain, though its earliest recorded acknowledgement dates back to 1861. At that time, it comprised approximately 1,000 households and supported a substantial population. Tualte was home to several prominent figures in Mizo history, including Pasalṭha Vana Pa (Thangzachhinga), Chawngduma, Zampuimanga, Keikawla, and Tawkthiala, among others. Unlike settlements such as Selesih, which were governed by multiple chiefs, Tualte operated under the singular authority of Vanhnuailiana, whose father, Lalsavunga, was among the wealthiest chiefs in Mizo history. The decline of Tualte coincided with the devastating impact of the mauṭam famine.

=== Lushai Expedition ===
On 31 December 1871, a village in Cachar was raided by 200 Lushai warriors, with 25 villagers killed and 37 taken prisoner. The same day, a tea estate in Alexandrapur was destroyed in a joint raid of Chief Savunga and Chief Bengkhuaia. James Winchester was visiting the estate with his five-year-old daughter Mary when the raid occurred. He was killed by the warriors and his daughter was taken captive. The taking of Mary Winchester prompted outrage and encouraged a punitive expedition into the Lushai Hills.

Two columns were established: the Chittagong (Southern) column and the Cachar (Northern) column. The Cachar Column defeated the villages of Pâwibâwia after attempting to cross his territory, leading him to side with Lalburha, the target of the expedition. The force occupied his village of Selâm but failed to secure his submission, instead continuing towards Lalburha.

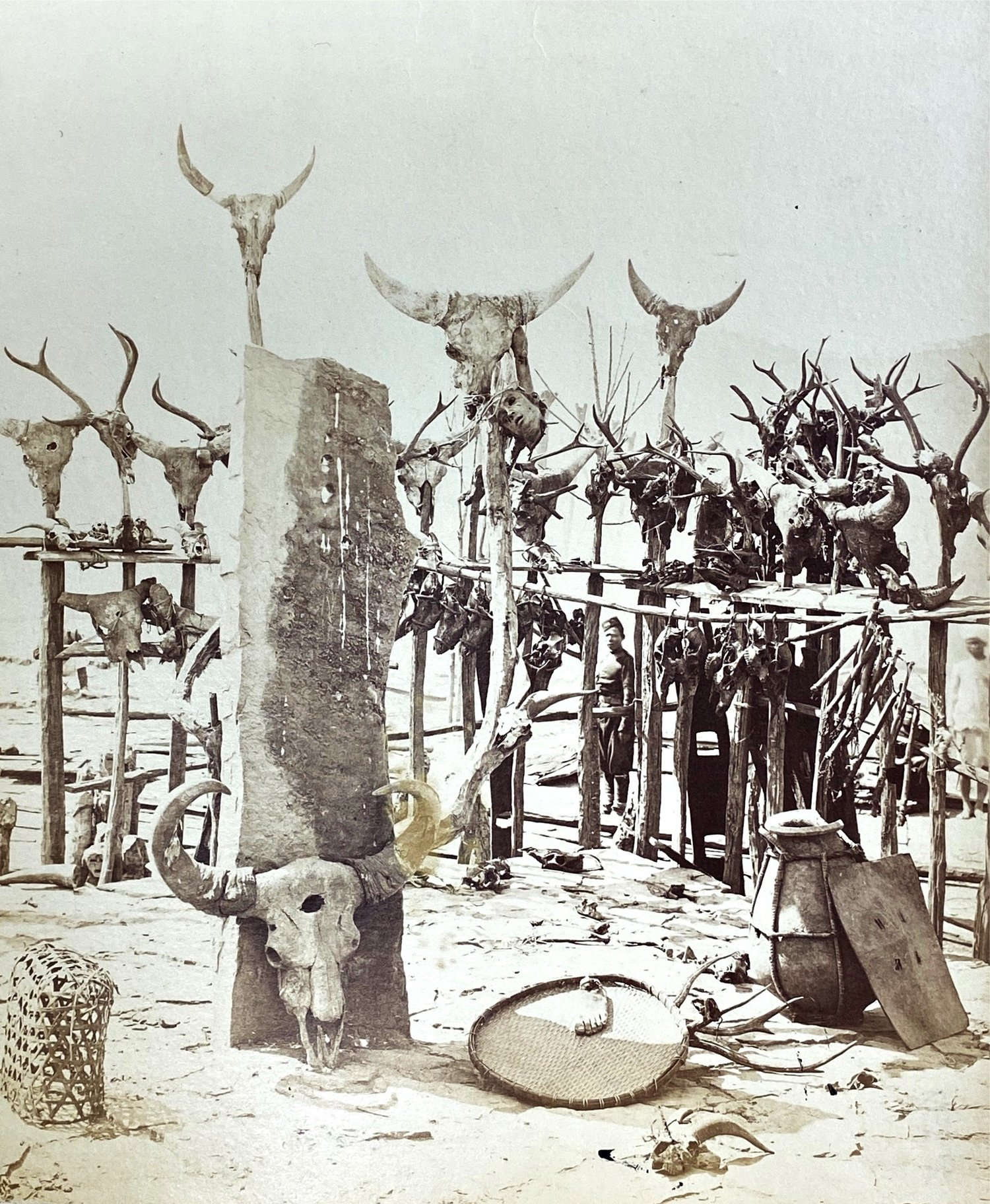
Tomb of Chief Vanhnuailiana during the Expedition, photographed by R.G. Woodthorpe

On 17 February 1872, the Cachar Column entered Lalburha's village, which had been besieged and abandoned. Lalburha had been attacked by the Suktê tribes and successfully defended with heavy losses. He deserted the village and had burnt many buildings to the ground. Only the tomb of Vanhnuailiana had been untouched and investigated. The Cachar column made peace with Lalburha's mother, Rolianpuii, in a neighbouring village and returned to Cachar.

The Chittagong Column focused on punishing Savunga and Bengkhuaia. The force fought with Vanlula, who refused to let the force cross his territory, leading to his village being overrun and Vanlula burning it down. T.H. Lewin's ally, Rothangpuia joined the force but was not able to be used diplomatically due to bad history with the Sailo and Howlongs. Rothangpuia however, was influential via marriage to the northern Howlong chiefs. Lewin assigned Subadar Mohamed Azim of the Chittagong Frontier Police to accompany Rothangpuia to negotiate the release of Mary Winchester under Bengkhuaia and to free the other captives to avoid an attack. Mary Wincester was recovered safely and negotiations began with the two chiefs. On 29 January 1872, the Chiefs agreed to submit to the column and release all captives from the raids. In February, Lewin facilitated an oath of friendship with Bengkhuaia and Savunga. Lalburha, who had avoided the Northern Column, submitted to Lewin as well.

=== East–West Wars ===
The East–West War was a conflict between two descendant factions of Lallula beginning in 1873. It concerned the western chiefs in the family of Suakpuilala and the eastern chiefs in the family of Vanhnuailiana. Tensions had been raised due to Suakpuilala's son, Khalkam, desiring the hand of Tuali, who was to be betrothed to Vanhnuialiana's son Liankhama. Lalzika, a chief with vengeance for being denied Suakpuilala's sister, Banaitangi joined Liankhama in the war. The war lasted until 1867.

The East–West War erupted once more due to closely settled villages and disputing claims to jhum sites. Suakpuilala's son, Lianphunga cooperated with Lalzika in raiding the village of Pugrying. Khalkam also entered into a dispute with Pâwibâwia. The western coalition consisted of Suakpuilala, Khalkam and Lianphunga, while the eastern coalition consisted of Liankhama, Lalburha and Pâwibâwia. The war ended in 1881 with the onset of the mautam famine. Pâwibâwia, Khalkam and Lalhleia met and made peace and agreed to procure food together from Cachar.

=== Anti-Sailo Rebellion ===
The Anti-Sailo Rebellion (Mizo lal sawi) was a movement of the Mizo people to dethrone their chiefs. The rebellion began in the Eastern Lushai Hills in the village of Vûta's son, Lalkhama. In the village of Hmawngkawn, ruled by Chief Vanphunga, the villagers rounded him up with his upas and made them hold burning firebrands in their hands. They took the hostages and made them extinguish the firebrand in a water trough, making the chief recite that his chieftainship is extinguished and the upas that they will never align or support the chief ever again.

Vûta's son began to lose their authority over their people as they continued to be de-throned. Vanphunga fled to the western chief Lianphunga to restore order and to take anything he wanted as compensation. Lianphunga arrived at Hmawngkawn with Lalhluma, where they were threatened not to enter or they would be shot. Lalhluma declared his name and stepped over the entrance, where one shot was made but missed him. The individuals surrendered and accepted chieftainship, hence ending the Anti-Sailo rebellion and restoring the rule of the dethroned chiefs.

=== Chin-Lushai Expedition ===
In 1888, Lieutenant John Fraser Stewart was assigned to survey the Rangamati border for road construction. Stewart was granted a party of sepoys to accompany him. On 3 February 1888, Stewart and his party were attacked by 200–300 Mizo warriors. Stewart fought back but was wounded in the chest by a bullet and died instantly. Stewart's body was recovered in bamboo with his head missing.

An investigation revealed Chief Hausata had been ordered by his father-in-law, Zahuata, to bring him heads as an apology for a marital dispute with his daughter Ngundawngi. Hence, Stewart's unguarded encampment was an opportune raid. Within 10 days of the murder of Captain Stewart, a British allied chief, Pakuma Rani, was raided by Vûta's sons, Nikama, Lunliana and Kairûma. Furthermore, the village in the Chengri Valley was raided by Lianphunga and his brother Zahrâwka, leading to the death of 101 villagers and the capture of 91 individuals.

The Lushai Expedition of 1888 was arranged against Hausata. However, intelligence from Darbilhi, a British ally, revealed that Hausata had already died and been buried with Stewart's gun, with the heads of the party given to another chief known as Paona. When the column arrived at Hausata's village, the Lushais burned it down and deserted it.The guides identified Hausata's house and located his grave. Underneath Hausata's robed body was Stewart's gun. Another expedition arranged against Lianphunga was organized. However, when one column under Daly made contact with Lianphunga, he felt unfit to perform an arrest and allowed Lianphunga to return to his village in promise to cooperate with Skinner who was arriving soon. As a result, Lianphunga fled the settlement.

=== Lushai Rising ===
The Chin-Lushai Expedition annexed the Lushai Hills and the Chin Hills and established several outposts. Captain Herbert Richard Browne was assigned political officer of the North-Lushai Hills. His first decision was to depose Lianphunga and Zahrâwka of their chieftainship. However, new British policies on taxes and hunting restrictions led Khalkam to break his oath of fealty. Khalkam held a meeting with his brothers and plotted a revolt against British occupation.

On 9 September 1890, Captain Browne was ambushed on his journey between Aizawl and Changsil. Browne was stabbed in the arm with three severe wounds and excessive bleeding. Browne died 15 minutes after being brought to Changsil post. Khalkam subsequently besieged Fort Aijal and overran the British. A relief force was dispatched to relieve Fort Aijal and Changsil. The force provided 200 men of the Surma Valley Military police under A.C. Tytler and Lieutenant R.R. Swinton. However, while navigating the river, the party was ambushed and Swinton was killed in action. Browne's successor, R.B. McCabe, was successful in curbing the resistance and secured Khalkam's surrender on 23 November. Khalkam, Lianphunga and Thanghula were sent to Hazaribagh jail, where the former two committed suicide.

Later on in 1892, Chief Zakapa revolted against the British. The investigation showed that superintendent of the South Lushai Hills, Charles Stewart Murray had demanded two girls as sexual companions for himself and his assistant Mr Taylor. After failing to procure women, Murray threatened his wife would be taken from him to fulfil the demand. Zakapa left and stayed with Lalthuama. Murray interrupted the meeting and in private conversation reiterated the demands. After the conversation, Murray began to burn down the rice stock of the village by setting the granary on fire. The Lushais became hostile and fired upon Murray and his party. Murray escaped leaving behind his money, guns, and men. On 16 March 1892 C.S. Murray was removed as superintendent and replaced with John Shakespear. Zakapa's allies were captured but liberally treated.

McCabe would visit Lalburha's village who had refused to supply 100 coolies. The British column occupied the village which led to Lalburha burning down the houses and trapping them. However the British maintained their volley and scattered the attackers. The operations against Lalburha would last from 3 March 1892 – 17 March 1892. Lalburha fled into exile as a fugitive as a result. Lalburha's ally, Pâwibâwia was captured on 14 April after storming his village at a climb over 2000 feet. After the capture of all Eastern Lushai chiefs by 8 June 1892, the chiefs agreed to pay house tax and supply coolies to the British.

=== Colonial era ===
The Mizo people under British rule experienced the establishment of Fort Aijal now Aizawl. Captain Granville Henry Loch expanded the fort and built roads, the parade ground, and permanent stone structures as opposed to temporary thatched shelters. The colonial era saw the arrival of Welsh Presbyterian Missionaries, most prominently James Herbert Lorrain and Frederick William Savidge who were funded by the Arthington Aborigines Mission. Lorrain and Savidge discovered that the Mizos lacked a writing system and spent four years learning the Mizo language. In 1898, they introduced the Mizo alphabet via the roman script. The Mizos experienced the mautam famine once more but this time as British subjects. The British government began to incentivise hunting down the rat population and distributed food relief. Food was distributed as a loan to be repaid with money or labour in the future. The labourers were used to develop Aizawl into a city by building new infrastructure, instutitons and waterworks. The church in Mizoram also distributed food and guaranteed loans for Mizos to procure food and took in orphans. In this period, there was a rise in Christianity among the Mizo people.

In World War One, 2,000 Mizo men were marched out into the 27th Indian Labour Corps under four companies. After World War One, the interwar period saw the first attempts at political representation under Telela Râlte but were suppressed by Superintendent Neville Edward Parry. In 1931, Major Anthony Gilchrist McCall was assigned superintendent of the Lushai Hills and introduced significant reforms. He formed the ten point code, the village welfare committee system, the chief's durbar and invested into the development of the Lushai Hills cottage industry. These reforms were introduced to prepare the tribes into being formed into a new crown colony known as the Crown Colony of Eastern Agency Scheme but was dropped with the onset of World War II.

In World War Two, Superintendent Anthony McCall implemented the Total Defence Scheme (TDS) to combat the Japanese advance into India. He secured the loyalty of 300 chiefs and made an oath with them to the Union Jack. In 1944, the British formed the Lushai Scouts under Major Jack Longbottom to be part of V Force.

The first political party the Mizo Union (originally, Mizo commoners union) was founded on 12 April 1946 by R. Vanlawma. The Mizo Union faced internal rivalry in the direction of the political future of the Mizo people. The Mizo Union's left wing focused on membership into the Indian Union. The Mizo Union Right Wing advocated for alternative political directions such as the Professor Coupland Crown Colony scheme to carve out a British colony for the hill tribes until self-determination. The Mizo people would develop their second party, the United Mizo Freedom Organisation, which would largely advocate for a union with Burma. However, the UMFO would lack the support it needed to prevent joining the Indian Union.

=== Post-Independence India ===
The Mizo people did not celebrate the Indian Independence Day and no Indian flags were hoisted. This was because rival factions of the Mizo Union threatened violence if a celebration of Indian integration were to be carried out.

After Indian independence, the democratic change in the administrative setup of Mizoram led to an anti-chief movement. The feeling was widespread against the autocratic chiefs and for the Mizo Union. In 1955, at a meeting of representatives of various Mizo villages held in Aizawl, the demand arose for a separate hills state. The local people felt they had been ill-served by the Assam Government during the Mautam famine.

The Mizo Union abolished chieftainship in 1954. The same year, the Lushai Hills were renamed to the Mizo district.

When in 1960 the government introduced Assamese as the official language of the state, there were many protests against the Official Language Act of 1961.

=== Mizo National Front uprising ===
The mautam famine took place once more in 1959. The Mizo National Famine Front was formed and distributed food relief while spreading nationalist messages and campaigning on the slogan "Mizoram for Mizos". On 28 October 1961, the MNFF transitioned into a political party and was rechristened as the Mizo National Front.

On 1 March 1966, the Mizo National Front, led by Laldenga, declared independence from India. The MNF launched Operation Jericho, which targeted the posts of the Assam Rifles, the Aizawl treasury and other key buildings. The Indian Government responded with the bombing of Aizawl. On 5 March 1966, the bombing of Aizawl saw the aerial firing of a water reservoir at Tuikhuahtlang. Further incendiary bombs saw the destruction of circuit houses and the burning down of buildings.

The Indian government designated Mizoram as a union territory on 21 January 1972. Laldenga, the president of the Mizo National Front, signed a peace accord in 1986 with the Government of India, stating Mizoram was an integral part of India. Pu Laldenga came to the ministry in the interim government, which was formed in coalition with Congress in 1987. The statehood of Mizoram was proclaimed on 20 February 1987.

== Traditional society ==
Traditional Mizo society consisted of organized chiefdoms. Each village was self-determining, self-governing, self-contained and had to be self-sufficient. The Mizos were traditionally a semi-nomadic people who would cultivate hillside slopes for a few years and then migrate the whole village to another location. Vanlaldika argues that the semi-nomadic lifestyle of traditional Mizo society prevented the development of complex societies and permanent houses which could be constructed into larger dwellings.

The chief was traditionally the supreme administrative authority of each village. The chief was liable to aid the villagers during difficult times and punish offenders who broke customary laws. The privileges of a chief was typically the ability to order voluntary labour to build his house and collect certain taxes such as fathang (transl. rice paddy tax), Sachhiah (transl. meat tax) and Chhiah (transl. salt tax) and honey.

Other officials of a village were the Upas (transl. Council of Elders), who would assist the chief. The Tlangau (transl. village crier) was the individual tasked with declaring the chief's orders. The Thirdêng (transl. blacksmith) was in charge of repairing tools and weapons of the villagers. The Puithiam (transl. village priest) performed sacrifices to spirits to appease them and to carry out customary rites. There are two types of puithiam, a bawlpu (transl. medicine man) supervised in illness and offered sacrifices to spirits; a sadâwt was a more traditional priest who resided over ceremonies. The Ramhual (transl. expert jhum cultivators) were individuals given priority selection on farming plots based on their knowledge of selecting the next farming junction. The Zalen were a group of individuals who were exempt from paying fathang to the chief as it was their duty to lend their rice to the chief during difficulties or emergencies. The Khawchhiar (transl. village writer) was established after British colonisation. They were in charge of keeping records of populations, guns, statistics and coolie labours for the British.

Mizo chiefdoms relied on the barter system. The general medium of exchange between individuals would be the sial (transl. gayal). The sial would also be the measurement unit of fines and compensation. Another unit of wealth was elephant tusks. Traditional Mizo society also participated in raiding and headhunting. Raiding were a way for Mizos to procure rare resources such as steel and manpower. Manpower was a crucial factor in the success of a chiefdom as men were put to labour and women could raise the prestige of the chief by becoming concubines.

The Mizos also operated a traditional system of slavery or indentured labour known as the Bawi system. A bawi was only owned by a chief and could move to another chief freely into their service and even attain marriage under the chief. Inpuichhung bawi (transl. in-house slave) were bawis who were vulnerable during a crisis and decided to become indentured to the chief typically consisting of individuals such as widows, orphans and the sickly in a form of serfdom and living with their chief. Inhrang bawi (transl. separate house slave) was a bawi who was married off by their chief and permitted to live separately with their family but still retained in service. Chemsen bawi (transl. red-knife slave) refers to an individual who surrenders to the chief after becoming a murderer. By clinging to the post of the chief's house the family of the murderer's victim could not harm them anymore and the chief would become their master. Tuklut bawi (transl. promised slave) is an individual from another village who during a raid joined the winning side or deserted their village. Lastly, a sal was a literal captive slave from a raid. Unlike a bawi, a sal was personal property of their captors and could be exchanged freely for other captives or loot.

== Culture ==
The Mizo culture is diverse and rich due to the various tribes and clans. After the 19th century, it has been heavily based on Christianity—the main festival of the Mizos is Krismas. Despite valuing traditional practices and culture, many aspects have undergone changes with westernization. Recently, there have been attempts to revive traditional practices such as Chapchâr Kût.

=== Language ===
The modern Mizo people speak the Mizo language, a member of the Kuki-Chin languages in the Tibeto-Burman language family group. Mizo is one of the official languages of Mizoram, along with English. Like the Chinese language, Mizo is a tonal language. There are four tones, high, low, rising and falling.

==== Writing system ====
It is commonly believed that Mizoram and the Mizo people lacked a writing system before the arrival of the British, though this claim is only partially accurate. Mizo folklore recounts a tale of a lost script once written on parchment. According to the legend, the parchment was consumed by a mad hound, leaving the Mizo people without a script for much of their history. While these are myths and not verifiable historical facts, they have sparked speculation among historians about the story's origin. Some historians suggest the tale was never intended to be taken literally; instead, the "mad hound" might symbolize a foreign ruler or authoritative figure who invaded the Mizos and destroyed their records. This aligns with historical accounts of invading forces erasing the cultural and intellectual heritage of the conquered. For example, the Meitei people (Manipuris) recount the burning of the Puyas—their religious texts—by a Hindu king, illustrating a similar pattern of cultural erasure.

Currently, in Mizoram, the Roman script is used to write the Mizo language using the Hunterian transliteration. The Mizo language can be read by 91.3% of the population of Mizoram, making the state to have the highest literacy rates in India and the first at 100% in 2025.

=== Names ===
Traditionally, Mizo names were mononyms. Names are unisex with suffix identification for gender.

=== Art and craft ===
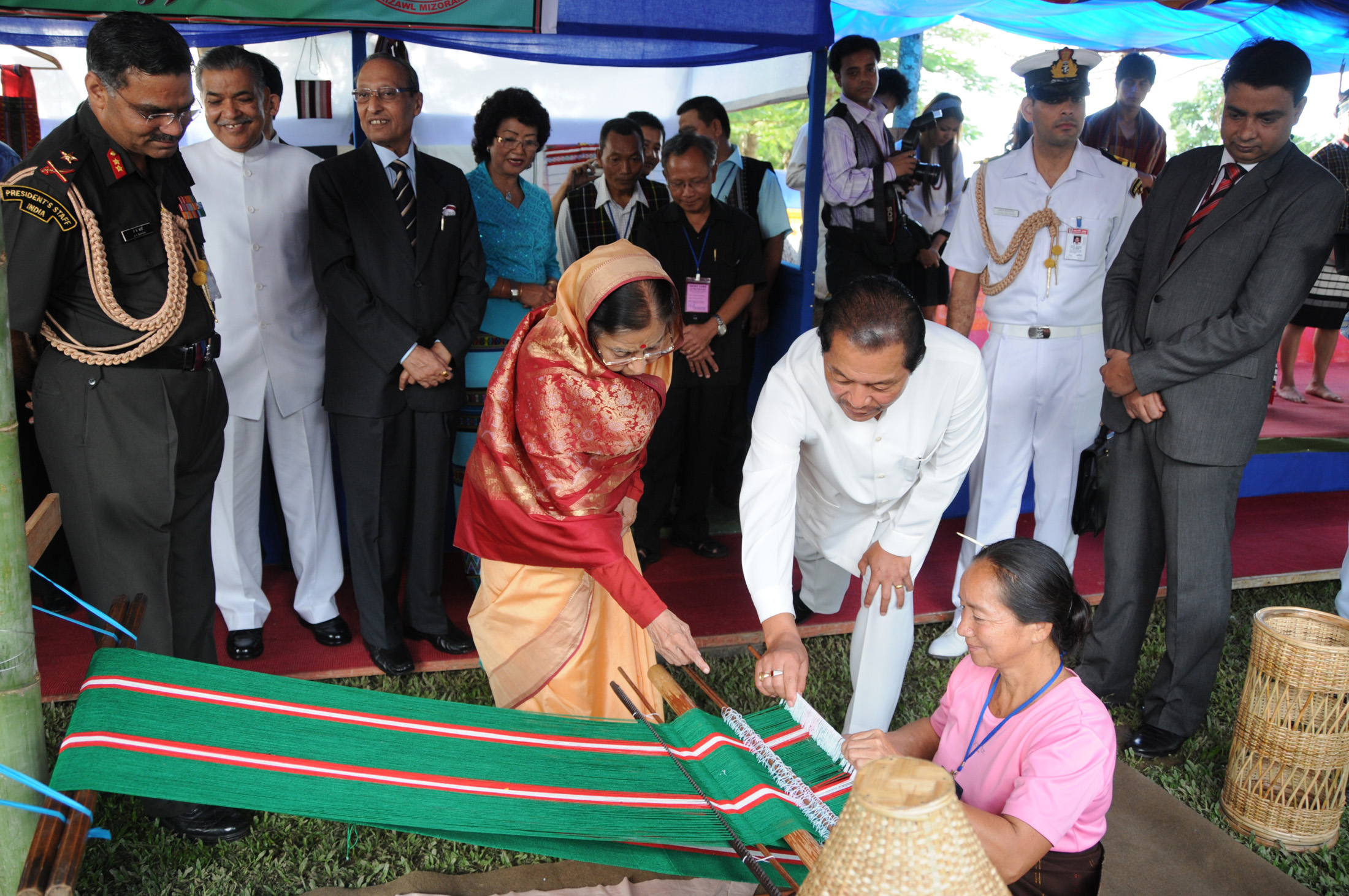
Handloom and handicraft exhibition at Aizawl, Mizoram.

A wide range of art and craft products are sold at Mizoram's markets. The main subset of craftwork is textiles, bamboo, cane, and basketry. Many women engage in weaving and basketry. The most common bamboo products are khumbeu (a cap), tea tray, cane bag, tea coaster and brooms. Outside of bamboo products, Mizoram is well known for traditional dresses weaved from local artisans such as the puan which now introduces silk into its design.

=== Archaeology ===
In Mizoram, megaliths have been erected from pre-colonial times consisting of dolmen and menhir monuments.

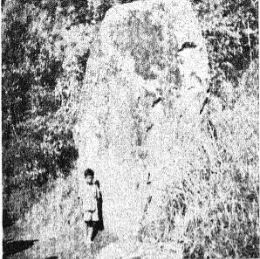
Mangkhaia Lung

Mangkhaia Lung (transl. Mangkhaia stone) is a monument to the chief Mangkhaia. Mangkhaia was a hsitorically revered Râlte chief who was captured by the Chuango tribes before being ransomed. However, on his return to his chiefdom he was killed by Vanpuia who did not receive any part of the ransom. Mangkhaia's father constructed the monument with figurines of human heads and figures which is now located in Champhai.

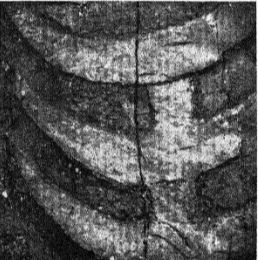
Mangkhaia monument, inscriptions of gayal horns

Lungphunlian is a village named after the six large menhir monuments of varying sizes. Varying perspectives argue about the possibility of other tribes such as Meitei, Reang and Vangchhia erecting some of the menhirs.

Sikpui Lung (transl. Sikpui stone) is a big stone lying flat on the grounds in Zotê village. It was erected initially by Hmâr tribespeople who inhabited the former site in 1918.

Sibuta Lung (transl. Sibuta stone) is 4 metres high and one of the largest menhirs in Mizoram located in Tachhip. The stone is associated with the infamy of Chief Sibuta and the erection of the monument even sacrificed a person in the foundation before it was pulled vertical.

Darthiangi Lung (transl. Darthiangi stone) is a monument erected for the love story between Darthiangi and Chertuala in Farkawn village. The monument is unique for adopting the figure of a woman as an inscription.

Ridawpi Lung (transl. Ridawpi stone is located in Sabual and is five feet tall weighing 2 tonnes. It is the memorial stone of Chief Lallula's daughter Ridawpi. The monument bears inscriptions of men and women with pipes.

Other megaliths in Mizoram are Lalruanga Lung, Chhura Lung, Lungvando and Lallula Lung.

=== Cuisine ===
Mmost non-vegetarian dishes among the Mizos were traditionally served on banana leaves, though this is now largely reserved for special occasions. When preparing cuisine, Mustard oil is commonly used along with other spices such as garlic, ginger, and chili. Mizo cuisine tends to be milder than that of many other regions. Rice is the staple food, which they pair with both vegetarian and non-vegetarian curries. Bamboo shoots gives a distinct aroma or scent to many dishes.

One typical Mizo dish is bai, mixed vegetables combined with fermented pork fat.

=== Dance ===
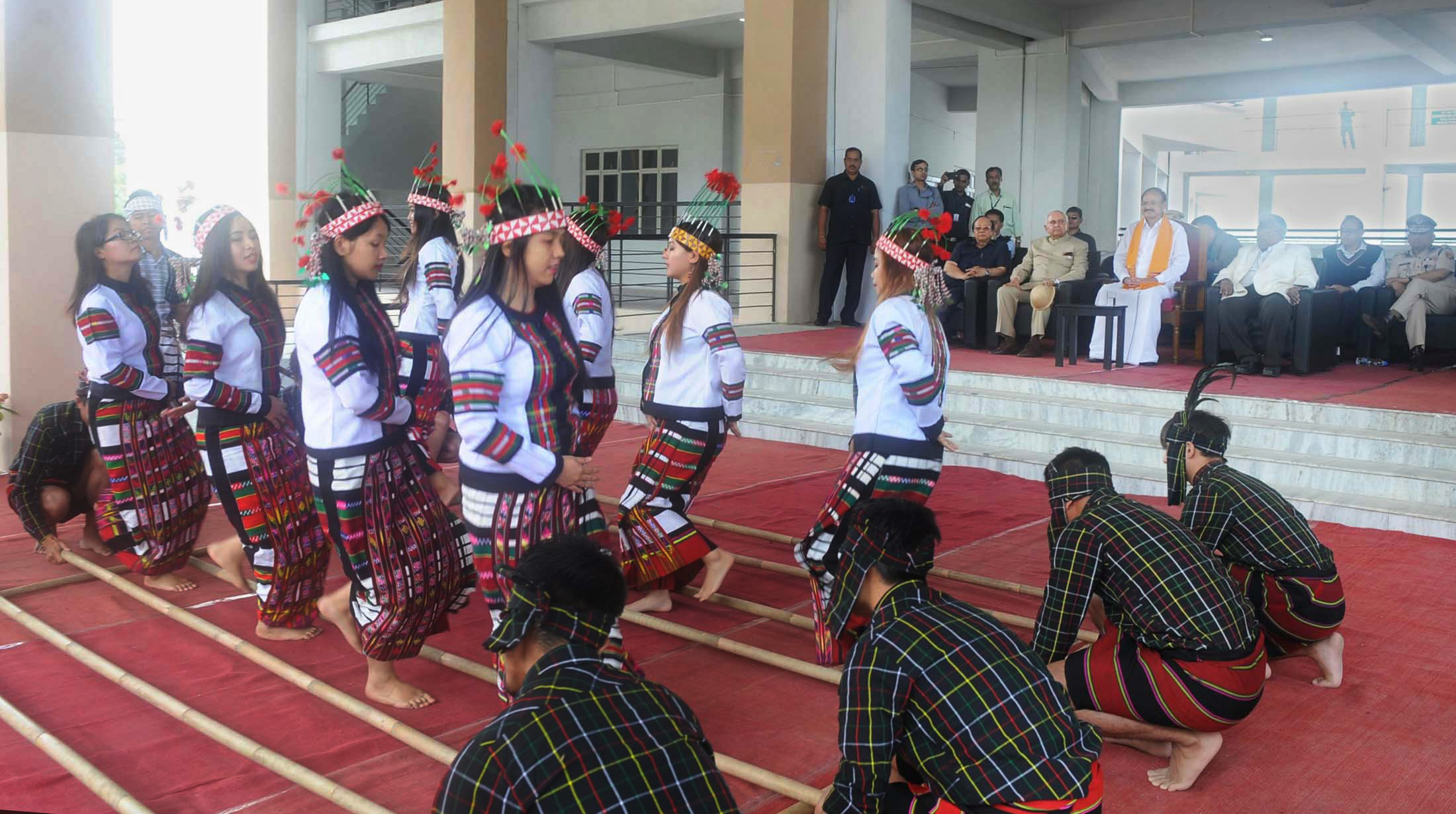
Cheraw dance with traditional Mizo attire

Cheraw dance, also referred to as the bamboo dance, is considered to be the oldest dance of the Mizos, dating back until the 1st century while the Mizos were still in Chhînlung, China before their great migration. The dance is now performed in almost all festivals and occasions. Other dances include Chheih Lam, Khual Lam, Chai Lam, Tlang Lam, and Sarlamkai. Lam in Mizo means "dance."

=== Musical instruments ===
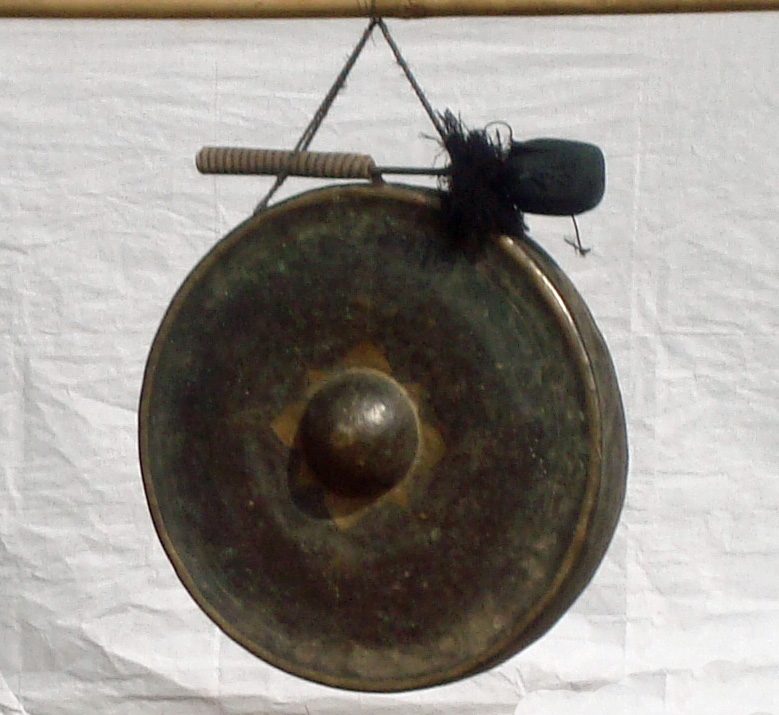
Darkhuang, also known as Zamluang or Jamluang

Mizos have been using different musical instruments. They can broadly be divided into three: striking instruments, wind instruments, and stringed instruments.

- Striking instruments include the Khuang (drum), Dár (gong), Darkhuang/Zamluang (large brass drum), Darbu (three-note gong), Darmang (small gong) and Seki (hollow horns).
- Wind instruments include the Rawchhem (bagpipe-like instrument), Tumphit, Tawtawrawt (bamboo trumpet), Phenglawng (bamboo flute), and Hnahtum (leaf).
- Stringed instruments include the Ṭingṭang (pronounced treeng-trang, guitar), Lemlawi (harp), and Tuium Dar (three strings with unique notes each).

Khuang is the only Mizo traditional musical instrument that is popularly used in the present day. In the olden days, Khuang had no role in religious functions; but today, the use of Khuang is a must in every church service.

=== Mizo poetry ===
Hla (transl. song/poem) is a traditional folksong tradition of the Mizo people. According to K. Zawla, the Mizos had no folksongs until they settled in the Len Range in Burma. J. Malsawma similarly argues that the Mizos and their subclans did not possess any folksongs at their early settlements of Seipui, Suaipui, Khawkawk and Sânzawl. Simple verses were composed during the early migration of the Mizos into the current territory of Mizoram when they crossed the Run river. Archaeological investigations have revealed Mizo settlements in Burma possessed brass gongs which implies that folksongs must have been composed much earlier than previously argued.

Mizo folksongs are characterised as being songs of individuals, songs of musical instruments, song of the modulation of the voice, cradle songs and religious invocations or incantations. The principle theme of Mizo folksongs centre around a theme of love. Folksongs were also sung in the context of war and hunting. Folksongs associated with hunting were known as hlado.

=== Traditional clothing ===
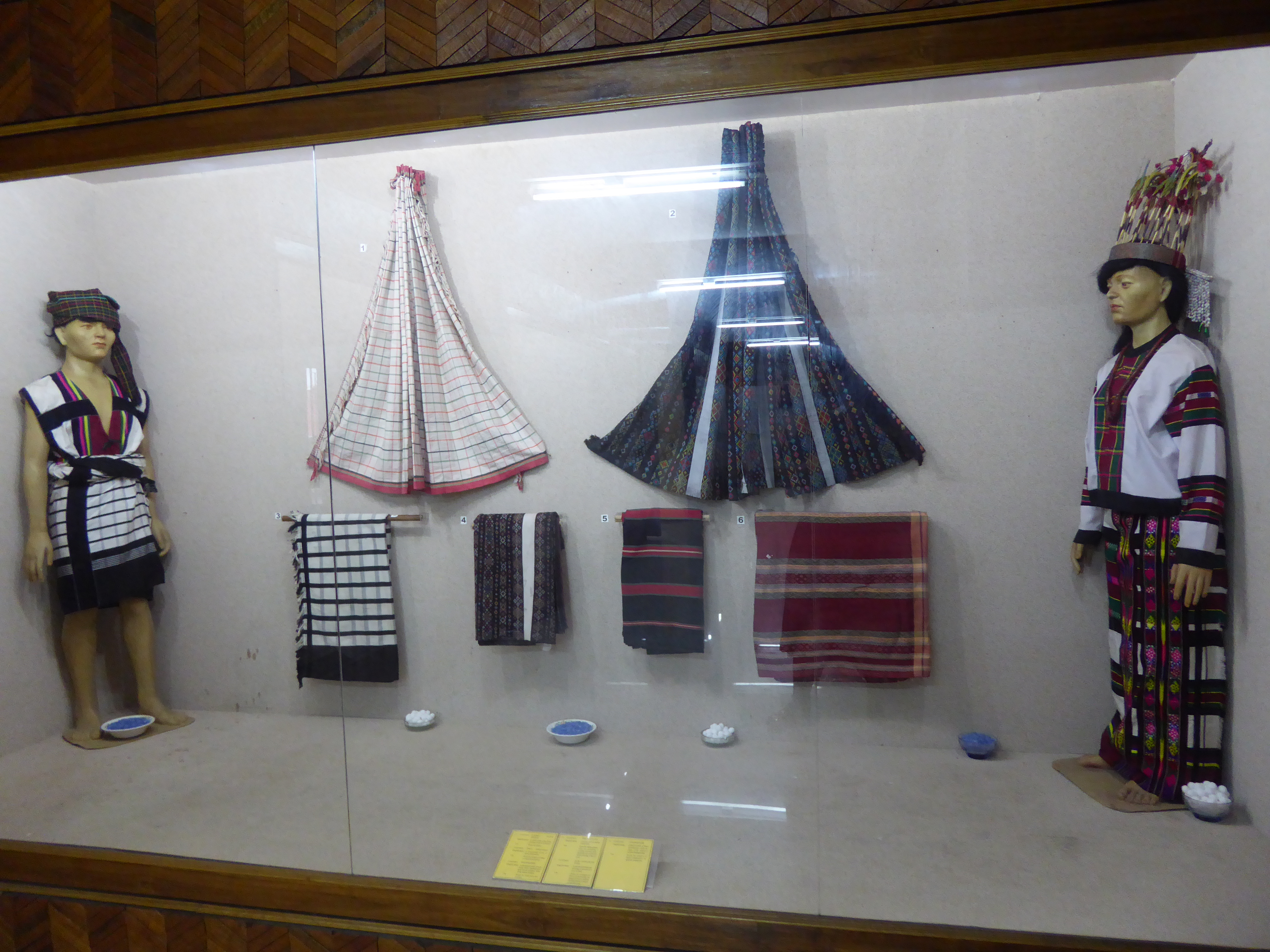
Mizo traditional attire showcased in the Mizoram State Museum.

A typical Mizo traditional attire for men comes with a big puan that varies colors, and different style of wearing it. They wear a shorter puan that are above the knees at the bottom. In order to protect themselves from the heat during the summer, they are often seen with clothing around their waists and a type of turban known as chawn on their heads.

There are numerous Mizo women's traditional outfits. The most popular one is the Puan. There are four types of Puan: Ngotekherh (puanhruih), Puanchei (Puanlaisen), Puanngo and Puanrin. The traditional blouse is called Kawrchei. It is hand woven from cotton stuff. When dancing, the blouse is frequently paired with puanchei. These have typically vivid colors and chequered patterns.

=== Social customs ===
==== Marriage ====
Mizo marriage customs are deeply rooted in traditional practices, though they have evolved over time, especially with the influence of Christianity. The process typically begins with Mangkhawn, a formal proposal where the groom's family sends an elder, known as the Palai, to the bride's home to ask for her hand in marriage. Once the proposal is accepted, the groom's family pays a bride price to the bride's family, a practice that underscores the social contract of marriage in Mizo society. After the ceremony, the bride moves into the groom's house, marking her permanent entry into his family.

==== Tlâwmngaihna ====
Tlâwmngaihna (t͡lɔmŋaɪʔna) is a social code of conduct in Mizo culture that has no direct translation into English. Tlâwmngaihna is a moral code held by the Mizos which encompasses being courteous, considerate, helpful, unselfish and ready to help others despite any considerable inconvenience to oneself. It has been summarised as placing the collective beyond the self. Typical examples of Tlâwmngaihna were to helping the sick and vulnerable, volunteering to do jhum work for others, fetching water from difficult terrain or extinguishing fires. Chatterjee argues that Tlâwmngaihna allowed the tribes to live in close homogeneity.

A saying in the Mizo culture goes:

Sem sem dam dam,
ei bil thi thi

which can be interpreted to:

Those who hoard will perish
but who share will live

This saying was important during the 1958 famine in the Mizo Hills. The principle was kept alive amongst Mizo society via the Young Mizo Association founded in 1935. The YMA encouraged volunteerism in matters such as road building, landslides or funerals. Tlâwmngaihna being core to Mizo society is not a written code and is informally managed and not enforced. The most relevant example of a tlawmngai (transl. follower of Tlâwmngaihna) was Taitesena, who was self-sacrificing and courageous.

Another part of the Mizo's tlâwmngaihna is the Nghah Loh Dawr shops. In Mizoram, it is quite typical to see sheds or small shops by the side of the road where vegetables and fruits are stored with signs stating the prices of things, but no merchant in sight. The shops operate under the tenet of trust.

=== Religion ===
==== Sakhua ====
Sakhua (lit. 'deity divine force'), also known as Mizo religion, or Khua worship, is a traditional polytheistic ethnic faith practiced by the Mizo people prior to the widespread adoption of Christianity during the British annexation of Mizoram.

==== Christianity ====
Mizo people were influenced by British missionaries in the 19th century, as the British Raj subjugated the chieftainship under its dominance, which they later abolished by Assam-Lushai District (Acquisition of Chief's Rights) Act, 1954. Christianity is the predominant faith in Mizoram. According to the 2001 census, 86.9% of the population identified as Christian.

==== Bnei Menashe ====
In the 19th century, European Christian missionary activity in the region led to conversion of some Chin, Kuki, and Mizo peoples. In the mid-to-late 20th century, a rather small number of Mizo and related ethnic peoples in Assam and Mizoram began practicing Judaism, after a community leader had a dream in 1951 that they were descendants of the biblical figure Manasseh, a lost tribe of Israel. The Bnei Menashe were hesitant for DNA tests but agreed in 2004. The mtDNA and Y Chromosome DNA of tribal communities in Mizoram showed the absence of haplogroups associated with Jewish populations. However, some mtDNA results indicate traces of relations between tribes claiming Jewish descent and Near Eastern groups. Seven thousand Bnei Menashe have converted to Orthodox Judaism and immigrated to Israel by 2024. The Bnei Menashe were recognised as a "lost tribe" in 2005. Several hundred emigrated to Israel, where they have been settled in the Israeli city of Sderot.

==== Other Religions ====
Other small religious groups also exist, including those that follow Hinduism, Islam, and Buddhism, listed in order of adherent size.

=== Calendar ===
The Mizo have their own calendars which is a lunar calendar. They have 12 months in a year. They are:Pawlkut Thla, Ramtuk Thla, Vau Thla, Ṭomir Thla, Nikir Thla, Vawkhniahzawn Thla, Thiṭin Thla/Thlazing/Thlado, Mimkut Thla, Khuangchawi Thla, Sahmulphah Thla and Pawltlak Thla.

== Socio-political developments ==
=== Inner Line ===
The Inner Line is a former British colonial policy instituted in 1873 and applied to the territory of Mizoram in 1904. Historically the system was to demarcate political participation and governance systems of excluded territories and partially excluded territories. In the post-colonial era the Inner Line remained but transitioned into a boundary which restricts free entry into the state. It further prevents non-Mizos from acquiring any land, property or business in the state to avoid displacement of the local people. The policy is supported due to the fear of chim ral (lit. 'submerged into extinction') and tribal populations becoming a minority, such as the case in Tripura.

=== Present demand for inclusion in the Eighth Schedule ===
With 91.58% literacy, the second highest of the Indian states, Mizoram is a leader in the national emphasis on education. That has made people demand for Mizo to be recognised as an official language in the Eighth Schedule to the Constitution.

== See also ==
- Mizo diaspora
- Mizo people in Myanmar
- Chhînlung
- Mizo name

== Sources ==
- Alexander, Colin R (August 2019). Administering Colonialism and War: The Political Life of Sir Andrew Clow of the Indian Civil Service. New Delhi: Oxford University Press. p. 158. doi:10.1093/oso/9780199493739.001.0001. ISBN 978-0-19-909695-4.
- Bapui, Vanlal Tluonga (30 November 2018). "Hmar Language and Identity". In Kumar, Rajesh; Prakash, Om (eds.). Language, Identity and Contemporary Society. Newcastle Upon Tyne: Cambridge Scholars Publishing. ISBN 978-1-5275-2033-2.
- Chhakchhuak, Rema (2019). Mingo Phurrit: Zofate Ṭobul Chhuina leh thusep dangte [White Man's Burden: Zo Genealogy and other stories] (in Mizo). Mizoram: Our Hope Imprints. ISBN 978-93-5382-098-5.
- Chhangte, Lalnunthangi (1986). A preliminary grammar of the Mizo language (PDF). University of Texas (Masters of Arts in Linguistics thesis). Arlington: Universal Microfilms International.
- Feldman, Rachel Z. (2024). Messianic Zionism in the Digital Age: Jews, Noahids, and the Third Temple Imaginary. United States: Rutgers University Press. ISBN 978-1-9788-2819-3.
- Gogoi, Parismita; Kalita, Sishir; Lalhminglui, Wendy; Sarmah, Priyankoo; Prasanna, S.R.M. (22 September 2021). "Learning Mizo Tones from F0 Contours using 1D-CNN". In Karpov, Alexey; Potapova, Rodmonga (eds.). Speech and Computer:23 International Conference. Switzerland: Springer. ISBN 978-3-030-87802-3. ISSN 0302-9743.
- Goswami, B.B (1979). The Mizo Unrest: A Study of Politicisation of Culture (PDF). Jaipur: Aalekh Publishers.
- Haokip, D.L. (2014). "The Tales Telling the Location of Sinlung-Khul:Origin of the Chin-Kuki-Mizo Zoumi". In Sudhir, H. (ed.). Tribal History of North-East India: Essay in Honour of Professor Lal Dena. New Delhi: Concept Publishing Company. ISBN 978-93-5125-099-9.
- Hluna, John Vanlal (1992). Education and Missionaries in Mizoram. Delhi: Spectrum Publications.
- Hrangchhuana, H.B. (1987). Hmar Chanchin [Hmar History] (in Mizo). Aizawl: Hmar Student's Association.
- Kabra, K.C (2008). Economic Growth of Mizoram:Role of Business and Industry. New Delhi: Concept Publishing Company. p. 21. ISBN 978-81-8069-518-6.
- Kamkhenthang, H. (1988). The Paite, a Transborder Tribe of India and Burma. Dehli: Mittal Publications. ISBN 978-81-7099-070-3.
- Khiangte, Laltluanga, ed. (2017). Writings in Mizo Manuscripts (PDF). Aizawl: National Mission for Manuscripts. ISBN 978-93-80829-77-7.
- Khiangte, Laltluanga (2016). "Oral Traditions in the Community of the Mizos". In Khiangte, Zothanchhingi (ed.). Orality: the Quest for Meanings. India: Partridge Publishing India. ISBN 978-1-4828-8671-9.
- Lalhmingthangi, Thelma; Singh, Konthoujam Gyanendra (2022). "A Historical Analysis of the Nexus between Migration and Diffusion of the Tribal Mizos". In Singh, Manju; Tandon, Nupur; Potdar, Vidy; Bhatt, Preeti (eds.). Resilience and Transformation for Global Restructuring. UK: Ethics International Press. ISBN 978-1-871891-60-7.
- Lalrimawia (1995). Mizoram: History and Cultural Identity, 1890-1947. Delhi: Spectrum Publishers. ISBN 9788185319575.
- Lalthangliana, B. (2006). Culture and Folklore of Mizoram. Aizawl: Publications Division Ministry of Information and Broadcasting. ISBN 978-81-230-2658-9.
- Lalthangliana, B. (1989). Mizo Lal Ropuite [The Great Mizo Kings] (in Mizo). Aizawl: R.T.M Press.
- Lianhmingthanga (1998). Material Culture of the Mizo. Mizoram: Tribal Research Institute.
- Liangkhaia, Reverend (1938). Mizo Chanchin [Mizo History] (in Mizo). Aizawl: L.T.L Publications.
- Lloyd, J. Meirion (1991). History of the Church in Mizoram: Harvest in the Hills. Synod Publication Board. pp. 17–23.
- Lorrain, James Herbert; Savidge, Frederick William (1898). A Grammar and Dictionary of the Lushai Language (Dulien Dialect). Shillong: Assam Secretariat Printing Department.
- Low, Charles Rathbone (1883). Major-General Sir Frederick S. Roberts, Bart., V. C., G. C. B., C. I. E., R. A., a Memoir. London: W. H. Allen and co. p. 110.
- Mann, Rann Singh (1993). Culture and Integration of Indian Tribes. New Delhi: M.D. Publications. ISBN 9788185880037.
- McCall, Anthony Gilchrist (1949). Lushai Chrysalis. London: Luzac.
- Murthy, B. Lalitha; Subbarao, K.V. (2 August 2011). "Lexical anaphors and pronouns in Mizo". In Lust, Barbara C.; Wali, Kashi; Gair, James W.; Subbarao, K.V.; de Gruyter, Walter (eds.). Lexical Anaphors and Pronouns in Selected South Asian Languages: A Principled Typology. Berlin: Walter de Grurter GmbH & Co. KG. ISBN 978-3-11-081888-8.
- Nag, Sajal (2008). Pied Pipers in North-East India: Bamboo-flowers, Rat-famine and the Politics of Philanthropy. (1881-2007)=New Delhi. Manohar Publishers & Distributors. ISBN 978-81-7304-311-6.
- Nag, Sajal (April 2016). The Uprising: Colonial State, Christian Missionaries and Anti-Slavery Movement in North-East India (1908–1954). New Delhi: Oxford University Press. ISBN 978-0-19-946089-2.
- Nag, Chitta Ranjan (1998). Mizo Polity and Political Modernisation. New Delhi: Vikas Publishing House.
- Nunthara, C (1996). Mizoram: Society and Polity. New Delhi: Indus Publishing Company. ISBN 81-7387-059-4.
- Pachuau, Joy (29 November 2014). Being Mizo: Identity and Belonging in Northeast India. New Delhi: Oxford University Press. doi:10.1093/acprof:oso/9780199451159.001.0001. ISBN 978-0-19-908458-6.
- Parfitt, Tudor; Egorova, Yulia (2006). Genetics, Mass Media and Identity: A case Study of the Genetic Research on the Lemba. New York: Routledge. ISBN 0-415-37474-X.
- Parry, N.E; Hutton, J.E (1932). The Lakhers. London: Macmillan & Co, Limited. p. 1.
- Pau, Pum Khan (2020). Indo-Burma Frontier and the Making of the Chin Hills: Empire and Resistance. Taylor & Francis. ISBN 978-1-000-50745-4.
- Prakash, Ved (2008). Terrorism in india's Northeast: A Gathering Storm. India: Gyan Books. ISBN 978-81-7835-662-4.
- Prasad, R N; Chakraborty, P; Sailo, Michael Lalrinsanga (2006). Administration of Justice in Mizoram. New Delhi: Mittal Publications. ISBN 81-8324-059-3.
- Reid, Robert (1942). The Lushai Hills: culled from History of the frontier areas bordering on Assam from 1883-1941. Calcutta: Firma KLM.
- Reid, A.S. (1893). Chin-Lushai Land: Including a description of the various expeditions into the Chin-Lushai Hills and the final annexation of the country. Calcutta: Thacker, Spink and Co.
- Samuelson, Ramchuani Sena (1985). Love Mizoram. Imphal: First Impression.
- Sangkima (2004). Essays on the History of the Mizos. Guwahati: Spectrum Publications. ISBN 81-87502-77-0.
- Shakespear, John (1912). The Lushei Kuki Clans. London: Macmillan and Co. LCCN 14000139. OCLC 574955962. OL 6563643M.
- Shakespear, L.W (1929). History of the Assam Rifles. London: Macmillan and Co, Limited.
- Thanmawia, R.L. (1998). Mizo Poetry. Aizawl: Din Din Heaven.
- VanBik, Kenneth (2009). Proto-Kuki-Chin: A Reconstructed Ancestor of the Kuki-Chin Languages (PDF). California: University of California. p. 1. ISBN 978-0-944613-47-4.
- Vanlalchhuanawma (2007). Christianity and Subaltern Cuture: Revival Movement as a Cultural Response to Westernisation in Mizoram. Delhi: Indian Society for Promoting Christian Knowledge. ISBN 978-81-7214-901-7.
- Vanlaldika, Andrew H. (2014). Social Stratification in Mizo Society. New Delhi: Mittal Publications. ISBN 978-81-8324-475-6. LCCN 2014360094. OCLC 893890029. OL 31127060M.
- Verghese, C.G.; Thanzawna, R.L. (1997). A History of the Mizos. New Delhi: Vikas Publishing House.
- Lalrinfeli (1 July 2014). "Export Potential of Agricultural, Handloom and Handicrafts Products in Mizoram". In Verma, S.B. (ed.). Agricultural Marketing. New Delhi: Scientific Publishers. ISBN 978-93-86102-95-9.
- Vumson (1987). Zo History: With an introduction to Zo culture, economy, religion and their status as an ethnic minority in India, Burma and Bangladesh (PDF). Aizawl, Mizoram: Vumson.
- Zorema, J. (2007). Indirect Rule in Mizoram: 1890-1954. New Delhi: Mittal Publications. ISBN 978-81-8324-229-5. OCLC 271837683. OL 48056042M.

=== Journals ===
- Bawitlung, Vanlalringa (2011). "Hausata - Founder of Chinzah Chietainship in the Lai Autonomous District Council, Mizoram". Historical Journal of Mizoram. XII (1).
- Malsawmdawngliana (2018). "Exploring the new world: The first world war experience". Historical Journal Mizoram. XIX (1): 179–188.
- Sen, Anandaroop (2022). "Insurgent Law: Bengal Regulation III and the Chin-Lushai Expeditions (1872–1898)" (PDF). Modern Asian Studies. 56 (1): 1515–1555. doi:10.1017/S0026749X21000366.
- Zarzoa, Lal (2014). "Traditional Religion of the Lusei (Mizo) Tribe in the Premodern Age". The International Journal of Religion and Spirituality in Society. 4 (1). Granada: Common Ground Research Networks: 1–10. doi:10.18848/2154-8633/CGP/v04i01/51079.

=== Reports ===
- Borah, Ashim (2017). Ethnographic Report on the Hmars of Assam. Assam Institute of Research for Tribals and Scheduled Castes (Report). Assam: Ministry of Tribal Affairs.
