= List of Mizo clans =

Mizo clans refers to the clans and subclans of the Mizo people. The term "Mizo" is a collective name for the people inhabiting the State of Mizoram in India who have close affinity in dialect, origins and customs. The word "Mizo" liberally refers to the hill people living in Mizoram, but certain groups, such as Chakmas, Reangs, and Nepalis are not considered Mizo due to their lack of affinity.

== Mizo clans ==
Mizo Clans
Name	Sub-Clans	Notes
Hmar	Lawitlung, Zote, Ngurte, Khawbung, Biate, Ṭhiek, Pautu, Punte, Darngawn, Lungṭau, Leiri, Benzang, Pakhuang, Hrangkhawl, Hmar-lusei	
Lusei	Pachuau, Chuaunga, Chuauhang, Chhangte, Chawngte, Hauhnar, Hrahsel, Tochhawng, Vanchhawng, Chhakchhuak. Zahmuaka dynasties: Zadeng, Thangluaha, Palian, Rivung, Sailo, Rokhum	
Ralte	Khelte, Siakeng, Lalhchhun, Kawlni	
Fanai	Thaai, Pakhup, Hniarthul, Hniarcheng, Torel, Zarep, Hrangtling, Suakling, Zakham, Chhunchhir, Khintin, Nihliap, Airawm, Ruahngai	The Fanai chiefs trace their origins to Fanai who lived among the Zahau tribes east of the Tyao River. Fanai had a great grandson Rorehlova who was adopted by Rohnaa and raised alongside Lallula.
Lai	Zahau, Hauhih, Hauchhum, Chhunthang, Thanhrang, Khalthang, Bawithang, Bawitlung, Khuangli, Sunthla, Thlantlang, Sailung, Chinzah, Zathang, Panchun, Khninboh, Aineh	
Paite	Thado, Sukte, Thaute, Thiazang, Loasau, Phaileng, Darbung, Dim, Dimlo, Vangteh, Zung, Phunnawm, Hangzo	
Awzia (Minor clans)
Chawngthu	Khuntil, Khunsut, Khunthlang, Haukawi, Vanchiau, Maluang, Chingruam, Thangchhung, Saithleng	Under King Lersia, the Chawngthu are named for celebrating the Chawng. Chawngthu's were typically appointed as upas.
Khawlring	Midang, Leidir, Pialtel, Lungen, Thlaute, Milai, Parte, Rawlchhim, Chhunthang	The Khawlhring held a big village on Hringfa before being invaded by the Haka in the Haka-Lusei war. The Khawlhrings migrated into the Lushai Hills and the last Khawlhring chief was Lalmichhinga before settling in Lunglei.
Vangchhe (Vangchhia)	Theiduh, Zapte, Dochhil	The members of the Vangchhia clan were historically considered wealthy and prudent. Parents strived to associate their children under the tutelage of Vangchhia clan members.
Chawhte	Lianhna, Chhuanhawih, Hawnzawng, Chamte, Halte, Thaumau, Tamva, Chawngdang, Chawngfiang, Chawnghawih	
Ngente	Kawngte, Zuahtite, Duahthlang, Duahchhak, Lailo, Chawnghawih	The Ngente lived in Chong Honi. In 1780 two chief brothers Lalmanga and Ngaia quarreled leading to Ngaia forming a new village. Ngaia was killed by Lalmanaga and the Ngente were attacked by the Lushei and broken up. They migrated to the Lunglei afterwards.
Rawite	Zahte, Pialtu, Aite, Buite, Hmungte, Chhawrte, Chhehduah	
Khiangte	Kumchhung, Khupchhung, Khupthlang, Mualvum, Khello, Chawngte	The Khiangtes were driven out of the Chin Hills to the east of the Manipur river. The clan is now significantly smaller and found in northern Mizoram. Lt John Shakespear states this caln was divided into seven families without branches.
Paihte	Dapzar, Rangte, Vaiphei, Khupchawng, Hangzi, Tawnsing, Langel, Tungte, Tangpua, Dosel, Naulak, Tawmding, Sote, Tunglut, Tungdim, Mangsum, Lamzang	
Renthlei	Lianhlun, Zachhing, Thangthawl, Tinkulh, Chhingthlang, Sawhnel, Thundurh, Chhonghek	This clan lived in a big village known as Minpui, southwest of Selesih. The Renthleis showed contempt for the Lusei tribe by throwing stones at the pig skulls on posts outside the house. The Luseis posted the skulls indoors while the Renthleis maintained them outdoors.
Tlau	Buallchhuak, Vantawl, Bawlchhim, Thlengngam	
Falam Pawi	Hlawnmual, Lalvawng, Chhawnchhek, Hlawncheu, Khawruna, Tlaichhun, Huha	

== Lusei subclans ==
Lusei subclans
Name	Sub-Clans	Notes
Pachuau	Lianthung; Chhawnthliak; Liannghawr; Chuaulak; Lalbawma (thlah); Darche; Cher lal; Varchuau	
Chhangte	Darchhun; Nghakchi; Pamtê; Lungtê; Vawnkghak; Chawnglûn; Kawl chi; Tumpha	
Chawngte	Tuichhung; Pamtê; Lungtê; Muchhip chhuak	
Chuaungo	Vanpuia; Hmunpel; Chumthlûk; Thlehnghel; Darkim; Laller; Zawngpâm; Auhmun	
Chuauhang	Lathang; Chungpui; Chawn Chirh; Khuanglawi; Chawn Chhawn; Vai chuau	
Chhakchhuak	Hualngo; Hualhang; Lumkhua	
Hauhnar	Hauthul; Haubul; Tuithang; Sênlai	
Hrahsel	Selpui; Sumkhum; Sawntlung; Saza	
Tochhawng	Topui; Tobul; Chhakawm; Chemhler; Muchhipchhuak	
Vanchhawng	Vanlung; Chemhler; Sumkhum; Chengrel; Kaithum	
Zahmuaka dynasties	Sailo; Rivung; Palian; Zadeng; Rokhum; Thangluah; Chenkual; Chawnglul	

== Ralte subclans ==
Ralte subclans
Name	Sub-Clans	Notes
Khelte	Lutmang; Zaucha; Chhinghlu; Vohlu; Hmaimawk; Thatchhing; Vangkeu; Chhiarchuang; Vohang; Zahlei	
Siakeng	Engkai; Chawngtual; Haizang; Chhakawm; Hilu; Hilthang; Thangbur; Lehvung; Khumchiang; Hnawlsut	
Lelchhun	Chhunthang; Tunglei; Chhiarkim; Leihang; Vawngsual; Chuanglawk; Thangbung	
Kawlni	Rêngsi; Kâwlvawm; Rêngngo; Thangchhuan; Rênghâng; Arte; Chalchung; Lawisût; Bungsût; Helhlah; Chalbâwk; Thasûm; Kawltung; Saphaw; Uikhawl; Khawngharw; Bhal eng	

== Hmar subclans ==
Hmar subclans
Name	Sub-Clans	Notes
Lawitlang-Hrangchal	Siala Chhung; Dara Chhung; Laia Chhung; Varte; Tlawmte; Parte; Chhungte; Tungte; Suamte; Tlangte; Chawnchhim; Sialhnam	
Zote	Chawngvawrtu; Chhuankhuptu; Chawngtualatu; Hrangzote; Pusiate; Saiate; Parate; hlihlera; Darkhawlaia; Buansuang	
Khawbung	Riangsete; Fente; Pangamte; Pazamte	
Ngurte	Pachhinga (thlah); Siadanga (thlah)	
Ṭhiek	Khawzawl; Tuahlawr; Buhril; Selate; Thluchung; Kangbur; Tamte; Amo; Hekte; Laldau; Hrangte; Kungate; Vankal	
Lungṭau	Sawngate; Infimate; Nungate; Thlawngate; Mihriamate; Intovate; Keivawm; Lunchuang	
Leiri	Pulamte; Puralte; Pudaite; Neihngaite; Lamvaiphei	
Banzang	Sinate; Sanate; Famhawite; Chawnghmunte; Lamchangte	
Pakhuang	BUangpui; Hrangulte; Khuangpui	
Darngawn	Rualngul; Faiheng	
Biate	Ngamlei; Nampui; Chungngawl; Zate; Tamte; Thlihran; Dameih Thianglai; Hmunhring; Khurbi; Puilo; Faihriam	
Hrangkhawl	Chawrai; Sakechep	
Hmar-Lusei		
Thahdo	Khuangsai (Milui); Singsuan; Lianthang; Haukip; Kipzen; Changchhan; Tongpam; Dongel (Chawngthu)	

== Sources ==
- Nag, Chitta Ranjan (1998). Mizo Polity and Political Modernisation. New Delhi: Vikas Publishing House.
- Nag, Chitta Ranjan (1999). Post-Colonial Mizo Politics (1947-1998). New Delhi: Vikas Publishing House.
- Liangkhaia, Reverend (1938). Mizo Chanchin (Mizo History) (in Mizo). Aizawl: L.T.L Publications.
- Verghese, C.G.; Thanzawna, R.L. (1997). A History of the Mizos. New Delhi: Vikas Publishing House.
- Lalbiakthanga (1978). The Mizos: A Study in Racial Personality. Guahati: United Publishers.
