= Chhepchher =

Musical instrument

Chhepchher is a musical instrument of Mizoram, northeastern India. It is a six-stringed guitar which became popular with the Mizo people during World War II and is taught to girls and boys from a young age.
