= Pachhunga Hmar =

Indian businessman and politician (died 1962)

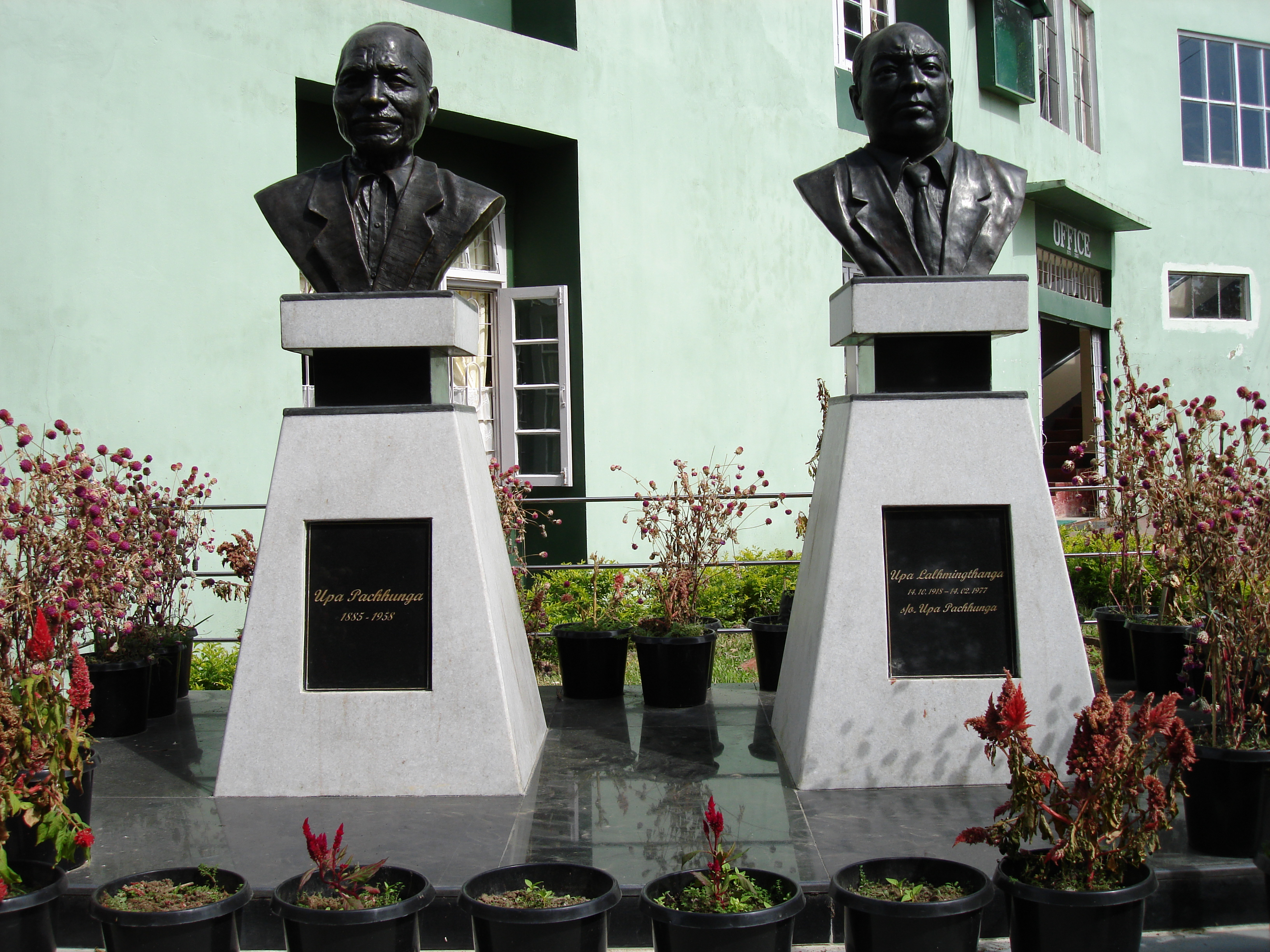
- Busts of Pachhunga and his son Lalhmingthanga near the entrance of PUC.
- Born: Unknown
- Died: 1962; Lushai Hills, Assam, India
- Other name: Mizo Hausapa
- Occupations: Businessman, politician, philanthropist
- Known for: First President of Mizo Union; namesake of Pachhunga University College
- Children: Lalhmingthanga

Pachhunga Hmar (died 1962), commonly referred to as Pachhunga, was an Indian businessman, politician, and philanthropist from the Lushai Hills (present-day Mizoram). Known as "Mizo Hausapa" (Mizo for "The Rich Mizo Man"), he was regarded as the 'wealthiest person' in Mizoram during his era. He served as the first President of the Mizo Union, the first political party of the Mizo people. He was instrumental in the founding of Aijal College, later renamed Pachhunga University College in his honour now the oldest and largest institution of higher education in Mizoram.

== Early life and business ==
Pachhunga belonged to the Hmar tribe, one of the major ethnic groups within the broader Mizo community. By the mid-1940s, he became prominent entrepreneur in Aizawl, then the administrative centre of the Lushai Hills district of Assam. He was described as "the most prosperous Mizo businessman" and "the wealthiest man in Mizoram during his era." His residence in the Dawrpui locality of Aizawl served as a gathering place for political and civic activities during the formative years of Mizo political consciousness.

== Political career ==
=== Mizo Union presidency (1946) ===
As British rule in India approached its end, Mizo leaders established the Mizo Union as the region's first political party. The party was formally constituted on 6 April 1946, with a constitution drafted by R. Vanlawma and P.S. Dahrawka. On 25 May 1946, the first party elections were held, and Pachhunga — described as "the premier businessman" — was elected as first President of the Mizo Union, with R. Vanlawma as General Secretary. The party quickly gained widespread popular support, particularly among commoners who opposed the traditional system of tribal chieftainship and the levies imposed by chiefs.

Internal tensions soon emerged. Younger, formally educated party members challenged the founding leadership, who lacked formal higher education. At the party's first general meeting on 24–26 September 1946, this faction mounted what historian C. Nunthara has described as a "coup," leading to Pachhunga's resignation and the removal of other founding leaders.

=== Mizo Union Council and defection to UMFO ===
Following his ouster, Pachhunga and his supporters formed an offshoot party — the Mizo Union Council — which operated from his Dawrpui residence. This effectively divided Aizawl: the original Mizo Union held sway in the south, while the Council controlled the north, backed by Pachhunga's influence and supported by wealthy entrepreneurs and tribal chiefs.

When the United Mizo Freedom Organisation (UMFO) was formed on 5 July 1947 by dissidents who advocated for the accession of the Lushai Hills to Burma, Pachhunga defected to this party. His reputation as the region's wealthiest businessman lent prestige to the new party.

=== Electoral contests ===
In the Mizo District Council election of 4 January 1952, Pachhunga contested the Aizawl-Lunglei constituency as a UMFO candidate against Ch. Chhunga of the Mizo Union. Pachhunga defeated Chhunga, securing 860 votes to Chhunga's 787. Despite this individual victory, the Mizo Union won 17 of 18 constituencies overall. Pachhunga and Chhunga faced each other again in the 1957 Mizo District Council election.

=== Hydari Conference (1947) ===
In November 1947, Pachhunga was one of four UMFO delegates to the Hydari Conference, convened by Muhammad Saleh Akbar Hydari, Governor of Assam, to determine the political future of the Lushai Hills following India's independence. The UMFO delegates — Lalmawia, Pachhunga, Hmingliana, and R. Zuala — represented the pro-Burma accession stance, while the Mizo Union delegation argued for integration with India. The conference and its delegations are documented in S.K. Chaube's Hill Politics in North-east India.

== Philanthropy and educational legacy ==
In 1957, with many Mizo youths completing secondary education but having no college opportunities in the region, J. Malsawma and H.K. Bawichhuaka established an "Organising Board" to pursue the creation of a college. The board's first meeting was held at Pachhunga's house in Dawrpui. Pachhunga, by then widely recognised as a philanthropic entrepreneur, was appointed chairman of the Organising Board.

The college, named Aijal College, was inaugurated on 15 August 1958 — Indian Independence Day. Following Pachhunga's death in 1962, his son Lalhmingthanga, who had served as Treasurer of the Organising Board, donated ₹10,000 to the college in his father's memory. In recognition, the institution was renamed Pachhunga Memorial College (PMC).

The college later underwent several name changes — to Pachhunga Memorial Government College (PMGC) in 1965, Pachhunga Government College in 1977, and finally to Pachhunga University College (PUC) in 1979 when it became a constituent college of North Eastern Hill University. It is now a constituent college of Mizoram University, a central university, and is consistently ranked among the top 100 colleges in India by the National Institutional Ranking Framework (NIRF).

== Personal life ==
Pachhunga belonged to the Hmar tribe and had a son, Lalhmingthanga, who served as Treasurer of the Aijal College Organising Board and made the memorial donation that led to the college being named after his father. He was known by the honorific title "Pu" and the nickname "Mizo Hausapa" (The Rich Mizo Man), reflecting his standing as the wealthiest Mizo of his era.

== See also ==
- Pachhunga University College
- Hmar people
- Mizo people
- Mizo Union
