= Selesih =

Former settlement of the Mizo tribes

- Former village
- Location within Mizoram
- Coordinates: 23.1570221°N 93.2099831°E
- Country: India
- State: Mizoram
- District: Champhai
- Block: Khawbung
- Established: c. 1740
- Founder: Chungnunga; Lianlula

Selesih (also known as Seleishih) was a village founded around c. 1740 by two brothers, Chief Chungnunga and Chief Lianlula. It eventually dispersed and consolidated Sailo rule in precolonial Mizoram. In modern day, Mizoram, the site was established between Khawbung and Zawlsei (Champhai district), which is now under a football field.

== Etymology ==
Selesih refers to "Sele" (wild mithun) and "Sih" (natural water spot).

== History ==
Chungnunga and Lianlula were the two sons of Chief Sailova who crossed the Tiau river in the early 18th century after his death. Under the village of Lianlula's son, Pu Kawla, the two chiefs established a joint settlement. Selesih was the largest Mizo settlement of the time in 1740 and functioned as a confederation of chiefs and tribes. This includes the five major tribes and the 12 minor tribes.{{}} The sons of Chungnunga (Lalhluma, Rohnaa and Lalchera) cooperated with Lianlula's sons (Pu Kawla, Darliankuala and Darpuiliana) to rule the settlement. Chungnunga and Lianlula would die in Selesih. It is believed that Selesih is the second village of the same name after the Haka-Lusei War destroyed the first Selesih east of the Tiau river.

Selesih consisted of 20 zawlbuks and seven villages under the joint chiefs. Mizo heroes such as Lianchia, Aihniara, Buizova Chula and Saichawmkhupa also resided in Selesih. It is estimated that Selesih boasted up to 7000 houses.

=== Decline ===
It's been speculated that the scarcity of water and firewood led to the seven villages dispersing, thus dissolving Selesih in favour of a western migration. The Mizos who remained in the region were subject to taxation and tribute to the Pawi tribes, which was ended with the Thlanrawn Rawt under Chief Lallula. The nature of jhumming also required regular migration to feed the population.

The Thlanrawn massacre by Chief Lallula was estimated to have occurred c. 1753-1754. Fearing reprisal of the Pawi, Lallula and his followers left Selesih to establish his chiefdom of Zopui.

== Legacy ==
The influence of Selesih saw the standardisation of the Duhlian dialect becoming a dominant language within the settlement. After Selesih, Lallula and other chiefs would expand across in Mizoram and establish the Lusei dialect as the lingua franca of the Lushai Hills.

== Chiefs ==
Early Lushai Chiefs Family Tree

Zahmuaka
Zadeng	Rivunga	Ṭhangura	Paliana	Rokhuma	Thangluaha
Thangmanga	Chawnglula
Chênkuala	Sailova
Chungnunga	Lianlula
Lalhlûma	Rohnâa	Lalchêra	Pu Kawlha	Dârliankuala	Dârpuiliana
Laltuaka	Lallula	Rolûra	Savunga
Lalpuiliana	Lallianvunga	Mângpawrha	Vûta	Lalngûra	Lalzika	Lalbuta
Lalsavunga	Ngûra	Suakpuilala
Vanhnuailiana	Vanpuilala

== Sources ==
- Chatterjee, N. (1979). Monoliths and Landmarks of Mizoram. Aizawl: Tribal Research Institute.
- Changte, Lalnunthangi (1986). A preliminary Grammar of the Mizo Language (PDF). University of Texas (Master of Arts in Linguistics thesis). Texas.
- Lalbiakthanga (1978). The Mizos: A Study in Racial Personality. Guahati: United Publishers.
- Laldinpuii, Audrey; Laithangpuii (2013). "Mizoram's Rice Economy and Gender Relations". In Krishna, Sumi (ed.). Agriculture and a Changing Environment in Northeastern India (PDF). London: Routeledge India. p. 218. doi:10.4324/9781315667034. ISBN 9780367818388.
- Lalthangliana, B (2005). Culture and folklore of Mizoram. Publications Division Ministry of Information & Broadcasting. ISBN 978-81-230-2658-9.
- Lalthangliana, B. (1975). History of Mizo In Burma. Mandalay: Arts and Science University Mandalay.
- Liangkhaia (1938). Mizo Chanchin (Mizo History) (in Mizo). Aizawl. p. 56.
- Verghese, C.G.; Thanzawna, R.L. (1997). A History of the Mizos. New Delhi: Vikas Publishing House.
