= Khual Lam =

Mizo traditional dance performed for guests

- Etymology: "Dance of the guests"
- Genre: Folk dance

Khual Lam is a Mizo traditional dance from the Indian state of Mizoram that is performed for guests. Nowadays, it is performed in every major Mizo cultural festival but still maintains the tradition of performing for guests such as the state Chief Minister, or government officials.

== Performance ==
=== Costume ===
Female dancers wear Puandum, which is a handwoven big black shawl striped in red, yellow, and green. The Puandum is draped over the shoulders of the females. The size of the stripes may vary.

Male dancers wear Ngotekherh, a traditional big white shawl with black patterns with and black and white stripes. The black patterns may vary from square patterns to stripes. It is also draped over the shoulders of the males.

=== Choreography ===
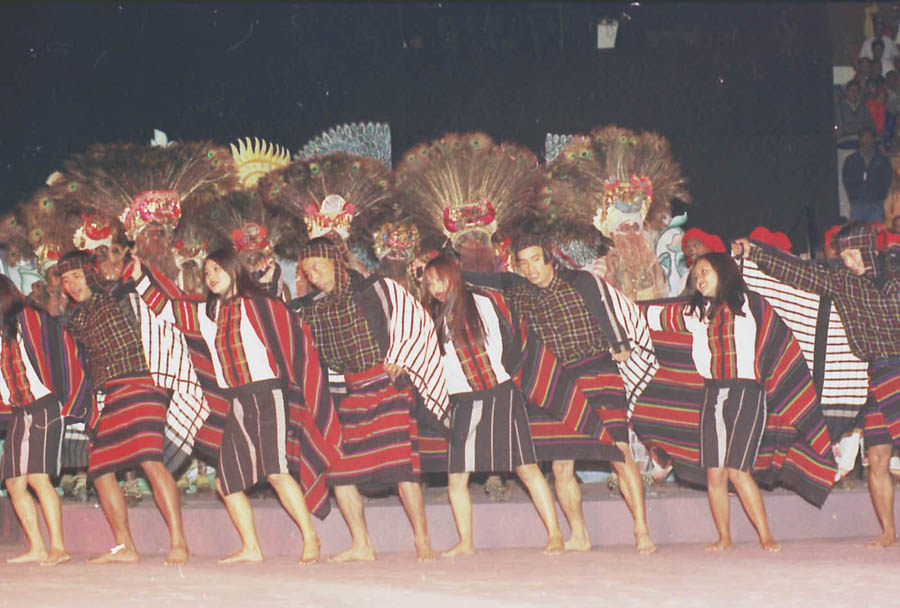

For the first part of a typical Khual Lam dance, dancers extend an arm while taking a step forward and retract the arm back to sway their shawls and do the same for the other arm and leg. The second part of the dance is where a male and female face each other; they first sway side to side, then bend, and push their elbow/arm backward for the shawl/cloth to move.

On rare occasions such as cultural festivals, extra steps are included that are more traditional, such as lifting the cloth high then squatting down while retracting your arm, and repeating the step. It would look appealing when viewed from above as the former Mizo chiefs would view from a mountain.

=== Accompaniment ===
No songs are sung during the dance, rather, it is accompanied by traditional instruments mainly the dar (gong) and khuang (drum) with usually a 7/8 beat.

== Etymology ==
Khual Lam means the dance of the guests, deriving from the Mizo words khual (meaning "guest") and lam (meaning "dance").

== Mythological origin ==
Tlatea of Pangrawn's third son was named Kalkawilama, who lived in Kawilam. One day, Kawilam town was celebrated with Chapchar Kut. Tlatea's friends returned from drinking alcohol, they wrapped their zu bel (wine pots) in a huge cloth and brought it into Kawilam. Native Kawilam people saw them and exclaimed:

"Oh look! Guests (can also be translated as strangers) are dancing toward us!"

which bore the name Khual Lam.

== Historical occasions ==
The Mizo people before the British colonization believed the soul either went to Pialral, which is heaven, or Mitthi Khua which is hell. The Sakhua states that one may only enter pialral by obtaining the title of Thangchhuah, where either dance or hunting must be mastered to obtain this title.

The Khuangchawi ceremony is where the Thangchhuah title is given, and it was necessary to invite people from the nearby villages on this occasion. On their way to the ceremony, Khual Lam was performed for the honored invitees.
