= Mizo people in Tripura =

People of Mizo descent in Tripura, India

Tripura a awm Mizote
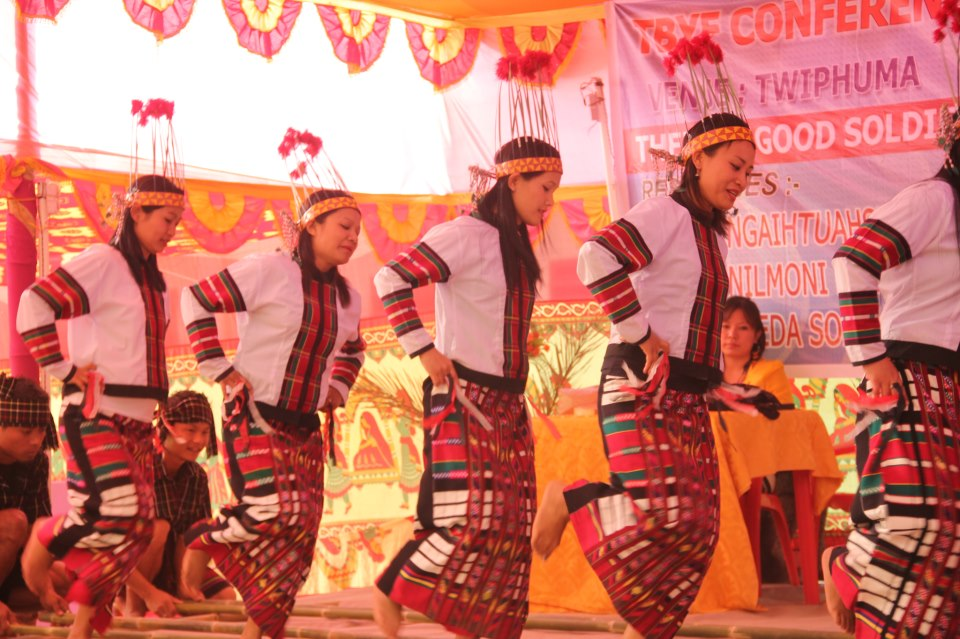
- Traditional cheraw dance performed in the Jampui Hills

Total population
- 14,850 (2024)

Regions with significant populations
- Agartala; Jampui Hills; Khumulwng

Languages
- Mizo; Kokborok, Bengali

Religion
- Christianity; Hinduism

Related ethnic groups
- Halam people; Mizo diaspora

The Mizo people in Tripura are an ethnic minority in the northeast Indian state. They have established settlements in areas like the Jampui Hills and integrated into Tripura's socio-cultural landscape.

== History ==
The Mizo population in the Jampui Hills grew steadily until the mid-19th century when the monkeypox disease caused widespread fatalities, forcing many to vacate the area. The last major wave of Mizo migration to the Jampui Hills occurred in the early 20th century under the leadership of Chief Dokhuma Sailo in 1910 and Chief Hrangvunga Sailo in 1912.

In 1930, Dokhuma Sailo and Hrangvunga Sailo were honored by the Maharaja of Tippera with the titles Raja Bahadur and Raja, respectively. Vungsakeia, a close associate of Dokhuma Sailo, was also conferred the title of Montri for his wisdom and bravery. Since the early 20th century, the Mizo people have continued to inhabit the Jampui Hills peacefully.

=== Vanghmun ===
One of the most significant Mizo settlements in Tripura is Vanghmun, established on February 5, 1919, by Raja Bahadur Dokhuma Sailo. The village started with 20 houses and has grown into a community that preserves Mizo culture and history. It is notable for being the cleanest village in Tripura. It is also known for contributions to local agriculture and its involvement in significant historical events, such as:

- 1944: The rescue of an American fighter plane crew that crash-landed near the village.
- 1967: During the Mizo unrest, the village became a transit point for the Mizo National Front.

== Culture and economy ==
The Mizo people of Tripura retain their traditional culture while integrating with the region's broader society. Agriculture remains a primary occupation, with pineapple and citrus fruit cultivation being significant contributors to their economy. The Jampui Hills, known for their scenic beauty, is a hub for orange cultivation, often referred to as the "Orange Bowl of Tripura," and introduced Tripura the Orange Festival.

Christianity is the predominant religion among the Mizo, introduced through missionary activities. However, some Mizo people, particularly the early settlers, adopted Hinduism and worshipped deities such as Kali.

== Notable Tripuri Mizos ==
The Mizos of Tripura have made significant contributions to contemporary culture, particularly in music and politics. Prominent figures include:

- Borkung Hrangkhawl (B.K.): A rapper, singer, and songwriter. Born on October 7, 1987, he has won the VIMA Asia Award and is widely recognized across Northeast India. He is the son of Bijoy Kumar Hrangkhawl.
- Bijoy Kumar Hrangkhawl: Born on January 25, 1946, he is a prominent political leader and the current president of The Indigenous Progressive Regional Alliance (TIPRA). A former leader of the Indigenous Nationalist Party of Twipra, his work has been instrumental in advocating for the rights of indigenous communities in Tripura.
