= Zawlsei =

- village
- Location in Mizoram, India Zawlsei (India)
- Coordinates: 23.1570221°N 93.2099831°E
- Country: India
- State: Mizoram
- District: Champhai
- Block: Khawbung
- Elevation: 1,249 m (4,098 ft)

Population (2011)
  - Total: 492
- Time zone: UTC+5:30 (IST)
- 2011 census code: 271369

Zawlsei is a village in the Champhai district of Mizoram, India. It is located in the Khawbung R.D. Block.

== Demographics ==
According to the 2011 census of India, Zawlsei has 96 households. The effective literacy rate (i.e. the literacy rate of population excluding children aged 6 and below) is 97.46%.

Demographics (2011 Census)
	Total	Male	Female
Population	492	230	262
Children aged below 6 years	59	32	27
Scheduled caste	0	0	0
Scheduled tribe	487	227	260
Literates	422	191	231
Workers (all)	290	138	152
Main workers (total)	195	104	91
Main workers: Cultivators	165	85	80
Main workers: Agricultural labourers	0	0	0
Main workers: Household industry workers	1	1	0
Main workers: Other	29	18	11
Marginal workers (total)	95	34	61
Marginal workers: Cultivators	77	28	49
Marginal workers: Agricultural labourers	4	1	3
Marginal workers: Household industry workers	2	1	1
Marginal workers: Others	12	4	8
Non-workers	202	92	110
