= Zahmuaka =

First Lusei chief

- Chief of Khawrua and Tlang; Khawrua leh Tlang Lal
- Predecessor: Chhanpiala
- Successing Dynasty: Thangur
- Issue: Zadenga; Palliana; Thangluaha; Thangura; Rivunga; Rokhuma
- House: Paihtê/Lusei
- Father: Chhuahlawma
- Religion: Sakhua

Zahmuaka (lit. 'To meet a hundred people') was the first Lusei chief in the 16th century. He would establish chieftainship among the Mizos and their descendants. He is also the forefather of most chiefs in the Lushai Hills, India. His sons would establish Lusei dynasties of chiefs and migrate into the Lushai Hills (now Mizoram) over time. Zahmuaka himself, however, lived and died in modern-day Myanmar. His descendants would migrate to Mizoram under Lallula.

== Early life ==
Zahmuaka was born to Chhuahlawma in the Chin Hills of Myanmar. Chhuahlawma was a Paite warrior captured by the Lusei and Chhakchhuak, while the Mizos in Seipui fought wars with the Tedim east of the Manipur River. Chhuahlawma was adopted by the Chhakchhuak and given a wife. Despite Zahmuaka's lineage and ancestry being Paite, researchers term the ancestors between Zahmuaka and his forefather, Nova, to be referred as Duhlian. Zahmuaka and his parents grew up on Lentlang. Zahmuaka's name was chosen by his mother because his father Chhuahlawma was captured with one hundred men alongside him during a raid.

As he grew up among the Lusei, Zahmuaka was married to Lawileri. Lawileri was from Lawitlang. However she was known for having loose character. The village youth would throw stones on Zahmuaka's door to check if Lawileri was home. Zahmuaka and his wife were very poor and had built their house below the main path of the village. The other villagers would disrespect Zahmuaka by throwing stones at his house. They had seven sons. The youngest son died in infancy. Zahmuaka worked as the gatekeeper of the village fort. The first son was Zadenga. He was named Zadenga which meant Za (hundred) and Denga (throw or pelt) in reference to the humiliation Zahmuaka faced. The second son was Paliana. Pa (man) and lian (big) refers to a strong healthy child he presented himself as. The third son was Thangluaha which means one who surpasses or one who is famous. Zahmuaka wasn't rich at this point but he had surpassed poverty and other villagers in wealth. The fourth son was Thangur, which meant good and above the ordinary. This name was chosen for his handsome features. The fifth son was Rivunga. Ri (sound) and vunga (many) refers to the noisy house of having many children. The sixth son was Rokhuma. Ro (property) and khum (to exceed) signified that Zahmuaka was now prosperous with many sons working under him.

== Chieftainship ==
After the death of Chhanpiala at Khawrua and Tlang villages, the Seipui villagers suggested Zahmuaka to become their chief. According to Mizo legend, shortly before Chhanpiala's death, Zahmuaka had dreamt that a stream of water from his genitals fell as a fountain sprays over the hills. He initially thought of it as a bad omen. The dream made Zahmuaka hesitant to become chief before Lawileri convinced him. Both Khawrua and Tlangkhua numbered at a population of 2000 at the time. Due to Thangur's military prowess on the battlefield, Zahmuaka was given confidence by the villagers. His sons were placed on night patrol and night watch. This was due to the threat of Pawi or Sukte raids. The threat was egregious because the Pawis and Suktes had access to firearms where as the Lusei did not at this point. Soon after becoming chief, Zahmuaka gave up his role and returned to Seipui. To retain Zahmuaka as their chief, the villagers offered fathang, or a paddy tribute to the chief. This began the custom of taxation in chieftainship. As a result, Zahmuaka continued to rule.

Since Zahmuaka's sons were warriors and commanded the zawlbuks, more taxes were introduced such as sachhiah and buhchhun. This was to accommodate Zahmuaka, as his sons were defending the village over jhumming.

== Death ==
After Zahmuaka's death in the first quarter of the 17th century, Zadeng would assume chieftainship of Tlangkhua while the other sons would have their own villages.

== Genealogy ==
Zahmuaka Family tree (Duhlian descendents)

Nova
Dongula
Niguitea
Ngekenguka	Lakiri
Bawklua
Sihsinga
Ralnaa
Chhuahlawma
Zahmuaka

== See also ==
- Mizo Chieftainship
- Lallula

== Sources ==
- Government of Mizoram (1994). Mizoram Today. Aizawl: Directorate of Information.
- Bandyopadhyay, Pradip Kumar (2004). The Mizo leadership. India: B.R. Publishing Company. ISBN 978-81-7646-441-3.
- Liangkhaia, Reverend (1938). Mizo Chanchin (Mizo History) (in Mizo). Aizawl: L.T.L Publications.
- Zawla, K. (1964). Mizo Pi Pute leh an thlahte Chanchin. Aizawl: Gosen Press.
- Verghese, C.G.; Thanzawna, R.L. (1997). A History of the Mizos. New Delhi: Vikas Publishing House.
- Lalbiakthanga (1978). The Mizos: A Study in Racial Personality. Guahati: United Publishers.
- Ralte, Lalhmingliani (2008). "Zahmuaka". Historical Journal of Mizoram. 9 (1).
- Lalthangliana, B. (2005). Culture and Folklore of Mizoram. ISBN 9788123013091.
