= Political parties in Mizoram =

== Major national parties ==
- Indian National Congress (INC)
- Bharatiya Janata Party (BJP)

== Major Regional Parties ==
- Mizo National Front (MNF)
- Zoram People's Movement (ZPM)
- People's Conference Party (PCP)
- Zoram Nationalist Party (ZNP)

Note:

1. Zoram People's Movement (ZPM) is a merged entity of a faction of Zoram Nationalist Party, Zoram Decentralisation Front, Zoram Reformation Front, Zoram Exodus Movement, and Mizoram People's Party.
2. People's Conference Party (PCP) is a merged entity of Mizoram People's Conference (MPC), and People's Representation for Identity and Status of Mizoram (PRISM).

== Minor Regional Parties ==
- Mizoram Fourth Front
  - Zoram Thar (New Mizoram)
  - Mizoram Chhantu Pawl (MCP) or Save Mizoram Front
  - Operation Mizoram (OPM)
- Ephraim Union (EU)
- Hmar People's Convention (HPC)
- Hmar People's Convention (Democracy) (HPC-D)
- Hmar People's Convention (Reformation) (HPC-R)
- Lai People's Party (LPP)
- Paite Tribes Council (PTC)

== Mizoram Secular Alliance (Fourth Front) Parties ==
- Indian National Congress (INC)
- People's Conference Party (PCP)
- Zoram Nationalist Party (ZNP)
- Zoram Thar (New Mizoram)
- Mizoram Chhantu Pawl (MCP) or Save Mizoram Front
- Operation Mizoram (OPM)

== Defunct parties ==
- Mizo Union - merged with Indian National Congress
- United Mizo Freedom Organisation (UMFO) - merged with Eastern Indian Tribal Union (EITU)
- Eastern Indian Tribal Union (EITU)
- Mizo National Union (MNU) - merged with Mizo People's Conference
- Mizo National Front (Democratic) (MNF(D))- merged with Indian National Congress
- Mizo National Front (Nationalist) (MNF(N))- renamed as Zoram Nationalist Party
- Citizens Common Front (CCF) - merged with Zoram Nationalist Party
- Mizo Janata Dal (MJD) - renamed as Mizo People's Conference
- Mizo People's Conference (Progressive) (MPC(P)) - merged with Mizo National Front
- Maraland Democratic Front (MDF) - merged with Bharatiya Janata Party
- Reang Democratic Party (RDP) merged with Bharatiya Janata Party
- Zoram Nationalist Party (ZNP) - merged into Zoram People's Movement (ZPM)
- Zoram Decentralisation Front (ZDF) - merged into Zoram People's Movement (ZPM)
- Zoram Reformation Front (ZRF) - merged into Zoram People's Movement (ZPM)
- Zoram Exodus Movement (ZEM) - merged into Zoram People's Movement (ZPM)
- Mizoram People's Party (MPP) - merged into Zoram People's Movement (ZPM)
- Mizoram People's Conference (MPC) - merged into People's Conference Party
- People's Representation for Identity and Status of Mizoram (PRISM) - merged into People's Conference Party

== See also ==
- Political parties in Tripura
