= Mizo District =

Former district of Assam (1947–1972)

Lushai Hills (1947–1954) Mizo District (1954–1972) Mizoram
- Former autonomous district of Assam
- 1947– 1972
- Map of Autonomous Hill Districts of Assam demanded by the All Party Hill Leaders Conference for a separate Hill State.
- Capital: Aizawl
- Population
  - 1951: 196,202
  - 1961: 261,014
  - 1971: 332,339
- Government
- Deputy Commissioner
  - 1949-1954 (first): S.N. Barkataki
  - 1972 (last): G.C. Srivastava
- Historical era: Cold War
  - District established: 15 August 1947
  - Abolished chieftainship (Lushai Hills Reorganisation of Chiefs’ Rights Act, 1954): 1954
  - Renamed as Mizo District (The Lushai Hills District (Change of Name) Act, 1954): 1954
  - Mautam famine: 1959
  - Mizo National Front uprising: 28 February 1966
  - Ascension to Union Territory of Mizoram: 21 January 1972
Preceded by	Succeeded by
British Lushai Hills	Union Territory of Mizoram
- Today part of: Mizoram

The Mizo District, formerly called Lushai Hills District, was an autonomous district of the Indian state of Assam from 1947 till 1972 until it was granted the status of a Union Territory. This region was a significant part of Mizo history as it formally abolished the Mizo chieftainship system in 1954. It also encountered the 1959 Mautam famine, which led to the Mizo National Front uprising and the subsequent 20-year insurgency.

== Etymology ==
The original name of the district, Lushai Hills district, descends from a colonial misnomer. The British, upon encountering the Lusei tribes, applied the name to the Mizo people living in the region. Early administrators assumed Lushai to mean head for Lu and cut from sha or shat referring to the clan name to mean decapitation in reference to the headhunting practices of the traditional Mizo society.

The Lushai Hills District (Change of Name) Act, 1954 changed the name to Mizo district. Mizo connotes highlander. Mi refers to a person while zo refers to hills.

== Background ==
A Lushai Hills district was formed in 1898 under British India, merging the former North Lushai Hills and South Lushai Hills regions into a single district of the Assam province. It was regarded as an Excluded Area, beyond the Inner Line, which meant that the laws and regulations of the province did not apply, and the people from the plains could not access it without a permit.

== History ==
=== Independence ===
Upon achieving independence the Zo community had been split into three countries. While the Chins and Lushai were split in 1937 with the creation of the Colony of Burma, the creation of Pakistan with the jurisdiction of Chittagong Hill Tracts divided the Mizos once more. Mizos in Tripura were also temporarily divided as Tripura retained its sovereignty until ascending to India in 1949.

The Independence of India saw two Mizo political parties, namely the Mizo Union and the United Mizo Freedom Organisation, continue to the new Dominion of India. While the UMFO had lost its support with the Lushai Hills joining India, the Mizo Union continued to work on a premise of opposing the continuation of the institution of Chieftainship. The chiefs opposed this policy and did not wish to give up their rights which had been enshrined for the British as a policy of indirect rule. The newly independent India could not take up this issue so early on which led to the superintendent L.L Peters to continue as superintendent of the Lushai Hills. Peters issued a circular to the chiefs that any subject who misbehaved with them would be reported to him so that they are punished. The order became perceived as an instrument of oppression as chiefs who opposed to Mizo Union would report cases of misbehaviour against supporters and members to arrest them.

On the independence day of India, no Indian flags were hoisted as rival factions of the Mizo Union opposed recognition of ascension to the Indian Union. The procession for the Indian Independence celebration was forcefully stopped after Khawtinkhuma threatened the party to resign after threats of violence had been issued.

=== L.L. Peters ===
On 26 September 1947, Superintendent L.L Peters called a meeting for the Mizo Union general assembly. Both the left and right wing of the Mizo Union attended. The meeting was called on request of the Governor of Assam to tell them it was preferable to be a part of India than Burma or Pakistan. Peters also informed the group of future developments, such as the district council of Mizoram. Peters also made the village representatives of the Mizo Union party to cast a vote for one leader to be responsible for the Mizo Union as opposed to two leaders of two factions. As a result, Khawtinkhuma was elected president of the Mizo Union party. From this point onwards, the two factions of the Mizo Union became less distinct. On 15 April 1948, Peters convened an Advisory Council of twenty Mizos already active in Mizo politics to be formed. In this vote, Lalmawia, the president of the United Mizo Freedom Organization, gained more votes than Khawtinkhuma and became the chairman of the advisory council. To Vanlawma this was a sign that Mizo people were interested in independence and that they did not vote for Khawtinkhuma who held a pro-Indian policy. Peters also dissolved the Village Advisory Committees at the meeting by citing that their purpose had not been fulfilled and the policy needed to be rescinded.

=== Hydari Conference ===
Muhammad Saleh Akbar Hydari, who was the governor of Assam, held a meeting of the Lushai Hills delegates. The Mizo Union delegates were R. Thanhlira, H.K. Bawichhuaka, R. Dengthuama, Ch. Saprawnga and Vanchuanga. The UMFO sent Lalmawia, Pachhunga, Hmingliana and R. Zuala. Superintendent Peters took three chiefs, Lalsailova, Ngura and Awksarala, to the meeting. The meeting was held on 10 November. The meeting passed a resolution to establish a 37-member Advisory Council for the Lushai Hills. It was designed as an interim arrangement before the finalisation of the Bordoloi sub-committee. As an advisory body, it could not initiate legislation, but Bordoloi assured certain provisions for local self-governance under the body.

Elections for the advisory council were held on 23 March for the chiefs and 15 April for the commoners.

Advisory Council Election Results
Member	Party
Lalsailova	Chief of Kelsih
Khawkunga	Chief of Bukpui
Ngura	Chief of durtlang
Lalbuanga	Chief of Tukkalh
Taikhuma	Chief of Pukpui
Lalthawvenga	Chief of Sailam
Awksarala	Chief of Phullen
Lalbuana	Chief of Thingsai
Chhunmunga	CHief of Serkawr
Lianmana	Chief of Mamte
H. Vanthuama	Mizo Union
Tuikhurliana	Mizo Union
Lalchungnunga	Mizo Union
R. Thanhlira	Mizo Union
Vanlalbuka	Pawi-Lakher Region
Zadailova	Mizo Union
Khelhnuna	Mizo Union
Vaitlaia	Mizo Union
H. Khuma	Mizo Union
Pastor Pasena	Mizo Union
Chaltuahkhuma	Mizo Union
Pastor Saitawna	Mizo Union
Hrangaia	Mizo Union
R.B. Chawnga	Mizo Union
Chawnghnuaia	Mizo Union
Chhunbura	Mizo Union
Lalbuaia	Mizo Union
K.T. Khuma	Mizo Union
Ch. Saprawnga	Mizo Union
R. Dengthuama	Mizo Union
Pastor Khuanga	Mizo Union
Hengmanga	United Mizo Freedom Organisation
Vakova	United Mizo Freedom Organisation
Lalsangpuii	Women Aizawl
Remthangi	Women Aizawl

=== Advisory Council ===
Mizo District Advisory Council Members (c. 31.8.1948) N. K. Rustomji (ICS) and L. L. Peters (ACS) [two sitting in middle] with other members

The first meeting of the Advisory council led to an argument as to who should chair the meeting. The Assam Government intervened as placed the superintendent as the chair of the advisory council meetings. After this, more argument occurred concerning voting rights. The controversies escalated when Peters forwarded a draft regulation for the future constitution of the Lushai Hills district. The Mizo Union members opposed this and demanded sufficient time to discuss the provisions of the draft. However Peters did not cooperate and wishes to push the act through. The draft was translated into Mizo and distributed to the council members. A committee on the draft was formed consisting of Sparwanga, Vanthuama, Lalbuaia, Thanhlira, Lalchungnunga, Dengthuama with chiefs Ngura and Taikhuma. Peters who was supported by the chiefs continued to push the draft at a second meeting on 23 August. The matter led to the Governor of Assam to handle the matter after the council was prorogued by Peters.

Nari Rustomji, advisor to the government of Assam for tribal affairs, was despatched to Aizawl. Rustomji held numerous meetings with the leaders from 30 August to 2 September. The draft regulation was accepted by the Mizo Union but it did not change the distrust of the Mizo Union against the superintendent and the chiefs. Peters as superintendent became empowered to run some departments in the Lushai Hills. Peters supported the chiefs and did not wish to abolish the ramhual and zalen institutions of chieftainship. He limited by order for the appointment of such individuals to ten houses per one hundred families. However this was not satisfactory for the Mizo Union who wished to abolish chieftainship completely. Peters began to weaken the Mizo Union by removing their leaders. He offered Khawtinkhuma a government job which successfully removed him from the party. This was attempted once moreon R. Thanhlira but failed. Thanhlira was sworn in as President of the Mizo Union on 28 November.

=== Civil disobedience movement ===
Peters had openly supported the UMFO over the Mizo Union and worked with chiefs. The Mizo Union demanded to have Peters removed as superintendent and began a civil disobedience movement of non-cooperation in 1948. On 1 December, a publicdeclaratyion was made of lengthy accounts of grievances. The speech blamed the chiefs for unjust and influence to lower the power of the party. Peters was declared the root cause of the issue due to his support of chieftainship. The speech was printed in the Mizo Union newspaper Thupuan. The Mizo Union threatened to resort to non-violent non-cooperation with the administration if Peters was not removed by 27 December 1948 as the deadline. A memorandum on the issues of Peters office was also submitted to the Assam government on 24 November 1948. Peters retaliated by invoking the Assam Maintenance of Public Order Act to arrest the leaders of the Mizo Union. The Union General secretary M. Vanthuama and treasurer Lalbuaia were arrested along with R. Thanlirah while he returned to Aizawl from Shillong. The Mizo Union's newspaper Thupuan was also closed. On 28 December 1948, the commoners proceeded with the civil disobedience movement. The orders of Peters and his officials were not followed. The commoners refused to pay the customary taxes of fathang, sachhiah and buhcchun to their chiefs or build the houses of the chief. Coolie quotas were also halted. In some cases attacks on chiefs or their properties occurred which saw their gardens destroyed. Furthermore, a strike of a few hundred people was organized in the streets, where the strikers shouted, "Peters go home!". Peters was stuck in his office as the protests continued. He was rescued with the Assam rifle platoons from Agartala. Detention facilities were built along with outposts for the Assam rifles. Instances of violence broke out and thus the government was incentivised to use law and order in the interests of the chiefs.Despite the UMFO opposing the Mizo Union and supporting chieftainship, the government did not look favourably due to their pro-independence stance.

A mass crackdown and arrest were issued, and fines were imposed on the participants. Among the arrested were Vanthuama, Lalbuaia, Rosiama, Chawnghnuaia, Kawnga, Vanchuanga, Lalsawia, Chhunga, Sangkunga, Liankunga and H. Khuma who had been returning from Shillong. The leaders were kept in prisons in Gauhati, Tezpur and Silchar. Peters furthermore formed two columns to visit unruly villages and restore order. Peters's disposition was more in line with his predecessors in terms of repressing the Mizo sentiment for progress. Peters refused all offers of mediation between the government and the Mizo Union. His wife by comparison was compassionate and popular among the Mizos. The Assam government once again sent Rustomji to mediate. Rustomji in Enchanted Frontiers describes the tense situation at the moment. Rustomji met with Lalsailova who was chief of Kelsih and president of the Lushai Chief's Council. The chief's council preferred harsh measures and punishment for the Mizo Union's grievances against them despite most being imprisoned. The chiefs argued that the Mizo Union was misleading the public. Violence was occurring as stones were thrown at the chief's houses and threats of murder made. Rustomji soon met with the Mizo Union leader's who were not imprisoned. The meeting was chaotic according to his accounts as the party threatened further devastation unless the demands were met. Rustomji identified Vanthuama and Thanhlira as being the most conspicuous among the leaders. Rustomji met with parties of political prisoners handcuffed while travelling across the district. Among them was Dengthuama. The next morning, meetings were held with villagers and explained that the government was taking all measures to stop exploitation by chiefs. An emphasis was made on cooperation and peace over violence. Rustomji returned to Aizawl where Peters, whom he referred to as a "fire eating superintendent", had finally agreed to release the Mizo Union leaders. A joint farewell from both parties was held for Rustomji as he departed the district in acknowledgement of his intervention.

Rustomji had successfully negotiated with both sides and released the arrested Mizo Union leaders. The agreement had been reached between Dengthuama and Peters on 27 January 1949. Rustomji himself had gone against the advice of the Assam Government and the Hill tribe who were surprised at the peaceful outcome. Since the Mizo Union cooperated with the Indian National Congress in Assam, Peters was eventually recalled to Shillong and replaced with Barkataki on 1 March 1949.

=== S.N. Barkataki ===
Satyendra Nath Barkataki was the first Indian superintendent of the Lushai Hills. Barkataki was considered an able and competent superintendent who cooperated with the Mizos liberally. Barkataki contributed to the motor roads in the Lushai Hills on arrival. In order to please the Mizos he requested Reverend Mendes (Pu Mena) to start the first ceremonial shovelful of dirt. He used Mizo villagers to volunteer to dig the road and managed to establish a road between Aizawl and Lungleh. Barkataki was considered apolitical as he maintained good relations with the leaders held influence over the Mizo people.

The civil disobedience movement reignited over the issue of the chieftainship institutions of nominating upas, ramhuals and zalens along with the paddy and meat tax. Barkati referred the matterto Lalkailuia Sailo who was assistant superintendent. Sailo argued that changes could only be made if the chiefs were to cooperate on the matter. A joint meeting of chiefs and the Mizo Union were held on 14 June. The resolution of the meeting saw the superintendent issue an order that if a villager were to move to another village he could offer his house to the chief. If the chief did not wish to purchase it it can be sold to another villager without the chief's ability to seize it.

Barkataki had previously been acquainted with Mizo students as a university student. He was also cooperative with the Mizo leaders who knew him personally. Barkataki's chief contribution was the initiation of electrification of the Lushai Hills. Under the British, the production of electricity for the Mizos were never a priority. With Barkati's influence, a program began in 1954 with the Assam government's aid. However, the production was considered low and unimpactiful due to its ability to power a portion of Aizawl. Barkataki was also known for convincing the Assam government to divert more funds to the Lushai Hills for the purposes of economic development. He was popular for his willingness to meet with the poorer individuals and alleviating their burdens.

=== Chieftainship question ===
On 14 October 1949, the Lushai chiefs' council held a meeting to safeguard their rights and privileges under customary Lushai law. The resolution was submitted to the Advisory Committee stating the demands:

1. Reservation of one seat in the district council for upas of the chief.
2. Reservation of six seats in the district council for chiefs.
3. Exemption of all the sons and brothers of the chief from coolie labour.
4. Reservation of a seat for khawchhiar (village writer) in the village councils.

The upas who enjoyed many privileges under the institutions of chieftainship also began to policially mobilize against the Mizo Union. The upas formed that Chief's Elders Association in October 1949. A memorandum of their support of the chiefs council's demands along with a reserved seat for them on village councils were given to Barkataki. Similarly the Pawi-Lakher Tribal Union was founded by Hengmanga of Sangau village to support the interests of the southern Lushais who had political and cultural differences to the Mizos. The creation of the Pawi-Lakher Tribal Union was supported by the Lakher Pioneer Mission. Its objectives were:

- To cut off all connections with the Lushais and to have a separate administration of their own.
- To demand the employment of more educated youths of the Pawis and Lakhers in the district administration.
- To press the government to construct better roads in the region and to establish a high school and more dispensaries.

=== Formation of District Council ===
On 11 February 1950, Barkataki summoned the Advisory Council to discuss the formation of the district council. The meeting formed the core legislation and constitution of the district council. It would consist of 24 members of which 20 would be elected via adult franchise. Two seats were reserved for women and two seats for Chakamas. A president would be elected among the members of the district council. The president will be able to nominate two-three ministers. A chairman and deputy chairman will be elected by the district council members. The president may be impeached on a two thirds majority vote if violates the constitution. The terms of the ministers are under discretion of the president. The term of the council would last five years. Any dispute of controversy within the council is not liable to be appealed by courts. Two thirds of the members would form quorom. Any literate permanent resident of the Lushai Hills is eligible to be on the district council. The minimum age to be on the council is 21.

The Lushai Hills district became autonomous after Assam passed the Assam Autonomous District Council Act 1951. The advisory council of the Lushai Hills were dissolved on 12 November 1951. The government fixed 4 April 1952 as the election dates of the district council.

=== Sixth schedule ===
In 1952 the Indian Constitution was written. In article 342 of the constitution, the Mizos fall into the category of scheduled tribes. This meant that the Mizos are considered tribal but designated so temporarily as at some point in the future the term will no longer be applied. The sixth schedule provided a district council that would participate in elections. Elections were also held for Indian members of parliament, Assam members of the legislative assembly and district council members. For the member of parliament position, an Indian representative of congress party from Silchar was elected for both Mizoram and Silchar. For the Assam member of the legislatie assembly, Mizoram was divided into Aizawl West, Aizawl East and Lungleh.

=== 1952 Assam general election ===
Before the Assam General election of 1952 Saprawnga was elected unopposed to the Rajya Sabha by the Assam Pradesh Congress Committee. The Lushai Hills participated in the 1952 general election on 4–5 January. The seats concerning the Lushai Hills consisted of Aizawl East, Aizawl West and Lungleh. The Mizo Union won all three seats. R. Thanhlira, Denghtuama and Saprawnga joined the Assam legislative Assembly. Saprawnga became the first Chief Executive Member in the Lushai Hills District Council. However, Saprawnga would be appointed parliamentary secretary, in which Lalsawia would take his place on 16 April 1952. The elections in the Lushai Hills district council were subsequently held on the same date. There were a total of 18 elected constituencies. The Mizo Union managed to win 15, the United Mizo Freedom Association won one and the Tribal Union of Pawi Lakher won two seats. The Lushai Hills district council was formally inaugurated by Bishnuram Medhi on 25 April 1952. Lalsawia nominated Hrangaia and Sangkunga as Executive Members.

District Council Members 1952-55
Member	Party
Ch. Saprawnga	Mizo Union
Lalsawia	Mizo Union
F. Sangkunga	Mizo Union
Lalbuia	Mizo Union
Hrangaia	Mizo Union
Tuikhurliana	Mizo Union
Pachhunga	United Mizo Freedom Organization
H. Khuma	Mizo Union
Chaluahkhuma	Mizo Union
Vanlalbuka	Mizo Union
Rotluanga	Mizo Union
P. Saitawna	Mizo Union
R. Thanhlira	Mizo Union
Papuia	Mizo Union
Khuaimawnga	Pawi-Lakher Region
Pathala	Mizo Union
R.B. Chawnga/A. Thanglura	Mizo Union
Vakova (died June 1955)/Hunawnga	Mizo Union
Unelected Nominated Seats
Sainghinga	
Dr Rosiama	
Medhi Chakma	
Chief Taikhuma / Lalziki	Taikhuma refused his nomination.
Chief Lalthawvenga / Lalchungnunga	Lalthawvenga refused his nomination.

=== Early legislations on chieftainship ===
The district council was empowered without the previous powers of superintendent and the diminished power of a deputy commissioner. The Mizo Union worked to abolish chieftainship in the Lushai Hills. The first bill in the first session on 23 June to 10 July 1952 was the Lushai Hils (Chiefship Abolishment) Act, 1952. it provided for the withdrawal of all powers and rights of chiefs on 1 January 1953. The chiefs were permitted to stay in office until the village councils would be established. The Lushai Chiefs Council opposed this. A meeting was held on 24–25 November to press the government to preserve their rights. The district council passed another act abolishing Sachhiah, Fathang,Thirdengsa,Khuaichhiah and Chikurchhiah effective on 1 June 1953. The coolies system was also abolished with effect on 1 January 1953. The Lushai Hills District Act No.3 of 1953 reduced the chief's fixed fathang of six tins to three tins.

The chiefs filed a petition in the Assam High Court. The accusation was the act was ultra vires of the constitution, and the district council did not have the power to pass the act. They appealed to the governor of Assam as well. Negotiations were held with the council to make exemptions on land revenue tax to the chiefs in return for the bills passing but were not heeded.

=== Developments in Assam ===
Gopinath Bordoloi was known to be sympathetic to the Hill tribes however, his successor Bishnuram Medhi carried a different policy. Satyen Barkataki the superintendent of the Lushai Hills district had closely worked with Bordoloi and supported the Mizos as an administrator, however he was dismissed by Medhi who began to experience serious differences between their roles. A circular was made to impose Assamese in the Lushai Hills. The Mizos had no historical relations with the Assamese nor spoke the language at the time. The UMFO used the opportunity to criticize the Mizo Union as political agents of Assamese chauvinism and colonization. As a result of the circular, Lalmawia resigned from the Council of Ministers in protest but failed to improve the image of the Mizo Union. As a result the UMFO convened a general conference on 1–3 October 1953 and demanded an autonomous hill state consisting of the hills areas of Assam, Manipur and Tripura. The chiefs of the Lushai Hills supported this despite the terms being ambiguous compared to the Naga National Council and their demands. The result of the circular saw Assamese taught in schools.

=== Administrative developments ===
After the independence of India, the district continued to exist in the same form, with the typology changed to Scheduled Area and Inner Line in place. In addition, the district was granted an autonomous district council to formulate its own laws and regulations under the Sixth Schedule to the Constitution of India. On 23 April 1953, the Pawi-Lakher Regional Council was established for Southern Mizoram. The council possessed similar functions to that of the Mizo District Council.

=== Chieftainship and village councils ===
Prior to independence, the people of the district rallied behind a "Mizo" identity and formed a political party called Mizo Union. In 1954, the Government of India accepted their demand and changed the district's name to Mizo District.

Under the efforts of the Mizo Union, the institution of chieftainship was abolished. The privileges of fathang (rice paddy tax) and the customary laws of the chiefs right were gradually suspended with the Lushai Hills Acquisition of Rights Act 1954. The chiefs were compensated for this in return of their rights gone. The first Mizo chief to give up his chiefdom and chieftainship was Khawvelthanga of Maubuang (1885–1971). The abolition of chieftainship saw 259 Lushai chiefs and 50 Poi chiefs lose their customary rights under the two acts which were rendered effective on 1 April 1956 and 15 April 1956. By 1953, the coolie system was also abolished in Mizoram. The Acquisition of Chiefs Rights Act 1954 was similarly followed with acts made by Manipur and Tripura which abolished chieftainship in 1955.

The arrival of village councils impacted the life of the Mizos. The commoners now could voice concerns on customary rights through the council president instead of through their chiefs. These rights and actions included: making of jhum paths, forest management, village officials appointments, regulation of jhumming practices and inheritance of property.

The governor of Assam passed the Administration of Justice Rule in 1953 under the sixth schedule of the Indian constitution. These rules made the complete framework of the political organisation of the Lushai Hills district autonomous. Two parallel offices were created, the district council and the office of the deputy commissioner. The deputy commissioner would be appointed by the Government of Assam.

The village councils of the Lushai Hills would have a number of councilmen elected based on population. These councilmen would be elected by a popular vote of the villagers who were above the age of 25. Every village council consisted of a president, vice president, and secretary. The main functions and authorities would be divide land among the villagers impartially, and look after the matters of the village. it also carried the power to exempt labour for individuals above 60 or below 15. A chief judicial office was created for a system of courts related to the new village councils. Village courts would be assigned to the village councils and deal with offences not liable to a fine of more than ₹50. Two subordinate courts would be established at Aizawl and Lungleh which would deal with parties involved from two different villages. The district council court is known as the Lushai Hills district court and the judicial officers and president are appointed by village council with approval of the Governor of Assam. The hierarchy of courts would see matters appealed in Assam High Courts or the Supreme Court in New Delhi.

Councilmen allocations per population
Population of village	Councilmen
61-100	6
101-140	7
141-180	8
181-220	9
221-260	10
260+	11

=== States Reorganization Commission ===
The States Reorganization Commission (SRC) arrived in Silchar near Mizoram in 1955. It consisted of Sardar K.M. Panikkar, H. Kunzru and Fazal Ali. The introduction of Assamese into schools had raised tensions among Bengalis and the hill tribes. The Mizo Union had been discredited for supporting the Congress party who imposed the policy. As a result, Thanhlira resigned from the Mizo Union and joined the UMFO. Furthermore, with the lack of representation in northeast India, political developments began to emerge for the formation of a state for the hill tribes. The demand was voiced initially in the Assam Hill Tribal Leaders Conference to the States Reorganization Commission, which was promptly rejected. The UMFO, headed by Lalmawia, met with the SRC at Silchar on 5 May 1955 and demanded a separate hill state for the Mizos. The negotiations lead to the Assam Government offering to reconsider their stance on imposing Assamese on the hill states, which lead to Lalmawia making a statement to withdraw the demand for a separate hill state. As a result of Medhi's policies and conduct, Nehru reassigned Medhi to Madras, where he served as governor of Tamil Nadu and Andra Pradesh and Madras. When Nehru visited the region on 28 August 1955, a delegation of hill leaders demanded a hill state as Assam had solely focussed on civil development of the plains region and let the hills become backwards. Complaints were also raised at the agitation of the imposition of Assamese in schools and other sectors.

In its report, the SRC rejected the demand for creating a separate hill state in Assam and expressed satisfaction with the measures adopted by the Assam Government. The SRC argued the district council of Mizoram was enshrined in the sixth schedule of the Indian constitution and was the best representation for the undeveloped hill tribes of Assam. The SRC recommended a special committee to study the working of the sixth schedule. The SRC's decision, however, was unpopular among the hill tribes. From 26–28 October 1955, the hill tribes held a conference in Aizawl where a decision was taken to merge the political parties into one which would be known as the East India Tribal Union (EITU). The UMFO became a constituent of the EITU. The Mizo Union preferred to maintain its separate identity. In Assam, the arrival of Bimala Prasad Chaliha as chief minister of Assam saw a policy change regarding the concerns of tribals. The Naga National Council threatened to balkanize the state of Assam. The demands of the Mizo Union also led to Chaliha disliking the Mizo Union. He went as far as to accuse the Mizo Union leaders of corruption. He assigned Williamson Sangma as Minister of Tribal Areas Development from the EITU. The EITU consisted of Mizo, Karbis, Kacharies, Garos and Khasis members. The Nagas were not in the EITU. The EITU was led by Reverend B.M. Bugh as president and Stanley Nichols Roy as secretary. The EITU was not a strong, cohesive or united party but formed in opposition to Assamese policies that alienated the hill tribes. In 1957, Nehru visited Shillong and met with Williamson Sangma and Lalmawia who the Assam Pradesh Congress Committee managed. Nehru assigned minister roles, Sangma became Minister of Tribal Areas Department while Lalmawia became parliamentary secretary. A. Thanglura became Chief Parliamentary Secretary. The EITU gained little traction in the Mizo Hills. This was due to the reality of a separate hill state having the potential for infighting with the Garos and Khasis.

=== 1957 Assam general election ===
The Mizo Union won 2 of the three seats in the legislative assembly. The district council won 16 seats and the UMFO captured 8 seats. Saprawnga was made chief executive of the district council, Vanlaltluanga was Council Chairman, Hrangaia was Deputy Chairman. Dr. Rosiama was appointed Finance minister as an executive member while Tuikhurliana was appointed forestry minister as the second executive member.

District Council 1957 results
Name	Party	Subdivision
Pachhunga	United Mizo Freedom Organization	Aizawl
Lalrinliana	United Mizo Freedom Organisation	Aizawl (Bial I)
Vanlalbuka	Mizo Union	Aizawl (Bial II)
C. Pahlira	Mizo Union	Aizawl (Bial III-A)
Kaibuaia	Mizo Union	Aizawl (Bial III-B)
Chawngbuaia	United Mizo Freedom Organisation	Aizawl (Bial IV-A)
Awka	United Mizo Freedom Organisation	Aizawl (IV-B)
K.C. Lalvunga	United Mizo Freedom Organisation	Aizawl (Bial V)
V. Rosiama	Mizo Union	Aizawl (Bial VI)
Chaltuahkhuma	Mizo Union	Aizawl (Bial VII)
C. Chhunbura	United Mizo Freedom Organisation	Aizawl (Bial VIII)
Hrangaia	Mizo Union	Aizawl (Bial X)
Lalthankima	United Mizo Freedom Organisation	Aizawl (Bial XI-A)
Lalmawia	United Mizo Freedom Organization	Aizawl (Bial XI-B)
Tuikhuirliana	Mizo Union	Lungleh (Bial XII)
C. Thansiama	Mizo Union	Lungleh (Bial XIII)
Chhingkawnga	Mizo Union	Lungleh (Bial XIV)
Ch. Saprawnga	Mizo Union	Lungleh (Bial XV)
Khuaimawnga	Mizo Union	Lungleh (Bial XVI)
Sangchema	Mizo Union	Lungleh (Bial XVII)
Medhi Chakma	Mizo Union	Lungleh (Bial XVIII)
Unelected Nominated Seats
Hmingliani		
Dr. Rosiama		

=== Mautam ===
As the district council of Mizoram lacked money and funds, they were completely dependent on the government of Assam. The anti-famine campaign organisation had been established in 1951 in anticipation of the cyclical oncoming of the mautam famine. Dr C. Rokhuma was the chairman and founder. The organisation was later reorganized with Lalmawia as chairman, H. Khuma as vice-chairman, Rokhuma as organising secretary, Pacchunga as treasurer, Lalbiaka as vice-secretary and Vanthuama as a member. The AFCO spread pamphlets and public awareness on the mautam famine and how to best combat it in terms of rat extermination. The AFCO was successful in attracting members from both the Mizo Union and UMFO as a non-partisan organisation.

In 1954, signs were shown that bamboo was beginning to flower. By 1957, the rat population began to increase, and signs of mautam were being observed. The situation was worsened by the fact that only 9 months of food were stored in people's houses over the last two harvests. The AFCO encouraged people to kill the rats and produced fruits like bananas. In 1954, the Supply Minister of Assam met with the AFCO, who tried to warn of the upcoming Mautam, which was dismissed as a tribal superstition. However, with the insistence of the AFCO, the minister assured aid if the situation did escalate to famine. The District Council of Mizoram also counter-intuitively banned pesticides before the AFCO pressured the policy to be reverted. On 29 October 1958, the council passed a unanimous resolution as a precautionary fund for rat population management and testing of relief measures. However, Chaliha ignored the demands of the Mizo Union and most Assamese officials who had little to no experience in Mizoram did not believe that the flowering of bamboos would lead to a famine. As a result, the government did not pay any attention or support precautionary measures.

The AFCO under C. Rokhuma continued to promote anti-famine measures. Rokhuma submitted fortnightly reports on the status of the bamboo and rat populations since 31 October 1957. Sundharam Pillai, a plant protection officer was sent to Mizoram to study bamboo flowering. Under Pillai and Rokhuma a plant protection office was established in Aizawl on 28 May 1958 with local officers appointed. The famine intensified and the Assam Government did not officially recognize it. When the Finance Commission visited the district the truth of the famine led to an initial aid program of 6 trucks and 150 jeeps to transport food. Food was airdropped as well. Chaliha, who was against the Mizo Union for supporting the APHLC and a separate hills state, had stopped cooperating with the district council. Chaliha instead preferred to use the Mizo National Famine Front which had formed from the Mizo Cultural Society under Vanlawma and now led by Laldenga. The MNFF gained credit for their famine relief operations while also spreading their nationalist messages such as the slogan "Mizoram for Mizos".

Violence also occurred during mautam. In 1960 while Indian soldiers were stationed in Mizoram to distribute rice. On 21 March, a Sikh military drive and some Mizo boys had a minor auto collision. Each party accused the other of being at fault until it escalated to court and one Indian soldier was beaten up as a result. At the hospital, the wounded Indian soldier was recovering and tensions were high as both Mizo and Indian youth met outside in big crowds but remained peaceful until dispersion. The following Sunday the Deputy Commissioner Jamthong called the leaders of Aizawl city to inform them to control the Mizo youth brawling with Indian soldiers. The military were deployed to distribute rice for the famine. An inquiry was made whether or not Indian soldiers should carry guns to protect themselves while distributing rice from brawlers. R. Vanlawma stood up in the meeting and stated "The Indian government regarded us as a part of themselves, calling us brothers. Now they try to put rice and bullets in our mouths at the same time as if we are rebellion to be suppressed. We don't want rice and bullets handed together: instead, let all the Indians go home and we will manage our own affairs.". No commentary were made by other leaders on Vanlawma's comments. Changes were made after the meeting and Mizo soldiers drove the trucks and distributed aid instead of the Sikhs. The Indian soldiers injured by brawlers were also sent home after their recoveries.

=== Development of the EITU and APHLC ===
The effects of the famine lead to a distrust of the Mizo people of the Assam Government. This also arguably contributed to a separatist sentiment in Mizoram. The EITU placed a resolution on the party for all members of the legislative assembly and ministers to resign in protest to the Assam Government. In 1960 the Tura conference was held with a resolution proposed to that effect. However the political attitudes of the Garo and Khasi leaders led to a split in the party. Lalmawia, who was the chief of the EITU in Mizoram, was Secretary while Williamson Sangma, a Garo leader, was minister of Tribal affairs and Reverend Pugh of the Khasi Hills was a minister. These three leaders refused to resign their political positions and acquired a lenient outlook on the Assamese Government. As a result the Mizoram branch of the EITU with the exception of Lalmawia split from the main EITU faction in the Khasi and Garo Hills resulting in the dissolution of the party. Williamson Sangma would go on to found the All Party Hill Leaders Conference in 1960. As the EITU had become indifferent to the issue of the mautam famine, the EITU collapsed and lost all its support in Mizoram. Some of the EITU leaders and the Mizo Union joined the APHLC. However, in the 1962 election, the EITU would win one seat on the district council. The Mizo Union, who had become aggravated by the Assam Language Crisis and the famine response, cooperated with the APHLC and actively participated. A. Thanglura, a Mizo Union leader, became the first chairman of the APHLC. However, Thanglura left the APHLC to form the Mizoram District Congress at Aizawl in 1961. The vice chairman of the APHLC was Professor C.G. Swell, with S.D.D. Nichols Roy as General Secretary.

=== Assamese language crisis ===
The Mizo Union grew tensions with the Assam Government over the handling of the famine and grew disillusioned with the Indian National Congress in Assam. Chaliha would then subsequently pass the Assam Official Language Bill on 21 and 22 June 1960 which would make Assamese the state language. In response, the Mizo Union passed a resolution withdrawing its support to the Congress on the grounds that Chaliha failed to effectively deal with the famine and that the state language of Assamese was an unfair policy to the hill tribes. The Eastern India Tribal Union (EITU) in Mizoram and the Mizo National Famine Front both opposed this policy while the Mizo Union voiced support for the creation of Greater Mizoram. As a result, V.L. Tluanga, C.Pahlira and C. Chhunga visited Manipur to mobilize support for the Mizo people living outside of Mizoram. In 1960 the United Mizo Freedom Organization was dissolved along with the Mizo Union right wing into the Eastern India Tribal Union to form the All party Hills Leader Conference (APHLC). The APHLC demanded for the creation of a hill state separated from Assam to accommodate the tribals. The creation of the APHLC led to the Mizo Union supporting statehood for Mizoram. This action alienated the Mizo Union from Chief Minister of Assam, Chaliha who began to distrust the party. The raising of tensions amongst other tribes and Bengali speakers led to violence as Assamese residents were assaulted. Around the same time, Thanglura, a member of the Mizo Union and Chief Parliamentary Secretary, formed the Mizo Congress. The Mizo Congress joined into Chaliha's ministry, where the Mizo Congress began to make traction. Initially the party would be mainly followed by the Hmar tribes until 1967 when Dengthuama became its president. The reason the Indian National Congress formed so late in Mizoram is argued that the Mizo Union was pro-Congress for a long time. A. Thanglura stated that Ch. Saprawnga, who was the most influential in the Mizo Union, "appeared to be ready to follow the Congress party" from the very beginning.

The APHLC held a conference on 6–7 July 1960 to discuss the issue of the Assamese language crisis. The resolution of the conference states that:

- "The position and the conditions of the Hills people in Assam are such that the acceptance of the Assamese language, now or at any time, which would place the Assamesein a more dominant position, will lead to the assimilation of all the Hills people into the Assamese Community, thereby gradually leading to the disintegration of their identity as distinct communities of India, which identity has been given recognition and protection under the Constitution. Such assimilation and disintegration are against the deepst sentiments of the Hills people and detrimental to the composite culture of India, which is born of unity in diversity."
- "The imposition of the Assamese language will overburden the Hills people with too many languages (Hindi, the Vernaculars, English and Assamese) in different scripts."
- The adoption of Assamese as the official language of the State will adversely affect the opportunities and prospects of the Hills people in the government services and other avocations notwithstanding any amount of safeguards which can always be circumvented."
- "There is no justification for the declaration of Assamese as the official language even from the population point of view, as less than 50% of the population have Assamese as their mother tongue."
- "The move has already created discord, disruption and violence among the different language groups of the State, thereby defeating the very purpose which an official language is intended to serve."
- "The imposition of the language by law will create more chaos and insecurity in this frontier state especially in the view of Chinese aggression."
- "Assam being India-in-miniature, inhabited by people of diverse races, cultures and languages, the proper official language should be Hindi. Meanwhile English should continue as the official language until such time as the people of the State as ready to adopt Hindi as the official language."

The resolution addressed the issues of the policy but offered a council of action to be formed to accomplish the goals of the resolutions. The council was proposed to consist of delegates from the United Khasi-Jaintia Hills, Garo Hills, North Cachar Hills and the Mizo district. The delegates of the Mizo district's council of action were proposed to be A. Thanglura, Lalmawia, Ch. Chhunga, Ch. Chhunbura, Ch. Saprawnga, Lalthankima and V.L. Tluanga. Copies of the resolution and proposal was forwarded to the president of India, the prime minister, the governor of Assam, the Chief minister of Assam and the press.

=== Nehru's negotiations with the APHLC ===
On 24 November 1960, the delegation of the APHLC met with Prime Minister Nehru on account of the introduction of the Assam language bill into the assembly. Nehru assued that such a bill would not be enforced in the hill area without the consent of the representatives of the hill areas. Assurances were also given for measures to be taken to ensure delegation of powers to enable the hill people to undertake development programs. Nehru originally offered the Scottish Pattern Plan in regards to the demand for a separate hill state in Assam.

The Scottish Pattern consisted of a few key features. The plan was however rejected by eh APHLC. Other hill leaders, such as the Mikir Hills, began to feel alienated and threatened by the possibility of domination by other hill leaders. A dissident group of hill leaders formed the Assam Hill People's Convention to support Nehru's proposal in the 1962 election.

- The first feature would be a regional committee consisting of all the elected members of the Assam Legislative Assembly representing the autonomous hill district similar to the committee by the British House of Commons for Scotland.
- The second feature discussed special development programs of the hill areas under a high powered statutory council. The council would consist of representatives from the hill areas with independence from the chief minister and non tribal leaders with authority over their budget and financed by the Government of India under Article 275.
- The Members of Legislative Assembly presenting the hill areas would form a committee under a hill minister in which no legislation would be applied to the hill region without their consent.
- The hill minister would be the main executive authority of the hill areas with ministers of cabinet rank from any of the hill districts.
- Disagreement between the Hill regional council and legislative assembly will be mediated by the governor of Assam with their own discretion final judgement.
- The plan also offered the possibility of the Sixth Schedule to be amended to enable the district councils and regional councils to get more autonomy.

The Nehru plan was an administrative development plan with a few proposals offered to the APHLC. This plan differed from the Scottish Pattern Plan, which the APHLC rejected. The plan was accepted as a guide map by the APHLC but it failed to be implemented with the onset of the Sino-Indian War and the death of Nehru. In 1972 the reorganization of the northeast followed closer to the Scottish Pattern Autonomy than the Nehru plan. The key features are as follows:

- The sixth schedule was to be retained but amended on the lines recommended by the Hill Advisory Council.
- Each hill district would be represented by one member in the Lok Sabha and the constituency for a member of assembly would be for every population of 40,000. The autonomous district council and the Pawi-Lakher Regional Council would be given wide powers and greater financial assistance.
- The members of assembly from autonomous districts would form a regional committee of the Assam legislative assembly. All proposals relating to legislation concerning the hill areas would be referred by the Assam assembly to the regional once. The regional assembly would be able to initiative legislation proposals and mediated by the Governor of Assam in case of dispute.
- For matters of planning and development, the hill representatives would have direct access to the planning commission and authority over departments relating to agriculture, public words and education.
- The hill people would be given control over grants given under article 275 with the state legislature of Assam having some say over the grants for state revenue.
- English would be official language of the hill areas until replaced at Hindi while the district level will have autonomy to choose their regional language choices.
- The Hill areas would also be given a separate university along with legal provisions to constitutionally protect their interests.

=== Creation of Mizo National Front ===
On the other hand, Vanlawma the founder of the Mizo Union formed the Mizo cultural society. The society was originally apolitical with many members of the Mizo Union right wing and the UMFO who previously held secessionist opinions. The Deputy Commissioner L.S. Ingty observed the development of the Mizo Cultural Society ordered that no government employees were permitted to join the society. This would lead to a slow decline of the organization as it became perceived as a banned party. During the Mautam famine of 1959, Mizo District experienced severe food shortages, and the impact on the Mizo population was profound. Over a hundred people starved to death. Estimations say that around two million rats were killed and collected by the locals.

The Mizo Cultural Council was kept alive by John F. Manliana until Laldenga joined the organization. Laldenga previously left his job as a District Council clerk to become a full time secretary to the organization. Laldenga sidelined Vanlawma and Manliana to reform the organization into the Mizo National Famine Front. The organisation was patronized by Chaliha who preferred to direct famine relief through him than the Mizo Union. Laldenga used the famine relief operations to help Mizos but also to spread his desire for secession with slogans such as "Mizoram for Mizos". The MNFF recruited local youth and sent them to remote villages which were unable to be accessed by other government personnel. This led many rural settlements to accredit Laldenga for providing relief.

Chaliha began to support the Mizo National Famine Front to transition towards a status as a political party. It was even suspected that Chaliha funded Laldenga to form the party as the Mizo Union was considered a 'thorn in his side'. The Mizo National Famine Front published their own paper titled Mizoa Aw (lit. 'Mizo Voice') which expressed secessionist views and criticisms on the Mizo Union. Chaliha financed the paper with ₹1,500. On 30 August 1961 the leaders of the Mizo National Famine Front met at the residence of Manliana where they agreed to transition into a political party. The organization was rechristened as the Mizo National Front to continue their popularity from the MIzo National Famine Front. On 28 October 1961 the MNFF was formally declared as the Mizo National Front. Laldenga was the party president and Vanlawma was the secretary. The objectives of the party were listed as:

- To achieve the highest sovereignty and unit all Mizos into one political boundary.
- To uplift the Mizo position to the highest possible status.
- To preserve and safeguard Christianity.

The party made its secessionist stance clear and even urged youths to join and participate in return for being given arms. Several youth, drivers, conductors, businessmen, ex-chiefs, ex-military and Mizo-Union critics joined the views of the Mizo National Front. Laldenga led the organization with a successful following and expressed himself as a Christian role model who attended Church regularly. Laldenga's military background also led him help form the Mizo National Army, the armed front of the MNF. Laldenga however did not advocate for violence and secession straight away, he focussed on gaining public support through participating in elections.

The earliest members of the MNF were young men and students who volunteered for relief work under the MNFF. The students were given lectures on localistic nationalism and trained to use firearms. They were even trained in signalling as an unofficial signal corps had been historically established on 15 August 1947 for the Mizo language via morse code. The first college in Mizoram was established in 1958. While there were many graduates, there were little to no jobs available for them. Laldenga raised concern of the deprivation of jobs to the Mizos which further increased support. Before 1958, by comparison, many educated Mizos would go to Shillong or mainland India to study and familiarise themselves with India instead of gaining ideas of secessionism. John F. Manliana, as a public works officer, managed to gain a hold of contractors who held secessionist views. The contractors were upset of the red tape imposed by the Indian public works department. They contributed to the MNF monetarily and other resources. Another category of supporters were drivers. This was explained with a cultural comparison. In mainland India the driver's met with plains people who saw the occupation of being a driver as lowly and influenced by casteism while in Mizoram a driver did not encounter such prejudice. Being well paid in Mizoram and being treated unfairly by Indians and even police the drivers contributed to the MNF by transporting goods despite risking their safety. Chiefs also supported the MNF. The MIzo Union which had historically opposed chieftainship had alienated the chiefs to parties such as the UMFO. The chiefs joined the MNF and contributed as active workers, lending support from their families, and planning out a detailed strategy for their operations. Ex-sericemen also supported the MNF. The Mizos joined the army throughout the World Wars. The servicemen in the armies faced discrimination and described being noted as Nepali. The Assam Regiment was also disbanded in 1964-1965 leading to many men being unemployed. Goswami argues that the young men with military mindset and patriotism for Mizoram joined the Mizo National Army and trained the youth.

=== Mizo National Council ===
The newspaper Zalenna had been supportive of the MNF as it was under the ownership of Vanlawma, who was the party's General Secretary. However, after Laldenga relieved Vanlawma of his position in 1962, Vanlawma and other MNF leaders left and formed the Mizo National Council. The group was not a political party but functioned similarly to one. The group advocated non-violence to achieve independence in Mizoram. In 1963 the MNC used Zalenna to advertise the boycott of elections. The two parties began to diverge over time despite possessing a similar goal of independence for the Mizos. The MNF opposed aid from the US sought by Vanlawma to establish a paper mill in Mizoram. Secondly, during the Sino-Indian War, the MNF ceased their demands for independence while the MNC maintained them. The MNF criticised the Naga leaders, while the MNC supported and praised them. The MNF participated in elections, while the MNC encouraged boycotting of elections. The main difference between the two was that the MNF supported violence while the MNC were against it completely.The MNC lacked a hierarchy or organisation structure. It was an informal faction of like-minded individuals who were participants by agreement.

=== 1962 Assam general elections ===
Members of Assam Legislative Assembly
Year	Sr. no.	Name	Constituency
1962 Assam Legislative Assembly election	1.	Williamson A. Sangma	Baghmara
1962 Assam Legislative Assembly election	2.	Hopingstone Lyngdoh	Nongstoin
1962 Assam Legislative Assembly election	3.	Brington Buhai Lyngdoh	Nongpoh
1962 Assam Legislative Assembly election	4.	Enowell Pohshna	Jowai
1962 Assam Legislative Assembly election	5.	Wilson Reade	Shillong
1962 Assam Legislative Assembly election	6.	Nallindra Sangma	Dainadubi
1962 Assam Legislative Assembly election	7.	Stanley D. D. Nichols Roy	Cherrapunji
1962 Assam Legislative Assembly election	8.	Emerson Momin	Tura
1962 Assam Legislative Assembly election	9.	Saprawnga	Lungleh (ST)
1962 Assam Legislative Assembly election	10.	R. Thanhlira	Aijal East (ST)
1962 Assam Legislative Assembly election	11.	C. Chhunga	Aijal West (ST)

In the general elections of 1962 the Mizo Union contested and won two state assembly seats while the third seat went to an Eastern India Tribal Union member of the APHLC which was supported by the Mizo Union. A total of 11 seats of 12 were won in the legislative assembly election by the APHLC. To give credence to their demand for a separate hill state the APHLC ordered its members to resign in protest on 24 October 1962. The date of 24 October 1962 was chosen to be designated as demand day by the APHLC. In the end only seven members resigned including two members of the Mizo Union. The demand day was postponed with the outbreak of the Sino-Indian War to the dismay of the Mizo Union. By-elections were held for the seats with the Mizo National Front contested for. The Mizo National Front put up four candidates for the original legislative assembly elections of which none were won. In the by-elections The MNF won seats in Aizawl West and Lunglei. John F. Manliana defeated Bawichuaka in Aizawl West. Lalmawia defeated Saprawnga in Lungleh by thousands of votes. Aizawl East was maintained under Ch. Chhunga of the Mizo Union. The elections had low voter turnout, attributed to the article in the Zalenna newspaper. The article urged individuals not to vote as a boycott of the inability to achieve a hill state for their own representation. In the 1963 village council election, the Mizo Union defeated the MNF with 228 seats against 145 seats. Remaining seats were distributed with the Congress holding 16, EITU holding 12, and independents holding 10. Thanhlira eventually resigned his seat as he was appointed a member of the Assam Public Service Commission. The by-election for the seat saw MIzo Union President Chunga win the seat despite the MNF's bid for P.B. Rosanga to win. In this election, Sena also attempted to become a member of Indian parliament by running for Silchar. The Silchar Muslims supported Sena but he lost to a congress candidate who secured the Hindu vote at the time.

1962 District Council Results
Name	Party	Subdivision
Lalmawia		Aizawl
Ch. Saprawnga	Mizo Union	Aizawl (Bial I)
Thanghuama	Independent	Aizawl (Bial II)
Pahlira	Mizo Union	Aizawl (Bial III-A)
Kaibuaia	Mizo Union	Aizawl (Bial III-B)
Lalhmingthanga		Aizawl (Bial IV-A)
Thangsuma		Aizawl (Bial IV-B)
Lalnghinglova		Aizawl (Bial V)
V. Rosiama	Mizo Union	Aizawl (Bial VI)
Lalbuaia	Mizo Union	Aizawl (Bial VII)
H. K. Bawichhuaka	Mizo Union	Aizawl (Bial VIII)
Hrangaia	Mizo Union	Aizawl (Bial IX)
Lalnuntluanga		Aizawl (Bial X)
Lalchana		Aizawl (Bial XI-A)
Rochhuahthanga		Aizawl (Bial XI-B)
Bawngbila		Lungleh (Bial XII)
C. Thansiama	Mizo Union	Lungleh (Bial XIII)
Sawia		Lungleh (Bial XIV)
Kiautuma		Lungleh (Bial XV)
Hengmanga		Lungleh (Bial XVI)
Mylai Hlychho	Independent	Lungleh (Bial XVII)
Hari Kristo Chakma	Independent	Lungleh (Bial XVIII)
Unelected Nominated Seats
Zalawra		Aizawl (Mission Veng)
Lalsanga		Lungleh

=== Disassociation of the APHLC ===
The Pataskar Commission was established in New Delhi to examine the political issues of the hill areas and visit Assam to negotiate a final solution with the leaders. The Sino-Indian War led to Khasi and Garo leaders of the APHLC to postpone the Direct Action scheduled for 24 October for demanding the new state in the northeast. The Mizo Union disagreed with this stance as it was seen as a delay of the interests of the northeast and Mizo people. The delays could threaten the success of negotiating with the Pataskar Commission or even lead to a cancellation. The Khasi and Garo leaders maintained their stance and justified it under 'national interests'. A few days later, New Delhi would send a telegram confirming the message that the Pataskar Commission could not visit the northeast due to an unforeseen emergency. This confirmed the views of the Mizo Union who lost confidence in the APHLC and began to drift away from the organization. Nunthara argues that these actions led to the gain in the MNF capturing the constituencies of Aizawl West and Lungleh in the 1963 by election. The Mizo Union would subsequently host a meeting on 10 July 1963 to officially confirm the disassociation from the APHLC and to demand a separate statehood for the Mizo people. The hill state movement lost interest as it was perceived as dominated by the Khasis and Garos.

=== BRTF Incident ===
On 7 January 1964, the paved roads between Aizawl and Lungleh were being widened by the Border Road Task Force (BRTF).The BRTF were encamped in Zamabawk near Aizawl. Mizo girls carrying water and firewood did not like crossing through the camp due to the unsavoury reputation and treatment of previous girls the BRTF had committed. This was a factor of contention for Mizo youths and the BRTF. The BRTF was encamped when one of the personnel named Anil reported to Major Dyebole that his pay had been stolen from him by some Mizo village youths. Without any investigations the Major sent the force to the nearest house known as the property of Hrangzika. Hrangzika was captured in his sleep where he was tied up and taken back to Zemabawk. On their way back the BRTF also took some village Defence Party people and brought them to camp alongside Hrangzika. Word got around of the event and individuals from Aizawl and village councillors pressured the release of the individuals. The Major refused to speak with the village president and members. With no solution or justification from the Major, a party of Mizo youths wrestled the guns from the BRTF. The fight ended at midnight with no casualties at the time. However the next morning the body of Sawma a man from Zemabawk and the Major were found both dead. Sawma's death was treated as a form of martyrdom. His funeral saw individuals carry his body from Zemabawk to Aizawl with the mourners wearing Puandum. Later investigations of the theft showed that Anil had lied of the theft and the charges were dropped against the Mizo youths.

=== Churachandpur Conference ===
The MNF began to mobilize supporters with nationalism. They accused the Mizo Union's decision to join India of political immaturity, ignorance and lack of farsightedness. The newspaper Zalenna operated by R. Vanlawma also expressed similar views alongside the MNF. The MNF also began to use Christian identity in their nationalism by arguing that India is a land of Hindus and that Mizos should reject being absorbed into their influence. The MNF even promoted brawls and fights of Mizos against non-Mizos to further their support. The Mizo Union countered the influence of the MNF by arguing for the separation of the Mizo Hills district from Assam and granting it statehood. The Mizo Union preferred a Gandhian approach and recruitment.

A conference at Churachandpur in Manipur was held by neutral Mizos for the MNF and MU. The MU agreed to postpone for statehood, and the MNF agreed to cease its secessionist demand for a solution within the Indian constitutional framework. The conference resolved to work for the integration of all Mizo areas of the northeast into a single state. In October 1965 the MU met with Lal Bahadur Shashtri and submitted a memorandum to create a Mizoram state. Shashtri assured that a discussion with the chairman of the Hills Areas Commission, H.V Pataskar, would work out the administrative arrangement details. However, Shastri would die in Tashkent soon after, and Pataskar would refuse to consider the demand for a separate state. The Mizo Union would boycott the Pataskar Commission while the MNF would submit a memorandum to the new Prime Minister demanding complete freedom to the Mizos on 30 October 1965. In the end the Pataskar Commission of H.V Pataskar, G.S. Rau and Shankar Prasad advocated for the creation of the Union Territory of Mizoram. The Governor of Assam Vishnu Sahay supported the creation of the Mizo Hills state as a concession to prevent a future insurgency in the region. However, his suggestions were ignored by Chaliha who totally opposed the idea.

=== 1966 Mizo National Front uprising ===
The MNF had continued to prepare itself for an uprising and coup d'état. It trained cadres and prepared for a multi-pronged attack using the Mizo National Army at different government buildings. Sections of the MNF began to advocate for outright violence. The organization did not survive, but to Laldenga, this signalled that an uprising was being anticipated by its members. In 1965, the MNF president and vice president left for Pakistan secretly to work out a plan of action. Laldenga was caught on his return trip and detained by Indian authorities. They were later released on assurance of following 'good conduct'. Laldenga formed a shadow government and began to implement taxes and collect donations from towns and rural centres after being pressured by MNF volunteers.

The Mizo National Front would launch the attack on 28 February 1966 and lasted to 1 March 1966. Violent action took place simultaneously at Aizawl, Lunglei, Vairangte, Chawngte, Chimluang, Kolasib, Champhai, Saireng and Demagiri. The MNF formed a government with Laldenga as president, Lalnunmawia as vice-president, Saingkha as home minister, C. Lalkhawliana as finance minister, R. Zamawia as the defence minister, Ngurkunga as information minister and John F. Manliana as chief justice.

=== Mizo Union reaction ===
The Mizo Union maintained the view that Chaliha had favoured the MNF and allowed it to grow despite warnings and concerns raised by the Mizo Union and other military personnel. The Mizo Union delegates under President Ch. Chhunga, Chief Executive Member of the District Council H.K. Bawichhuaka, General Secretary C. Pahlira met with Indira Gandhi on 22 June 1966. A memorandum was submitted stating that:

"In his bird to overthrow the Mizo Union party, B.P. Chaliha had gone to the extent of lending active and material support to the MNF, an organisation which stood for disintegration of the Union of India... recall that Shri Nanda the Union Home Minister had disclosed in December 1965, that the Government had taken measures to strengthen the Border Security Force to block the movement of Laldenga's volunteers to whom, it then admitted, the Pakistan authorities had given arms and training, and again Shri Nanda had reaffirmed, as late as February 1966, that in December 1965, about 200 trained volunteers had returned to Mizo Hills from Pakistan; and you will also remember that it was only as late as the early morning of 1st March 1966 that Laldenga's men had actually made 'war'. During all this Shri Chaliha must have forgotten his allegiance to the Constitution of India in his bid to crush the Mizo Union."

— Mizo Union, Memorandum to the Prime Minister 22 June 1966, The Mizo uprising: Assam Assembly debates on the Mizo movement 1966-1971 (2012)

=== Operation accomplishment ===
In January 1967 the Government of India adopted a groping policy for the Mizo district proposed by Sam Manekshaw. The government initially was against it before the military lobbied for the adoption of the policy which became known as Operation Accomplishment. Multiple phases of grouping were carried out which lead to 80% of the rural population shifted from their villages and resettled along the highways.

The fundamental objective of the policy was to isolate the insurgents physically and politically from the rest of the population. The main factors in selecting a site for the regrouping centre were a good water supply, good hygienic condition, sufficient land for agriculture, communication facilities, minimum mobilisation of the people and security.

The first phase of grouping were Protective and Progressive Villages (PPVs). This was built in ten weeks along the Silchar-Kolasib-Aizawl-Lungleh national highway. The policy saw 106 villages placed onto 18 grouping centres affecting 52,210 people. The administration of the centres were placed under the Assam civil service who would become an administrative officer. The second phase was the New Groping Centre. It was established 1969 under the Assam Maintenance of Public Order Act 1953. It managed the area of the tripura border, Lungleh-Lawngtlei road, Darngawn-Bungzung North, Vanliaphai-Serchhip Road and Seling-Champhai Road. A population of 97,339 from 184 villages were regrouped into 40 centres. The third phase, known as Voluntary Grouping Centres, was in August 1970 under the Assam Maintenance of Public Order Act 1953. It saw 26 grouping centres for a population of 47,156. The fourth phase, known as Extended Loop Areas, was planned for 63 villages to be settled into 17 grouping centres for 34,219 people. The third and fourth phases of regoruping were challenged in Chuanvawra v the State of Assam and others. The Gauhati High Court asked to justify the continuation of the policy which the Government of Assam assured no further implementation of the grouping policy would be made.

=== 1967 Assam general election ===
The Mizo Union did not contest the 1967 election for two main reasons. The first reason was that the Mizo National Front uprising had led to an uptick in violence in which campaigning and political activities were not advisable to carry out. Secondly the Mizo Union continued to support the idea of statehood being granted to the Mizos. As a result, the term of the district council members was extended to 1970, when the next elections would be held. During the 1966-1969 period the suspension of political activities would weaken the Mizo Union and lead to an era of influence for the Mizo congress party.

=== Developments of Mizo Congress ===
A. Thanglura, the founder and president of the Mizo Congress, became a member of the legislative assembly and thus stationed in Shillong. In his absence, Dengthuama became convenor and later elected president of the Mizo District Congress Committee. However, the district council suffered from internal faction rivalry. Dengthuama led the first group and the other group was led by Hrangchhuana, the treasurer of the Mizo Congress. As a result of the rivalry, the Assam Pradesh Congress Committee President, Mr Bhagwatti, visited Aizawl. His decision saw Hrangchhuana made convenor of the Mizo District Congress Committee. However, Dengthuama was reelected as the president in the general meeting of the Mizo District Congress Committee in 1970. The rivalry resumed, becoming recognised as a leadership dispute rather than an ideological one. The Assam Pradesh Congress Committee would make Hrangchhuana ad-hoc president of the Mizo District Congress Committee again. This decision was influenced by Thanglura, a minister in the Assam government and former president of the Mizo District Congress Committee, as he favoured Hrangchhuana despite Dengthuama being elected as president of the MDCC twice. As Dengthuama's faction was filled with District Council members and Chief Executive Members his faction was considered the true Mizo Congress. hrangchann's faction was referred to as "Vai congress" or "stooge of Assam Congress". Hrangchanna's faction was also described as claiming to represent the Mizo identity similar to the MNF at the time. However, the two rival groups reconciled in 1970 to unite against the Mizo Union and succeeded in becoming the dominant ruling party.

Hrangchanna's faction attempted to ally with the Mizo Union which led to a no confidence vote against Dengthuama's faction. The vote was successful and Hrangchanna's faction came out on top with the Mizo Union. However friction between both organizations due to Hrangchanna's failure to delegate district council seats to the Mizo Union as promised. As a result the Mizo Union allied with Dengthuama's faction and formed a coalition government known as the United Mizo Parliamentary Party (UMPP).

=== Fourth District Council elections ===
The fourth district council elections were held on 18 April 1970. The outcome of the elections saw the north become Congress-aligned.

Name	Party	Subdivision
Ch. Chhunga	Mizo Union	Aizawl
Z.V. Lalmawia	Mizo Congress	Aizawl
Tuikhurliana	Mizo Union	Aizawl
Vaivenga	Mizo Union	Aizawl
R. Thangliana	Mizo Union	Aizawl
P.C. Saprema	Mizo Congress	Aizawl
Lalhruaia	Mizo Union	Aizawl
Khuma	Mizo Congress	Aizawl
J. Thanghuama	Mizo Congress	Aizawl
Lalbuaia	Mizo Union	Aizawl
Sapnela	Mizo Congress	Aizawl
Hrangaia	Mizo Union	Aizawl
Lalhuzauva	Mizo Congress	Aizawl
F.C. Nghina	Mizo Congress	Aizawl
Zalawma	Mizo Congress	Aizawl
Thangchungnunga	Mizo Congress	Lungleh
Ch. Saprawnga	Mizo Union	Lungleh
K. Thansiama	Mizo Congress	Lungleh
Sangchema	Independent	Lungleh
Mylai Hlychho	Independent	Lungleh
Hari Kristo Chakma	Independent	Lungleh
C. Thansiama	Independent	Lungleh
Nominated Unelected Seats
C.L. Ruala	Mizo Congress	
Ralzatawna	Mizo Congress	

=== United Mizo Parliamentary Party ===
The president of the Mizo Union, Ch Chhunga became the chief executive officer of the coalition government. In 1971 the village councils elections were held in which the Mizo Union held their influence as 66 of 158 villages aligned. Ii is argued that the Mizo Union became the dominant faction of the UMPP.

The UMPP held a session on 14 April 1971 which passed a resolution declaring that to bring the Mizo tribes together, including ones outside of Mizoram, under one administration the UMPP will request the central government to grant statehood on the basis of long-lasting peace. As a result Ch, Chhunga, Zalawma, K. Thansiama and Lalbuaia met with the prime minister, Indira Gandhi, in mid of May 1971. A memorandum was passed with a demand for statehood for a full-fledged Mizoram state incorporating the areas inhabited by the Mizos in Cachar, Manipur and Tripura.

=== Faction rivalry and global developments ===
Developments of the Mizo National Front began a political school to raise awareness of global history, politics, administration and finance. The educated members of the MNF began to give out lectures. However as a result of this policy an intellectual faction in the MNF emerged. The rumours and rivalry led to a belief that a military coup could occur within the MNF itself. Laldenga held a tea party of the top MNF officials at his residence in Chhantlang on 11 March 1971 to alleviate tensions and create unity among the MNF. However, the meeting saw Biakchunga accuse the Army Chief and Defense Minister, R. Zamawia, of planning a military coup with the officer of the Mizo National Army to overthrow Laldenga.

On 25 March 1971, the Mukti Bahini insurgents of East Pakistan started an independence liberation movement against the Government of Pakistan. The East Pakistan government was a vital aspect of the MNF's source of weapons and funds to reinforce their military activities. With the outbreak of the Bangladesh Liberation War, the MNF evacuated their camps on 4 April 1971.

The Anti-Laldenga faction became known as the Dumpawl (Blue party), which became more popular. On 10 May 1971, Laldenga arrested the Dumpawl faction, and by 17 May, the number of prisoners under the MNF prison was increased to 40. Laldenga also ordered a suspension order of the Mizo National Army officers on 28 May. The independence of Bangladesh on 16 December 1971 prompted the bases to be cleared. The new government of Bangladesh was friendly to India and hence withheld all support for the MNF. Laldenga, with approval of the MNF, sent a second diplomatic mission under R. Zamawia and Lalnunmawia on 18 December to open peace talks with Indira Gandhi.

=== Union Territory of Mizoram ===
On 17 July 1971, S.J Das, Commissioner of Cachar the Central Liaison Officer for the Mizo District came to Aizawl with a proposal of the central government to confer the status of Union Territory on Mizoram. Discussion were held at the residence of the deputy commissioner of the Mizo district on the same day with 17 representatives of the UMPP agreeing to submit a memorandum to express their appreciation of the central government's proposal.

The Proposal (dated Aizawl, the 17th July, 1971) of Union Territory status for Mizoram district was discussed. In view of the present circumstances prevailing in this part of the country, it was felt by leaders that the decision of the Government of India in granting the Union Territory Status to Mizo Hills was a reasonable proposal for the Central Government to make. The political leaders, however, felt that clarification on certain points was required. For this purpose, it was imperative that a delegation consisting of ten members should go to Delhi. It was further suggested by the Minister of State, Home Affairs, Government of India, should visit the District to get first-hand knowledge.

— Memorandum of United Mizo Parliamentary Party to the Central Government, Mizoram: Society and Polity (Nunthara, 1996)

The Chief Executive Member of the Pawi-Lakher Regional Council, Zakhi Hlychho, also agreed with the proposal for Union Territory status on the condition that a separate autonomous District Council provision is provided for the Pawi (Lai) and Lakher (Mara). The president of Demagiri Congress Committee, Christo Mohan Chakma, argued that a separate district council for Chakmas should be established to protect their distinct tradition and culture. The Mizo District Congress Committee urged the central government to make a peace settlement with the MNF before the Union Territory be finalised. The youth wing of the Mizo Union led by Muankima, Dosanga and Biakchhawna submitted their separate memorandum. The memorandum stated support for Union Territory status on account of it being a transitory period to full statehood for Mizoram in the future. Disagreements, however between the Mizo Union youth and the UMPP would lead to disassociation and the formation of the Mizo Union Council in 1971.

== See also ==
- History of Mizoram
- North-Eastern Areas (Reorganisation) Act, 1971
- Mizo National Front uprising

== Sources ==
- Agnihotri, S. K. (1996), "Constitutional Development in North-East India since 1947", in B. Datta-Ray; S. P. Agrawal (eds.), Reorganization of North-East India Since 1947, Concept Publishing Company, pp. 57–92, ISBN 978-81-7022-577-5
- Chatterjee, Suhas (1990). Mizo Encyclopaedia. Aizawl: Jaico Publishing House.
- Goswami, B.B (1979). The Mizo Unrest: A Study of Politicisation of Culture. Jaipur: Aalekh Publishers.
- Hluna, John V.; Tochhawng, Rini (2012). The Mizo Uprising: Assam assembly debates on the Mizo Movement. 1966-1971. Cambridge University press.
- Nag, Sajal (2015). Nehru and the North East (PDF). New Delhi: Nehru Museum and Library. ISBN 978-93-83650-81-1.
- Nag, Sajal (2019). "Autonomy without Power: Nehru and the Critique of Sixth schedule on autonomy". Federalism and Federal Studies in 21st Century.
- Nunthara, C (1996). Mizoram: Society and Polity. New Delhi: Indus Publishing Company. ISBN 81-7387-059-4.
- Rustomji, Nara (1971). Enchanted Frontiers. London: Oxford University Press.
- Verghese, C.G.; Thanzawna, R.L. (1997). A History of the Mizos. New Delhi: Vikas Publishing House.
- Zarzosanga (5 January 2024). Political parties in mizoram: A case study of the Mizo National Front. Newcastle Uupon Tyne: Cambridge Scholars Publishing. ISBN 978-1-5275-6259-2.
- Zorema, J. (2007). Indirect Rule in Mizoram: 1890-1954. New Delhi: Mittal Publications. ISBN 978-81-8324-229-5. OCLC 271837683. OL 48056042M.
