= Zoram =

Zoram may refer to:

== Organizations ==
- Zoram Decentralisation Front, an Indian political party
- Zoram Medical College, a medical school in Mizoram, India
- Zoram Nationalist Party, an Indian political party
- Zoram People's Movement, an Indian multi-party political coalition
- Zoram Reformation Front, an Indian political party
- Zoram Thar, an Indian political party

== People ==
- Zoram, a figure in First Nephi
- Zoram, a name shared by two figures in the Book of Alma
- Zoramthanga (boxer), Indian boxer
