= History of Mizoram =

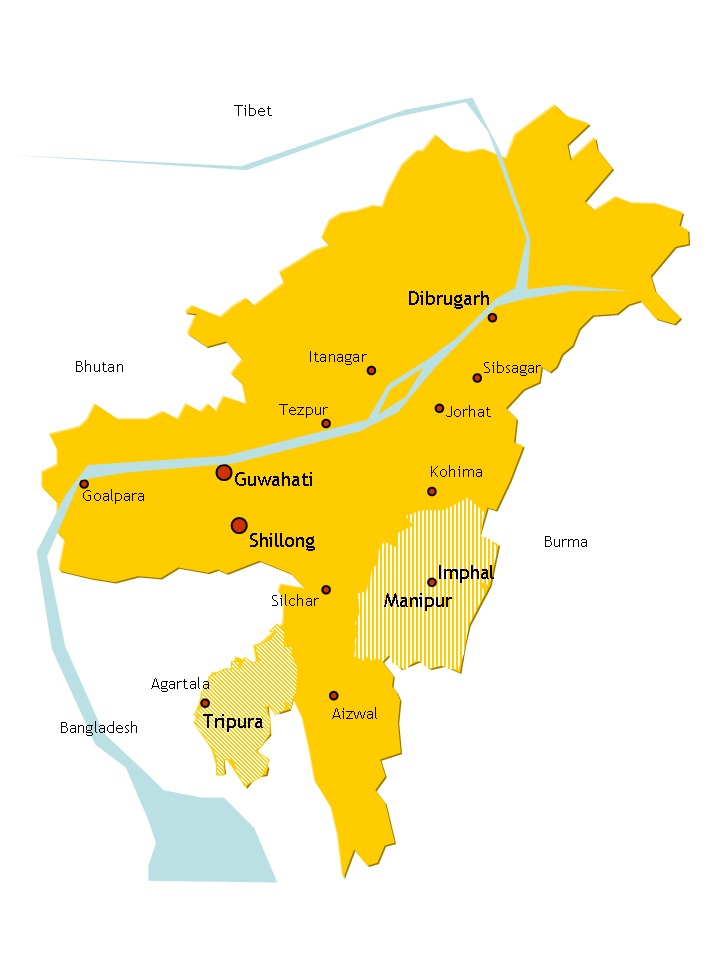
Mizoram was a part of the Assam state in the 1950s

The history of Mizoram, which lies in the southernmost part of northeast India, encompasses several ethnic groups of Chin people who migrated from Chin State of Burma. Information about patterns of westward migration are based on oral history and archaeological inferences. The recorded history started relatively recently, around the mid-19th century when the adjoining regions were occupied by the British monarchy. Following religious, political and cultural revolutions in the mid-20th century, a majority of the people agglomerated into a super tribe, Mizo. Hence the officially recognised settlement of the Mizos became Mizoram.

The earliest documented records of Mizoram were from British military officers in the 1850s, when they encountered a series of raids in their official jurisdiction in Chittagong Hill Tracts from the neighbouring natives. By then they referred to the land as Lushai Hills. As a consequence of relentless tribal encroachment which often resulted in deaths, the British subjugated the tribal chiefdoms. Punitive British military expeditions in 1871 and 1889 forced the annexation of the entire Lushai Hills. After the Indian independence from British Empire in 1947, the land became Lushai Hills district under the Government of Assam. In 1972 the district was declared a union territory and was given the more culturally inclusive name Mizoram. Ultimately Mizoram became a full-fledged federal state of India in 1986.

== Origin of the inhabitants ==
The ancestors of Mizos were without any form of written language before the advent of British. They were anthropologically identified as members of the Tibeto-Burman ethnicity. Folk legends unanimously claim that there was Chhinlung or Sinlung at the cradle of the Mizos. Oral history provided contrasting accounts on the origin.

1. One popular legend tells that the Mizos emerged from under a large covering rock known as Chhinlung (literally "rock cover").
2. Another version says that Chhinlung refers to the Chinese city of Sinlung or Chinlingsang situated close on the Sino-Burmese border. According to Mr. K. S. Latourette, there were political upheavals in China in 210 B.C.E. when the dynastic rule was abolished and the whole empire was brought under one administrative system. The Mizos left China as part of one of those waves of migration. However, this is pure speculation.
3. According to Vumson's Zo history, the earliest ancestor of the Mizos was Thlapa, the eldest son of Ngaihte, whose son was Lamhlir and grandson was Seipui/Lusei.
4. A different story presented by Historians such as Liangkhaia, Hrangṭhiauva and Lal Chungnunga is that in Tibet there was born a three brothers named Mizoa, Mirua and Marua. Leading nomadic life they mostly settled in Chinzua (Chen-Yuan) in China. The descendants of Mizoa migrated to Sakai in Burma. In due course of time they had a great chief called Chhinglunga, and his chiefdom came to be known as Chhinlung.

Speculated to be in around the 5th century they settled in the Shan State after having overcome the resistance put up by the indigenous people. They thrived in Shan state for about 300 years before they moved on the Kabaw Valley around the 8th century. It was in the Kabaw Valley that Mizos had cultural influence with the local Burmese. It is conceivable that the Mizos learned the technique of cultivation from the Burmese at Kabaw as many of their agricultural implements bore the prefix Kawl, a name given by the Mizos to the Burmese.

Khampat (now in Myanmar) was known to have been the next Mizo settlement. They are said to have planted a banyan tree before they left Khampat as a sign that the town was made by them. In the early 14th century, they moved westward to Indo-Burmese border. They built villages and called them by their clan names such as Seipui, Saihmun and Bochung. The hills and difficult terrains of Chin Hills forced division into several villages and ethnic diaspora arose.

== Lushai Hills ==
The first people to arrive to present-day Mizoram were the Zeliangrong Nagas who were called as Mirong by the Zo people, they inhabited northern Mizoram such as Champhai and Kolasib. Later on, the earliest Mizo people entered India and were known as Old Kukis (Tribes such as Hmar, Biate, Darlong and Hrangkhawl), the second batch of Mizo immigrants were called New Kukis. The Lushais were the last of the Mizo tribes to migrate to the Lushai Hills in India. By the time they crossed the Tiau River bordering Myanmar, the descendants of Zahmuaka, who came to be known as the ruling Sailo clan, had proven their mettle as able and assertive chiefs. The traditional system of village administration, too, had been perfected. As the head of the village, the Chief or Lal allocated lands for cultivation, settled all disputes in the villages, fed and cared for the poor and offered shelter to anyone seeking refuge. The Mizo history in the 18th and 19th centuries is marked by many instances of tribal raids and retaliatory expeditions.

== British rule ==
=== Initial encounters ===
By the mid-19th century British Empire had occupied all the surrounding Chittagong and Burma but had little or no interest in the tribes or their hilly land. They were merely mentioned in passing as "irreclaimable savages". The tribals then lived in small and isolated clusters of chiefdoms, sometimes raising warfare against another. Their religious lives were dominated by paganism and they led an animistic world view, with a unique concept of afterlife called Pialral. They practised elaborate rituals including animal sacrifice, and worshipped or feared almost all conceivable inanimate objects, diseases and unusual natural phenomena. The first Lushai (the British misnomer for Lusei) raid recorded in British governed Assam was in 1826. From that year to 1850 the local officers were unable to restrain the fierce attacks of the hillmen on the south. Raids and outrages were of yearly occurrence, and on one occasion the Magistrate of Sylhet reported a series of massacres by "Kookies" in what was alleged to be British territory, in which 150 persons had been killed. The raid was most severe in 1871 when a series of attacks caused several deaths on both sides, with extensive damage on the plantations. A number of workers and soldiers were taken prisoners, and among them a six-year-old Mary Winchester. Mary Winchester was taken as hostage by Bengkhuaia warriors, while other prisoners were executed on the way.

=== British military expeditions ===
To retaliate the British military organised punitive expedition named Lushai Expedition in 1871–1872. The campaign consisted two columns, the right advancing from Chittagong and the left from Cachar. General Brownlow, C.B., commanded the former, with Captain T.H. Lewin, Superintendent of the Chittagong Hill Tracts, as Civil Officer. The Cachar column was led by General Bourchier, C.B., with Mr. Edgar, Deputy Commissioner, Cachar, as Civil Officer. In addition, a contingent of Manipuris accompanied by Colonel James Nuttall, the Political Agent of Manipur, made a demonstration across the southern border to co-operate with General Bourchier's portion of the expedition. The expedition started on 15 December 1871. The Mizo villages were crushed one by one, and Mary Winchester was rescued. Mizo chiefs made a truce not to make further attacks. Frontier posts were built to protect the border and bazaars were opened to encourage the Lushais to trade. After a decade the truce was broken, and there erupted intermittent raids again. In 1889 British military organised another punitive expedition code named "The Expedition of 1889". It was commanded b Col. F.V.C. Tregear. From their camping site at Chawngte they started on 19 December 1888. They easily penetrated the southern villages with little resistance. They fortified at Lunglei and prepared locations and roads for the next expedition. After their completing their mission, they returned in April 1889. Then the major campaign called The Chin-Lushai Expedition 1889-90 immediately followed. Again divided into two columns, Chittagong column was commanded by Col. Tregear, and Cachar column by W.W. Daly. The Chittagong column occupied most of the southern region including Chin Hills by the end of 1889. The Cachar column camped at Aijal (now Aizawl) on 30 January 1890. They subjugated all the major chiefdoms, captured the chiefs and got permanently fortified in Aizawl and Lunglei, as the administrative centres.

=== Lushai Hills ===
Lushai Hills were formally declared as part of British India by a proclamation in 1895. North and South Hills were united into Lushai Hills district in 1898, with Aizawl as its headquarters. The British following the policy of non-interference, did not interfere in the existing institutions of Mizo chieftainship. In 1898-1899 the British introduced 'Land Settlement' for chieftainships and demarcating the jurisdiction of chiefs. This was the furthest extent of interference the British would pursue until later significant political development. The Lushai Hills District was excluded from British law in civil and criminal legal codes. The institution of chieftainships was further protected with the introduction of the Inner Line Regulation 1873 and Chin Hills Regulation 1896, which required plains people to have permission to enter and stay in the hills district.

In 1901-1902 the British introduced the circle administration system. This system subsequently divided the Lushai Hill district into 18 circles administered by a circle interpreter. Circle interpreters were educated individuals from missionary schools who functioned as intermediaries between chiefs and British administrators. The accumulation of wealth from these educated circle interpreters would also lead to a new privileged class different from traditional elitism in chiefdoms. This would become a precursor to political development in Mizoram such as the Young Mizo Association and the Mizo Union.

The process of the consolidation of the British administration in the tribal dominated area in Assam started in 1919 when Lushai Hills, along with some of the other hill districts, was declared a "Backward Tract" under the Government of India Act 1919. The tribal districts of Assam, including the Lushai Hills, were declared "Excluded Area" by the Government of India Act 1935. It was during the British regime that a political awakening among the Mizos in Lushai Hills started taking shape. The first political party, the Mizo Common People's Union, was formed on 9 April 1946. The Party was later renamed the Mizo Union. As the day of Independence drew nearer, the Constituent Assembly of India set up an advisory committee to deal with matters relating to the minorities and the tribal members. A sub-committee, under the chairmanship of Gopinath Bordoloi was formed to advise the Constituent Assembly on the tribal affairs in the North East. The Mizo Union submitted a resolution of this Sub-committee demanding inclusion of all Mizo-inhabited areas adjacent to Lushai Hills. However, a new party called the United Mizo Freedom Organisation (UMFO) came up to demand that Lushai Hills join Burma after Independence.

== Christianity and education ==
The Mizo ancestors had no written language and in terms of religion they worshiped nature and revered natural phenomena. The first missionary who came to Lushai Hills was Rev. William Williams, a Welsh missionary who at that time was working in Khasi Hills (now Meghalaya). However he came only on an investigative visit for a week in March 1891. On 11 January 1894, F.W. Savidge and J.H. Lorrain, commissioned by Arthington Aborigines Mission, arrived at Aizawl. This marked the origin of formal education and Christianity in Mizoram. They made camp at Thingpui Huan Tlang, Zarkawt ("Tea Graden"), later named MacDonald Hill, Zarkawt. They immediately worked on creating Mizo alphabets based on Roman script. After only two and half months, Savidge started the first school on 1 April 1894. Their first and only pupils were Suaka and Thangphunga. They translated and published the Gospels of Luke and John, and Acts of the Apostles. They also prepared A Grammar and Dictionary of the Lushai language (Dulien Dialect) which they published in 1898, and became the foundation of Mizo language. In 1903 Baptist Missionary Society (BMS) of London set up Baptist church by sending Lorrain and Savidge at Serkawn, near Lunglei. From there they expanded the church, education and health services. Rev. Reginald Arthur Lorrain, younger brother of Rev. J.H. Lorrain and founder of the Evangelical Church of Maraland was the first pioneering missionary to the Mara people at the southern extreme of Lushai Hills. He entered Maraland (now includes southern end of Mizoram and adjoining Chin State of Burma) and settled at Serkawr (Saikao) village on 26 September 1907. Lorrain created alphabets, prepared Bible and textbooks in Mara. With his mission the task of evangelising and educating the mass of the Mizo people was complete.

Due to the rise in Christianity traditional practices such as Chapchar Kut began to decline. Social change with the establishment of educational institutions also undermined and led to the decline of Zawlbuks. While Christian missionaries did not abolish or prohibit the institution of zawlbuks, parents of the evangelised generation preferred pursuit in modern education standards and social mobility. The decline of Zawlbuks also created the foundations for the educated class of Mizoram who would eventually go on to found the Young Mizo Association.

== Autonomous District Council ==
Following the Bordoloi sub-committee's suggestion, a certain amount of autonomy was accepted by the government and enshrined in the Six Schedule of the Indian Constitution. The Lushai Hills Autonomous District Council came into being in 1952 followed by the formation of these bodies led to the abolition of chieftainship in the Mizo society. The autonomy however met the aspirations of the Mizos only partially. Representatives of the District Council and the Mizo Union pleaded with the States Reorganization Commission (SRC) in 1954 for integration of the Mizo-dominated areas of Tripura and Manipur with their District Council in Assam. The tribal leaders in the northeast were laboriously unhappy with the SRC recommendations. They met in Aizawl in 1955 and formed a new political party, Eastern India Tribal Union (EITU) and raised their demand for a separate state comprising all the hill districts of Assam. The Mizo Union split and the breakaway faction joined the EITU. By this time, the UMFO also joined the EITU and then understanding of the Hill problems by the Chuliha Ministry, the demand for a separate Hill state by EITU was kept in abeyance.

== Mautam famine ==
In 1959, Mizo Hills was devastated by a great famine known in Mizo history as 'Mautam Famine'. The cause of the famine was attributed to the flowering of bamboos which resulted in a boom in the rat population. It caused mass destruction of food stores and crops. A number of people died of starvation. Earlier in 1955, Mizo Cultural Society was formed with Pu Laldenga as its secretary. In March 1960, the name of the Mizo Cultural Society was changed to 'Mautam Front' to fight against the famine. In September 1960, the Society adopted the name of Mizo National Famine Front (MNFF). The MNFF gained considerable popularity as a large number of Mizo Youth assisted in transporting rice and other essential commodities to interior villages.

== Insurgency ==
After recovery from the disaster the Mizo National Famine Front was changed to a new political organisation, the Mizo National Front (MNF) on 22 October 1961. The specified goal was sovereign independence of Greater Mizoram. It resorted to armed insurrection with the 28 February 1966 uprising against the Government, attacking the government installations at Aizawl, Lunglei, Chawngte, Chhimluang and other places. In Aizawl, on 5 and 6 March 1966, the Government of India bombed the city of Aizawl with Toofani and Hunter Jet fighters, this was the first time India used its air force to quell a movement of any kind among its citizens. "The next day, a more excessive bombing took place for several hours which left most houses in Dawrpui and Chhinga veng area in ashes", recollected 62-year-old Rothangpuia in Aizawl. The Mizo National Front was outlawed in 1967 and the demand for statehood increased. The Mizo District Council delegation met prime minister Indira Gandhi in May 1971 and demanded full-fledged statehood for Mizoram. The Indian government offered to convert the Mizo Hills into a Union Territory (UT) in July 1971. On 21 January 1972 official declaration of UT was made with the name Mizoram. Mizoram was allotted two seats in Parliament, one each in the Lok Sabha and in the Rajya Sabha.

== Birth of Mizoram state ==
Election of Rajiv Gandhi to the office of Prime Minister of India in 1984 incited the beginning of a new era in Indian politics. Laldenga met the prime minister on 15 February 1985. Terms of negotiations were resolved between the two parties. The Mizoram Peace Accord (the official document entitled Mizoram Accord, 1986, Memorandum of Settlement) was therefore signed between the Mizo National Front and the Union Government on 30 June 1986. Signatories were Pu Laldenga from MNF, the Union Home Secretary R.D. Pradhan on behalf of the government and Lalkhama, Chief Secretary of Mizoram. Statehood was a prerequisite of the accord so that Mizoram became a federal state of India on 20 February 1987.

== See also ==
- History of Christianity in Mizoram
- Education in Mizoram
