= 1962 Indian general election =

- 19–25 February 1962

494 of the 508 seats in the Lok Sabha (Note: 14 members were appointed, including six representing Jammu and Kashmir, two representing Anglo-Indians, one representing the Amindive, Laccadive and Minicoy Islands, one representing the Andaman and Nicobar Islands, one representing Dadra and Nagar Haveli, one representing Goa, Daman and Diu, one representing the North-East Frontier Agency and one representing the Tuensang and Naga Hills districts in Nagaland.) 248 seats needed for a majority
- Registered: 216,361,569
- Turnout: 55.42% (▲9.98 pp)
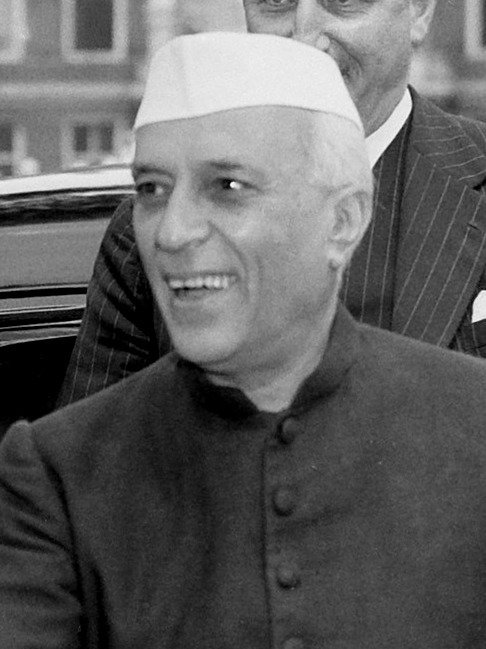

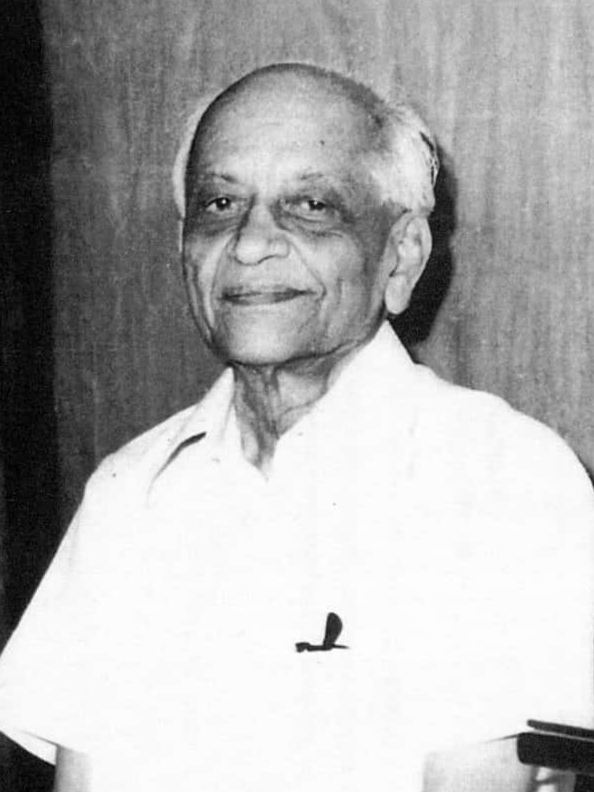

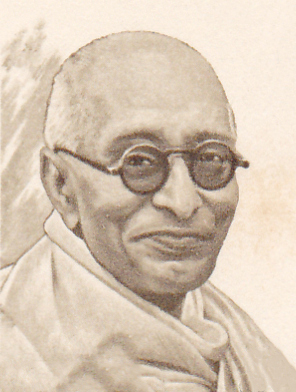

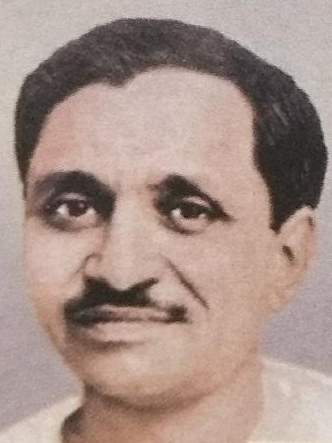

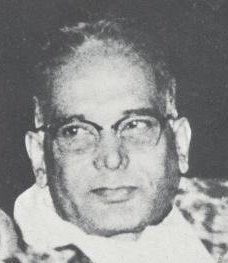
	First party	Second party	Third party
Leader	Jawaharlal Nehru	Shripad Amrit Dange	C. Rajagopalachari
Party	INC	CPI	SWA
Last election	47.78%, 371 seats	8.92%, 27 seats	New
Seats won	361	29	18
Seat change	▼10	▲2	New
Popular vote	51,509,084	11,450,037	9,085,252
Percentage	44.72%	9.94%	7.89%
Swing	▼3.06pp	▲1.02pp	New
	Fourth party	Fifth party
Leader	Deendayal Upadhyaya	Jayaprakash Narayan
Party	ABJS	PSP
Last election	5.97%, 4 seats	10.41%, 19 seats
Seats won	14	12
Seat change	▲10	▼7
Popular vote	7,415,170	7,848,345
Percentage	6.44%	6.81%
Swing	▲0.47pp	▼3.60pp
- Results by constituency
Prime Minister before election
Jawaharlal Nehru
INC
Prime Minister after election
Jawaharlal Nehru
INC

General elections were held in India between 19 and 25 February 1962 to elect members of the third Lok Sabha. Unlike the previous two elections, each constituency elected a single member.

Jawaharlal Nehru won another landslide victory in his third and final election campaign. The Indian National Congress received 44.7% of the vote and won 361 of the 494 elected seats. This was only slightly lower than in the previous two elections and they still held over 70% of the seats in the Lok Sabha.

== Results ==
Party	Votes	%	Seats	+/–
Indian National Congress	51,509,084	44.72	361	–10
Communist Party of India	11,450,037	9.94	29	+2
Swatantra Party	9,085,252	7.89	18	New
Praja Socialist Party	7,848,345	6.81	12	–7
Bharatiya Jana Sangh	7,415,170	6.44	14	+10
Republican Party of India	3,255,985	2.83	3	New
Socialist Party	3,099,397	2.69	6	New
Dravida Munnetra Kazhagam	2,315,610	2.01	7	New
Shiromani Akali Dal	829,129	0.72	3	New
All India Forward Bloc	826,588	0.72	2	0
Hindu Mahasabha	747,861	0.65	1	0
Peasants and Workers Party of India	703,582	0.61	0	–4
Akhil Bharatiya Ram Rajya Parishad	688,990	0.60	2	+2
Jharkhand Party	467,338	0.41	3	–3
Revolutionary Socialist Party (RSP)	451,717	0.39	2	+2
Indian Union Muslim League	417,761	0.36	2	New
All India Ganatantra Parishad	342,970	0.30	4	–3
Lok Sewak Sangh	281,755	0.24	2	New
Nutan Maha Gujarat Janata Parishad	195,812	0.17	1	New
Haryana Lok Samiti	118,667	0.10	1	New
Tamil National Party	92,389	0.08	0	New
All Party Hill Leaders Conference	91,850	0.08	1	New
Tamilnad Socialist Labour Party	80,227	0.07	0	New
Revolutionary Communist Party of India (RCP)	60,813	0.05	0	New
Gorkha League	46,127	0.04	0	New
Eastern Indian Tribal Union	12,574	0.01	0	New
We Tamil	11,372	0.01	0	New
Independents	12,722,488	11.05	20	–22
Appointed members (Note: Six representing Jammu and Kashmir, two representing Anglo-Indians, one representing the Amindive, Laccadive and Minicoy Islands, one representing the Andaman and Nicobar Islands, one representing Dadra and Nagar Haveli, one representing Goa, Daman and Diu, one representing the North-East Frontier Agency and one representing the Tuensang and Naga Hills districts in Nagaland.)			14	+3
Total	115,168,890	100.00	508	+3
Valid votes	115,168,890	96.05		
Invalid/blank votes	4,735,394	3.95		
Total votes	119,904,284	100.00		
Registered voters/turnout	216,361,569	55.42		

=== State wise ===
==== Andhra Pradesh ====
Party	Seats			Popular vote		
Party	Contested	Won	+/−	Votes	%	±pp
Indian National Congress	43	34	▼3	57,11,263	47.96%	▼3.51%
Communist Party of India	20	7	▲5	25,05,619	21.04%	▲9.03%
Swatantra Party	28	1	▲1	17,75,495	14.91%	New
Independents	44	1	▼1	16,53,436	13.89%	5.37% ▼
Total	43			1,19,08,021		

==== Assam ====
Party	Seats			Popular vote		
Party	Contested	Won	+/−	Votes	%	±pp
Indian National Congress	12	9	▼4	57,11,263	45.16%	▼6.52%
Praja Socialist Party	8	2	Steady	4,78,099	19.16%	▼0.8%
All Party Hill Leaders Conference	1	1	New	91,850	3.68%	New
Communist Party of India	4	0	▲5	1,76,098	7.06%	▼3.19%
Independents	13	0	▼1	5,16,793	20.71%	▲2.6%
Total	12			24,95,311		

==== Bihar ====
Party	Seats			Popular vote		
Party	Contested	Won	+/−	Votes	%	±pp
Indian National Congress	53	39	▼2	43,65,148	43.89%	▼0.58%
Praja Socialist Party	32	2	Steady	12,62,106	12.69%	▼8.95%
Swatantra Party	43	7	New	18,11.170	18.21%	New
Communist Party of India	16	1	▲5	6,34,516	6.38%	▲1.36%
Independents	34	0	▼1	4,93,330	4.96%	▼10.88%
Total	53			99,46,244		

==== Gujarat ====
Party	Seats			Popular vote		
Party	Contested	Won	+/−	Votes	%	±pp
Indian National Congress	22	16	-	27,76,327	52.56%	-
Swatantra Party	14	4	-	13,20,405	25.0%	-
Praja Socialist Party	6	1	-	3,74,813	7.1%	-
Nutan Maha Gujarat Janata Parishad	3	1	-	1,95,812	3.71%	-
Independents	14	0	-	4,69,020	8.88%	-
Total	22			52,82,558		

- Gujarat was formed a new state in 1961 after separation from Bombay state.

==== Madras ====
Party	Seats			Popular vote		
Party	Contested	Won	+/−	Votes	%	±pp
Indian National Congress	41	31	Steady	56,23,013	45.26	▼1.26%
Dravida Munnetra Kazhagam	18	7	▲7	23,15,610	18.64	New
Communist Party of India	14	2	Steady	12,72,313	10.24	▲0.18%
Swatantra Party	16	0	New	13,00,526	10.47	New
Independents	46	0	▼8	9,33,150	7.51	▼32.26%
Total	41			1,24,24,036		

== By-elections ==
In 1963 a by-election was held for the Bilaspur Lok Sabha seat. The by-election was won by the Indian National Congress candidate Chandrabhan Singh, with 86,229 votes, against M. L. Shukla of Jana Sangh with 54,156 votes. This by-election was needed because the original election for this seat was declared void by the Madhya Pradesh High Court, which judged that the nomination papers of one of the candidates, Bashir Ahmed Qureshi, "was improperly and illegally rejected by the Returning Officer".

== See also ==
- List of members of the 3rd Lok Sabha
- 1962 Indian general election by state or union territory
- 1962 Indian presidential election
