= Macmillan Byrsat =

Indian politician

Macmillan Byrsat (born 1 January 1974) is an Indian politician from Meghalaya. He is a former member of the Megalaya Legislative Assembly from the Nongstoin Assembly constituency, which is reserved for the Scheduled Tribe community in the West Khasi Hills district, representing the National People's Party in 2018.

== Early life ==
Byrsat is from Nongstoin, West Khasi Hills district, Meghalaya. He is the son Tomroy Lyngdoh. He completed his B.A. at a college affiliated with North Eastern Hills University In 1996. He declared assets worth Rs.6 crore in his affidavit to the Election Commission of India.

== Career ==
Byrsat won the Nongstoin Assembly constituency 2018 Meghalaya Legislative Assembly election representing the National People's Party. He polled 9,284 and defeated his nearest rival, Gabriel Wahlang of the Indian National Congress, by 60 votes.
