= Assam (1947–1963) =

State of India from 1947 to 1972

State of Assam
- State of India
- 1947–1972
- Flag Coat of arms

- Assam in India (1951)
- Capital: Shillong
- Area
- 121,908 km^{2} (47,069 sq mi)
- 202,270 km^{2} (78,100 sq mi)
- History
  - Establishment: 15 August 1947
  - Nagaland separated: 1 December 1963
  - Meghalaya became an autonomous state: 2 April 1970
  - Meghalaya became a state: 21 January 1972
  - Mizoram became a Union Territory (Note: Union Territory of Mizoram): 21 January 1972
  - Arunachal Pradesh became a Union Territory (Note: In 1914, the Government of British India established the Northeast Frontier Agency as a special administrative area under Assam Province. Following Indian independence, it remained under the administration of the Governor of Assam and the Government of Assam as part of Assam. In 1972, the territory of the Northeast Frontier Agency was constituted as the Union Territory of Arunachal Pradesh.): 21 January 1972
  - Present-day Assam established: 21 January 1972
Preceded by
Assam Province
Succeeded by
Assam
Nagaland
Meghalaya
Mizoram
Arunachal Pradesh

Undivided Assam refers to the then undivided greater state of Assam in India soon after the Indian Independence in 1947 until 1972. In addition to the present-day Assam, it included the current states of Arunachal Pradesh, Meghalaya, Nagaland and Mizoram. The capital of this state was Shillong, currently the capital of Meghalaya. Undivided Assam included five of the seven contiguous states of Northeast India—with Tripura and Manipur not being a part of it.

Prior to the Partition of India, Sylhet was a part of Assam.

Undivided Assam had a total area of 234,568 km^{2} (90,567 sq mi) which is slightly smaller than the nation of Ghana. The present day population of Undivided Assam would be 50 million which is slightly less than the population of South Korea.

Map of Assam in 1960

== Present day ==
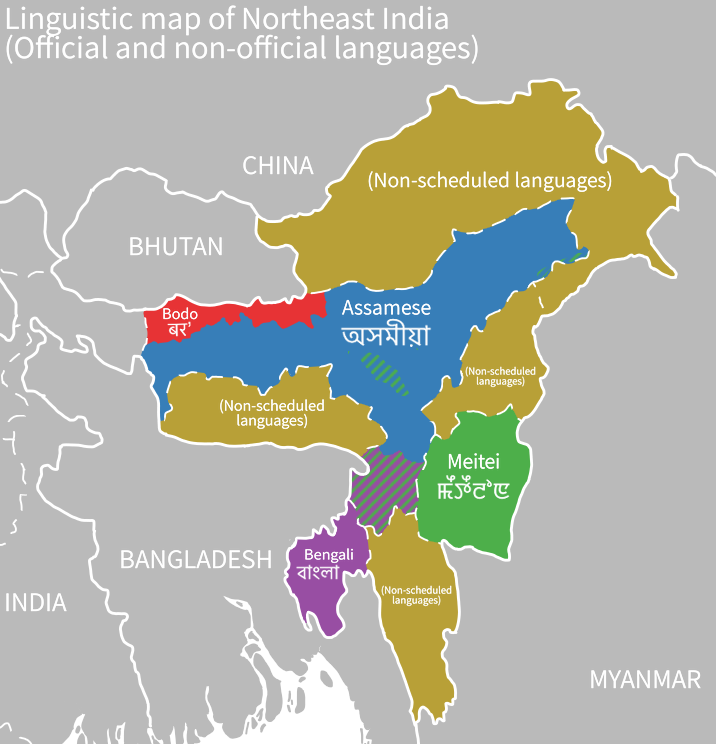
"Scheduled" and "non-scheduled" official languages of Northeast Indian states

After the partition, Undivided Assam was carved into following states:

Date	State/UT	Country	Note
15 Aug 1947	Assam	India	Became states of Republic of India
1 Dec 1963	Nagaland	India	Became states of Republic of India
2 Apr 1970 : as an autonomous state 21 January 1972	Meghalaya	India	Became states of Republic of India
21 Jan 1972 : as a union territory 20 February 1987	Mizoram	India	Became states of Republic of India
21 Jan 1972 : as a union territory 20 February 1987	Arunachal Pradesh	India	Became states of Republic of India
