= Hopingstone Lyngdoh =

Indian politician (1929–2015)

Deputy Chief Minister of Meghalaya
- In office 20 March 2008 – 19 March 2009

Member of Meghalaya Legislative Assembly
- In office 1972–2015
- Succeeded by: Diostar Jyndiang
- Constituency: Nongstoin

Personal details
- Born: 15 March 1929 Nonglait Village, Mawthadraishan Tehsil, West Khasi Hills district
- Died: 26 September 2015 (aged 86) NEIGRIHMS, Shillong, Meghalaya, India
- Party: HSPDP
- Occupation: Politician

Hopingstone Lyngdoh (15 March 1929 – 26 September 2015) was an Indian politician who was the president of the Hill State People's Democratic Party (HSPDP), one of three official political parties of the state of Meghalaya in India.

== Early life ==
On 15 March 1929, Hopingstone was born on Hajur Shon at Nonglait village in present-day West Khasi Hills district. He studied at St. Anthony's College, Shillong. As a child, he grew up in a poor household and suffered from visual impairments. He lost his father when he was five. His grandfather cured him of his blindness. Thereafter, he worked as a cow herder in his village.

== Political life ==
At the time of his death, he was the oldest serving representative member in Meghalaya and had never been defeated in a legislative assembly election. For a brief period he also was a Member of Parliament in 1977. He was actively associated with educational organisations and their programmes, and had fought single-handedly against uranium mining in the State.

Beside the political arena, he was an agriculturist, school teacher and social worker; he was the president of the Hill State People's Democratic Party, previously associated with the Eastern India Tribal Union since 1957, it was renamed the All-Party Hill Leaders Conference in 1960. He was also a member of the United Khasi Jaintia Hills Autonomous District Council from 1957 to 1972, as well as a member of the Assam Legislative Assembly from 1962 to 1968 and the Meghalaya Legislative Assembly from 1972 until his death.

== Death ==
The 86-year-old veteran and most decorated politician of his time, Lyngdoh, who represented the Nongstoin constituency of West Khasi Hills district in the Assembly, died on September 26, 2015, at the Northeast Indira Gandhi Regional Institute of Medical and Health Sciences (Neighrims) in Shillong. He died of pneumonia, sepsis and multiple organ failure. He was buried at Mawkyllei village in West Khasi Hills district of Meghalaya.
