= Political parties in Tripura =

Overview of Political Parties in Tripura

The following is a list of political parties in the India

== Major national parties ==
- Bharatiya Janata Party (BJP)
- Indian National Congress (INC)
- Communist Party of India (Marxist) (CPIM)

== Major Regional parties ==
- Tipra Motha Party or The Indigenous Progressive Regional Alliance (TIPRA) of Maharaja Kirit Pradyot Deb Barman
- Indigenous People's Front of Tripura (IPFT) of N.C. Debbarma

== Minor national parties ==
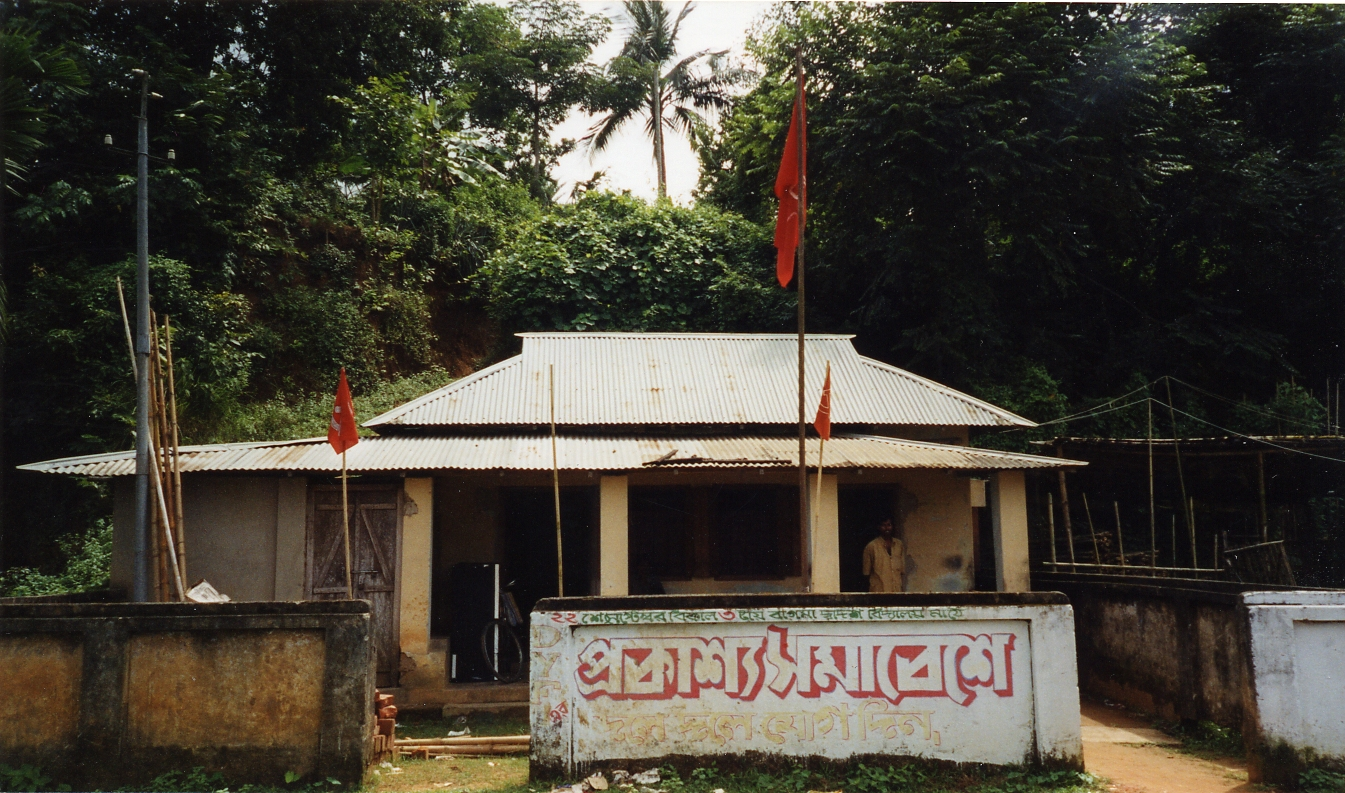
Office of the CPM

- All India Trinamool Congress
- Communist Party of India (CPI)
- Revolutionary Socialist Party (RSP)
- All India Forward Bloc (AIFB)

== Minor Regional parties ==
- Indigenous People's Front of Tripura (Balaram Debbarma) (IPFT-B) of Balaram Debbarma
- Twipra Dophani Sikla Srwngnai Motha (TDSSM) of David Hamkhrai Twipra (DH Murasing)
- Tripura United Indigenous Peoples Council (TUIPC)
- Joint Action Committee of Civil Societies of Tripura (JACCST)
- Tripura People's Party (TPP)
- National Socialist Party of Tripura (NSPT) {alliance partner of Left Front}
- Ganamukti Parishad (GMP), affiliated with Communist Party of India (Marxist) as tribal wing.
- Janganotantrik Morcha (JM)
- Tripura Ganatantrik Manch (TGM)
- Amra Bangali (AM)

Note: There is a move to merge regional tribal parties like IPFT(Balaram Debbarma), TDSSM, TUIPC and JACCST with The Indigenous Progressive Regional Alliance (TIPRA) of Maharaja Kirit Pradyot Deb Barma

== Defunct Political Parties ==
- Tripura Rajya Muslim Praja Majlish (TRMPM)
- Tripura Upajati Juba Samiti (TUJS) split to form INPT and IPFT
- Tripura National Volunteers (TNV) merged with IPFT
- Tripura People's Front (TPF) of Patal Kanya Jamatia merged with the Bharatiya Janata Party
- Indigenous Nationalist Party of Twipra (INPT) merged with TIPRA
- National Conference of Tripura (NCT) merged with TIPRA
- Tipraland State Party (TSP) merged with TIPRA
- Indigenous People's Front of Tripura (Tipraha) or IPFT-(Tipraha) led by Aghor & Binoy Debbarma, merged with TIPRA

== See also ==
- 2018 Tripura Legislative Assembly election
- 2023 Tripura Legislative Assembly election
- Political parties in Mizoram
