= Zoram Thar =

Political party in Mizoram, India

Zoram Thar (New Mizoram) was an Evangelist political party in Mizoram, India. The president of Zoram Thar was V. L. Nithanga.

Zoram Thar contested the 1998 state assembly elections together with Mizo National Front (Nationalist) and Citizens Common Front.
