= Lai People's Party =

Political party in Mizoram, India

Lai People's Party was a political party in the Indian state of Mizoram. LPP was active in the Chhimutuipui West district. The party was founded in 1996. It was based among the Lai (Pawi) people, and demanded a separate Lairam Union Territory. As of 1996 the party president was F. Manghnuna and L. Chinzah the party vice president. Z. Hengmang, who had been the first chairman of the Pawi-Lakher Regional Council in 1953, took part in the founding of LPP and remained its senior advisor until his death in 2004.

In 1996 a LPP delegation met with Prime Minister H.D. Deve Gowda, presenting a memorandum asking for a separate Union Territory.

LPP held one (of 27) seat in the Lai Autonomous District Council.
