= Citizens Common Front =

Former Indian political party

Citizens Common Front, was a political party in Mizoram, India. CCF was formed by a group of Christian leaders. Its chairman was Rev. Lalpianga. CCF contested the 1998 state assembly elections together with Mizo National Front (Nationalist) and Zoram Thar. The Common Front's H Lallungmuana, an Independent candidate, was supported by all Front parties MNF (Nationalist) now called ZNP, and MPC, and he beat his closest rival John Lalsangzuala of the Congress in a six-cornered contest.
