= Gabriel Wahlang =

Indian politician

Member of the Meghalaya Legislative Assembly
- Incumbent
- Assumed office 2023
- Preceded by: Macmillan Byrsat
- Constituency: Nongstoin

Personal details
- Born: Meghalaya, India
- Party: National People's Party
- Other political affiliations: Indian National Congress

Gabriel Wahlang is an Indian politician from Meghalaya. He serves as a member of the Meghalaya Legislative Assembly representing Nongstoin. He belongs to the National People's Party.
