= Mizoram (union territory) =

Former union territory of India (1972–1987)

Union Territory of Mizoram Mizoram
- Union Territory of India
- 1972–1987
- Capital: Aizawl
- Population
  - 1971: 292,386
  - 1981: 493,757
- Government
- Chief Minister
  - 1972–1977: C. Chhunga
  - 1978: T. Sailo
  - 1979–1984: T. Sailo
  - 1984–1986: Lal Thanhawla
- Historical era: Cold War
  - Union Territory established: 21 January 1972
  - Mizoram Peace Accord: 30 June 1986
  - Statehood: 20 February 1987
Preceded by	Succeeded by
Mizo District	State of Mizoram
- Today part of: Mizoram

The Union Territory of Mizoram, spanning from 1972 to 1987, was formed as a response to the Mizo people's demand for greater autonomy. During this time period, reforms in administration and preservation of Mizo culture started.

== Background ==
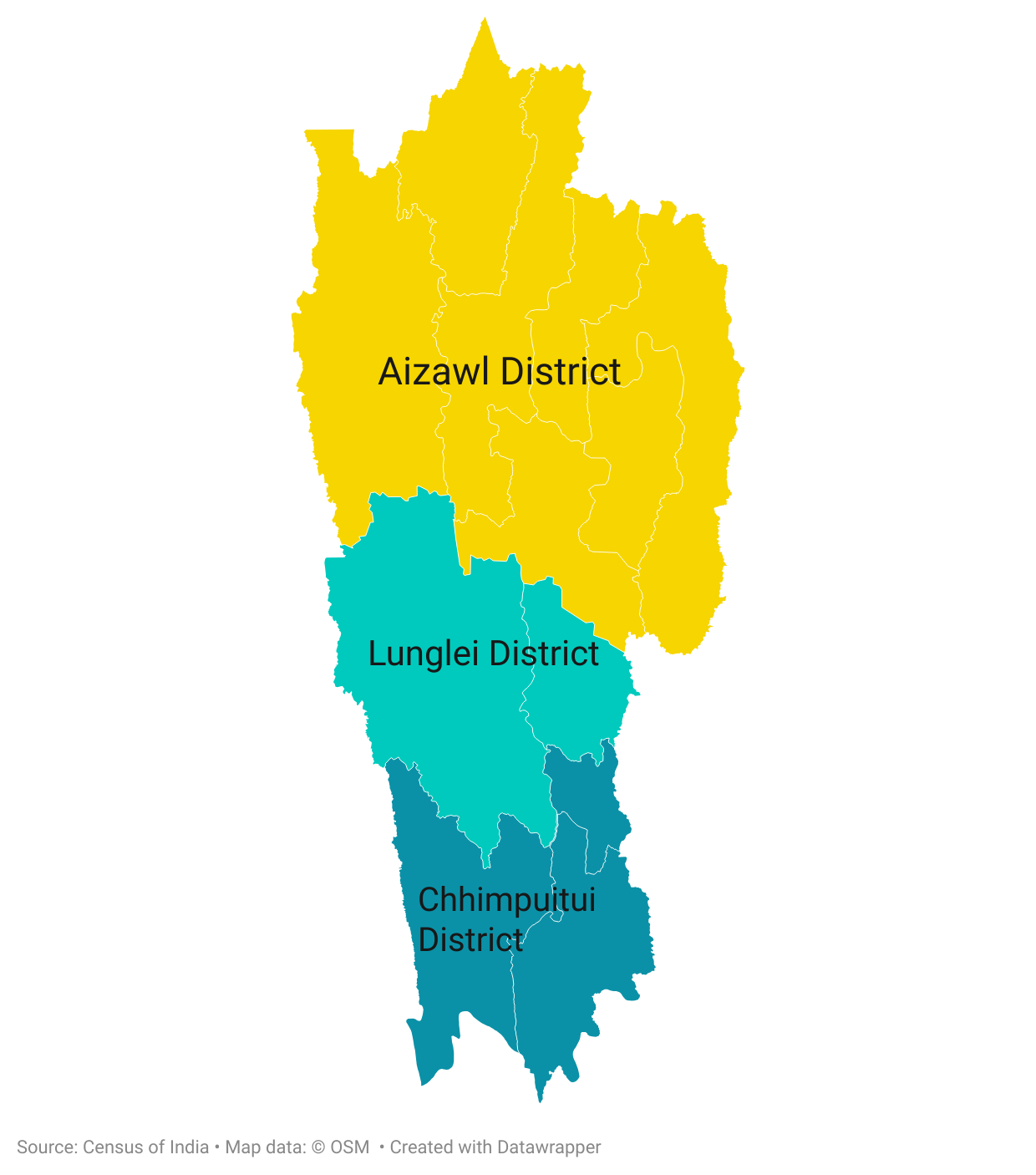
Districts of Union Territory of Mizoram 1981

The Mizo National Front (MNF), formed in 1961, sought to address the perceived neglect and exploitation of the Mizo people by the central government. The insurgency led to unrest, conflicts, and demands for political autonomy. The North-Eastern Areas (Reorganisation) Act, 1971 stripped the Mizo district from the administration of the State of Assam. The formation of the Union Territory was part of a broader effort to recognise and respect the unique cultural and historical identity of the Mizo people.

The Union Territory of Mizoram was established with three administrative districts. Namely Aizawl, Lunglei, and Chhimpuitui.

== History ==
=== Union Territory Elections ===
The creation of the territory saw the formation of new political parties such as the Mizo Integration Party and the Mizo National Party. Pahlira broke with Chhunga and Sprawnga of the Mizo Union and formed the Mizo National Union. Shortly after formation both parties would merge to form the Mizo Labour Party and compete in the elections. Other parties at the time would include the Socialist Party which was established as a branch in Mizoram and the Mizo Democratic Front. The elections saw the Mizo Union win 21 of the 30 assembly seats. Mizo Congress won 6 seats. Three independents from Southern Mizoram filled the final remaining seats. The Mizo Labour Party and the Socialist party failed to establish any seats and as a result decided to merge into the Mizo Congress to oppose the Mizo Union.

=== Chhunga's administration ===
In the 33 member legislative assembly election Ch. Chhunga became chief minister of Mizoram with the Mizo Union. S.P. Mukherjee was appointed lieutenant Governor of the union territory. In the village councils the Mizo Congress captured a total of 85% of the seats. Inspired by the Nagaland Peace Council, a Mizoram Peace Council was formed by Reverend Zairema as president and Lalthanhawla as secretary. Chhunga would be sworn in as the chief minister on 3 May 1972.

=== Autonomous districts ===
In 1972, the Pawi-Lakher Region was redrawn into three autonomous administrative districts. The district was difficult to administrate due to the multiple languages of minorities living together. A Pawi autonomous district was made for the Lai people, a Lakher autonomous district for the Mara people and a Chakma autonomous council. Despite the Lai and Mara being Tibeto-Burman groups with cultural similarities to the Mizo people and being Christian, they considered themselves separate. The Chakma people were not Tibeto-Burman derived, had their own script and believed in Buddhism rather than Christianity. Chakma people also arrived across the border from the Chittagong Hill Tracts after the violence between Shanti Bahini and the Bangladesh Armed Forces. These refugees stayed in camps on the Mizoram border until 1986, in which, after statehood, the refugees were forcibly deported back to Bangladesh amidst the continuing conflict by Indian military personnel.

=== Motion of No-Confidence ===
A motion of no confidence was moved against the Mizo Union government of Ch. Chhunga by J. Thanghuama of the Mizo congress and Zalawma on the grounds of administration. Leave to move the motion was granted on 3 October 1973. The motion was discussed for two days on 8-9 October 1973 in which 18 members participated. J. Thanghuama the leader of the opposition alleged that corruption had become increasingly rampant compared to earlier administrations. Thanghuama criticised the conduct of the administration and their lack of responsibility of duties entrusted. Thanghuama would point out the shortcomings in various departments of the government and claimed the motion of no-confidence would encourage the administration to work harder for Mizoram. Zalawma stated that a motion of no-confidence was important to highlight the inability of Chhunga's ministry to run various departments. Zalawma also questioned why non-Mizos were placed as department heads instead of Mizos, who knew the territory and land better and were ready to serve. Ch. Chhunga would defend himself by stating he was not surprised at the move of no-confidence by the opposition. The Ministry had only begun to work, and the opposition members must understand the difficulties faced in development and Mizoram's unique geography and lack of skilled personnel. Referring to the rehabilitation of MNF returnees, he claimed efforts were being made to promote peace and security, and a scheme for rehabilitation was being considered. The debate, lasting eight hours and forty minutes, lead to the outcome of the motion. The motion was defeated, with six members voting in favour and twenty-six voting against.

=== Mizo cultural revival ===
In the Autonomous Mizo District, foreign missionaries held influence on the Church alongside local leaders. However, in 1973, the central government's decision to expel foreign missionaries led to a relaxation in the repression of Indigenous Mizo culture. The revival of traditional Mizo culture wasn't brought with the Church's approval; rather, the students and youth organizations took the initiative and revived Chapchar Kut in this era. Chief Minister C. Chhunga adorned the traditional Mizo attire and inaugurated the 1973 Chapchar Kut. The festival became Christianized with former traditional of zu (rice beer) not used and new dance formations such as David's star.

=== Mizo Union merger with the Mizo Congress ===
The creation of the union territory led to changing the Mizo Hills district committee to the Mizoram Pradesh Congress committee. Lalthanhawla was elected president of the MPCC. The Mizo Union depended on the central government for its policies and funding and made a choice to merge with the Mizo Congress. The All India Congress Committee on 13-14 November 1973 approved of the merger with the approval of Indira Gandhi. On 24 February 1974 the merger emerged as the Mizoram Pradesh Congress. Lalthanhawla was elected president of the MPCC with Saprawnga as the vice president.

=== Protest against Non-Mizo officials ===
The emergence of a Mizo government was led by a few non-Mizo officers initially in the higher positions and roles. During 1972-1973 Mizo officers including of the IAS occupied more subsidiary roles. In late 1973 and early 1974 the students at Pachhunga University College (at the time known as Pachhunga Memorial Government School) led a protest. The protest was against G.N. Chatterjee the director and secretary of education.

=== Developments under Chhunga ===
The Mizo Pradesh Congress was influenced by MNF individuals who returned to civilian life from violence. Their lack of education and political experience had led to friction with members of the old Mizo Union. As a result, Chhunga's old party began to oppose him and his policies in government. A faction of individuals formed to oppose the merge,r while Chhunga commanded a faction of his pro-mergers supporting the new party. As the first chief minister of Mizoram, Chhunga held funds at his disposal but was not functional in addressing demands for peace with the MNF. The situation escalated as individuals of the MNF began to take advantage of the inaction. Major Kapchhunga and Captain Lalhelia of the MNF set up a parallel administration in Aizawl and demanded taxes and donations with even some officials from Chhunga's government acceding. Both Mizos and non-Mizos were described as following the MNF as officials as de facto rulers. Chhunga attempted to negotiate with the MNF with no fruitful outcomes or effect. The rebels were emboldened and even attempted to assassinate Lieutenant governor S.P. Mukherjee. The MNF began relations with the Chinese Communist Party of Burma and reinforced themselves in their new hideout in Arakan.

Chhunga took special measures to curb the insurgency of the MNF. The measures were successful as violent incidents began to recede considerably and 293 hostiles were arrested with 12 light machine guns recovered. However, the harshness of the security forces occupation and policy in Mizoram alienated support from the Mizos.

=== Murder of the Aizawl Police chief ===
G.S Arya, the police chief of Mizoram held a meeting of the top police officials on 13 January 1975 to review law and order in Mizoram. Arya was already name in the hitlist of Kapchhunga and Lallehia. The meeting was attended by the DIG L.B. Sewa and the SP Special Branch K. Panchapakesan. A jeep load of MNF rebels led by Lalleiha entered the building and shot all three police officials with Chinese made guns and escaped without resistance. This murder would escalate tensions and shock officials. As no non-Mizo stood guard at the building, suspicion of MNF infiltration into the government and other institutions began to form. This would ultimately discredit Ch. Chhunga's administration. Surendra Nath the IGP of Kashmir was assigned to Aizawl as the chief secretary. Lalleiha would be killed by captain Lal, which returning home from visiting his mistress. However this act would make Lalleiha a martyr for the MNF.

=== People's Conference ===
On 17 April 1975, Brig T. Sailo launched the People's Conference as a new political party in Mizoram. The People's Conference were popular due to the Human Rights Commission Sailo had established earlier with the abuse of the military personnel stationed in Mizoram. Initially the party's goal was to end the conflict between the MNF and the Indian government and pursue human rights justice. Being non-INC and popular in Mizoram, T. Sailo was one of the leaders arrested during the state of emergency in 1975. Sailo had approached Laldenga and advised him to not lay down arms without first reaching a political settlement. The government discovered this and placed him in prison. T. Sailo wrote to the government pleading for pardon and stating him wanting to give up on politics. However he was released and Laldenga wrote that he suspected an agreement had been reached for this to occur.

=== Mizoram Peace Council ===
Reverend Zairema of the Mizoram Peace Council tried to restore calm of the situation. A peace mission arrived at Aizawl on 9 May 1975 under the leadership of M. Aram with the message of peace. The peace mission was backed by the Government of India. The mission met with military personnel, and political parties before recommending the Government of India to cooperate for a peace negotiation with the MNF. However this would occur as Indira Gandhi would declare a state of emergency in India. As a result the priority of peace in Mizoram became less important.

=== Fall of the Chhunga administration ===
The infighting of the Congress since the Mizo Union's merger continued to grow over time. Chhunga's ability to lead the party became difficult with growing discontent and disunity. Purabi Mukherjee, the General Secretary of the All India Congress Committee, was sent to Aizawl by Indira Gandhi but returned to Delhi describing a bad impression of the Mizo Congress organization. The Mizo Congress was described as becoming increasingly careerist apart from Lalthanhawla, who showed potential to Mukherjee. Most of the Congress Party favoured replacing Chhunga as the Chief Minister of Mizoram. Chhunga's attempts to ally with his party members saw them harass him by aligning with the views of the Mizo National Front. The returnees joining the party contained links to the Mizo National Front. The Chhunga cabinet resigned on 9 May 1978. President's rule was imposed in Mizoram on the same date. Before his resignation, Chhunga requested the Chief Secretary and Finance Secretary not to neglect the Mizo economy.

An evaluation of Chhunga's government from 1972-1978 shows economic growth in Mizoram. Chhunga himself had focussed on economic development in Mizoram. While he failed to attain political goals regarding peace with the Mizo National Front, Chhunga succeeded in growing the fiscal revenue of the Mizo Hills in the final years of his term. Chhunga's cabinet has also been described as cleaner than administrations following his in terms of transparency and corruption.

=== Mizo Customary Law Committee ===
In 1980 the Mizo Customary Law Committee was formed and in 1982 the Mizo Customary Laws compiling committee was set up. The committee consisted of Mizo elders, intellectuals and Christian pastors who tried to standardize Mizo customary law after the abolishment of chieftainship in 1954. The Mizo Hmeichhe Insuihkhawm Pawl was founded in 1976 as the largest women's body in Mizoram. Their political policy tended to focus on the resentment of male-biased Mizo customary laws. The MHIP lobbied for reforms of Mizo customary laws to divorce, inheritance, and sawn-man (compensation for the mother of an illegitimate child).

One of the most significant administrative achievements during this period was the signing of the Mizoram Peace Accord in 1986. This accord brought an end to years of insurgency, contributing to political stability and laying the foundation for further development and governance reforms.

== Sources ==
- Chatterjee, Suhas (1994). Making of Mizoram: Role of Laldenga. new Delhi: M D Publications. ISBN 81-85880-38-7.
- Malhotra, G.C. (2004). Cabinet Responsibility to legislature: Motions of Confidence and No-confidence in Lok Sabha and State legislatures. India: Lok Sabha Secretariat. ISBN 9788120004009.
- Nunthara, C (1996). Mizoram: Society and Polity. New Delhi: Indus Publishing Company. p. 42. ISBN 81-7387-059-4.
- Puia, Roluah (2023). Nationalism in the vernacular: State, Tribes and Politics of Peace in Northeast India. Cambridge: Cambridge University Press. doi:10.1017/9781009346061. ISBN 978-1-009-33954-4.
