= Mizoram People's Party =

Mizoram People's Party (MPP) was a former regional political party in Mizoram, India. In 2018, the party merged with Zoram People's Movement.
