= Nongstoin Assembly constituency =

Legislative Assembly constituency in Meghalaya State, India

Coordinates: 25.53°N 91.25°E

Nongstoin
- Constituency No. 32 for the Meghalaya Legislative Assembly

Constituency details
- Country: India
- Region: Northeast India
- State: Meghalaya
- District: West Khasi Hills
- Lok Sabha constituency: Shillong
- Established: 1972
- Total electors: 43,120
- Reservation: ST

Member of Legislative Assembly
- 11th Meghalaya Legislative Assembly
- Incumbent Gabriel Wahlang
- Party: NPP
- Alliance: NDA
- Elected year: 2023
- Preceded by: Macmillan Byrsat

Nongstoin is one of 60 Legislative Assembly constituencies of Meghalaya state in India. It is part of the West Khasi Hills district and is reserved for candidates belonging to Scheduled Tribes. As of 2025, its representative is Gabriel Wahlang of the National People's Party.

== Members of the Legislative Assembly ==
Year	Member	Party
Assam
1952	Ajra Singh Khongphai	Independent politician
1957	Henry Cotton	Independent politician
1962	Hopingstone Lyngdoh	All Party Hill Leaders Conference
1967	Hopingstone Lyngdoh	All Party Hill Leaders Conference
Meghalaya
1972	Francis K. Mawlot	Independent politician
1978	Endro Lawphniaw	Hill State People's Democratic Party
1983	Hopingstone Lyngdoh	Hill State People's Democratic Party
1988	Hopingstone Lyngdoh	Hill State People's Democratic Party
1993	Hopingstone Lyngdoh	Hill State People's Democratic Party
1998	Hopingstone Lyngdoh	Hill State People's Democratic Party
2003	Hopingstone Lyngdoh	Hill State People's Democratic Party
2008	Hopingstone Lyngdoh	Hill State People's Democratic Party
2013	Hopingstone Lyngdoh	Hill State People's Democratic Party
2015★	Diostar Jyndiang	Hill State People's Democratic Party
2018	Macmillan Byrsat	National People's Party
2023	Gabriel Wahlang	National People's Party

★Bye election

== Election results ==
=== Assembly Election 2023 ===
2023 Meghalaya Legislative Assembly election: Nongstoin
Party	Candidate	Votes	%	±%
INC	Gabriel Wahlang	13,847	35.26%	▲6.87
NPP	Macmillan Byrsat	11,223	28.58%	▲0.00
UDP	Polestar Nongsiej	7,505	19.11%	New
VPP	Bobby Boldrick Kharchandy	3,755	9.56%	New
HSPDP	Sanjied Kynsai Shangrit	1,390	3.54%	▼18.81
AITC	Macmillan Kharbani	1,091	2.78%	New
BJP	Diosstarness Jyndiang	253	0.64%	▼0.57
NOTA	None of the Above	364	1.48%	▲0.33
Margin of victory		2,624	6.68%	▲6.50
Turnout		39,273	91.08%	▼1.16
Registered electors		43,120		▲22.42
INC gain from NPP		Swing	▲6.68	

=== Assembly Election 2018 ===
2018 Meghalaya Legislative Assembly election: Nongstoin
Party	Candidate	Votes	%	±%
NPP	Macmillan Byrsat	9,284	28.58%	▲26.14
INC	Gabriel Wahlang	9,224	28.39%	▼6.95
HSPDP	Diosstarness Jyndiang	7,261	22.35%	▼23.23
PDF	Goodleaderson Nongsiej	5,224	16.08%	New
BJP	Arphul Kharbani	393	1.21%	New
NOTA	None of the Above	231	0.71%	New
Margin of victory		60	0.18%	▼10.06
Turnout		32,488	92.24%	▲2.71
Registered electors		35,222		▲31.49
NPP gain from HSPDP		Swing	▼17.01	

=== Assembly Election 2013 ===
2013 Meghalaya Legislative Assembly election: Nongstoin
Party	Candidate	Votes	%	±%
HSPDP	Hopingstone Lyngdoh	10,931	45.58%	▲7.80
INC	Adviser Pariong	8,475	35.34%	▲20.60
UDP	Nasar Marwein	3,864	16.11%	▼1.29
NPP	Setsingh Dkhar	584	2.44%	New
Independent	Mathiewly Nongrem	127	0.53%	New
Margin of victory		2,456	10.24%	▼9.79
Turnout		23,981	89.53%	▲9.82
Registered electors		26,786		▼23.45
HSPDP hold		Swing	▲7.80	

=== Assembly Election 2008 ===
2008 Meghalaya Legislative Assembly election: Nongstoin
Party	Candidate	Votes	%	±%
HSPDP	Hopingstone Lyngdoh	10,537	37.78%	▲1.71
Independent	David Hamar Marwein	4,949	17.74%	New
UDP	Francis K. Mawlot	4,855	17.41%	▲9.56
INC	J. T. Stormding Thongni	4,111	14.74%	▼18.95
NCP	Nicholas Marwein	1,945	6.97%	▼2.34
Independent	Jepprin D. Sangma	1,061	3.80%	New
BJP	Livingstone R. Marak	287	1.03%	▼0.38
Margin of victory		5,588	20.04%	▲17.66
Turnout		27,890	79.71%	▲18.82
Registered electors		34,990		▲2.53
HSPDP hold		Swing	▲1.71	

=== Assembly Election 2003 ===
2003 Meghalaya Legislative Assembly election: Nongstoin
Party	Candidate	Votes	%	±%
HSPDP	Hopingstone Lyngdoh	7,495	36.07%	▼7.60
INC	Francis K. Mawlot	7,001	33.69%	▲9.55
NCP	Nondi Diengngan	1,935	9.31%	New
UDP	Everald D. Nongsiang	1,630	7.84%	▼0.60
MDP	Morningstar Tympuin	1,285	6.18%	New
KHNAM	Shanborlang Lyngdoh	1,141	5.49%	New
BJP	D. Didimus Sohphoh	293	1.41%	▼0.17
Margin of victory		494	2.38%	▼17.16
Turnout		20,780	60.90%	▼2.99
Registered electors		34,126		▲9.58
HSPDP hold		Swing	▼7.60	

=== Assembly Election 1998 ===
1998 Meghalaya Legislative Assembly election: Nongstoin
Party	Candidate	Votes	%	±%
HSPDP	Hopingstone Lyngdoh	8,688	43.67%	▼1.45
INC	Jesparwell Dkhar	4,802	24.14%	▲1.57
Independent	Francis K. Mawlot	4,411	22.17%	New
UDP	Everald D. Nongsiang	1,680	8.44%	New
BJP	Hopestandard Myrthong	314	1.58%	▲0.34
Margin of victory		3,886	19.53%	▲3.18
Turnout		19,895	65.67%	▼1.32
Registered electors		31,143		▲5.99
HSPDP hold		Swing	▼1.45	

=== Assembly Election 1993 ===
1993 Meghalaya Legislative Assembly election: Nongstoin
Party	Candidate	Votes	%	±%
HSPDP	Hopingstone Lyngdoh	8,644	45.12%	▼3.40
Independent	Francis K. Mawlot	5,511	28.77%	New
INC	H. N. Diengngan	4,323	22.56%	▼19.86
Independent	Endro Tawphniaw	443	2.31%	New
BJP	Hopestandard Myrthong	237	1.24%	New
Margin of victory		3,133	16.35%	▲10.25
Turnout		19,158	66.97%	▲9.86
Registered electors		29,382		▲25.72
HSPDP hold		Swing	▼3.40	

=== Assembly Election 1988 ===
1988 Meghalaya Legislative Assembly election: Nongstoin
Party	Candidate	Votes	%	±%
HSPDP	Hopingstone Lyngdoh	6,276	48.52%	▲9.37
INC	Francis K. Mawlot	5,487	42.42%	▲29.57
HPU	Mak Thongni	846	6.54%	New
PDC	Hopestandard Myrthong	122	0.94%	▼0.44
Independent	Sholandar Shangoi (Syiem)	121	0.94%	New
CPI	Rostarwell Thabah	47	0.36%	New
Independent	Bidingdro Myrthong	35	0.27%	New
Margin of victory		789	6.10%	▼12.06
Turnout		12,934	56.69%	▼0.54
Registered electors		23,371		▲21.25
HSPDP hold		Swing	▲9.37	

=== Assembly Election 1983 ===
1983 Meghalaya Legislative Assembly election: Nongstoin
Party	Candidate	Votes	%	±%
HSPDP	Hopingstone Lyngdoh	4,218	39.16%	▼21.42
Independent	K. Mawlot	2,262	21.00%	New
APHLC	Mak Thongni	2,134	19.81%	▲9.60
INC	Prelly Marthong	1,384	12.85%	▼12.08
Independent	Artfulson Dkhar	625	5.80%	New
PDC	Wespar Pariong	149	1.38%	New
Margin of victory		1,956	18.16%	▼17.49
Turnout		10,772	59.75%	▼2.33
Registered electors		19,275		▲15.91
HSPDP hold		Swing	▼21.42	

=== Assembly Election 1978 ===
1978 Meghalaya Legislative Assembly election: Nongstoin
Party	Candidate	Votes	%	±%
HSPDP	Endro Lawphniaw	5,864	60.58%	New
INC	Francis K. Mawlot	2,413	24.93%	New
APHLC	Prelly Marthong	988	10.21%	▼7.09
Independent	Nondi Diengngan	415	4.29%	New
Margin of victory		3,451	35.65%	▼29.76
Turnout		9,680	59.76%	▼0.88
Registered electors		16,629		▲123.87
HSPDP gain from Independent		Swing	▼22.13	

=== Assembly Election 1972 ===
1972 Meghalaya Legislative Assembly election: Nongstoin
Party	Candidate	Votes	%	±%
Independent	Francis K. Mawlot	3,630	82.71%	New
APHLC	Ledishon Nongsiang	759	17.29%	New
Margin of victory		2,871	65.41%	
Turnout		4,389	60.73%	
Registered electors		7,428		
Independent win (new seat)				

== See also ==
- List of constituencies of the Meghalaya Legislative Assembly
- West Khasi Hills district
