= Zoram Reformation Front =

Zoram Reformation Front (ZRF) was a former regional political party in Mizoram, India. In 2018, the party merged with Zoram People's Movement.
