= Zoram Decentralisation Front =

Indian political party

Zoram Decentralisation Front (ZDF) was a former regional political party in Mizoram, India. In 2018, the party merged with Zoram People's Movement.
