= United Mizo Freedom Organisation =

- Abbreviation: UMFO
- President: Lalbiakthanga; Lalmawia Khiangte
- General Secretary: Lalmawia Khiangte; L.H Liana
- Treasurer: Lalrinliana
- Founder: Lalbiakthanga
- Founded: July 5, 1947
- Dissolved: 1955
- Split from: Mizo Union
- Merged into: Eastern India Tribal Union
- Ideology: Unification of the Lushai Hills with Burma

United Mizo Freedom Organisation (UMFO), was a political party in the Lushai Hills (today the Indian state of Mizoram). UMFO was founded on 20 July 1947, as a split from the Mizo Union. At the time of Indian independence, UMFO was the second largest political force in the area.

== History ==
The Mizo Union was formed on the onset of Indian Independence to decide the political direction of the Mizo people. However, the party became contested with class divisions of common people against the autocracy of chieftainship. The elites and chiefs formed a right wing of the Mizo Union, which opposed a union with India, opting for independence. The issue became polarized closer towards independence. One of the members of the Mizo Union right wing wanted to join the Mizo areas of Burma and form a separate province in Burma. This led to the formation of the United Mizo Freedom Organisation, which was founded under Lalbiakthanga, an ex-Burmese Mizo military officer from Burma, on 5 July 1947. Lalmawia Khiangte a former King's Commisionered Emergency Officer under the WW2 Britush Government and former Burmese employee held the position of General secretary.

The aims of the party were listed in eight points:

- To be identified as a separate nationality under a strict principle.
- To keep fascism at bay by promoting a true democracy in which people choose their own leader.
- The land and nation should be powerful and self reliant.
- Culture and customs should be preserved in creative ways.
- Cordial relationships and communication should be established between the ruler and the people.
- Effective and efficient model of administration should be adopted.
- There shall be religious liberty

Pachhunga, the first president of the Mizo Union, who formed the right-wing opposing union, defected to the UMFO. His reputation as a wealthy businessman helped the party gain popularity. Lalwamia conducted a goodwill mission to Burma to meet with the Prime Minister U Nu. U Nu, a close associate of Jawaharlal Nehru and who was dependant on Indian aid for the internal insurgencies, stated with little enthusiasm that the inclusion of the Lushai Hills into Burma should only proceed with the endorsement of the wider Mizo population.

Superintendent L.L Peters convened a conference in Aizawl on 14th August 1947 of party leaders and chiefs to clarify the matter of Mizo ascension to another state. The inquiry concluded that the Lushai hills cannot leave the Indian state as it is an excluded area which is part of Assam legally. This barred the Lushai Hills from ascending to either Pakistan or Burma. A 10 year referendum on remaining within the union with India was proposed but this was not responded to in the inquiry. The union with India changed the party policy aim from Union with Burma to protecting the privileges of the chiefs with their support.

The party struggled with popular support. Public opinion supported the abolishment of chieftainship while the UMFO actively supported perpetuation of the institution. Due to this the party became known as Zalen Pawl which refers to the UMFO as the 'party of the privileged'.

In the 1952 Assam Legislative Assembly election (which the Lushai Hills at that time was part of), UMFO put up three candidates, none of whom were elected. In total, the party received 9070 votes (23.76% of the votes in those three constituencies).

The UMFO had little bearing in opposing the union with India and abolishing chieftainship. In 1954, the India Tribal Union was established and articulated the demand for a hill state separate from Assam. The UMFO supported this notion early on, while the Mizo Union did not. The Mizo Union due to corruption and unpopular initiatives on land reform. The UMFO seized this with advances in Aizawl East and Lunglei constituencies. The skepticism of rejection of increased Mizo autonomy under the States Reorganization Act changed the political climate for the UMFO who did take initiative to increase Mizo autonomy. A memorandum was sent to the States Reorganization Commission for the need to establish a hill state for the hill peoples of Assam. The EITU won 10 of the 15 seats contested in the Assam Legislative Assembly.

The UMFO eventually dissolved the party and merged into the Eastern India Tribal Union (EITU) on 2 October 1957. This was in response to the implementation of Assamese as a state language, which motivated a variety of small hill tribe political parties to unite in contention.
