= Eastern India Tribal Union =

Former political party in Northeast India

- Abbreviation: EITU
- Founder: Williamson Sangma
- Founded: 2 October 1954
- Merged into: All Party Hill Leaders Conference
- Ideology: Indigenism

The Eastern India Tribal Union was a political party established in Assam to unite the hill tribes in their grievances against the Assamese government. It was the precursor to the All Party Hill Leaders Conference.

== History ==
The Eastern India Tribal Union was established by Williamson Sangma on 2 October 1954 shortly after the states reorganization commission. The principal reason for the creation of the party was due to the Assam government appointing non tribal people to district councils of the hill districts. The sixth schedule in the Constitution of India permitted governments to nominate members for the district council. This became popular among the hill districts leading to Williamson Sangma to hold a meeting with delegates of the Hill districts. The party was formed in Tura.

The States Reorganisation Commission declined any possibility of forming separate hill states in the northeast. A recommendation of continuing autonomous hill districts under Assam was given in its outcome report. The commission also recorded that the hill districts of Mizoram, Mikir and North Cachar Hills held a view for the status quo. In Mizoram, the United Mizo Freedom Organization opposed this view. After the Assam language circulars were established, the EITU began to oppose the imposition of the Assamese language in their communities. The main ideology of the party was to strengthen the position of the tribals in the northeast and secure a hill state of all the autonomous hill districts of Assam. Reverend B.M. Pugh, president of the EITU and Sangma, vice president, made a visit to Aizawl to discuss their aims and ideology with local leaders and party members. As a result, the EITU established a branch in Mizoram on 30 May 1957. The Mizo right wing and the UMFO merged with the EITU on 2 October 1957.

In 1957, the EITU joined the Chaliha cabinet of Assam. This led to Lalmawia of the UMFO to become parliamentary secretary.

After the mautam famine in Mizoram, the EITU would be supportive of the Assam Government thus alienating the Mizos. In a conference held in Tura in 1960, the Mizoram branch of the EITU split, leaving only the Gharo and Khasi EITU. As a result, the EITU was weakened. Many of its members joined the All Party Hill Leaders Conference founded by Sangma.

== Sources ==
- Nunthara, C (1996). Mizoram: Society and Polity. New Delhi: Indus Publishing Company. ISBN 81-7387-059-4.
- Verghese, C.G.; Thanzawna, R.L. (1997). A History of the Mizos. New Delhi: Vikas Publishing House.
- Zarzosanga (5 January 2024). Political parties in mizoram: A case study of the Mizo National Front. Newcastle Uupon Tyne: Cambridge Scholars Publishing. ISBN 978-1-5275-6259-2.
