= Mizo National Front uprising =

1966 uprising in Mizoram, India

- Part of Insurgency in Northeast India
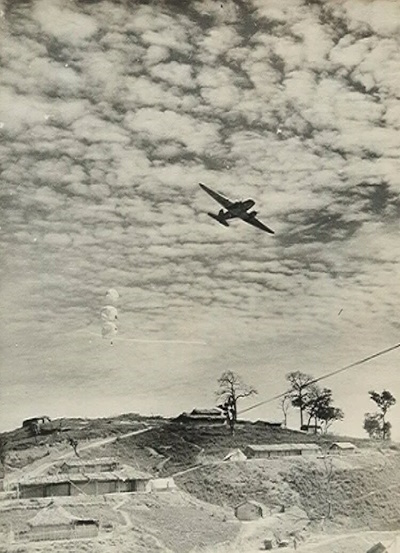
- Planes during the Aizawl bombing
Date	28 February 1966 – 30 June 1986 (20 years, 4 months and 3 days)
Location	Mizo District, Assam, India. (present-day Mizoram)
Result	Indian tactical victory: Mizoram Peace Accord signed; Disarmament of MNF; Creation of New state of Mizoram
Territorial changes	No territorial change: Indian Government recaptures the territories seized by MNF

Belligerents
India; Bangladesh; Burma	Mizo National Front: Mizoram Sawrkar

Commanders and leaders
(India) Lt Gen Sam Manekshaw (India) Maj Gen Sagat Singh	President Laldenga; Vice President Lalnunmawia; Defence Secretary; R. Zamawia; Gen Secy. S.Lianzuala; Foreign secy. Lalhmingthanga; Aizawl Town Zero Hour Operation Leaders; Lalkhawliana; Lalnundawta; Vanlalhruaia

Units involved
1st Battalion, Assam Rifles; 5th Battalion, BSF; 8th Battalion, Sikh Regiment; 2nd Battalion, 11 Gorkha Rifles; 3rd Battalion, Bihar Regiment	Mizo National Army; Mizo National Army Volunteers

Casualties and losses
59 killed 126 wounded 23 missing	95 killed 35 wounded 558 captured

The Mizo National Front uprising (Mizo: Rambuai) was a revolt against the government of India aimed at establishing a sovereign nation state for the Mizo people, which started on 28 February 1966. On 1 March 1966, the Mizo National Front (MNF) made a declaration of independence, after launching coordinated attacks on the Government offices and security forces post in different parts of the Mizo district in Assam. The government retaliated and recaptured all the places seized by the MNF by 25 March 1966.

In the initial response of the government operations to suppress the rebellion in 1966, the Indian Air Force carried out airstrikes in Aizawl; this remains the only instance of the Indian Government carrying out a prolonged airstrike on its own people, in its own civilian territory. Counter-insurgency operations continued over the next two decades, although the intensity of the rebellion diminished over time progressively. In 1986, the government and the MNF signed the Mizoram Peace Accord, thereby ending the rebellion.

== Background ==
Mizo territories of the Lushai hills were incorporated into the British Indian province of Assam following the Chin-Lushai expedition, as the Lushai hills district. Before the formation of the Mizoram state in 1987, the Mizo-dominated areas in independent India were a part of the Mizo district of the Assam state. The Mizo organisations, including the Mizo Union, had long complained of step-motherly treatment of the largely Christian Mizo people at the hands of the Assamese Hindu dominated Assam Government, and demanded a separate state for the Mizos.

Every 48 years, a cyclic ecological phenomenon called Mautam leads to widespread famine in this region. When such a famine started in 1959, the Mizos were left disappointed by the Assam Government's handling of the situation. The introduction of Assamese as the official language of the state in 1960, without any consideration for the Mizo language, led to further discontent and protests.

Before the uprising, there was only 128 km of pucca (metalled) road and 581 km of kutcha (unmetalled) road in the whole district. Till 1971, there was no industrial unit worth the name in the Mizo hills. Education ultimately brought a large section of the young people away from agricultural pursuits. They remained without any employment as there was practically no other economic activity in the area.

In the early sixties, the Assam Regiment Second Battalion, where there was several Mizos was disbanded without making any provision for their rehabilitation. These ex-soldiers nurtured a grudge against the Government of India, and their feelings prompted them to join hands with the MNF. The ex-army men were recruited by the MNF to give guerilla training to the young volunteers.

The growing discontent with the Government ultimately resulted in a secessionist movement led by Mizo National Front (MNF), an organisation that had evolved out of a famine relief team. While the Mizo Union's demand was limited to a separate state for the Mizos within India, the MNF aimed at establishing a sovereign independent nation for the Mizos.

== Formation of Mizoram Sawrkar ==
After the Indo-Pakistani war of 1965 the military presence in the northeast was largely redirected to the western frontier. The MNF began to pressure Laldenga to carry out an attack in light of the opportunity. The executive committee of the MNF party consisting of the party president Laldenga, the party vice president Lalnunmawia, the general secretary Lianzuala, assistant secretary Rosanga and treasurer Rochhinga met in July 1965. A presidential form of government was adopted known as the Mizoram Sawkar. The Mizoram constitution established Upa In (Senate) and Aiawh In (House of Representatives) as the legislative branch of the Mizoram sawrkar. The sawrkar functioned similar to the US style of government with a presidential executive. A national refinement court was established to manage constitutional matters and civil/criminal cases.

Mizoram Sawrkar constitution
	Section	Scope
Article 1	One	Powers of the Legislature and the Parliament
Article One	Section Two-Three	Powers of the Aiawh In (House of Representatives)
Article One	Section Four-Five	Powers of the Upa In (Senate)
Article One	Section Six	Rules of legislation for Parliament
Article Two	Section One-Two	Rights and Duties of Citizens
Article Three-Four	Section One	Impeachment Procedure
Article Five	Section One	Powers and functions of the President
Article Five	Section Two	Powers and functions of the Vice-president
Article Six	Section One	Powers of the National Refinement Court
Article Seven	Section One	Procedure for constitutional amendment

The government formed was as follows:

Executive:

- President:Laldenga, with full executive powers like the USA government.
- Vice President: Lalnunmawia
- Commander-in-chief: Lalnunmawia
- Finance Secretary: C. Lalkhawliana
- Foreign Secretary: Lalhmingthanga
- Defense Secretary: Zamawia
- Home Secretary: Sainghaka
- Chief Justice: John F. Manliana (delayed appointment)
- Secretary of Supplies: Thangkima
- Secretary of Information: Ngurkunga
- Secretary of Welfare: Lalmawia
- Foreign ambassador for Pakistan: Lalthangliana Phillip
- Foreign ambassador for China: J.H. Rothuama
- Foreign ambassador for East Asia and Burma: Dr. Saikunga

Senate:

- Senate President: Vice President Lalnunmawia
- Pro-Tempore President: Rev. Sawkhawliana
- Senator Lalmalsawma Colney
- Senator Bualhrunga
- Senator R. Thangmawia
- Senator Lalhmuaka
- Senator Lalchhawna
- Senator Ngunhulha
- Senator Lallialzuala Sailo
- Senator Dr. Saikunga
- Senator Tlangchhuaka
- Senator Lalkhawhena
- Senator Vanmawia

House of Representatives

- Speaker: Chuailokunga
- Deputy Speaker: V.L. Nghaka
- Representative James Dokhuma
- Representative S.M. Vanhnuaithanga
- Representative Zoramthanga
- Representative Hnuna
- Representative Thangbuaia
- Representative Thangkhuma
- Representative Vala
- Representative Hlunsanga
- Representative Thanghuta
- Representative Thangzika
- Representative Rosanga
- Representative Khawlremthanga
- Representative Chhunzawna
- Representative Lamputa
- Representative Lalchuanga
- Representative Thanghuaia
- Representative Vansiama
- Representative Thattiauva
- Representative Lalchhawna
- Representative Thangzika

Judiciary:

- Chief Justice: John F. Manliana (succeeded by Lalhmuaka after Manliana's surrender)

Early Mizoram Sawrkar flag during the insurgency.

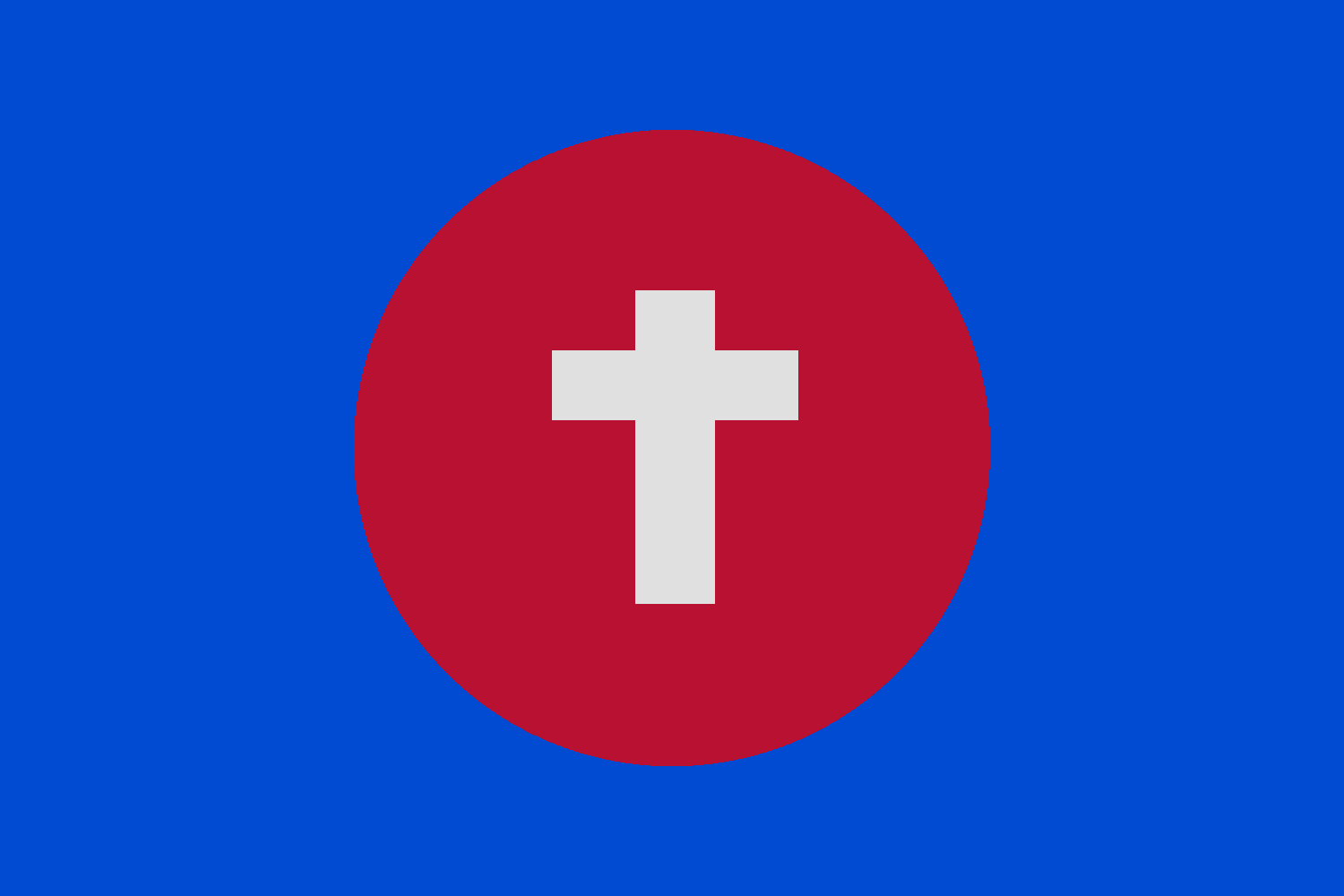
Mizoram Sawrkawr flag under the Mizo National Front (late 70s onwards)

The Mizoram Sawrkawr designed two flags initially. One for the government and one for the Mizo National Volunteers. The Mizo national volunteer force consisted mainly of personnel discharged from the disbandment of the Second Assam Regiment. The flag of the Mizoram sawrkar was originally a red cross on a blue background separated from four white rectangles with white bands. The three colours of the flag were said to represent the Holy Trinity as the Father, Son and Holy Spirit. Along with the constitution, with Christ as the head, Mizoram would be governed with justice, sanctity and love. The blue colour stood for Mizoram and the people. The red colour represented Christ's sacrifice on the cross. The white colour represented the presence and assistance of the Holy Spirit. It was later changed to a small white cross on a red disk on a blue background.

A constitution was also drafted for the Mizoram sawrkar. The first line of the constitution states "The Lord Jesus Christ is the head of Mizoram and the Holy Bible is the foundation of her administration". The government structure was modelled upon the American government. It was a presidential-style political structure consisting of three branches. The branches were the executive, judiciary and legislative. The legislature had two houses; the senate had 12 members and a senate president who was the vice-president of the Mizoram sarkar. The speaker would head the House of Representatives. The executive branch was headed by the President, including the Vice President and 5-6 ministers and secretaries. The Mizo National Army and the Mizo National Volunteers were placed under the authority of the executive branch. The judiciary was a hierarchy with the National Refinement Court headed by a Chief Justice, a Session Court, a District Court, a Subordinate Court and a Village Council Court in that order.

The meeting for the formation of the Mizoram sawrkar also oversaw the planning for Operation Jericho to be commenced on the midnight of 28 February 1966 and for independence to be declared on the following 1 March 1966.

=== Mizo National Volunteers ===
The Mizo National Volunteers were placed within the Mizoram sawrkar. The MNV were divided into three categories: Cammando Squad, Intelligence Squad and Signal Squad. An enrolment form was to be signed with a nominal membership of ₹1. Three conditions were required to become a Mizo National Volunteer as part of an oath sworn on the Bible:

1. Promise to sacrifice one's own life for the freedom for Mizoram.
2. Promise to keep secrecy at all times.
3. Promise for one to do their best for Mizoram.

An MNV would then receive an identification card. The MNV employed both men and women in different roles. Women would undertake training in first aid and nursing along with management of dehusking rice, mending uniforms and food preparation at camps.

Name	Proposed Strength	Actual Strength February 1966	Strength in December 1966
Commands	5	2	2
Divisions	20	6	6
Brigades	60	18	18
Battalions	240	18	32

The MNV was established with two commands. The Western Command was delegated eight brigades, and the Eastern Command was delegated ten bridges. The original intention was to establish 3 divisions consisting of three brigades per command. However, the shortage led to a total allocation of 18 brigades and a total of 2000 MNV participants in the uprising. Laldenga personally arranged 50 of the best-performing volunteers into a new "special force" designated as bodyguards for his presidential role. Major Lalliana was the commander of the special force. The MNV established a separate flag from the Mizoram Sawrkar, the flag consisted of a black background with the head of a tiger in the centre.

== MNF's plan for armed uprising ==
The extremist section within MNF advocated the use of violence to seek independence from India. A special armed wing called the Mizo National Army (MNA) was created for the purpose. The MNA consisted of eight infantry "battalions" organised on the pattern of the Indian army. One of the battalions was named after Joshua, while the rest were named after the legendary Mizo heroes: Chawngbawla, Khuangchera, Lalvunga, Saizahawla, Taitesena, Vana Pa and Zampuimanga. The Lion Brigade (Chawngbawla, Khuangchera, Saizahawla and Taitesena battalions) operated in the northern half of the district, while the Dagger Brigade (Joshua, Lalvunga, Vanapa and Zampui Manga) operated in its southern half. MNA consisted of around 2000 men, supported by another group called the Mizo National Volunteers (MNV), which comprised an equal number of irregulars.

As early as September 1963, Laldenga met spoke with the Pakistani Assistant High Commissioner at Shillong. The MNF leaders Lanunmawia and Sainghaka accompanied Laldenga and visited East Pakistan (now Bangladesh). They travelled through the East Pakistan Rifles Camp at Mahmuam reaching Dacca on 6 December 1963. This was where the Government of Pakistan offered them supply of military hardware and training and gave the go ahead for further activities. Laldenga and his lieutenant Pu Lalnunmawia were arrested by the Government of Assam on the charge of conspiring against the nation, but were released in February 1964 after an undertaking of good conduct by Laldenga. However, shortly after their release, MNF intensified its secessionist activities. The MNF members forcibly collected donations from the Mizo people, recruited volunteers and trained them with arms supplied by Pakistan. By the end of 1965, the MNF weapon cache consisted of the plastic explosives stolen from the Border Roads Organisation, rifles and ammunition obtained from the 1st Battalion, Assam Rifles (1 AR) headquartered at Aizawl, crude bombs and Sten guns.

The men trained in Pakistan were delayed from the arrest. As a result, the first training batch of 22 men occurred in December 1964 and finished to return to Mizoram in February 1966. A transfer of arms from the Pakistani government was also. The arms were hidden in jungles on their way home and retrieved by 200 volunteers. A second arms transfer was made at Ruma Bazar in July 1965 with 300 volunteers sent to receive the arms from East Pakistani troops. After the uprising, another arms transfer would take place at Ruma Bazar on 20 August 1968 under ss Col. Halleluia of the Mizo National Army.

The Indian armed forces, fresh from the Sino-Indian War of 1962 and the Indo-Pakistani War of 1965, were focused on the Indo-Pakistan and Indo-China borders. The extremist MNF leaders wanted to take advantage of this situation by starting an armed rebellion to establish an independent Mizo nation. The rehabilitation of the pro-government Chakma refugees from East Pakistan in the Mizo district further instigated them.

The Assam Government kept a close watch over the developments. The Mizo National Volunteer was undergoing training at various places and used bamboo or firewood as rifles for training. The first training with real arms began on 15 August 1965 and lasted two days with for 250 officers at Tuichhun. The MNF President took a salute with a ceremonial parade on 23 August 1965 and unfurled the MNF flag. Chaliha revealed to the assembly that Laldenga had spoken to him on his secessionist ideas and had personally asked for his help in the matter. Chaliha further admitted that Laldenga and Lalnunmawia were released on parole based on a written agreement to fully cooperate with the Government for the development of the Mizo district which Laldenga personally delivered. Chaliha argued that crushing the MNF before their declaration of independence would have vilified the government of Assam for initiating violence. Armed reinforcements were sent to Mizoram such as the 18th Assam Rifles Battalion on 10 February 1966. Laldenga attempted to communicate with Chaliha on 21 February 1966 but was rejected by Chaliha. Laldenga sent a telegraph requesting the withdrawal of additional forces which Chaliha never acknowledged.

Accordingly, a plan (codenamed "Operation Jericho") was created to systematically capture the power in the Mizo district. The name Jerichol was utilised after the biblical story of the Israelites' demolition of Jericho under Joshua. The MNF aimed at taking over the treasuries and the petrol pumps, neutralising the police force and capturing all the important non-Mizo ("Vai") officials. The MNF flag was to be hoisted at Aizawl on 1 March 1966, followed by a victory parade on 2 March 1966. The MNF arsenal would be supplemented by capturing the armouries of 1 AR, the Border Security Force (BSF) and the local police. The MNF leaders had hoped that they would have a large number of sympathisers among the local police, the government officials and the AR, which would make the takeover peaceful. They also hoped that if they could keep their flag flying in Aizawl for 48 hours, other countries such as Pakistan would recognise the Mizo territory as a sovereign nation and take up their case in the United Nations. The volunteers and the sympathisers of MNF were promised a prosperous future in the proposed sovereign state.

The plan was kept in strict secrecy. As a cover, the MNF leaders indulged in public propaganda advocating use of "non-violent means" to achieve independence for Mizos. The MNF commander Lt. Col. Laimana, who was suspected of being a government informant, was assassinated on 1 January 1966.

On 27 February 1966, Pu Laldenga and some other MNF leaders decided that the armed insurrection would start on 1 March. The instructions were sent to launch simultaneous attacks on the posts of the 1st AR and the BSF. In case the attack failed, an alternate plan of concentrating near the Indo-Pak border was also made.

The government authorities did get some indications of the upcoming armed action, but failed to anticipate its intensity. On the night of 27 February, Rokima, the brother of the MNF lieutenant Pu Lalnunmawia was killed in an apparently accidental hand grenade blast, which was noticed by the AR personnel. All AR posts were alerted to keep a watch on the movements of MNF members.

The MNF maintained intelligence through various methods. Use of threats, blackmail, bribes and false patriotism led to Mizo bureaucrats and civil officers to communicates intelligence about the security forces. The MNF also arranged intelligence officers at every village to maintain up to date news on developments for the movement as well as restricting villagers from informing security forces.

== Armed action by MNF ==
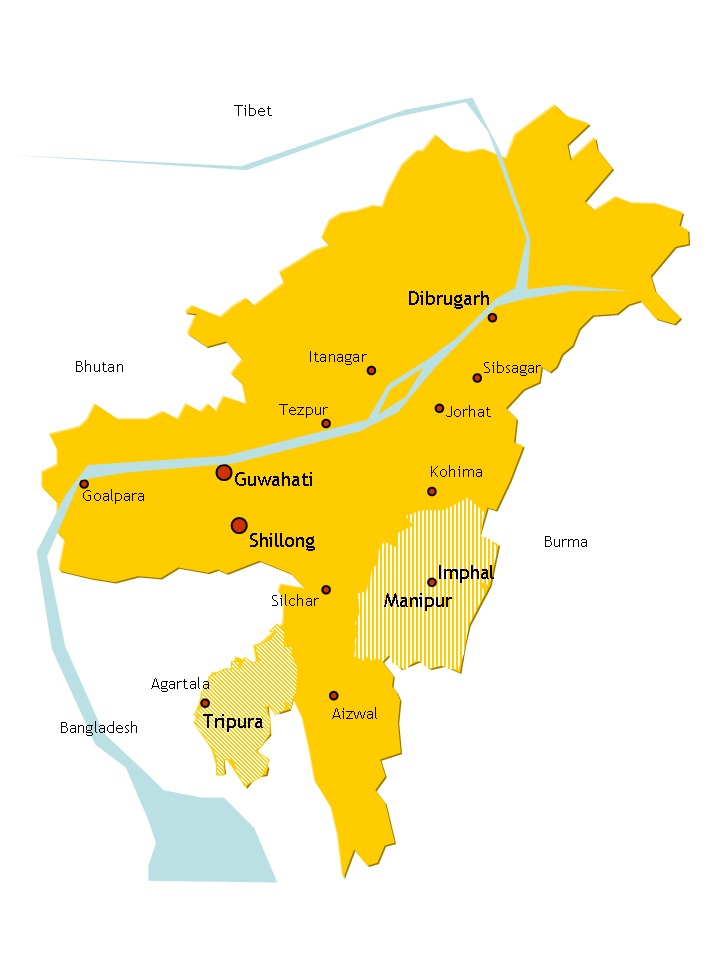
Mizoram was a part of the Assam state in the 1950s

The security forces stationed in the Mizo Hills district included the 1st Battalion, Assam Rifles (1 AR) headquartered at Aizawl, the 5th Battalion, Border Security Force (5 BSF) and the local police. On the night of 28 February/1 March 1966, the MNF launched a series of simultaneous attacks on the 1 AR garrisons at Aizawl, Lunglei and Champhai and the 5 BSF posts at Chawngte, Demagiri, Hnahlan, Marpara, Tipaimukh, Tuipang, Tuipuibari, Vaphai and Vaseitlang.

=== Lunglei ===
The first attack by MNF began at about 10:30 pm IST on 28 February 1966, at the sub-treasury at Lunglei. A group 500–1000 strong attacked the camp of the security forces and the AR post. The attack was repulsed, leaving two AR personnel and a few MNF militants dead, and three more AR personnel wounded. The AR camp was surrounded and starved by the MNF militants for three days. The IAF Helicopter at last flew over the camp to supply the prior needs of Assam Rifles. On 5 March, the insurgents kidnapped R.V. Pillai, the Sub-divisional Officer. By 7 March, they had captured the AR post as well as the Border Roads Task Force camp at Lunglei.

=== Aizawl ===
The MNF insurgents entered Aizawl on the night of 28 February 1966. The same day, the Mizo district administration came across the copies of the two-page declaration of independence distributed among the MNF leaders. Since the insurgents had cut all the telephone lines, the local authorities could not seek immediate help from Shillong or Silchar. Later, the commanding officer of the Border Roads Organisation managed to send a wireless message to Silchar.

At 02:00 IST, on 1 March 1966, the insurgents attacked the telephone exchange at Aizawl. An hour later, around 150 insurgents led by Pu Lalnundawta, attacked the Aizawl District Treasury and looted money, arms and .303 ammunition. Within a few hours, the insurgents took control of all the important centres of the Mizo district, paralysing the civil administration. They also seized all the vehicles in the town. The law and order situation went beyond the control of the local Police and the small units of AR posted in the district. T S Gill, the Deputy Commissioner of the Mizo district, took shelter in the AR headquarters. The insurgents attacked the 1 AR headquarters in Aizawl unsuccessfully. They also attacked the AR post at Chhimluang on the Aizawl-Silchar road, but were repulsed by the Riflemen. To stop any reinforcements from Silchar, they created several roadblocks and damaged the only bridge on the road.

Around this time, several MNF leaders had gathered in Aizawl on the pretext of a General Assembly. A few of the MNF leaders strongly opposed the violence, and asked Laldenga to withdraw his orders for an armed action. However, it was too late to discontinue the operation, as the rebels had already attacked multiple places including Lunglei, Champhai and Demagiri.

On 1 March, Laldenga made a declaration of independence, and exhorted all the Mizos to join the revolt against the "illegal Indian occupation" of the Mizo territory.

On 2 March, the insurgents ambushed a patrol of 1 AR, and inflicted heavy casualties on them. After 1 AR at Aizawl refused to surrender, the MNF suicide squad launched an attack on them at 9:00 on 4 March. They lost 13 men in a counter-attack by the Assam Rifles soldiers. Two helicopters with reserves, ammunition and water sent by the Government to help the Riflemen could not land due to constant firing by the insurgents. Some of the air drops meant for the riflemen fell into the hands of MNF members.

The same day, the insurgents released all the prisoners from the Aizawl jail, who looted the shops of the non-Mizos ("Vai"s), and also burned several huts in the Aizawl bazaar. Due to the AR's refusal to surrender, the victory parade proposed to be held on 2 March was postponed to 10 March.

On 5 March, the insurgents led by Pu Hruaia plundered the Public Works Department office in Aizawl, looting items for the "Mizoram Sawrkar" ("Mizoram Government") Office. On 11 March, the insurgents burned the houses of the senior officials of the Mizo Union.

=== Other places ===
At about 01:30 IST on 1 March 1966, around 150 insurgents armed with lathis surrounded the sub-divisional officer of the Public Works Department at Vairengte and asked him to get out of the district. They also took over the departmental stores and the jeep. Similar incidents were reported from Coinluang and Chawngte. On the same day, the insurgents easily captured the AR post at Champhai, with help from their sympathisers in the security forces.

At Kolasib, the insurgents took around 250 civil officials, the policemen, the intelligence personnel and the road builders as captives, and kept them without food and water. The women and children were also taken as captives and kept separately in a small building. None of the civilian officials and government servants were hurt, as MNF expected their support in running the administration of the proposed sovereign state.

== Government response ==
According to a statement made by the Chief Minister of Assam Bimala Prasad Chaliha, on 1 March, the insurgents who attacked the Aizawl treasury and Lunglei numbered around 10,000. The Indian Home Minister Gulzari Lal Nanda, in the Indian parliament on 3 March, stated the total number of rebels in Aizawl, Lunglei, Vairengte, Chawngte and Chhimluang as 800–1300.

On 2 March 1966, the Government of Assam invoked the Assam Disturbed Areas Act, 1955 and the Armed Forces (Special Powers) Act, 1958, proclaiming the entire Mizo district as "disturbed". Bimala Prasad Chaliha condemned Laldenga for his "betrayal", while Gulzari Lal Nanda promised "stern action" with "all the force" at the Government's command. A 24-hour curfew was imposed in Aizawl on 3 March, and reinforcements were sent for 1 AR by helicopters.

=== Airstrikes ===
The IAF was asked to carry the troops in Mi-4 helicopters into the besieged AR camp, accompanied with fighter escorts, but failed due to heavy and accurate fire by the insurgents. The Toofani fighters of 29 Squadron operating from Kumbhirgram and Hunter fighters of 17 Squadron operating from Jorhat undertook independent missions to escort the troop reinforcements and to suppress the insurgents. Later, when the GOC Eastern Command, Lt. Gen. Sam Manekshaw, flew over parts of Mizoram in 1968, his helicopter was fired at by the insurgents. Attempts were made on 4 March 1966 to fly into the 1st AssamRifles at Aizawl. However, the MNF heavily fired at the six helicopters assigned, which caused a retreat. General Sam Mackenshaw and Air Vice Marshal YV Malse flew in on a Caribour aircraft for reconnaissance over Aizawl. It returned to Kumbigram with bullet holes and nearly wounding General Mackenshaw. After these two confrontations, the Air Headquarters flew in troops into the 1st Assam Rifles Camp with Fighter escorts. Seven helicopters and four French built Dassault Ourangan Fighters named Toofani were used. Toofanis on each side of the helicopters fired rockets at MNF hostiles as the helicopter approached a makeshift helipad on the 1st Assam Rifles Camp. The Toofanis were further used over other places without having to escort any further helicopters. This was argued to help ease the pressure off besieged forces until reinforcements arrived.

On the afternoon of 4 March 1966, the IAF jet fighters strafed the MNF targets in Aizawl using machine guns, allegedly causing few civilian casualties. Four aircraft identified as Toofanis and Hunters were seen flying over Aizawl at 10 am on 5 March 1966. After the preliminary surveillance the first shots were fired at Tuikhuahtlang, an area housing a water reservoir the MNF had occupied. Laldenga's house located nearby and the Boy's Middle English School were also targeted. The school was believed to be a location for the feeding of MNF volunteers. The aircraft opened fire over the rest of town and destroyed the Circuit House and burning the Armed Police Headquarters and locations in Khatla where C. Pahlira's house was also burned. Chhinga Veng and Dawrpui and the main market area was also burned down. A crevice was created by impact of aerial fire at Mission Vengthlang. R. Zamawia the defence Minister for the Mizoram Sawrkar recorded the experience in his book Zofate. Zamawia claimed that the attack on helicopters the previous day injured Sam Mackenshaw in the leg as an emerging rumour. The MNF believe the bombing occurred due to this. Zamawia witnessed four jet fighters flying in pairs and firing at Tuikhuahtlang. The fighters were firing 20mm, 30mm, 40mm and incendiary bombs. The MNF moved out of Aizawl and Kulikawm and made their way to Hlimen instead. According to some other accounts and counterarguments, the houses were destroyed in the fires started by the prisoners released from the Aizawl jail by the insurgents. The jet fighters further operated outside of Aizawl on villages. These were justified as keeping the MNF at bay. At Hnahlan near Champhai two Mizo soldiers from the Assam Rifles Camp warned the villagers of aerial attacks on the morning of 7 March 1966. At 2pm on the same day, two jet fighters flew over the village strafing and bombing the houses. Of the 270 houses more than 200 houses were destroyed with three people killed. The domestic food stock and livestock were burned down. Sangau was also attacked by jet fighters the same day. At Khawzawl, the first jet fighter sifted on 6 March fired at the army camp and burned all the houses except the quarter guard. The following day on 7 March the fighters flew to Khawzawl again and burned down the entire village. The MNF who had besieged the Assam Rifles Camp was undeterred from the attacks. The siege continued to 8 March when a strategic retreat was made. At Tlabung on the Bangladesh border the fighter attacks continued for three days from 9 March with two jets in pairs firing machine guns and dropping bombs. Pukpui and Bunghmun villages were attacked by jet fighters. Pukpui was the native home of Laldenga. There were no MNF posts in Pukpui but the village was fired by the planes on 13 March after the army herded the villagers into an open area. The army advancing into Bunghmun were attacked by the MNF leading to the killing of a Major. Ten minutes after the skirmish, two jet fighters flew over the village on three rounds, one for surveillance, another for machine gun firing and a third for bombing. The village of Bunghmun was up in flames with remaining houses burned proactively by Indian military personnel. A mentally challenged woman was reportedly burnt alive in her home and up to 22 Indian soldiers were killed via the jet fighters attacks.

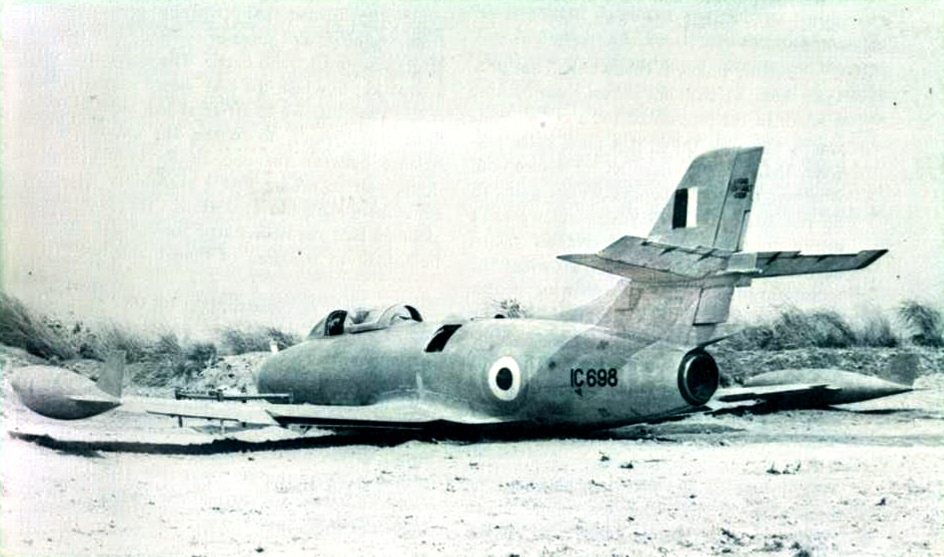
An Indian Air Force Ouragan Fighter Bomber (Toofani) model from 1965 Pakistan border.

In September 1966, two jet fighters were spotted flying over South Mualthuam. The fighters flew to Tuipui and released a volley of machine gun fire. A year later the air force would be used once again on 31 January 1967 at Hmuntlang to aid the Indian army. A villager recorded in a diary that the livestock was killed and large holes where bombs were dropped were observed.

In the history of independent India, this remains the only instance of the Government of India resorting to air strikes in its own territory. Senior Journalist Shakhar Gupta in an article identified that Rajesh Pilot and Suresh Kalmadi were among the IAF pilots who dropped the bombs. Pu Zoramthanga, who went on to become the Chief Minister of Mizoram in 1998, once said that the main reason he joined the MNF and became a rebel was the "relentless bombing of Aizawl in 1966". The people of Mizoram now observe Zoram Ni ("Zoram Day") to commemorate the air raids.

=== Ground operations ===
The operations were overseen by HQ Eastern Command under Lt. Gen. Sam Manekshaw. The local responsibility for the army operations was given to 101 Communication Zone under Maj. Gen. Sagat Singh. 311 (Independent) Infantry Brigade was located at that point of time in Silchar. An additional formation, 61 Mountain Brigade (under Brig. R.Z. Kabraji) was moved from Agartala to Aizawl. Subsequently, a regular division, HQ 57 Mountain Division was raised at Masimpur, near Silchar which oversaw counter-insurgency operations in Mizoram in the later stages. The leading battalion of 61 Mountain Brigade, the 8th battalion, Sikh Regiment (8 Sikh) advanced from Silchar into the disturbed area on 3 March. The forces could reach Aizawl only on 6 March, due to the roadblocks caused by the militants. On 7 March, they relieved the besieged AR garrison at Aizawl. On 8 March, the 2nd battalion, 11 Gorkha Rifles (2/11 GR) moved towards Champhai and the 3rd battalion, Bihar Regiment (3 Bihar) towards Lunglei. By 15 March, all of 61 Brigade with its four battalions and supporting arms and services had moved into Mizoram and by the end of the month had regained control of Mizoram.

=== Withdrawal of MNF forces ===
The insurgents had managed to capture all the posts of 1 AR except their headquarters at Aizawl. Their chances of capturing the AR headquarters were low after the IAF airstrikes. When the MNF leaders heard about the likely arrival of the Indian Army in Aizawl on 7 March, they decided to retreat to Lunglei, which was under the MNF control.

The security forces threatened to bomb Lunglei, but two Christian clergymen – H. S. Luaia and Pastor C.L. Hminga – requested them to avoid it in order to prevent loss of civilian lives. The two also persuaded the MNF not to attack the army. After some resistance, the MNF rebels withdrew from Lunglei on 13 March, taking away some arms, ammunition and vehicles with them. The security forces secured Lunglei on 14 March, and Champhai on 15 March. The 5th battalion, Parachute Regiment (5 Para), was flown in by helicopters to Lunglei on 14–15 March, set out for Demagiri and secured it on 17 March. By the 25th, all the important towns and the posts had been freed from the MNF control.

By the end of March 1966, the Indian security forces had captured 467 muzzle loading guns, 332 shotguns, 175 rifles, 57 pistols/revolvers and about 70,000 rounds of ammunition from MNF. However, MNF had also managed to obtain a large amount of ammunition from the captured security forces posts. Its weapon cache consisted of: around 1500 shotguns, 600 rifles (mostly .303 bore), 75 sten-guns, 30 revolvers/pistols, 25 carbines and 20 light machine guns.

The MNA headquarters, originally located in Aizawl was moved multiple times during the conflict: first to South Hlimen (on 3 March), then to Reiek (on 18 March) and finally to the Chittagong Hill Tracts in East Pakistan.

== Insurgency ==
The Mizo Union leaders blamed the MNF for the loss of civilian life, and condemned the armed insurrection. The MNF accused the Indian Government of "indiscriminate bombing on civilian population" during the airstrikes in Aizawl. Two MLAs of the Assam state, Stanley DD Nichols Roy and Hoover H Hynniewta, visited the Mizo district to take a stock of the situation. Later in April, Roy moved a motion in the Assam Legislative Assembly on the Aizawl air attack, calling the use of air force "excessive".

By the end of 1966, reinforcements were sent to the district by the Government in form of:

- two Indian Army battalions
  - 18th battalion, Punjab Regiment (18 Punjab)
  - 9th battalion, Bihar Regiment (9 Bihar)
- three Assam Rifles battalions (6th, 18th and 19th)
- four armed police battalions of the Central Reserve Police Force (CRPF)

The MNF insurgents dispersed in smaller units, merged with the local population and continued to carry out armed attacks against the security forces in the district. The villagers suffered from both sides as the insurgents would kill those resisting their entry into the villages while the villages suffered reprisals from the security forces in case ambushes had taken place in their vicinity. On 5 August 1966, the Indian government condemned the Pakistani Government. The Tashkent Declaration of peaceful relations on 10 January 1966 agreed for non-interference in both countries' domestic politics. The condemnation covered Pakistan's aid to the Mizo National Front and opening of bases in the Chittagong Hill Tracts.

The Mizo National Front was outlawed in 1967. The same year, the Counterinsurgency and Jungle Warfare School was set up at Vairengte to train the soldiers in fighting with the rebels in the North-East India.

=== Mizo National Army ===
On 1 January 1967, Lalnunmawia reorganized the Mizo National Volunteers into the Mizo National Army. A discipline code was inducted into the Mizo National Army with penalties ranging from fines to death for disobeying any of the 22 rules. The shortage of food, lack of military aid from Pakistan, and ineffeincy of MNVs led to a reorganisation of the Mizo units and the Mizo National Army. The staff hierarchy cut down Major Generals into Colonels overnight. The MNF became more efficient via the reorganization and was considered superior to the Naga militant structure due to higher quality of staff and officers. The MNA inflated their claims of their strength to secure the confidence of Pakistan and China to support their struggle.

=== Guerilla activities ===
After the end of the original uprising, the MNF resorted to guerilla warfare. The MNF would ambush patrols of security personnel completing search and destroy missions. Other activities included kidnapping of individuals not cooperating with the MNF, terrorising non Mizos to support and provide for the MNF. This included the Tongchangya, Chakma, Reang and Mara who were made to take refuge and surrender their villages or provide hospitality. The MNF would also loot and destroy by forcefully taking vital resources from individuals. The MNF furthermore burned down Tongchangya and Chakma villages and forced them to evacuate out of the Mizo District. War taxes were introduced on people to extort funding for the insurgency. Road blocks were placed to control traffic. The MNF would also sabotage public buildings, including bridges, powerhouses, control towers and water supply. Foreigners and Indians in the district would also have warning letters and propaganda leaflets demanding evacuation.

== Operation Security ==
Operation Security was a policy launched by the Indian government in 1967 to regroup villages. The Indian Army referred to it as "Operation Accomplishment".

As the insurgents found security and refuge in the large number of tiny hamlets from which they would launch attacks on the patrols of the security forces and later merge into the civilian population, the military need was felt to deny the militants access to the common people. To solve the problem, the Government of India resorted to a "grouping" policy in the Mizo district, starting in January 1967. The plan was initially proposed by Lt. Gen Sam Manekshaw and the Government of Assam to an initial rejection from the central government before intense lobbying by the army granted the scheme to be executed. The grouping policy was subsequently named Operation Security.

This grouping has also been said to be the beginning of social evils in Mizoram. The villagers were forced to move to these camps, and agreement papers were often signed at gunpoint. Multiple phases of displacement and regrouping were planned. Under the Defense of India Rules, the specified date and time for all immovable buildings to be burned or rendered useless was before 1 November 1967. At times, villagers were left homeless because the villages had been destroyed before the grouping centres were ready. Such was the case for Lungdai village, which was burnt in 1967, and the villagers waited a whole year within the jungles and fields.

The first stage of grouping was called Protective and Progressive Villages (PPVs). These were built in 10 weeks along the Silchar-Kolasib-Aizawl-Lungleh national highway. A total of 106 villages were grouped together into 18 grouping centres of a total of 52,210 people. In February 1967, the centres were placed under civilian administration while security matters and daily maintenance was placed in the responsibility of Indian security forces. The civilian administration was led by a member of the Assam civil service delegated as an administrative officer or area administrative officer.

The PPV grouping was carried out under the Defence of India Rules 1962 provisions. The PPVs created were: Vairengte, Lungdai, Thingdawl, Kawnpui, Bilkhawthlir, Sihpir, Durtlang, Zemabawk, Tlungvel, Thingsulthliah, Pangzawl, Baktawng, Chhingchhip, Chhiahtlang, Serchhip, Bungtlang, Hnahthial and Zobawk. Kolasib was an administrative centre that provided security protection during this phase. I.A.S. or A.C.S officers would manage and look after two or more PPVs under an Areas Administrative Officer. Each PPV would be assigned an Administrative Officer of A.C.S rank or equivalent such as BDO. Administrative officers would also have a sub-administrative officer of the rank of extension officer of Agriculture or something similar.

The second phase of grouping was called the New Grouping Centre. It was established in August 1969 under the Assam Maintenance of Public Order Act 1953 (AMPOA). It managed five population sectors, mainly the Tripura border, Lungleh-Lawngtlei road, Darngawn-Bungzung North, Vanlaiphai-Serchhip Road and Seling-Champhai Road. It involved 184 villages grouped together into 40 grouping centres with a total population of 97,339.

The third phase, Voluntary Grouping Centres, was established in August 1970 under the AMPOA. It was responsible for several villages in different parts of the Mizo Hills and consisted of 26 grouping centres for a total population of 47,156. This was carried out by the 59 Mountain brigade in Manipur.

The fourth and final phase was called Extended Loop Areas ordered in 1970 under AMPOA. It planned for 63 villages with a population of 34,219 into 17 grouping centres.

Village Regroupings
Serial No	Name	Population
Protected and Progressive Village (PPV)
1.	Vairengte	1,988
2.	Bilkhawthlir	2,709
3.	Thingdawl	2705
4.	Kawnpui	3,650
5.	Lungdai	2,048
6.	Sihpir	2,635
7.	Durtlang	2,825
8.	Zemabawk	1,958
9.	Thingsulthliah	3,662
10.	Tlungvel	2,757
11.	Baktawng	3,049
12.	Chhingchhip	3,933
13.	Chhiahtlang	3,269
14.	Serchhip	3,615
15.	Bungtlang	2,499
16.	Pangzawl	2,580
17.	Hnahthial	3,921
18.	Zobawk	2,699
Total PPV Population:		52,519
New Grouping Centres (NGC)
1.	Lokicherra	5,910
2.	Rengdil	4,493
3.	Kawrtethawveng	2,254
4.	Tuipuibari	4,061
5.	Phuldungsei	834
6.	Marpara	1,507
7.	Darngawn (W)	627
8.	Kawnpui (W)	1,515
9.	Puankhai	1,367
10.	Demagiri	5,560
11.	Kalaichari	599
12.	Borapansuri	1,079
13.	Jarulchari	1,090
14.	Vaseitlang	3,572
15.	Parva	1,941
16.	Lungsei (N)	2,579
17.	Jauruang	1,114
18.	Lawngtlai	2,514
19.	Thingfal	1,598
20.	Tawipui	2,481
21.	Ruallang	1,876
22.	Saitual	2,301
23.	Kawlkulh	2,183
24.	Khawzawl	approx. 5,000
25.	Chawngtlai	2,169
26.	Champhai	2,822
27.	Bungzung	3,190
28.	Vanzau	2,671
29.	Vaphai	2,357
30.	Farkawn	2,548
31.	Khawbung	3,067
32.	Lungdar	3,830
33.	North Vanlaiphai	1,915
34.	Khawlailung	1,534
35.	Cherhlun	approx. 2,800
36.	South Vanlaiphai	3,084
37.	Neihdawn	2,078
38.	Zote	2,184
39.	Ruantlang	2,790
Total NGC Population:		97339
Voluntary Grouping Centres (VGC)
1.	Lallen	718
2.	Lengpui	1,126
3.	Hmunpui	774
4.	Bukpui	1,247
5.	Sairang	2,207
6.	Hlimen	1,647
7.	Khawrihnim	964
8.	Reiek	1,488
9.	Rawpuichhip	827
10.	Hortoki	1,995
11.	Bairabi	1,757
12.	Phaileng	1,231
13.	Lungpho	2,726
14.	Khawhai	3,726
15.	Sialhawk	2,289
16.	Chhipphir	1,795
17.	Mualthuam	1,377
18.	Haulawng	2,127
19.	Thingsai	2,201
20.	Thenzawl	3,441
21.	Darlung	1,412
22.	Kanghmun	945
23.	Buarpui	1,461
24.	Sialsuk	2,281
25.	Bunghmun	2,461
26.	Chawngte	3,113
Total VGC Population:		47,156
Extended Loop Areas (ELA)
1.	Darlawn	3,102
2.	Ngopa	1,952
3.	Suangpuilawn	2,322
4.	Kepran	2,136
5.	Ratu	1,498
6.	Hnahlan	2,270
7.	Changzawl	2,815
8.	Khawdungsei	1,425
9.	Vevek	2,098
10.	Zohmun	2,325
11.	Vanbawng	1,603
12.	Khawruhlian	3,058
13.	Phullen	2,051
14.	Mimbung	1,557
15.	Khawlian	1,843
16.	Phuaibuang	1,687
17.	Kawlbem	477
Total ELA Population:		34,219
Other centres
1.	Mamit	2,573
2.	Tuipang	1,365
3.	Sangau	approx. 1,000
Total Misc Population:		4,938
Total Population:		236,162

Aizawl, Lunglei and Chhimipuitui with the surrounding villages were left ungrouped. With a total population of 34,431 ungrouped people.

The third and fourth phases of regrouping were challenged in Chhuanvawra versus the State of Assam and others. The orders of Operation Accomplishment were challenged on the basis of violation of the Fundamental Rights guaranteed in the Constitution, which led to a suspension of the grouping operation. Upon scrutiny by the Gauhati High Court to justify the continuation of the policy, the Government of Assam assured no further implementation of the operation; however, at that time, the third and fourth phases were essentially nearly complete. Another opponent of the grouping was Dengthuama, a member of the district council and president of the Mizo Congress. He filed a writ petition. Despite the grouping of villages under the operation, the intensity of the insurgency continued until 1970 with significant military skirmishes continuing up to 1976. The implementation of the policy also harmed agricultural output and caused near-famine conditions, prompting villagers to return to their previous settlements to cultivate crops, further showing the failure of the policy.

While insurgency continued at lower levels, the space for political negotiations was created and led to Mizoram becoming a Union Territory and the entry of the MNF into mainstream politics.

== Unrest period ==
=== Violent skirmishes ===
By May 1966 23 violent encounters had been recorded. As early as March 1966, seven security forces were killed in a skirmish with 7 jeeps burned and 15 wounded in Tuimuk. Operation Gideon was commenced on 5 May 1966 where 11 vehicles were burned and 16 rifles were seized. Shortly after on 16 May, 50 army personnel were attacked by the MNF leading to two MNF men dying. From September 1966 the MNF resumed armed attacks in Cachar. 100 MNF volunteers attacked a police station at Jairampunji in Cachar bordering the Mizo district with rifles and grenades. Three constables were killed as a result. Lalnunmawia who was acting president in Laldenga's absence issued order from Dhaka. The order stated that from 1 June 1967 sabotage and sniping should be intensified in the towns of Aizawl and Lunglei. Sabotage parties of the MNF fought destroyed powerhouses and waterworks. The MNF town commissioner of Aizawl ordered schools and colleges to be closed in Aizawl or else grenades would be thrown inside the classrooms. During October and November 1967 the special squads set fire to a few PPV buildings of the grouping centres. These centres were Tlungvel south and the Lungdai Grouping Centre.

=== Operation Sialkal Mipuite Thlamuanna ===
Operation Sialkal Mipuite Thlamuanna was an ambushed planned by the MNF on the commander of the 9th Bihar Regiment C.O. Major Hawa Singh Deswal. Many villagers had complained of Deswal who had been named Suala (lit. 'Bad man'). Major Deswal became disreputable and feared by Mizo women due to his demands that they be sent to him at the Army Camp situated at Ngopa. An MNF volunteer Sawma in his diary recounts how he inquired of an upset women and learning of Deswal. She had been repeatedly ordered to go to Deswal's camp and was too scared to refuse. The Lalvunga battalion stationed in Aiduzawl planned an attack. A meeting of officers was held by the Lalvunga battalion on 19 April 1968 by Lieutenant Colonel Kapthuama. Operation Sialkal Mipuite Thlamuanna would target Deswal. The following week the MNF received information that Deswal would lead a platoon towards Kawlbem. The platoon was ambushed on their return journey. 75 men were assigned to the operation and opened fire upon the party at the old village site of Tualbung near the Ngopa camp. Deswal was killed alongside 20 soldiers and 7 wounded. The MNF lost 2 men in the attack. The surviving soldiers of Deswal's platoon reported the incident to the Ngopa camp. One of the soldiers had claimed to play dead while the MNF looted their pockets. The MNF captured 28 arms and a wireless transmitter headset.

In response to the ambush and death of Desawl, the army at Ngopa sent men to Tualbung. The corpses of the platoon were retrieved and cremated. The report, which described the MNF men as being tall with long hair, led to discrimination of such individuals in the grouped villages.

==== Amnesty ====
In August 1968, the Government of India offered amnesty to the insurgents, which resulted in the surrender of 1524 MNF members. This was followed by more amnesty offers during 1969–70. and expatriated in April.

B.P. Chaliha announced the first general amnesty on 19 December 1966. A second more liberal amnesty was announced on 31 January 1967 up to 31 March 1967. Efforts were made by dropping amnesty leaflets from helicopters. In response, the MNF on 6 February 1967 announced an amnesty to Indian personnel who would surrender. In the first amnesty call, J.F. Manliana former member of the Assam Legislative Assembly and first Vice President of the Mizo National Front party surrendered on 31 December 1966 at Momcherra with three bodyguards. In August 1967 Senator S. Lallianzuala have himself up in what some maintain was a staged arrest. In the samemonth 539 unarmed MNF surrendered and by 1968 over 1929 had surrendered.

On 20 August 1971 to 15 December 1971 another amnesty was announced in the hopes that the revolt of East Pakistan would inspire MNF to surrender. The terms included a person for participation in rebellion towards India and a grant of ₹100. Further rewards were announced to those who surrendered with their arms. The rates were as follows:

- LMG: ₹4,000
- Mortar/Rocket Launcher: ₹600
- 7.62 Calibre self loading rifle: ₹500
- .3.3 rifle/ Sten gun/ carbine: ₹300
- Pistol/Revolver: ₹250

As a result, only 60 people accepted the amnesty. The government had expected more to surrender. However Laldenga had spoken on the 5th anniversary of the Independence declaration on 1 March 1971 which prevented most from leaving. Mass surrendering only began after the creation of Bangladesh, without their weapons. Surrenders of the MNF was accepted indiscriminately and terms of amnesty extended to them. The biggest was 750 surrenders led by Lalnunmawia and 335 led by R. Zamawia at Lunglei. The inauguration of UT Mizoram also released detained MNF personnel such as Sainghaka and Vanlalhruaia among 75 others under the terms of amnesty. Other prisoner released such as S. Hminghtanga and Lalthansanga were used as envoys to the MNF in Bangladesh to encourage peace talks. However some argue that the New Executive Council in Laldenga's absence had ruled in February 1972 to send back the weak and old to Mizoram while amnesty was in effect.

After the assassination attempt on S.P. Mukherjee in 1974 and the killing of the top three police officials in 1975, new administrative changes took place. An IPS officer who served in Janmu and Kashmir Surendra Nath was brought in as Chief Secretary while Brigadier Ranghawa a retired army officer was inducted Inspector General of Police. These two appointments results in 266 insurgents and large arms reports being seized.

==== Chronology of Significant surrenders ====
- 1975
  - 3 January: Major B. Khualchhawna, Aizawl Town Commander and 5 others.
  - 2 June: Khawpuithanga, General Secretary of the MNF
  - 30 June: Major Demkhosiak, two other majors and 51 others with arms and ammunitions from China.
  - 10 September: Captain Rualkhuma with 6 officers and 58 others.
  - 19 November: Captain Thangkima with 3 other Captains, 6 lieutenants, 45 officers and 15 privates.
- 1977
  - 9 June: Brigadier General John Sawmvela, Chief Justice with 62 others.
- 1979
  - 1 August: Brigadier General Biakchhunga, Defence Minister Lalhleia and General Secretary Lalthawmvunga, 25 officials and 100 others.
  - 14 August: Second batch of Brig. Gen Biakchhunga's group, Major Vanlalnghka, Captain Lalsangliana, 2 officers and 99 others.
  - 28 August: Malsawma Colney with 6 others.

=== National Emergency Council ===
On 23 December 1971, the MNF met in a Chakma village and established the National Emergency Council (NEC) with Lianzuala as the chairman. The Liberation of Dhaka compelled the MNF to extraordinarily change the structure of the government as the Parliament and civil administration were unable to run anymore. As a result, all presidential and parliamentary powers were vested in the NEC except foreign affairs which Laldenga vested with himself. After the formation of the NEC, Laldenga would leave to West Pakistan. However, on departure to Akyab, Laldenga took upwards of ₹350,000 for himself and 10 top executives of the MNF. As a result, only ₹70,000 remained for the Mizoram Sawrkar to run the administration. As a result, the MNF became outraged and lost confidence in Laldenga.

=== Peace negotiations ===
==== MNF factional rivalry ====
As peace communications via the Christian Peace Committee was encouraged a rival faction emerged. Young intellectuals of the MNF who felt no future for the MNF except integration with India began to support peace negotiations with India while the orthodox view of the MNF desired complete independence. The MNF finance minister C. Lalkhawliana stated to the church leaders his willingness to cooperate with India on a peace outcome. His discussion was reported to Laldenga on 1 May 1969. However, Lalkhawliana and his colleagues were soon beginning to be labelled Dumpawl (navy blue). The Dumpawl were described as cowards and betrayers of the Mizo fight for independence. Lalnunmawia himself had begun to support the view of attaining statehood for Mizoram as a better solution to complete independence. In February 1971, Laldenga was re-elected as President of the Mizoram sawrkar but left the exiled capital in the jungle preferring to reside in Dacca. Before his departure, Laldenga held a tea party where officers of the civil and armed wings were invited. Laldenga supposedly attempted reconcile the two factions to unite the organization. However, accusations and counter-accusations plagued the meeting. Bawichhuaka was accused to collecting loyal officers to stage a coup against Laldenga. After the meeting Laldenga ordered all leaders of the Dumpawl to be arrested. Under the guise of moving the sawrkar headquarters to Rangamati with army headquarters to Lungudu in the wake of the Mukti Bahini insurgency, the MNF began to arrest Dumpawl leaders on 13 May 1971. On 28 May 1971, Laldenga issued orders suspending officers in the MNA ranked higher than Lieutenant Colonel. The prisoner carried out a hunger strike as they were not explained the reasoning for the detainment and wished for a fair trial. However the request was rejected. Some prisoners escaped and surrendered to the Indian government instead. Among the prisoners who escaped and surrendered were Finance Minister C. Lalkhawliana, supply Minister H. Thangkima, Foreign Affairs Minister Lalhmingthanga and Ambassador to China Lalthangliana Phillips. The list of the most prominent MNF individuals accused of being part of the dumpawl was as follows:

- Vice president Lalnunmawia
- Finance minister C. Lalkhawliana
- Foreign minister Lalhmingthanga
- Supply minister H. Thangkima
- Vice president S. Lianzuala
- Defence minister R. Zamawia
- Chief justice Lalhmuaka
- Cabinet secretary Vanmawia
- Three brigadier generals

==== Developments in Bangladesh ====
Later, the Mizo Union's negotiations with the Union Government resulted in the Mizo district gaining the status of a Union Territory as "Mizoram" on 21 January 1972. After the Bangladesh Independence War, the administrative unit of East Pakistan was dissolved. The dissolution of this strategic region and partnership crippled the insurgency's ability to evade government forces and be resupplied with weapons and resources to continue their fight. As early as December 1971, the National Emergency Committee was formed while Laldenga worked in Pakistan for foreign affairs. As early as December 1972 upon the Independence of Bangladesh, the NEC under Malsawma Colney met with leader of the Union Territory of Mizoram to begin initiating talks with India. In 1975 the Assassination of Sheikh Mujibur Rahman and the subsequent junta government prompted laldenga and the MNF to re-establish bases in Bangladesh to evade Indian counter-insurgency. The MNF also founded the Tripura National Volunteers which they trained. Indira Gandhi raised concerns over the rise of the golden triangle drug trade and the possibility of the MNF using it as a funding source.

The MNF volunteers moved to the Arakan Hills in Myanmar. Laldenga was visited in 1972 by a Pakistani Consul from Rangoon which arranged for him tobe flown to Karachi and then UK. The MNF were permitted to remain in the Arakan Hills under the Communist Party of Burma in exchange for aiding their fight against the Burmese Army. A delegation was sent to China in 1974 to request aid for the insurgency. Permission to send a contingent troop to China for training and arms was received in July 1975. A total of 108 men were trained at the Menghai Army Training Centre for four months before returning to Mizoram and distributing a portion of their arms to the Kachin Independent Army for free passage.

==== 1976 Accord ====
Following a series of meetings with RAW agents, Laldenga visited Delhi with his family in 1976 to begin the first official rounds of talk with the Government of India. On 6 February 1976, an accord was signed where the MNF accepted that Mizoram is an integral part of India and acknowledged to accept the settlement of the problem within the framework of the Indian constitution. Other terms included the hand over of arms and ammunition and an end to violent activity. However, internal struggle in the party over Laldenga's direction divided the party apparatus to have cohesion in foreign policy conduct for a few years, hence delaying the opportunity for peace. In particular, Laldenga's general in Burma, Biakchunga, was opposed to a peace settlement with India. Furthermore, the agreement was kept secret until June. After the Lieutenant-Governor of Mizoram ceased counter-insurgency operations, Laldenga repudiated the agreement and retracted his obligations. Laldenga eventually purged opponents of peaceful cooperation in his party through demotion and expulsions, which united the party direction for the settlement with India. After Laldenga's self-imposed exile to London, Laldenga had lost control of the party apparatus. Laldenga began to especially harbour caution to Biakchunga who had gained increased control over the Mizo National Army. Biakchunga possessed a hawkish perspective on the direction of the movement and lacked political foresight regarding Laldenga. Chatterjee argues that Laldenga repudiated the agreement on the basis that going against Biakchunga would have led to a disintegration of the movement.

==== President's rule ====
Chief Minister Chhunga's cabinet resigned on 9 May 1978. Mizoram was placed under President's rule. The imposition of the President's rule in Mizoram led MNF rebels to establish themselves in Burma to evade arrest. The success of counter-insurgency led to many captures of MNF participants. Laldenga chose to resign as president of the Mizo National Front and government in the face of mounting unpopularity in June 1978. Biakchunga was subsequently elected to replace Laldenga. However, due to his lack of political experience, Biakchunga was made to resign shortly after. Biakchunga was charged with violation of the constitution of the Mizo National Front. Kawlvela, an ally of Laldenga had demanded Biakchunga's resignation. Biakchunga believed in continuing the underground movement. His ideals consisted of militancy, gun-running and Maoist dogmas and an uncompromising attitude to complete independence and secession from India. Laldenga wanted to use the prospect of secession to collect political concessions and maximise autonomy for the Mizos in the framework of the Indian constitution. On 27 October 1978, Laldenga was expelled from the MNF in a meeting in Burma. Thangchuaka was elected president of the MNF and the underground government.

President's rule was set to expire and the electoral commission established election for 1978. Sailo's People's Party, won 23 out of 30 seats. Sailo had campaigned on economic development, protection of religious and cultural identity of the Mizos. Laldenga had requested the Mizos to boycott the election but the request was not heeded. Laldenga subsequently declared the election illegal and derecognised the Sailo government of Mizoram. The MNF and Laldenga saw Sailo as a supporter of Indian imperialism in Mizoram. The MNF cooperated with the opposition party the Mizo Congress to bring down Sailo. Sailo cooperated with the church and encouraged MNF rebels to return to normal life and to contribute in nation building Mizoram. He offered economic assistance to further encourage repentance for participation in the insurgency. Figures such as General Biakchunga took up the offer and returned to normal life from the underground movement.

Sailo's policy of anti-corruption also led to unpopularity from careerists in the government. On 13 October 1978, 8 out of 23 seats of his party withdrew support for Sailo. Thangridema, the speaker of assembly joined the opposition wing of the People's Party. The opposition parties such as Mizo Congress, Janata Party and Independents formed a new party known as the United Legislature Party. Sailo was accused of rigging the election and was demanded to be ousted and have his cabinet resign. The Lieutenant-Governor discussed the matter with the President Neelam Sanjiva Reddy of imposing President's rule which was granted. A second President's rule was established on 11 November 1978. The assembly was dissolved. Despite doubts on resumption of election, the electoral commission declared 24 April 1979 as the next assembly election.

==== T. Sailo's Government ====
With the Janata Party coming to power, Morarji Desai committed to peace talks and cooperated closely with Brig T. Sailo. The MNF's violence and the Mizo congress's opportunism had caused disillusionment in the Mizo population, who began to support Brig T. Sailo and the People's Party. T. Sailo supported the counter-insurgency against the Mizo National Front. Despite establishing a human rights commission of the army's atrocities, T. Sailo blamed the civilians for the lack of cooperation for the excesses committed. T. Sailo blamed the insurgency for stalling economic development and did not represent the people's best interests. Sailo's own son joined the underground MNF and justified the violence and virtues espoused.

The elections after the second president's rule period, saw Sailo's party come back to power. His previous detractors saw a decrease in overall results for forming the rival faction that dissolved the government prior.

Morarji Desai was pressured to cooperate with Laldenga over his preferred candidate of Sailo from media reports on Laldenga's escalations. Laldenga had increased attacks on non-mizo civilians such as the chakma and foreigners. Ministers in Morarji's cabinet such as George Fernandes even requested Morarji to hold a meeting with laldenga. Desai's meeting with Laldenga requested acceptance of Indian citizenship and a written pledge to end violent activities. Laldenga demanded Morarji to dismiss Sailo's cabinet and government and for him to be instated as chief of Mizoram under the claim he was the sole legitimate representative of the Mizo people. Desai rebuffed Laldenga, similar to a meeting with Zapu Phizo that he had no interest in discussing an Indian problem with someone who didn't consider themselves Indian. Due to this, the talks drifted, and the negotiations failed within a few minutes. Laldenga held a second meeting with Desai. He repeated his demand to be placed chief minister of Mizoram. Laldenga placed the argument as the only method to peace in Mizoram. However, due to the failure of Laldenga's political promises such as the 1976 accord, Desai simply told Laldenga "I do not trust you." and ordered him to leave. Afterwards, Laldenga attempted to convince Prime Minister Charan Singh but failed.

The Home minister later in the Rajya Sabha stated that Laldenga should follow the signed accord of 1976 under Indira Gandhi. it was further stated that effective measures of surrendering arms must be implemented before he can be assigned chief minister, or else no more talks will be made with Laldenga, citing lack of fulfilment. During this time, T. Sailo began to cooperate with Laldenga. Sailo offered to step down on the condition that peace returns to Mizoram. Laldenga, distrusting of Sailo, refused to entertain the proposition. The central government becoming hesitant to settle peace outside of a constitutional framework convened an all-party conference in Aizawl, where the results favoured cooperation between the MNF and the Indian government.

==== Quit Mizoram notices ====
On 3 June 1979, the Mizo National Front issued a Quiz Mizoram notice. Previous notices had been issued in March 1966 and December 1974, but this was the first notice where the chief minister of Mizoram challenged it. Brigadier T. Sailo issued a strong warning to the Mizo National Front in an All India Radio Aizawl speech the following day. The MNF spread these notices to many educational institutions. Teachers that refused to abide by their orders were instead killed.

Chatterjee argues that the rise of All Assam Students' Union due to the Assam agitation of Bangladeshi immigrants, also encouraged the MNF to follow suit. This action was supported by the Mizo Zirlai Pawl and extended their cooperation. Another offered perspective corresponds to the Anti-Mizo riots in Silchar. On 3 June 1979, R.K Chaudary, the subdivisional officer of Champhai public works department was killed by MNF extortionists. The return of his body to his hometown of Silchar led to a wave of communal violence and destruction of Mizo property on 7 June 1979. The MNF retaliated and the Assam government sealed the border between Mizoram and Cachar as a result.

The Quit Mizoram movement saw an increase of violence in MNF participants. On 2 July 1979, the MNF attacked the All India Radio broadcast in Aizawl and damaged the transmitter. Assassination attempts were repeatedly made on inspector general of police Ved Mehra and his deputy R.S Chopra. A covert Assam rifles lorry carrying families of Assam rifles soldiers were being transported in civil dress before the MNF ambushed them with automatic weapons on 27 February 1980. A total of 6 died and 11 were injured. Another infamous case of the Quit Mizoram campaign was the execution of a naturalized teacher in rural Mizoram known as Dutta. Drunken MNF participants demanded his wife for him and executed him in forceful entry with an Ak 47 rifle and hung a Quit Mizoram notice in the room of the murder. Several murders occurred sporadically soon after with the killing of female labourers. The escalation of violence harmed the reputation and public support of the MNF and even led to Zoramthanga condemning the abuses and executions.

==== Laldenga's imprisonment ====
Laldenga was interned in his residence at Gulmohar Park. He was charged with the procurement of a fake passport under the identity of 'Samuel Sen'. The charges were also spread to Laldenga's son David. Due to this he was transferred to Tihar Jail in August 1978. With the decline of the Janata government, the political parties of India condemned the decision to imprison laldenga. The Congress party argued heavily with prominent supporters such as Indira Gandhi and George Fernandes finding it conunter-productive to peace talks. Desai was blamed for the arrest despite it being under Charan Singh's prime ministership.The political actors of the time described the imprisonment as a breach of faith for Laldenga coming to Delhi for peace talks. Swaraj Kaushal, an advocator of the Supreme Court, secured a writ for the release of Laldenga. In apology the government compensated Laldenga with a flight West Germany and other expenses associated. Foreign press outlets in Pakistan, China and Tory politicians both questioned the decisions of the Indian government.

Laldenga was arrested briefly in July 1979 and bailed out. The cases against him were revoked by Indira Gandhi on the intervention and appeal of the Mizo Congress Party on 30 June 1980. Laldenga would subsequently on 3 July 1980 make an announcement that the MNF would agree to peace within the framework of the constitution of India. Previous tactics of violence and terrorism was condemned by Laldenga as counter-productive to their cause. He also commented on the Quit Mizoram movement as a movement disrupting unity in Mizoram. He justified that the Quit Mizoram idea was an outdated discredited relic of Naga rebels that conflicts with the social fabric of Mizo society. He offered guarantees of cessation of violence and punishment for spoilers who continue hostilities. Laldenga signed an agreement with Indira Gandhi for a ceasefire.

==== Continued peace negotiations ====
Peace talks began once more in 1980 and Indira Gandhi sent Yashpal Kapur to promise statehood to Mizoram on Christmas in return for surrender of all arms. Laldenga negotiated a 'free zone' for the arms dumps and chose Chhimpuitui. However, Laldenga also demanded the dissolution of the Union Territory (UT) of Mizoram with an interim government headed under the Mizo National Front, which declined by both the central government and Brig T. Sailo's UT government. The Home ministry did not agree to the free zone citing complications and Sailo refused to give up his position as Chief Minister. Laldenga finally sent Delhi a peace charter with 36 demands. The biggest demand was statehood for Mizoram with protections similar to Kashmir and the incorporation of territory from neighbouring states for a Greater Mizoram. The territorial demands would affect Tripura, Assam and Manipur. Indira Gandhi obliged initially to discuss the terms before the mass immigration of Bangladeshi refugees took away her attention from the Mizo peace negotiations. Laldenga threatened to repudiate the agreement unless peace talks resumed by November 1981. Despite the ban on the MNF being lifted, Laldenga continued to increase recruitment, propaganda and train guerilla rebels. With a breakdown in peace negotiations, the MNF was declared illegal in January 1982. Gandhi would subsequently comment that the demands were difficult but she had continued to hope for an end to the violence and to continue negotiations. It was not until 1984, the Mizoram Congress Party would come to power and reopen the channels for peace talks.

Pressure continued to mount on Sailo to resign by student associations, opposition parties and other supporters of peace. However, Sailo refused to step down. The failure of the peace talks in 1980 led to the Indian government sending Laldenga and his wife to London on 21 April 1982.

==== Renewed conflict ====
Concerns were raised by Chief Minister T. Sailo over the violent incidents by the MNF in breach of the 1976 agreement. Sailo continued to go against the central government and refused to cooperate with Laldenga as he perceived the MNF movement to be decaying and Laldenga's influence waning. Sailo and Laldenga began a feud that soured the chance for peace. Laldenga accused Sailo of recruiting ex-MNF rebels to kill rebels. Sailo brought countercharges accusing Laldenga of causing instability and permitting hostile actions. Public resentment led to student marches and shutting down of educational institutions. However many organizations actively supported an end to the violence. The Students Joint Action Committee (SJAC) organised support for the peace talks by performing a general strike for two days from 3–4 June 1986 and requesting the stepping down of Lal Thanhawla to secure a peaceful transition of power. The Mizoram Church Leaders Committee (MCLC) was a coalition of church denominations consisting of Presbyterians, Baptists, Salvation Army, Roman Catholics, Pentecostals, Seventh Day Adventists, Assembly of God, Lairam Baptist and Isua Krista Kohran supporting non-violence and return to peace. The MCLC actively participated in organising peace channels, convening an all-party meeting and submitting a memorandum for peace talks in good faith. Chief Minister Lal Thanhawla expressed cooperation for peace talks upon his inauguration, but this became severely delayed following the assassination of Indira Gandhi. Laldenga would return from London on 31 October 1984 on the day of her death. Rajiv Gandhi continued with negotiations with encouragement from Church leaders in 1985.

==== Mizo Accord Negotiations ====
The election of Lalthanhawla saw a popular government in Mizoram who saw economic growth and cooperation with the MNF rebels for a peace opening. The success of the Assam Accord under Rajiv Gandhi also created confidence for a Mizo Accord to be signed. Negotiations continued and public press coverage irritated Laldenga who accused the media of sabotaging the peace process. Laldenga worked with Rajiv's representatives and only met with Rajive for 15 minutes to outline a discussion on 23 December 1985. Lalthanhawla continued his promise but outlined the need for him to step down rather than be removed as this would reflect badly on the Mizo Congress party. Laldenga views Lalthanhawl's hesitation as a sabotage for this reason.

The Mizo National Front under Laldenga and the Indian National Congress with the political affairs cabinet and Arjun Singh under Rajiv Gandhi present, signed a political settlement on 25 May 1986, which was finalised as the Mizo Accord on 30 June 1986. The agreement outlined the incumbent Chief Minister Lal Thanhawla to vacate his position in favour of Laldenga, and to perform duties as a Deputy Chief Minister under a coalition government. The Mizo National Front laid down their arms, suspended ties with groups such as the Tripura National Volunteers and People's Liberation Army of Manipur. The MNF also conceded their desire and goal for a greater Mizoram encompassing Souther Manipur and Chin State. The first election for the State Legislative Assembly took place in February 1987, leading to an MNF victory and the inauguration of Mizoram as a fully-fledged state.

=== Human Rights Abuses under the AFSPA ===
The Armed Forces Special Powers Act was extended to cover Mizoram as a disturbed area in 1966. The act encompasses wide-ranging powers to security forces in counter-insurgency operations. Powers granted include allowing commissioned military personnel to use lethal force if it is felt necessary for the maintenance of public order, empowerment to destroy property suspected of insurgency operations, arresting without warrants with any amount of force necessary to enforce, and immunity to military personnel from legal proceedings against acts under the AFSA unless permitted by the central government.

Security officers, after the events of the MNF uprising, engaged in detainment of men, looting of property, mass rapes of women, unjustified killings and torture in settlements such as Kolasib and Kawnpui. After the MNF ambushed a patrol the security forces gathered the men and herded them into a hall and hospital building. The soldiers lost discipline and began to loot the houses and assault the women freely. Three men were shot on sight, namely Dawia, Lianthuama and Thomas Pahlira on the street. Another individual, Tanzova, and his brother were tortured to death in captivity. Another ambush on the outskirts of Kawnpui on 5 March after Kolasib would lead to a similar tragedy. In addition, ₹2,000 would be taken from the Church treasury. This led to many people fleeing Aizawl to remain in the jungles out of fear of being 'liberated' by the Indian security forces. Closely after Kolasib, detainment and starvation of communities over the course of several days took place in Kelkang by being confided in their Church with no food and water. Local politicians such as village council members were shot dead. Officers of the Army would also abuse their power and demand women from village councils or engage in rape, which would-be underreported due to cultural stigma and shame. An incident in Champhai recounts Indian security forces grouping the men and women separately into schools and churches. Men would be tortured for links to the Mizo National Front while women were sexually assaulted, sometimes in public view. Some officials would hold the women back for weeks with them as an extension. After Major Pritam Singh of Ruallung Post was killed by the Chawngbula battalion, his diary was uncovered which listed the names and dates of the women he had slept with or assaulted. The issue of army abuses made many women cover their faces with coal to not attract attention from security personnel. Rape victims admitted to the civilian hospital saw doctors attempt to make a complaint to army authorities and the district commissioner. A three officer team of the army authorities investigated the complaint and left stating that no serious injuries had occurred. One incident recounts how Hrangdailova, an office clerk, took up a rape case against Captain Mhan Singh. He wrote up a complaint to the authorities on 29 December 1969 and acted as interpreter for an inquiry headed by a lieutenant colonel. For this reason, on a New Year's celebration, Captain Mhan Singh attempted to shoot Hrandailova but was overpowered due to being intoxicated. Another complaint was launched, which saw Mhan Singh court-martialled and relieved of his duties. However the rape case launched against him was never resolved.

On 2 July 1967, Captain Kathak the commander of the Army Camp at Ngopa was ambushed and wounded by the Lalvunga battalion near Aiduzawl. The MNF warned the villagers and village council president of the reprisal of the security forces but it was not heeded. The Indian army fired upon the village with 2" mortars and guns. Soldiers came and gathered the village into the Presbyterian Church. Two individuals were shot dead because they were evacuating too slowly according to the personnel. Another individual, named Kambawiha, had requested a movement permit that day and was shot dead on simple suspicion. His corpse and the bodies of the other victims weren't given a proper burial as the able bodied men were locked away. To prevent further abuse two individuals voluntarily stepped out and admitted themselves as informants. Their houses were burnt and they were sent to prison at Aizawl, Guwahati, Golpara and Dubri. In terms of torture, the security personnel utilised many methods. A prominent method was to put prisoners into sacks and force them to smell burning hot chillies while suffocating them. A mass punishment would see whole villages kneeling for long periods and beaten. At Tuisen a suspected MNF member was tied to a tree and burned alive. Soldiers would also hang individuals upside down while interrogating them. In 1967 Khawbung village saw the President and Village Council members hung upside down and beaten. Major Nathan demanded that unless a woman was given to him he would burn down the village. As a result, a water-fetcher was sacrifice to appease the forces and save the village.

The grouping policies of Operation Accomplishment oversaw the settlement of Protected and Progressive Villages (PPV), which unfolded many human rights violations and abuses. Evacuation from old village settlements often required signing consents at gunpoint. Freedom of movement was curtailed with military oversight and registries, and the distribution of rations was implemented. Forced labour was utilised in these camps, and resistance was punished physically. Crimes rates were high both within the Mizo communities confined in PPVs and offences from military personnel. The construction of the grouping centres required large amounts of local labour which was carried out through coolies and forced labour. Due to traditional Mizo customs of women fetching water for the army camps this led to abuse and rape. In some camps the rapes became so egregious that men had to be supplemented for the fetching of water instead. Coolies and forced labour oversaw men required to carry equipment and military supplies for several days and forego domestic duties and agriculture. The army also believed that the MNF would not attack patrols with Mizo coolies. In January 1967, coolies from Kelkang and Buang were taken alongside 14 MNF prisoners to Champhai. The MNF skirmishes with the patrol before retreating. As a result, Captain Grewal Singh took his revenge on the prisoner and coolies instead, leading to the deaths of 18 men. The coolies were made to kneel as they were shot at point-blank range. As he was reloading, the remaining survivors escaped into the jungles.

The arrival of Brig T. Sailo curtailed the atrocities committed by the security forces. T. Sailo established a Human Rights Committee in 1974 and submitted 36 cases to Indira Gandhi for accountability of the Army's conduct. T. Sailo highlighted how the burning of villages, burning of churches and mass rapes as a counter-insurgency policy prompted a need for such intervention. As a result, T. Sailo developed his party the Mizoram People's Conference. However, he has been criticised for sidelining the violations against women during the counter-insurgency upon coming to power. T. Sailo's intervention created caution with security forces actions and his military background afforded officers to maintain discipline.

In 2010, there was a strong public outcry regarding the human rights violations of the Indian Army and security personnel and demands for an official apology from the Indian Government. The apology was demanded to also cover the bombing of Aizawl in the wake of the Mizo National Front uprising. Current investigations and interviews of victims of sexual assault have been difficult due to the current stigma and personal concerns of being named and losing their honour. Physical assault of male labourers was also common for failing to do tasks such as supplying water or firewood, and the punishment would extend to their families. Under AFSPA, the ability to detain individuals with little to no reason also led to common physical deformities when released.

=== Controversies of the MNF ===
Initially the MNF maintained a code of conduct to not harm Mizos or antagonize them away from the cause. The security forces used this against them by forcing Mizo civilians to orbit the security personnel. This made ambushing and skirmishes more difficult for the MNF. As a result, most ambushes occurred on motorized roads rather than village roads. The MNF would also listen to the complaints of the Mizo civilians and take the initiative to help. However, in the later years, the MNF began to change from these tactics. After the creation of the Union Territory of Mizoram, the MNF began to terrorize the Mizo civilians as well. Towards the end of the insurgency this became the standardized code of conduct for the MNF. The earliest example of harm done to another Mizo was the assassination of Laimana on 4 January 1966. Laimana was a recruit who had trained in East Pakistan as one of the earliest members. Laimana was shot dead during a new years celebration by his own comrades. This was supposedly due to suspicion of informing authorities on hidden arms depots for the MNF. After the village groupings in Mizoram, the MNF began to extort the Mizo civilians, such as the ones reputed or suspected of being informers, government employees or non-Mizo. It is estimated the MNF killed 350 Mizos during the 20 year insurgency. Church leaders condemned the MNF for their violence. During a peace negotiation via the Church as mediators the 13 Black list was mentioned. The 13 Black List was a list issued by the MNF Police Commissioner who were identified for punishment for failure to comply with the order that all Mizos should resign from the government. Laldenga would claim no knowledge of such actions during the meeting and that no further action would be taken. On 16 June 1967 the Mizo National Army would enter Aizawl to kidnap 12 individuals and 5 government officials. The security forces engaged with the MNA leading to death of Superintendent of Industries Lalrinmawia. On 4 January 1980 the MNF would shoot Thangthula the administrative officer of Zote due to a refusal to financially aid the MNF.

The first non-Mizo captured by the MNF would be R.V. Pillai on the night of the Mizo uprising. However he would be kept in good condition and released on request of the Presbyterian Church leaders. After the inauguration of UT Mizoram in 1972, a section of hardcore MNF rebels in East Pakistan began to travel back into Mizoram during the Bangladesh War of Independence which distracted the Indian military. Under Captain Lalhleia the hardcore MNF faction took revenge on former MNF vice-president Lalnunmawia. They accused Lalnunmawia of deserting Laldenga and heading a rival faction Dumpawl (Dark Blue) advocating moderatism. Lalnunmawia in Laldenga's absence began to lean towards a peace settlement with India despite being warned against it. While in hospital for treatment, Lalnunmawia was killed on 25 June 1973 unbeknownst to Laldenga, Lalnunmawia's wife or his bodyguard.

On 10 March 1974 the MNF made an attempt on the Lieutenant Governor of Mizoram, S.P. Mukherjee. While Mukherjee returned to his cavalcade shots were fired and Mukherjee was shot in the knee. Officials pulled Mukherjee away where he survived the ambush. The MNF claimed that they did not engage heavy fire on account of R.L Thanzawna, a Mizo officer who had shielded Mukherjee. In 1975 the MNF would kill three top police officials. Disguised as policement, on 13 January 1975, the MNF fired shots at Deputy IGP L.B. Sewa, Superintendent of Police K. Panchapagesan and IGP G.S Arya. This led to a national outroar and a massive manhunt in the hills which curtailed activities.

== Legacy ==
=== Emergence of Rambuai Literature ===
The events of the Mizo uprising and insurgency led to the creation of a literary genre unique to Mizoram known as Rambuai. Rambuai translated means 'troubled land'. The writings explore several perspectives from the artocoties of the Indian army, the underground movement and the violence and trauma of the period.

=== Impact of Operation Accomplishment ===
The regrouping period of the Mizo insurgency led to several changes in Mizo society and culture. The Mizo cuisine began to change and utilise more Indian crops and ingredients such as mustard oil, onions and potatoes into their dishes. Shops also increased and the changes in logistics allowed for better stocks and businesses. The ID issued to families also introduced large-scale photography. The Mizos changed the way their houses were constructed. Modern designs were introduced, and even multi-storey buildings.

The traditional system of Mizo courtship nula rim was impacted. Normally, when men would court women at night or in the afternoon by visiting their houses, the new security provisions and curfew did not allow that. Love songs composed in this era were known as curfew songs. The total number of churches decreased, but overall membership increased. Priests were now responsible for fewer churches overall and formed closer bonds with people.

== Remembrances ==
- 20 February, the "State Day" is an annual public holiday in Mizoram.
- 1 March, the day of the declaration of independence, is commemorated by MNF as "Mizo National Day."
- 5 March, the day of major bombarding in 1966, is known as "Zoram Ni" (the day of Zoram).
- 30 June, the day of signing the Mizo peace accord in 1986, is officially observed by the government of Mizoram as "Remna Ni" (the day of peace).
- 20 September is observed by MNF as the "Martyr's Day" to memorialise the deaths of MNF soldiers during the insurgency period.

== See also ==
- Insurgency in Northeast India

== Sources ==
- Chawngsailova (2012). Mizoram during 20 dark years. Guwahati: EBH Publishers (India). pp. 36, 37. ISBN 978-93-80261-74-4.
- Goswami, B.B (1979). The Mizo Unrest: A Study of Politicisation of Culture (PDF). Jaipur: Aalekh Publishers.
- Nunthara, C (1996). Mizoram: Society and Polity. New Delhi: Indus Publishing Company. p. 42. ISBN 81-7387-059-4.
- Sundar, Nandini (2011). "Interning Insurgent Populations: the buried histories of Indian Democracy". Economic and Political Weekly. 46 (6): 47–57. JSTOR 27918119.
- Verghese, C.G.; Thanzawna, R.L. (1997). A History of the Mizos. New Delhi: Vikas Publishing House.
