= When Blackbirds Fly =

Historical Mizo novel

- Book cover of When Blackbirds Fly
- Author: Hannah Lalhlanpuii
- Language: English
- Series: Not Our War
- Genre: Historical fiction, middle-grade novel
- Publisher: Penguin India
- Publication date: February 7, 2022
- Publication place: India
- Media type: Print
- ISBN: 978-0143453376

When Blackbirds Fly is a historical novel by Hannah Lalhlanpuii of Mizoram, India. First published on 7 February 2022, the book is part of Penguin India's the Not Our War series and is among the middle-grade historical novels set in Northeastern India, focusing on the Mizo community during the 1966 bombing of Aizawl.

== Plot ==
The narrative centers around an unnamed adolescent boy living in Aizawl with his father and grandfather. His life is characterized by simple joys and close friendships with Rini, described as an extremely talkative girl, and Zuala, whose father is involved in the independence movement. Despite the growing political unrest and the activities of the Mizo National Front (MNF) advocating for Mizoram's independence, the protagonist remains largely indifferent, choosing to focus instead on his personal aspirations and daily life.

In March 1966, the stability ends when the Indian Air Force conducts airstrikes over Aizawl to suppress the Mizo National Front insurgency. The violence forces the protagonist and his community into a harrowing journey of survival, confronting the brutal realities of war and its profound impact on civilians, especially children.

== Reception and award ==
In a review for Scroll.in, Veewon Thokchom placed the debut novel within "terror lore", a genre he described as distinctive to Mizo literature, and within the wider body of Mizo Rambuai (troubled-era) writing. He called it one of the few Mizo novels written in English, following Malsawmi Jacob's Zorami: A Redemption Song (2015), that read the protagonist's namelessness as letting him stand in for any civilian caught in the conflict, and also credited the book with recounting a largely suppressed episode of history omitted from Indian school textbooks. Further, academics Lalruatpuii Lianhna and Jyoti Jaya analyse its portrayal of childhood during the Mizoram insurgency through psychoanalytic and narrative approaches to trauma.

In 2023, the book was named to the Parag Honour List, an annual curated selection of notable English and Hindi language children's and young-adult books published by the Parag initiative of Tata Trusts. The book was also shortlisted for the Neev Book Award 2023.
