= Postcard from the Lushai Brigade =

2023 children's historical novel by Hannah Lalhlanpuii

- Author: Hannah Lalhlanpuii
- Language: English
- Series: Songs of Freedom
- Genre: Children's historical fiction
- Set in: Lushai Hills, 1942–1944
- Publisher: Duckbill Books (Penguin Random House India)
- Publication date: 2023
- Pages: 112
- ISBN: 978-0-14-345938-5

Postcard from the Lushai Brigade is a 2023 English-language children's historical novel by the Mizo writer Hannah Lalhlanpuii, published by Duckbill Books, an imprint of Penguin Random House India, as part of the Songs of Freedom series, which explores the lives of children across India during the struggle for independence. It is the author's second novel, following her first work When Blackbirds Fly.

== Plot ==
Set in Aizawl in the Lushai Hills (present-day Mizoram) between 1942 and 1944, the novel follows Bawiha, a young boy who lives with his grandmother, mother and elder brother Kima, and who spends his days immersed in the folk tales told by his grandmother. As the Second World War reaches the region and Japan prepares to invade, the British Indian Army is deployed in the Lushai Hills, and Kima enlists; his departure brings the family's days of simple happiness to an end.

== Reception ==
In 2026, Postcard from the Lushai Brigade was selected for the IBBY Honour List as India's English-language nomination in the writing category. The 2026 IBBY Honour List comprised 191 books in 52 languages from 59 countries, described as the largest selection in the programme's history.

In a review, the children's newspaper RobinAge wrote that the novel uses the training of the Lushai Brigade and the wider colonial takeover of the northeast to question what it means to be free and what fighting a war on behalf of the British costs those who serve. The children's-book review site Kids Book Café praised the author's prose as evocative, noting that it captures the lifestyle, traditions and spiritual beliefs of the Mizo people. Reviewing the Songs of Freedom series for The Hindu, Meneka Raman recommended the series and singled out ''Postcard from the Lushai Brigade'', writing that it brings India's independence struggle to life through children's eyes and drawing attention to the elder brother Kima's decision to volunteer for the Lushai Brigade even as he speaks of Gandhi's philosophy of non-violence
