= Operation Accomplishment =

1967 Indian forced resettlement plan during the Mizo Insurgency

Operation Security also known as Operation Accomplishment (Lushai: Khawkhawm) was a military plan devised by Indian Field Marshal Sam Manekshaw during the Mizo Insurgency in 1967.

Between 1967 and 1969, the rural population of Mizoram, comprising 80% of the district, was forcibly removed from their homes. From a total of 764 villages, 516 were evacuated, and 138 remained ungrouped.

== Background ==
Operation Jericho was launched by the Mizo National Front and led to the Mizo National Front uprising on 28 February 1966. The Indian Home Minister, Gulzarilal Nanda, declared the MNF would be crushed by the military efforts of the state. The emergency legislation crafted for the Naga insurgency was extended to the Mizo district. By March 1966, a degree of order had been established. By the Summer of 1966, the MNF transitioned into archetypal insurgent operations, which the Indian Army described as "attempting to paraylize its [Government's] functions". The Indian Army was forced to engage in counterinsurgency and could only cover limited ground across a difficult, mountainous and heavily forested terrain. The Indian Army originally responded with a different counterinsurgency strategy codenamed "Operation Blanket". In Operation Blanket, the army tried to isolate the guerrillas by deploying 20-man pickets outside every village in Mizoram. The squad pickets were intended to prevent the entry of guerrillas into villages, provide civic assistance, and show the flag. However, due to the territory and sheer number of villages, the programme failed.

Earlier, grouping had been tried in Nagaland during the Naga Insurgency. In the period of 1956–1959, villagers were burnt, and the populations were grouped into camps guarded by the military. However, unlike Nagaland, which lasted 2–3 years, Mizoram faced grouping for almost 15 years. A result of this led to high urbanisation in Mizoram in India as most stayed in grouping centres or moved to Aizawl.

== Planning ==
Following the Mizo National Front uprising and the insurgency that continued, the Indian military and government developed a school of counter-insurgency thought. This happened after the failure of "Operation Blanket". Operation Blanket allowed for a company of security personnel equivalent to the Assam Rifles of the Army to establish two posts of twenty men at villages. The posts were established to be self-contained, fortnightly, and allow for quick responses to threats of the MNF. The failure of Operation Blanket led to a reappraisal of the strategy and proposed for isolation of villages from MNF influence. The Indian Army replicated the plans made by the British Army in Malaya in the Briggs Plan during the Malayan Emergency and the United States regrouping policy in the Strategic Hamlet Program during the Vietnam War. The government recognised that this policy would prevent MNF cadres from relying on villages in terms of food and shelter. A plan was proposed to relocate 60,000 people and to resettle them at new locations. The plan mentioned that "there would be no tinge of force and people will be allowed o join the group voluntarily". The planning commission member Tarlok Singh visited the Mizo district and approved the regrouping plan on the basis that it would be economically viable. Nari Rustomji, Chief Secretary of Assam, supported the scheme, citing that increasing harassment, looting, and killings were occurring and isolation from MNF contact would be safer. He further argued that the families could take whatever belongings they could and the army would help transport all other belongings.

The rebels, who relied on civilians for support such as food, shelter, information and manpower, were to be separated. In October 1966, Lieutenant General (later Field Marshal) Sam Manekshaw, who was the GOC-in-C, Eastern Command in Calcutta, recommended the grouping plan to be able to intern a large, if not complete, population of the Mizo district. He expanded on the scheme to propose grouping to be done on the 10-mile belt of the Vairengte-Aizawl-Lungleh road to make the road secure and ensure logistics. Villagers would be made to work on making new roads, and the new belt constructed could restrict hostile insurgents from making border crossings in East Pakistan. The control of food supplies in villages would make the MNF rebels focus on procuring survival rather than fighting the security forces. Manekshaw further argued that the grouping policy would enable stronger civil oversight of the population with the provision of administrative facilities, including shops, roofing materials, dispensaries, schools and food. The Indian Army lobbied for the scheme as a means of cutting off the MNF's lifeline and securing supply lines.

Army sources credit Lieutenant General Sagat Singh for the planning of the regrouping scheme. Singh decided to group villages along the road between Aizawl and Lungleh. The civil administration opposed the plan on legal and administrative grounds. However, Singh, who was on good terms with Assam Chief Minister B.K. Medhi and Governor B.K. Nehru, allowed for the plan to be implemented. The Government of Assam used the results of a limited regrouping policy in the Naga Hills district to separately propose a grouping plan of 75 centres north of Aizawl, totalling 36,517 people. This civilian regrouping scheme was proposed by the Mizo Hills Deputy Commissioner R. Natarajan. Natarajan believed the army scheme to be too drastic and wished to implement a civilian scheme rather than a military one.

As a result, the Union Cabinet rejected the military scheme on 20 October 1966. However, the Army continued with intense lobbying and launched a public relations exercise with Assa to agree to their scheme. The scheme was approved by the Government of India on 5 December 1966. The Indian press called the scheme "Operation Security" and was described by a civil servant noting the press being supportive of it. The Army codenamed the scheme "Operation Accomplishment".

== Implementation ==
=== Four Stages ===
The grouping was carried out in four stages. The three later stages utilised the Assam Maintenance of Public Order (Amendment) Act, 1968, rather than the Defence of India Rules, as its legal standing was challenged in the Assam High Court. This case was known as Chhuanvawra versus the State of Assam and others. The legal dispute was brought by K. Zahlira, Lenghaia, and Chhuanvawra, challenging the regrouping scheme as a violation of the Fundamental Rights in the Indian Constitution. The Gauhati High Court directed the suspension of all further grouping and asked the Government of Assam to propose any argument for making the order obsolete. On 6 January 1971, the matter was dropped by the High Court after the Assam Government reassured that no further regrouping of villages would be planned.

==== Progressive Protective Villages (PPV) ====
The first stage of grouping was called Protective and Progressive Villages (PPVs). These were built in 10 weeks along the Silchar-Kolasib-Aizawl-Lungleh national highway. A total of 106 villages were grouped together into 18 grouping centres of a total of 52,210 people. In February 1967, the centres were placed under civilian administration while security matters and daily maintenance was placed in the responsibility of Indian security forces. The civilian administration was led by a member of the Assam civil service delegated as an administrative officer or area administrative officer.

The PPV grouping was carried out under the Defence of India Rules 1962 provisions. The PPVs created were: Vairengte, Lungdai, Thingdawl, Kawnpui, Bilkhawthlir, Sihpir, Durtlang, Zemabawk, Tlungvel, Thingsulthliah, Pangzawl, Baktawng, Chhingchhip, Chhiahtlang, Serchhip, Bungtlang, Hnahthial and Zobawk. Kolasib was an administrative centre that provided security protection during this phase. I.A.S. or A.C.S. officers would manage and look after two or more PPVs under an Area's Administrative Officer. Each PPV would be assigned an Administrative Officer of A.C.S rank or equivalent, such as BDO. Administrative officers would also have a sub-administrative officer, typically of the rank of extension officer in Agriculture or a similar position. The administrative officer was also assigned two Gram Sevaks; a Pharmacist, Midwife and Health Assistant; Female Searcher; UDA and LDA clerks; five porters to work under him. Public workers such as teachers, conservation staff and Forest Guard were to report to the administrative officer. A Post Commandant was assigned for all matters related to the security forces.

Each PPV hosted an Administrative Advisory Committee with the administrative officer as chairman. The rest of the members consisted of village council presidents, local political leaders of the Mizo Union and Mizo Congress, Church leaders and individuals selected by the administrative officer. To alleviate the unpopular policy, free rations were provided for a year, one bundle of G.C.I. sheet per family was granted and employment in the Border Road Task Force. Government investments into the PPVs consisted of water supply improvements, schools, new curriculum, road development distribution of livestock and poultry.

==== New Grouping Centre (NGC) ====
The second phase of grouping was called the New Grouping Centre. It was established in August 1969 under the Assam Maintenance of Public Order Act 1953 (AMPOA). It managed five population sectors, mainly the Tripura border, Lungleh-Lawngtlei road, Darngawn-Bungzung North, Vanlaiphai-Serchhip Road and Seling-Champhai Road. It involved 184 villages grouped together into 40 grouping centres with a total population of 97,339. The NGCs included Zobawk. The other 39 NGCs were: Tuipuibari, Phuldungsei, Marpara, Darngawn, Puankhai, Kawnpui, Demagiri, Kalaichari, Borapansuri, Jarulchari, Vaseitlang, Parva, Lokicherra, Rengdil, Lungsei, Kawrtethawveng, Haurruang, Lawngtlai, Thingfal, Ruantlang, Bungzung, Vanzau, Tawipui, Zote, Ruallang, Saitual, Kawlkulh, Khawzawl, Champhai, Chawngtlai, Vaphai, Bungzung, Farkawn, Khawbung, Lungdar, North Vanlaiphai, Cherhlun, Khawlailung, Neihdawn. The administrative arrangements in the NGCs were identical to the PPVs. The grouped families were given around ₹500 to cover the costs of difficult relocations.

==== Voluntary Grouping Centres (VGC) ====
The third phase, Voluntary Grouping Centres, was established in August 1970 under the AMPOA. It was responsible for several villages in different parts of the Mizo Hills and consisted of 26 grouping centres for a total population of 47,156. This was carried out by the 59 Mountain brigade in Manipur. VGCs were not voluntary. Grouping had begun in 1968 before declared finished in August 1970. A rehabilitation grant was given to all families.

==== Extended Loop Areas (ELA) ====
The fourth and final phase was called Extended Loop Areas ordered in 1970 under AMPOA. It planned for 63 villages with a population of 34,219 into 17 grouping centres. This was handled by the 61 Mountain Brigade in pocketed areas such as the Pawi-Lakher region. It was initiated in 1968–69 and finished in 1970. A rehabilitation grant was given to the families.

=== List of centres ===
Village Regroupings
Serial No	Name	Population
Protected and Progressive Village (PPV)
1.	Vairengte	1,988
2.	Bilkhawthlir	2,709
3.	Thingdawl	2705
4.	Kawnpui	3,650
5.	Lungdai	2,048
6.	Sihpir	2,635
7.	Durtlang	2,825
8.	Zemabawk	1,958
9.	Thingsulthliah	3,662
10.	Tlungvel	2,757
11.	Baktawng	3,049
12.	Chhingchhip	3,933
13.	Chhiahtlang	3,269
14.	Serchhip	3,615
15.	Bungtlang	2,499
16.	Pangzawl	2,580
17.	Hnahthial	3,921
18.	Zobawk	2,699
Total PPV Population:		52,519
New Grouping Centres (NGC)
1.	Lokicherra	5,910
2.	Rengdil	4,493
3.	Kawrtethawveng	2,254
4.	Tuipuibari	4,061
5.	Phuldungsei	834
6.	Marpara	1,507
7.	Darngawn (W)	627
8.	Kawnpui (W)	1,515
9.	Puankhai	1,367
10.	Demagiri	5,560
11.	Kalaichari	599
12.	Borapansuri	1,079
13.	Jarulchari	1,090
14.	Vaseitlang	3,572
15.	Parva	1,941
16.	Lungsei (N)	2,579
17.	Jauruang	1,114
18.	Lawngtlai	2,514
19.	Thingfal	1,598
20.	Tawipui	2,481
21.	Ruallang	1,876
22.	Saitual	2,301
23.	Kawlkulh	2,183
24.	Khawzawl	approx. 5,000
25.	Chawngtlai	2,169
26.	Champhai	2,822
27.	Bungzung	3,190
28.	Vanzau	2,671
29.	Vaphai	2,357
30.	Farkawn	2,548
31.	Khawbung	3,067
32.	Lungdar	3,830
33.	North Vanlaiphai	1,915
34.	Khawlailung	1,534
35.	Cherhlun	approx. 2,800
36.	South Vanlaiphai	3,084
37.	Neihdawn	2,078
38.	Zote	2,184
39.	Ruantlang	2,790
Total NGC Population:		97339
Voluntary Grouping Centres (VGC)
1.	Lallen	718
2.	Lengpui	1,126
3.	Hmunpui	774
4.	Bukpui	1,247
5.	Sairang	2,207
6.	Hlimen	1,647
7.	Khawrihnim	964
8.	Reiek	1,488
9.	Rawpuichhip	827
10.	Hortoki	1,995
11.	Bairabi	1,757
12.	Phaileng	1,231
13.	Lungpho	2,726
14.	Khawhai	3,726
15.	Sialhawk	2,289
16.	Chhipphir	1,795
17.	Mualthuam	1,377
18.	Haulawng	2,127
19.	Thingsai	2,201
20.	Thenzawl	3,441
21.	Darlung	1,412
22.	Kanghmun	945
23.	Buarpui	1,461
24.	Sialsuk	2,281
25.	Bunghmun	2,461
26.	Chawngte	3,113
Total VGC Population:		47,156
Extended Loop Areas (ELA)
1.	Darlawn	3,102
2.	Ngopa	1,952
3.	Suangpuilawn	2,322
4.	Kepran	2,136
5.	Ratu	1,498
6.	Hnahlan	2,270
7.	Changzawl	2,815
8.	Khawdungsei	1,425
9.	Vevek	2,098
10.	Zohmun	2,325
11.	Vanbawng	1,603
12.	Khawruhlian	3,058
13.	Phullen	2,051
14.	Mimbung	1,557
15.	Khawlian	1,843
16.	Phuaibuang	1,687
17.	Kawlbem	477
Total ELA Population:		34,219
Other centres
1.	Mamit	2,573
2.	Tuipang	1,365
3.	Sangau	approx. 1,000
Total Misc Population:		4,938
Total Population:		236,162

=== Centre designs ===
The main factors in selecting a site for the regrouping centre were a good water supply, good hygienic condition, sufficient land for agriculture, communication facilities, minimum mobilisation of the people and security. Grouping of villages also considered if historically they were ruled under the same chiefs during the era of Mizo chieftainship. Smaller villages were regrouped into larger ones. Grouping centres were typically surrounded by high bamboo fences, with some towering at 24 feet around the entire village. Some cases had a second layer of spikes 60 feet or more. The fencing process took months, and the men were ordered to do unpaid labour. Army camps were located at the top of the village for surveillance and security purposes.

With the new grouping centres identity cards were established which were required to be shown to the security post. To meet with kin and family from other villages, permission had to be taken from the village commander with a genuine reason. Individuals were only permitted to go to the jungle for the purposes of jhumming and agriculture. If a location did not have any jhums or any inhabitants then the army classified it as a prohibited area. A policy of curfew was also introduced from dawn to dusk. This was to curb nighttime activities and contacts with the MNF while also preventing absenteeism. Patrols would regularly check the houses for all the inhabitants. Food and rations were not permitted to be taken out of the centre to prevent supplies from reaching the MNF. On 12 January 1967, 100 MNF rebels attacked the security post at Tualpung which was east of Aizawl. The security forces suffered casualties from the attack. Villagers coming to Aizawl from the rural countryside reported that the MNF had banned All India Radio broadcasting in the villages.

== Facilitation ==
Under the Defense of India Rules, the specified date and time for all immovable buildings to be burned or rendered useless was before 1 November 1967. At times, villagers were left homeless because the villages had been destroyed before the grouping centres were ready. Such was the case for Lungdai village, which was burnt in 1967, and the villagers waited a whole year within the jungles and fields. However, some villages with houses built from tin and corrugated tin sheets were sometimes permitted to dismantle their house and take some materials to the grouping centre. Despite the Lungdai church standing unburnt, the army would occupy it instead until a church elder known as Romingliana, who was an Assam Rifles soldier, intervened for them to leave. Some villages, such as Rulpui, were bombed as an MNF battalion had formed in the village. The village wasn't ordered to move on this basis, as it was deemed unsafe to move them. In the grouping centres, the original residents would take in families or have them relocated to church or school buildings, or makeshift bamboo shelters. The local residents would also participate in coolie labour to help move the belongings of relocated villagers.

== Social development ==
The civil administration took over the PPVs from the army in 1967 while the army maintained responsibility for security operations. The civil administration posted Administrative officers at various regrouping centres. Their responsibilities includes opening of schools, systemized water supply, and arrangements from agricultural activities. New jobs were made and test relief schemes were introduced with rehabilitation grants offered. The supply issue in the hills were resolved with the help of Air Force which improved the storage of rations. Between 1966–1967, the government spent ₹300,900,561 on agricultural development. The funds saw distribution of seeds, plants and fertilisers, plant protection, minor irrigation, land reclamation and fruit processing. The Community Development Department also began to develop the PPVs. Up to 1969, it distributed pesticides, insecticides and fungicides freely. In the veterinary field, 180 units of improved birds were released. Rural Arts and Crafts centres distributed essential skills in areas such as blacksmithing, carpentry, knitting, sugar cane manufacturing, oil manufacturing, sewing machines and expellers.

The Government invested in the fields of communications, rural health and education. The Public Works Department and Tasks Forces took up road construction. In 1972, mule paths decreased by 432 miles while paved roads increased by 352 miles. Army Engineers opened up the airstrip at Tuirial village near Aizawl. Before it was stopped, Kalinga airlines began a cargo service between Aizawl and Silchar in 1969. Helipads were also constructed on PPVs for officers to visit and inspect grouping centres. The number of posts offices and telegraph offices also increased. The Aizawl telephone exchange was improved and radio telephone was introduced in 1968 to Aizawl between Shillong and Silchar. The government of India also established an All India Radio Station in Aizawl. Schools were also built. All grouping centres consisted of schools with middle English standard. Bigger grouping centres had high schools.

Development of Educational Institutions
Year	Colleges	High Schools	Middle Schools	Elementary Schools
1947	0	2	22	–
1969	2	27	130	310
1972	3	90	190	2426

The formation of grouping centres led to an increase in suspicion of MNF sympathisers. A system devised by the security forces known as Kawktu (lit. 'pointer'). A kawktu was usually a man from the grouped village centre who would help security forces identify MNF personnel or supporters of the MNF. The identities of Kawktu were kept secret via cloth masks. They would supply information and sometimes accompany soldiers while wearing a mask and pointing out a supposed MNF member. Some successful kawktu were taken across villages or in helicopters to aid missions. However since most kawktu feared the security personnel or benefitted from preferential treatment the position became abused. Many kawktu would begin to point at innocent people at random or complete personal vendettas. The victims of the kawktus branded as suspects would be tortured. There were to types of kawktu, former MNF members who surrendered to the security forces and victims of the MNF who lost loved ones to the insurgency. Many Chakmas also joined as kawktus to reap the benefits.

Men would be used as coolies to transport goods and work for the army. However, it would also lead to a risk of facing a clash between the MNF and the army. An incident recounts how the army had captured MNF insurgents and was transporting them with coolies. The MNF made a gunshot to distract the army and free the prisoners, but this was not achieved. Major Nathan, who was angered by the provocation, gave the order to shoot the prisoners and coolies. Most of the prisoners were killed, and 11 of the 17 coolies were killed.

== Impact ==
The grouping scheme was not successful. This was primarily due to the fact that the underground MNF forces retreated to East Pakistan and established their headquarters there. Nunthara argues that the scheme also exposed the villages to misbehaviour of the Indian military personnel which gave a disdain and distrust towards the wider Indian government. The disdain coupled with the food shortages of the grouping centres led to an increase in support for the MNF. Despite reports claiming a decrease in opposition, the antipathy of the grouping scheme did not diminish. The scarcity of land forced many individuals to disperse back to their original village sites after the policy of grouping was relaxed in 1972. Despite the various investments and urban development of the grouping scheme, the help was not adequate to compensate for the difficulties under the scheme. Furthermore, the total amount of compensation and rehabilitation grants amounted to ₹16.6 lakhs for a population of 236,162, which was considered insignificant. The new ungrouped villages post-1972 were known as thlawhbawks and were deprived of village councils, schools and medical facilities. This issue would become a central policy topic during the 1978 elections to recognise the villages. As a Thlawhbawk was a temporary hut on jhum fields, the villagers were legally obligated to attain temporary permits renewed every month to live on their jhums. In 1978, Brig T. Sailo attempted to give recognition to the thlawhbawks but was stopped by the Lieutenant Governor. In 1986 people began to move to Aizawl or back to their original village sites. However most of them especially the younger generation stayed for employment opportunities. After the grouping centres were declared a town anybody could be given a land settlement ceterficate by the village council president. This attracted many wealthy individuals from Aizawl to buy up land in the new towns.

=== Agriculture ===
Under the grouping policy, nearly 80% of the rural population was shifted from their villages and resettled along the highways. The old villages were burnt, and the new settlements were kept under the control of the security forces until 1970. The Indian Army gained greater freedom of action and successfully isolated the insurgents from the people, thereby cutting the insurgents' supply chain. This grouping of villages resulted in a great deal of suffering for the indigenous populace as their farms and houses were burnt, and they could not have enough farmland while being interned in these camps. Animal husbandry was limited, and food rations were kept within the PPVs to prevent sympathisers from providing the MNF with food. A curfew was enforced for seven years, which limited the working distance of Jhum cultivations and errands for economic stimulation. Confiscation of arms also limited the capacity of grouped communities to procure food sources. From 1967 to 1972, farming output went down a cliff and people had to face near-famine conditions. In one year, farming output was 35,000 tonnes for a demand of 75,000 tonnes. The grouping policy also impacted the cultural values of Mizo society in relation to jhumming, such as the obsolescence of Tlawbawk (huts on the jhum land for camping and harvest). Inconsistent policies in the PPV, such as the stopping of the food ration system in 1968, increased prices of basic commodities such as rice and sugar, which further exacerbated starvation among the population. The grouping and urbanisation of villages under the scheme also shortened the jhumming cycle. Most families in the scheme could not cultivate enough paddy to last a whole year as traditional practices did. The civil administrative apparatus of the grouping centres also s aw village councils in dispute over village rivalry who were grouped together. Furthermore, despite rations being provided, the portions were small or not able to be distributed. At Ruantlang grouping centre, the rations provided by the army were unfit for consumption. Diseases would spread in the villages, cause death, and force graves to be dug. In other cases individuals would simply beg for food in a practice known as Pur Phur. Abrupt unplanned evacuations would also see one rice bag issued as blankets not allowed to be cut. Furthermore only one issued per family regardless of member size. Men would also be taken under force labour for projects such as building roads in Kashmir. This would weaken manpower for agriculture and aggravate food shortage.

=== Cultural ===
The regrouped villages led to changes in Mizo cuisine and culinary. The Mizos began to use mustard oil in cooking and began to integrate onions and potatoes more into their dishes. This has been attributed to the ingredients supplied in rations and influence on non-Mizos in contact with them at the PPvs. Daily markets for produce were also established on main roads in villages which sold vegetable, eggs and chickens. The number of shops have also increased. In 1970 the number of shops were 36 out of a total of 65 requests to the Deputy Commissioner to open one. With the improved logistics of PPVs, the shops were also better stocked than traditional vendors before. The impact of the PPV ID system also introduced photography on a large scale to Mizos. The Mizos began to culturally use photography for family photos, gatherings and weddings.

The traditional form of house construction and design had also changed. Mizos now began to build modern designs with even some two storey buildings. Furthermore the kitchen has been separated from the bedroom. While in 1957 the abolishment of chieftainship left some chiefs with relationships with other villagers, the regrouping of villages have completely changed that premise and erased those links. Leadership was now placed in village councillors while social influence was granted to Christian leaders and retired politicians.

Agriculture also changed as an influence of regrouping. The difficulties of jhumming emerged from curfew laws and restrictions on movement. Jhums began to become further away from village while retaining the custom of lot allocation. In 1970 complaints of food shortages arose which the administration denied by claiming that harvests had been good.

The traditional system of Mizo courtship known as Nula rim was also impacted. This was due to the curfew laws and frequent night patrols. Men could not go meet unmarried women to court and gossip. As a result, love songs were composed from 1966 onwards, known as curfew songs. The songs blamed the security forces for the separation of lovers rather than the MNF.

Faith and Christianity also grew throughout the unrest. the number of churches began to decrease but patterns showed an increase in followers and the sizes of church buildings. Pastors traditionally were in charge of 14 churches or so but after regrouping were now responsible for 2–3. This made pastors more influential with their followers and closer to their people as well. In 1968 after a bad weather and harvest the prices of goods and foods were raised. This led to starvation, death and malnutrition. The Synod Standing Committee sanctioned ₹100,000 for distribution to relieve the suffering of the dying people. In 1969 a relief fund from Wales consisting of ₹40,000 was also distributed. The Mizo Sunday School Union also began to train teachers for the schools in the PPVs using courses. Women also began to take on leadership roles in Presbyterian Churches as a result of the Mizo Presbyterian Church Women's Meeting being recognised by the Synod in 1969. Furthermore Mizo burial customs changed as burials were now done outside of villages and headstones now had epitaphs that told of the person's life.

== Human Rights issues ==
The villages were set on fire according to orders. One event submitted to the memorandum of the Human Rights Commission in Mizoram recounts in 1967 how the village of Hnahchang was set on fire and burnt down by the 3rd Bihar Regiment. After the villagers scattered, some went into the jungle and made houses out of tree leaves. Major Bakshi and his soldiers came to the sheds and ordered the people to sit in a line. Everyone in the line was shot dead. A total of nine were killed and four wounded. Among the killed was a three-year-old girl shot in front of her mother and sister. An 80-year-old man and a 67-year-old woman were also victims of this event. The bodies were placed within the sheds and burned down In A Mizo Civil Servant's Random Reflections, an army members confession details the process for the village of Darzo. Orders were given to villagers at 10 am to collect whatever movable property they could before the village would be set on fire by 7 pm. During this time, the personnel carried out orders to burn paddy and other grain storages and stockades, not allowing the MNF to collect food. However, in the case recounted, the officer instead opted to hide the excess paddy and food grain in the caves and to return for it under military escort. At nightfall, orders were given to villagers to burn their homes. Upon non-compliance, they were forced out, and the officers and personnel lit the houses on fire instead. Upon the village being burned, the villagers were marched out with soldiers leading in front and trailing behind them. The Darzo villagers were assigned Hnathial as their grouping centre which was a 15 mile walk with very few rests and stops. However upon reaching the centre a document had to be signed. The document would detail that the village had voluntarily asked to be resettled into the Hnahthial PPV under security forces protection from the insurgents in return for new facilities. Another document detailed that the villagers burned down their own village and that no force or coersion was used by the security forces. On refusal to sign both documents the officers used revolvers and stationed soldiers at gunpoint to comply. In other cases, such as Kelzam in 1968, a village which no longer exists, the villagers were instructed to walk without escort as the personnel gave orders and left. However, the MNF patrols forced the villagers to return. To avoid the risk of a shootout, the villagers instead left for Aizawl before being detained in Sihphir for three months and Durtlang. In 1972, in Aizawl, the villagers were given land passes or ownership papers.

Due to traditional Mizo customs of women fetching water for the army camps, this led to abuse and rape. In some camp,s the rapes became so egregious that men had to be supplemented for the fetching of water instead. Coolies and forced labour oversaw men required to carry equipment and military supplies for several days and forego domestic duties and agriculture. The army also believed that the MNF would not attack patrols with Mizo coolies. In January 1967, coolies from Kelkang and Buang were taken alongside 14 MNF prisoners to Champhai. The MNF skirmishes with the patrol before retreating. As a result, Captain Grewal Singh took his revenge on the prisoner and coolies instead, leading to the deaths of 18 men. The coolies were made to kneel as they were shot at point-blank range. As he was reloading, the remaining survivors escaped into the jungles.

According to MNF secretary S. Lianzuala, in the grouping phase for Operation Accomplishment, the Indian Army burnt down 21 villages, gutted 2,133 houses, and raped 54 women (with three dying in the process of the assault). A total of 17 churches were burnt down, while others were occupied, with access to worship restricted as the army used them as local headquarters. Several accounts also record the desecration of religious buildings and materials, such as the destruction of the Bible and Hymn books.

== Sources ==
=== Books ===
- Goswami, B.B (1979). The Mizo Unrest: A Study of Politicisation of Culture (PDF). Jaipur: Aalekh Publishers.
- Hluna, Dr. J.V; Tochhawng, Rini (2012). The Mizo Uprising: Assam Assembly Debates on the Mizo Movement, 1966–1971. Newcastle, UK: Cambridge Scholars Publishing. ISBN 978-1-44384042-2.
- Lalkhama (2006). A Mizo Civil Servant's Random Reflections. Ghaziabad: Express print House.
- Nag, Sajal (2016). "Disciplining Villages and Restoring Peace in the Countryside". In Samaddar, Ranabir (ed.). Government of Peace: Social Governance, Security and the Problematic of Peace. Delhi: Taylor and Francis. pp. 57–78. ISBN 978-1-317-12538-9.
- Nunthara, C (1996). Mizoram: Society and Polity. New Delhi: Indus Publishing Company. p. 42. ISBN 81-7387-059-4.
- Rajagopalan, Rajesh (2020). Fighting Like a Guerrilla: The Indian Army and Counterinsurgency. New Delhi: Taylor & Francis. ISBN 0-415-45684-5.
- Sinh, Ramdhir (2013). A Talent for War: The Military Biography of Lt Gen Sagat Singh. Delhi: Vij Books India. ISBN 978-93-82652-23-6.

=== Conference ===
- Nag, Sajal (2011). A Gigantic Panopticon: Counter Insurgency Operation and Modes of Discipline and Punishment in North East India (PDF). Development, Logistics, And, Governance: Fourth Critical Studies conference. Kokatta.

=== Journals ===
- Holt, Benjamin (2025). "An 'Elephant Trying to Chase a Rat': Indian COIN in the Mizo Hills, 1967–1970". War in History. 32 (4): 406–425. doi:10.1177/09683445241296844.
- Rangasami, Amritha (15 April 1978). "Mizoram: Tragedy of Our Own Making". Economic and Political Weekly. 13 (15): 653–662. JSTOR 4366529.
- Sundar, Nandini (2011). "Interning Insurgent Populations: the buried histories of Indian Democracy". Economic and Political Weekly. 46 (6): 47–57. JSTOR 27918119.
