= Hannah Lalhlanpuii =

Mizo writer

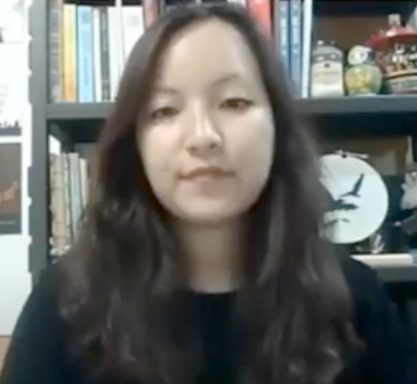
- In a 2022 video
- Born: Aizawl, Mizoram, India
- Occupations: Writer, assistant professor
- Notable work: When Blackbirds Fly

Hannah Lalhlanpuii is a Mizo author and academic from Aizawl, Mizoram, India, whose writing highlights Mizo history and culture. Her work encompasses themes such as postcolonial studies, and children's literature.

== Early life and education ==
Lalhlanpuii pursued her Bachelor of Arts in English at St. Edmund's College, Shillong, Meghalaya, followed by a Master of Arts in English from North-Eastern Hill University, Meghalaya. She earned her Master of Philosophy from the University of Hyderabad, Telangana, and completed her Doctor of Philosophy at Mizoram University. Her academic focus includes postcolonial studies, trauma writing, and children's literature.

== Career ==
In August 2022, Lalhlanpuii joined the Department of English at Mizoram Christian College as an assistant professor. Her academic interests lie in postcolonial studies, trauma writing, and children's literature.

Lalhlanpuii's debut novel When Blackbirds Fly drew critical attention for portraying the Mizo insurgency through a child's eyes. Reviewing it for Scroll.in, Veewon Thokchom placed the book within "terror lore", a genre he associated with Mizo writing about the disturbed years, and called it one of the few Mizo novels written in English, following Malsawmi Jacob's Zorami (2015). Writing in The Indian Express, Tora Agarwala described the novel as recounting the Mizo independence movement through the life of a young boy caught in its turmoil.

== Awards and recognition ==
Her book, When Blackbirds Fly was included in the 2023 Parag Honour List, which is an annual selection of notable children's and young-adult books published by the Parag initiative of Tata Trusts. The novel was also shortlisted for the Neev Book Award 2023 in the young-adult category.

Further in 2026, Lalhlanpuii's Songs of Freedom: Postcard from the Lushai Brigade was selected for the IBBY Honour List as India's English-language nomination in the writing category. Her short story "A Bird Called Freedom" also appeared in the anthology Big Mistakes: An Anthology of Growing Up and Other Tough Stuffs (2021), and two of her poems were included in Lockdown Literature from Mizoram (2021).
