= Bombing of Aizawl =

Aerial bombing attacks in 1966

- Part of the Mizo National Front uprising
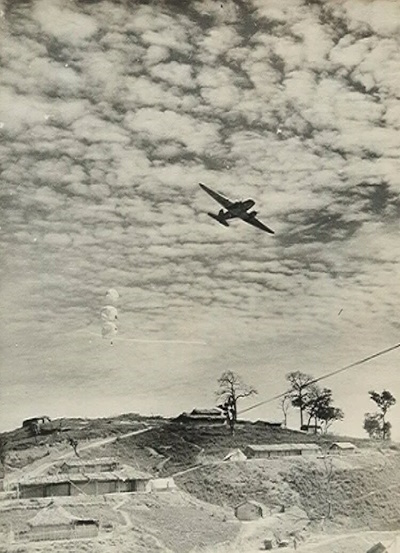
- Planes above Aizawl
Date	4 March 1966 - 8 March 1966
Location	Aizawl, Mizo district

Belligerents
Republic of India	Mizo National Front

Commanders and leaders
(India) Marshal of the Indian Air Force Arjan Singh (India) Air Vice Marshal Yeshwant Vinayak Malse	Unknown

The bombing of Aizawl was an Indian State aerial bombing attack on the city of Aizawl, the capital of the Mizo district (now Mizoram) and surrounding areas, during the Mizo National Front uprising. The Indian Government deployed jet fighters from the Toofani Squadron and Hunter Squadron. The aircraft identified in the operation were French Dassault Ouragun.

The bombing of Aizawl remains the only time in the history of independent India that the air force was used by the Government of India, to bomb its own citizens, within its own territory.

== Background ==
After Operation Jericho, the Mizo National Front took over several areas of the Mizo district and occupied Aizawl. They sieged the Assam Rifles Headquarters and demanded surrender. The Indian Army made attempts to fly in reinforcements from Kumbhirgram in Silchar however strong fire of the MNF rebels deterred any safe landings. General Sam Manekshaw flew in a Caribou aircraft for reconnaissance. However, the aircraft returned due to bullet holes and nearly wounding Manekshaw. As a result the government authorised the Indian Air Force to accompany the helicopters as escorts to ease the pressure of besieged Indian forces.

== The attacks ==
Four Toofanis and Hunters were seen flying over Aizawl at 10am on 5 March 1966. The planes completed preliminary surveillance before the first shots were fired at Tuikhuahtlang. Tuikhuahtlang was an area housing a water reservoir which the MNF forces had captured. Another argument is that Laldenga's house and the Boy's English Middle School which was used to feed MNF volunteers were also grouped close by. The aircraft opened fire destroying the circuit house and inflaming the Armed Police Headquarters at Armed Veng. Other areas set aflame were Khatla, Republic Veng, Chhinga Veng and Dawrpui's main makert area. The fighters used machine gun rounds of 16mm and 20mm and rocket propelled bombs of 60mm. The jet fighters flew in pairs, firing 20mm, 30mm and 40mm calibre machine guns and dropping incendiary bombs. The MNF rebels moved out of Aizawl and while travelling to Hlimen stopped at Kulikawn. A MNF member, J. Lalsangzuala had picked up empty cartridges which was examined and the calibre measures were taken by the MNF. On 6 March, the planes returned firing at several areas. Helicopeters also landed with reinforcements.

General D.K. Palit stated in his book, that the IAF fighters carried out an air strike at 1130 hours and strafed hostile positions. This was repeated in the afternoon. Palit claimed success for melting away the hostiles from occupying Aizawl.

According to Hminga, the foreign secretary of Mizoram sawkar, up to 195 bombs were dropped on Aizawl alone. Residents and inhabitants of Aizawl evacuated for their safety towards Reiek and Sialsuk mountains for shelter from the bombing and strafing. According to J.V Hluna, 13 people were killed as a direct result of the bombing.

With the arrival of the Indian Army in Aizawl on 7 March, MNF decided to retreat to Lunglei, which was under the MNF control. The security forces threatened to bomb Lunglei, but two Christian clergymen – H. S. Luaia and Pastor C.L. Hminga – requested them to avoid it in order to prevent loss of civilian lives and took responsibility to secure the surrender of the MNF rebels.

After Aizawl was burning, the MNF rebels withdrew to Khawchhete, a village south of South Hlimen. They took Bawichhuaka the counsellor of the Mizo Union with them. Laldenga and his party waited on the outskirts of Demagiri to cross into East Pakistan as the Indian Army cleared Demagiri.

=== Further bombings ===
On 7 March, the IAF targeted sites away from Aizawl, such as Hnahlan near Champhai. At 2pm, two jet fighters flew over Hnahlan and strafed and bombed the village. Approximately 200 of the 270 houses were completely destroyed with three people dead. The food stock and animals were collaterally burnt to ashes. Pukpui and Bunhmun were also attacked by jet fighters in the same month. Pukpui was known as the home village of Laldenga, leader of the MNF. The villagers were herded out and watched as the pilots fired upon the houses in front of them. In Bunghmun the army was attacked by the MNF. As a result, two jet fighters flew a couple rounds above it. On the second round it strafed with machine gun fire and the third round saw the dropping of bombs. The village was burnt down from the bombs and finished off by army personnel.

In September 1966, two jet fighters flew over South Mualthuam as villagers worked in the firleds. They flew south towards Tuipui and opened machine gun fire on the village. A few months later in January 1967, the IAF aided the Indian Army by firing rounds at Hmuntlang. The villagers evacuated and recorded that on return the animals were found dead and large bomb craters were found.

== Impact ==
Significant financial damage further damaged the economy of Aizawl. Wealthy businessmen fled Aizawl on the day of the bombings. Due to the lack of bank vaults, cash and monetary savings were stored at home which would be destroyed in the bombing campaign. Logistical resources such as petrol stored in barrels burnt down as collateral from various house fires caused by the incendiary bombs.

The bombings also impacted local Mizo culture and history. As the inhabitants of Aizawl evacuated, they left behind cultural possessions which were destroyed. As a result the Mizoram State Museum was required to import artefacts and replicas from Myanmar. The bombing set back the progress for Mizo archaeologists and archivists who lost access to historical records and documentation.

Due to the evacuation of the residents of Aizawl, the Indian forces began to occupy Aizawl in the time being. After the bombings when the residents returned a lot of the houses had been thoroughly looted or completely destroyed by the security forces personnel. On March 9, 1966, all the men were assembled in the Bara Bazar to clean up the town. A number of corpses were found and buried into graves dug nearby.

== Political responses ==
=== Northeast delegates ===
The decision to airstrike Aizawl was brought to the assembly by Stanley Nichols-Roy on 5 April 1966. He had returned from the Mizo Hills with Hoover Hynniewta and Professor G.G. Swell, where they presented their opinion that, based on the evidence gathered on their visit, the decision was more excessive than the appropriate amount needed. The government in Assam and Delhi both denied the use of the air force to counter the uprising. Indira Gandhi, in a statement to the Hindustan Standard on 9 March, was prompted on the use of the air force, which she stated was only used to deploy men and drop supplies. Stanley Nichols Roy and Hoover Hynniewta condemned the excessive use of force and the denial of the Indian government's orders for it to be carried out. Eye witness accounts and material evidence from their visit were presented, and they became the first members to strongly oppose the decision.

The question of the bombing of Aizawl is still debated even among the Mizo people. According to Wing Commander Lalzawma who served as a Commissioned Officer at Tezpur, the fighters had used 60MMRP (Rocket Propelled) now obsolete and machine guns of 20MM and 16MM calibre when bombs used by such fighters were 250, 500 or 1000 pounds in variety. His statement orates that 6 fighters from the 29 Toofani squadron were sent to Kumbigram from Tezpur and Hunter aircraft from the 17 Hunter squadron in Jorhat had been deployed for missions in the Mizo district. Shell and casings found at sites in Aizawl bear testimony and there is no argument on the identification of highly explosive weapons used by the fighters in their mission. The debate terms the weapons as bombs as they were purposed to detonate or explode on impact. Hoover Hynniewta presented fragments of the bombs from their visit to Aizawl. Hynniewta and Nichols Roy had witnessed a bomb explosion. They took photographs of a bomb which didn't explode. It was touched and photographed with fragments collected. Testimonies of over 100 people were collected which recorded the loud explosions heard in the hills when the planes flew over and fire breaking out in the houses. Rockets were also used. The fragments presented were bullets and broken piece of iron sheet.

=== Indian government ===
==== Denial ====
Prime Minister Indira Gandhi denied the use of the IAF in the bombing of Aizawl. In a statement to the Hindustan Standard on 9 March 1966, Gandhi responded to the claim by denying it. She elaborated by stating that the use of the IAF was to drop men and supplies.

The Government of Assam denied the aerial bombing of Aizawl. This was due to the lack of evidence from independent agencies. However, sources from the Indian Army stated that due to the inability to deploy supplies via helicopters being shot at, the IAF called for air strikes by jet fighters on 5 March. Chief Minister Bimala Prasad Chaliha stated via a report that the MNF's intention to burn down the Assam Rifles Headquarters led to the burning of Aizawl. The MNF who set fire to the market area hoped the winds would carry the fire to the Assam Rifles allegedly backfired.

Indian historians eventually admitted the aerial bombing of Aizawl had occurred. Matthew Thomas, a commanding officer in the operations, recalled that the IAF was utilised to scatter the hostile positions around the battalion area. It succeeded in scattering the hostiles, but at the cost of Aizawl catching on fire. From 9–13 March, the IAF also bombed Demagiri to relieve the garrison there according to Thomas.

==== Justification ====
The Indian narrative argues the airstrikes were effective in curbing the hostiles and their insurgency. However the fighters targets were not restricted to hostile hideouts. A majority of the population of Aizawl had retreated into neighbouring villages and forest hideouts. Many civilians were rendered homeless as the bombs and rockets burned down properties or damaged them beyond repair. The bombing of Aizawl was also not protected under the Armed Forces Special Powers Act (AFSPA). AFSPA empowered armed forces consisting of the army and air force operating as land forces. A debate in the Lok Sabha was commented on by Naushir Bharucha stating that it probably meant "the government very mercifully has not permitted the air forces to shoot or strafe the area... or to bomb". The minister of home affairs did not confirm this interpretation. Several academics have outlined that the airstrikes aggravated the support for the MNF insurgency and created contempt in the local population for the Indian government.

== Legacy ==
Every year on 5 March, the day is recognised as Zoram Ni in remembrance of the bombing of Aizawl and other sites in Mizoram.

In 2010, there was a public outcry in Mizoram for the Indian Government, which had ordered the strafing of Mizoram in 1966 and 1967, to issue a formal apology to the people of Mizoram, for the disproportionate use of force and bombing of Aizawl.

== See also ==
- Mizo National Front uprising

== Sources ==
- Explore Mizoram (4 March 2019). "Zawlkhawpuiin senmei a chan ni kha!" [The day Aizawl burned down]. Explore Mizoram (in Mizo). Aizawl.
- Hluna, Dr. J.V; Tochhawng, Rini (2012). The Mizo Uprising: Assam Assembly Debates on the Mizo Movement, 1966-1971. Newcastle, UK: Cambridge Scholars Publishing. ISBN 978-1-44384042-2.
- Hminga (1 April 1966). "The Mizo people". The Times. No. 56595. Aizawl: Gale Primary Sources.
- Chima, Jugdep; Saikia, Pahi (2023). Insurgency in India's Northeast: Identity Formation, Postcolonial Nation.State building, and Secessionist Resistance. New York: Taylor and Francis. ISBN 978-1-003-38896-8.
- &Khojol, Henry L. (2 March 2022). "The day Mizoram declared independence from India, 56 years ago". EastMojo.
- Nag, Sajal (2011). A Gigantic Panopticon: Counter Insurgency Operation and Modes of Discipline and Punishment in North East India (PDF). Development, Logistics, And, Governance: Fourth Critical Studies conference. Kokatta.
- Nibedon, Nirmal (2013). Mizoram: The Dagger Brigade. Atlanta, Georgia: Lancer Publishers. ISBN 978-1-935501-82-4.
- Palit, D.K. (1984). Sentinels of the Northeast: The Assam Rifles. India: Palit & Palit.
- Roluahpuia (2023). Nationalism in the Vernacular. Cambridge: Cambridge University Press. doi:10.1017/9781009346061. ISBN 9781009346061.
- Chakraborty, Anup Shekhar (2010). "Memory of a Lost Past, Memory of Rape: Notalgia, Trauma and the Construction of Collective Social Memory Among the Zo Hnahthlak". Identity, Culture and Politics. 11 (2): 87–104.
- Zamawia, R. (2012). Zofate Zinkawngah: zalènna mei a mit tùr a ni lo [Mizo Journey: The fire of freedom is not to be extinguished] (in Mizo). India: R. Zamawia.
