= Tlabung =

- Location within Mizoram Location within India
- Coordinates: 22.9120100°N 92.4979900°E
- Country: India
- State: Mizoram
- District: Lunglei
- Founder: Lt. Col. Th. Lewin
- Named for: A falls and rocky cliffs at Vantaikhawr

Government
  - Type: Under a Sub-Divisional Officer
  - Body: Village Panchayat

Population (2011)
  - Total: 3,675

Languages
  - Official: Mizo
  - Local: Mizo and Chakma
- Time zone: UTC+5:30 (IST)
- Postal code: 796751
- Vehicle registration: MZ-02
- Climate: Am
- Website: mizoram.nic.in

Tlabung is a census town in Lunglei district in the Indian state of Mizoram.

== History ==
The township was first established and settled in November 1871 when the Superintendent of the Chittagong Hill Tracts, Lt. Col. T.H. Lewin, ordered his assistant, Mr. Crouch and 150 soldiers from the Frontier Battalion to build a fort at Tlabung to serve as the battalion headquarters of the Southern Column of the Lushai Expedition to rescue a young girl named Mary Winchester from the Lushai Chief Bengkhuaia. On 1 April 1898, it became a part of the South Lushai Hills, having previously belonged to the Chittagong Hill Tracts. It became a flourishing trade center during 1860-70 when Mizo in the north and south had less knowledge of commerce. It was used as the main river port to import goods from what is now Bangladesh through Chittagong city. It had an old fort constructed during British times at the advice of Lt. Col. T.H. Lewin. The British troops and missionaries used this route to reach Mizoram during the colonial days. It used to take 5 days to reach Tlabung from Chittagong, a distance of about 90 kilometers, after which they would travel another 35 kilometers to reach Lunglei.

Karnaphuli River links Mizoram with the port cit of Chittagong on the shores of Bay of Bengal. British Troops and missionaries used this route to reach Mizoram during the Colonial days. It used to take 5 days to reach from Chittagong to Tlabung, a distance of about 90 kilometers after which they would travel another 35 kilometers to reach Lunglei.

By 1871-1872 there were already 8 shops in Tlabung. Big bazaars were started by Superintendent LL Peters from 25 April 1940.

== Demographics ==
As of the 2011 Census of India, Tlabung had a population of 4,554 spread over 976 households. Males constitute 49.8% of the population and females 51.2%. Tlabung has an average literacy rate of 92.5%. In Tlabung, 14.6% of the population is under 6 years of age.

== Transport ==
Tlabung is 97 kilometers from Lunglei, the district headquarters and 332 kilometers from Aizawl, the state capital. The Khawthlangtuipui River also known as Borgang flows through Tlabung, and from the "Missionary Kai Ferry Terminal" at Tlabung the river is navigable up to Rangamati in Bangladesh but due to construction of downstream Kaptai Dam at Kaptai in Bangladesh, access to Port of Chittagong is not possible by boat but accessible by road.

Kawrpuichhuah / Kawarpuchiah / Kawripuichhuah India–Myanmar Integrated border checkpost near Tlabung in Lunglei district opened in Oct 2017. The 22 km long Lunglei–Tlabung–Kawrpuichhuah road was upgraded in 2014-15 in a World Bank-funded project to enhance India-Bangladesh border connectivity.

== Economy ==
A border trade facilitation center in Tlabung is in operation which helps with trade between Chittagong, Bangladesh and Tlabung, Mizoram. There are future plans to open the route from Tlabung to Chittagong port, it has been estimated that Mizoram can export raw and semi raw materials like bamboo while it can import iron, steel and crockeries.
