= Chawngtlai =

- village
- Location in Mizoram, India Chawngtlai (India)
- Coordinates: 23.4484951°N 93.2087271°E
- Country: India
- State: Mizoram
- District: Champhai
- Block: Khawzawl
- Elevation: 1,398 m (4,587 ft)

Population (2011)
  - Total: 1,638
- Time zone: UTC+5:30 (IST)
- 2011 census code: 271322

Chawngtlai is a village in the Champhai district of Mizoram, India. It is located in the Khawzawl R.D. Block.

== Demographics ==
According to the 2011 census of India, Chawngtlai has 325 households. The effective literacy rate (i.e. the literacy rate of population excluding children aged 6 and below) is 93.44%.

Demographics (2011 Census)
	Total	Male	Female
Population	1638	847	791
Children aged below 6 years	250	123	127
Scheduled caste	0	0	0
Scheduled tribe	1629	843	786
Literates	1297	678	619
Workers (all)	967	507	460
Main workers (total)	950	500	450
Main workers: Cultivators	908	473	435
Main workers: Agricultural labourers	2	1	1
Main workers: Household industry workers	1	0	1
Main workers: Other	39	26	13
Marginal workers (total)	17	7	10
Marginal workers: Cultivators	6	3	3
Marginal workers: Agricultural labourers	3	1	2
Marginal workers: Household industry workers	0	0	0
Marginal workers: Others	8	3	5
Non-workers	671	340	331
